= Aq Bolagh =

Aq Bolagh or Aqbolagh or Agh Bolagh or Aghbolagh or Aq Bulagh or Aqbulaq or Aqbolaq (Persian: اقبلاغ or اغبلاغ) may refer to:

== Ardabil Province ==
- Agh Bolagh, Ardabil
- Aghbolagh, Ardabil, a village in Khalkhal County
- Aq Bulagh, Ardabil, a village in Khalkhal County
- Aq Bolagh, Ardabil, a village in Meshgin Shahr County
- Aq Bolagh-e Aqajan Khan, a village in Ardabil County
- Aq Bolagh-e Rostam Khan, a village in Ardabil County
- Agh Bolagh-e Olya, a village in Meshgin Shahr County
- Agh Bolagh-e Sofla, a village in Meshgin Shahr County
- Agh Bolagh-e Mostafa Khan, a village in Namin County

== Chaharmahal and Bakhtiari Province ==
- Aqbolagh, Borujen, a village in Borujen County
- Aqbolagh, Shahrekord, a village in Shahrekord County

== East Azerbaijan Province ==
- Aqbolagh, East Azerbaijan, a village in Ahar County
- Aghbolagh, Bostanabad, a village in Bostanabad County
- Aghbolagh, Charuymaq, a village in Charuymaq County
- Agh Bolagh, Hashtrud, a village in Hashtrud County
- Aghbolagh, Hashtrud, a village in Hashtrud County
- Aghbolagh-e Hasan Kandi, a village in Hashtrud County
- Aghbolagh-e Hashtrud, a village in Hashtrud County
- Agh Bolagh, Jolfa, a village in Jolfa County
- Aghbolagh-e Alamdar, a village in Maragheh County
- Aghbolagh-e Fotuhi, a village in Maragheh County
- Aghbolagh-e Olya, East Azerbaijan, a village in Maragheh County
- Aghbolagh-e Sofla, Maragheh, a village in Maragheh County
- Aqbolagh-e Bahman, a village in Sarab County
- Aghbolagh, Varzaqan, a village in Varzaqan County
- Aghbolagh-e Sofla, Varzaqan, a village in Varzaqan County

== Hamadan Province ==
- Aq Bolagh, Hamadan, a village in Asadabad County
- Aq Bolagh-e Latgah, a village in Bahar County
- Aq Bolagh-e Aqdaq, a village in Kabudarahang County
- Aq Bolagh-e Morshed, a village in Kabudarahang County

== Kermanshah Province ==
- Aqbolagh, Kermanshah, a village in Sonqor County

== Kurdistan Province ==
- Aghbolagh-e Ali Akbar Khan, a village in Bijar County
- Aghbolagh-e Hoseyn Khan, a village in Bijar County
- Aghbolagh-e Taghamin, a village in Bijar County
- Aq Bolagh-e Chang Almas, a village in Bijar County
- Aq Bolagh, Dehgolan, a village in Dehgolan County
- Aq Bolagh, Kowleh, a village in Divandarreh County
- Aq Bolagh, Saral, a village in Divandarreh County
- Aq Bolagh, Qorveh, a village in Qorveh County

== Lorestan Province ==
- Aqbolagh, Lorestan, a village in Azna County
- Aq Bolagh-e Mohammad Vali, a village in Azna County

== Markazi Province ==
- Aqbolagh-e Sadat, a village in Shazand County
- Aq Bolaq-e Mohammad Hoseyn Khan, a village in Shazand County

== Qazvin Province ==
- Aq Bolagh, Qazvin, a village in Takestan County

== West Azerbaijan Province ==
- Aghbolagh-e Mokhur
- Aghbolagh-e Suqqar
- Aghbolagh-e Kalisa Kandi, a village in Chaldoran County
- Aq Bolagh-e Meydan, a village in Chaldoran County
- Aghbolagh, Khoy, a village in Khoy County
- Aq Bolagh-e Olya, West Azerbaijan, a village in Khoy County
- Aq Bolagh-e Sofla, a village in Khoy County
- Aghbolagh-e Chamanlu, a village in Maku County
- Agh Bolagh, Miandoab, a village in Miandoab County
- Agh Bolagh, Oshnavieh, a village in Oshnavieh County
- Aghbolagh-e Mokhur, a village in Showt County
- Aghbolagh-e Hamadani, a village in Takab County
- Aghbolagh-e Olya, West Azerbaijan, a village in Takab County
- Aghbolagh, Urmia, a village in Urmia County
- Aq Bolagh, Sumay-ye Beradust, a village in Urmia County

== Zanjan Province ==
- Aq Bolagh, Zanjan, a village in Ijrud County
- Aq Bolagh-e Olya, Zanjan, a village in Khodabandeh County
- Aqbolagh-e Sofla, a village in Khodabandeh County
- Aqbolagh, Mahneshan, a village in Mahneshan County
- Aqbolagh-e Hasanabad, a village in Mahneshan County
- Aqbolagh-e Humeh, a village in Zanjan County
- Aq Bolagh Rural District, in Zanjan Province

== See also ==
- Ak-Bulak (disambiguation)
- Ağbulaq (disambiguation)
- Akbulak (disambiguation)
- Aq Bulaq (disambiguation)
