= Ağbulaq =

Ağbulaq or Aghbulag or Agbulak or Agbulakh or Agbulag or Aghboulagh or Aghbulagh may refer to:

In Armenia:

- Aghberk, a village in the Gegharkunik Province
- Aghbullagh, an abandoned village in the Goris Municipality, Syunik Province
- Lusaghbyur, Lori, a town in the Lori Province

In Azerbaijan:

- Ağbulaq, Ismailli, a village and municipality in the Ismailli Rayon
- Ağbulaq, Jalilabad, a village in the Jalilabad Rayon
- Ağbulaq, Kalbajar, a village in the Kalbajar Rayon
- Ağbulaq, Khojali, a village in the Khojali Rayon
- Ağbulaq, Khojavend, a village in the Khojavend Rayon, and in the Hadrut Province of the Republic of Artsakh
- Ağbulaq (Mysmana), Khojavend, a village in the Khojavend Rayon, and in the Martuni Province of the Republic of Artsakh
- Ağbulaq, Lachin, a Kurdish village in the Lachin Rayon
- Ağbulaq, Nakhchivan, a village and municipality in the Shahbuz Rayon of Nakhchivan
- Ağbulaq, Shusha, a village in the Shusha Rayon
- Ağbulaq, Tovuz, a village and municipality in the Tovuz Rayon

== See also ==
- Akbulak (disambiguation)
- Ak-Bulak (disambiguation)
- Aq Bolagh (disambiguation)
- Aq Bulaq (disambiguation)
