= Ağbulaq, Azerbaijan =

Ağbulaq, Azerbaijan may refer to:

- Ağbulaq, Ismailli
- Ağbulaq, Jalilabad
- Ağbulaq, Khojali
- Ağbulaq, Khojavend
- Ağbulaq, Lachin
- Ağbulaq, Nakhchivan
- Ağbulaq, Tovuz
