= Albolagh =

Albolagh or Al Bolagh (Persian: البلاغ), also rendered as Al Bulaq, may refer to:

- Albolagh, Kurdistan
- Al Bolagh, Kurdistan
- Albolagh, Razavi Khorasan
- Albolagh, Bukan, West Azerbaijan Province
- Albolagh, Mahabad, West Azerbaijan Province
