= Aq Bulaq =

Aq Bulaq (Persian: اق بولاق) may refer to:

- Aghcheh Bolagh
- Aq Bulaq, Kurdistan
- Aq Bolaq-e Mohammad Hoseyn Khan
- Aq Bulaq Murshid
- Aq Bolagh-e Aqdaq
- Aqbolagh-e Sofla
- Aghbolagh-e Olya, West Azerbaijan

== See also ==
- Ak-Bulak (disambiguation)
- Ağbulaq (disambiguation)
- Akbulak (disambiguation)
- Aq Bolagh (disambiguation)
