= Shurnukh =

Shurnukh Շուռնուխ
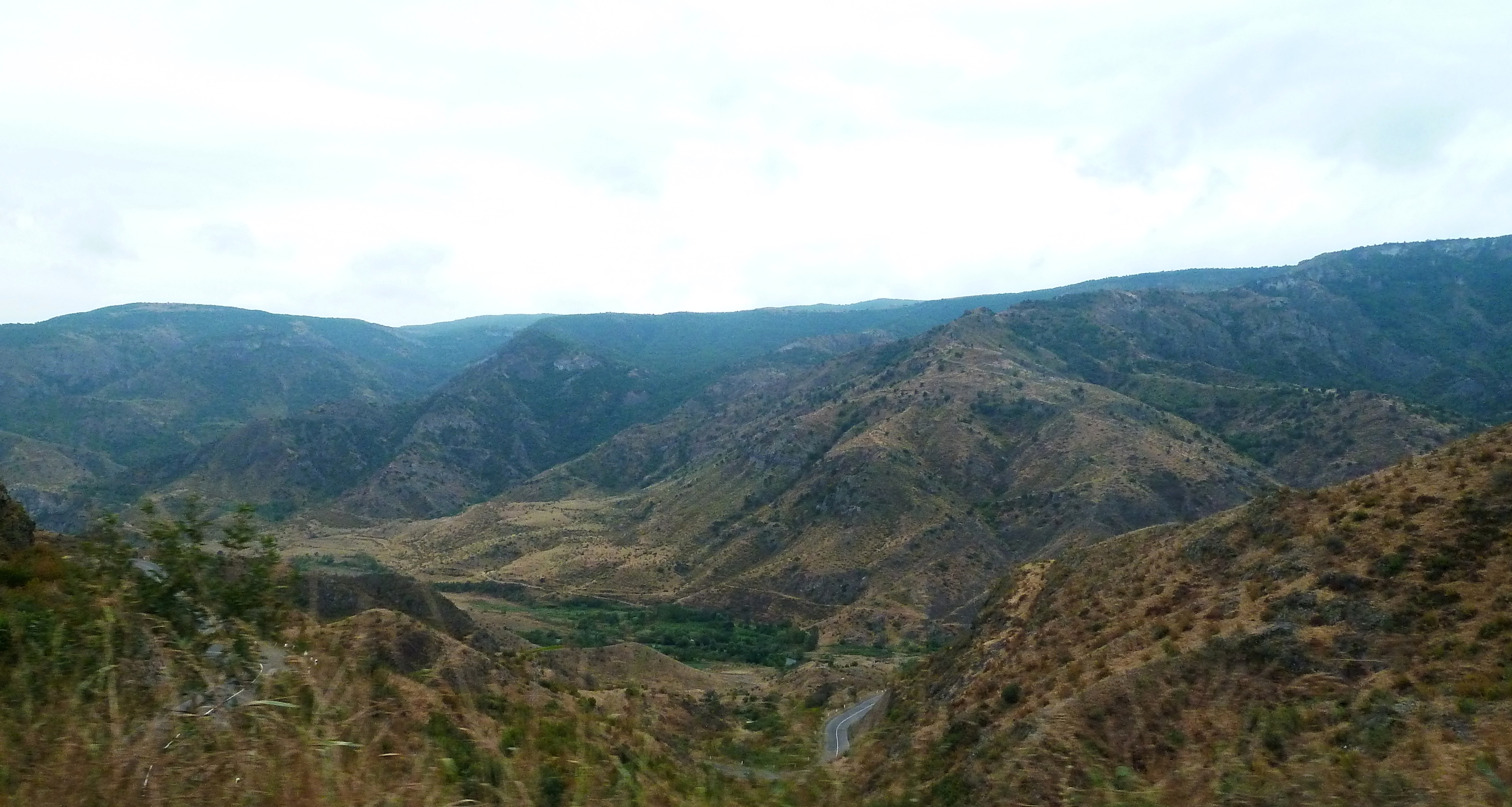
- Mountains around Shurnukh

- Location within Armenia Location within Syunik Province
- Coordinates: 39°22′39″N 46°23′29″E
- Country: Armenia
- Province: Syunik
- Municipality: Goris

Area
  - Total: 8.83 km^{2} (3.41 sq mi)

Population (2016)
  - Total: 153
  - Density: 17.3/km^{2} (44.9/sq mi)
- Time zone: UTC+4 (AMT)

Shurnukh (Armenian: Շուռնուխ) is a village in the Goris Municipality of the Syunik Province in Armenia.

The village is located on the Armenia-Azerbaijan border. Following the end of the 2020 Nagorno-Karabakh war and the withdrawal of Armenian forces from the adjacent Qubadli District of Azerbaijan, a small part of the village, including 12 houses, was determined to be part of the Qubadli District and fell under the control of Azerbaijan.

== History ==
Shurnukh is first mentioned in Stephen Orbelian's 13th-century work History of the Province of Sisakan as Shornokho (Armenian: Շոռնոխոյ), located in the Baghk (or Kashunik) canton of the Syunik province of historic Greater Armenia. According to one theory, the name of the village comes from Old Armenian and originally had the meaning of "running water, a place of running water, a damp area." The date of the destruction of the historic village is unknown; however, it is known that there were ruins at its site at the end of the 19th century, including remnants of a church.

Shurnukh and the surrounding area was the sight of fighting during the Armenian–Azerbaijani conflict of 1918–1920. The area was strategically important due to its proximity to the road connecting the towns of Goris and Kapan (then called Ghapan). In January 1920, forces under the command of Garegin Nzhdeh attacked and captured Shurnukh and several nearby villages and heights.

The modern village was founded in 1930 on the site of the ruins of the historic village. In Soviet times, the village council also included the nearby villages of Aghbulagh and Vanand (now both uninhabited) and a settlement attached to a woodworking factory.

== Geography ==
Shurnukh is located on a scenic, thickly forested mountainside near the river Shurnukh, a small tributary of the Vorotan. It is located on the Goris-Kapan road.

== Demographics ==
Shurnukh's population consisted of 84 residents in 1897, 101 residents in 1926, 351 residents in 1939, 363 in 1959 and 1970, 324 in 1979, 0 in 1989, 148 in 2001 and 197 in 2004. The community's population increased to 224 in 2010, but reduced to 207 people in the 2011 census. In 2016, the population was recorded as 153 people.

According to Syunyats Yerkir magazine, Shurnukh was populated by Azerbaijanis from 1930 to 1989 who fled as a result of the Nagorno-Karabakh conflict, after which the village was repopulated by Armenians who fled from Azerbaijan.

== Sights ==
In the late 2010s, an iron cross was erected on the hill in the centre of the village. The cross lights up in the night.

== Border dispute ==
On 24 December 2020, Shurnukh village head Hakob Arshakyan said that Azerbaijanis were in Shurnukh negotiating with a representative of the Armenian National Security Service and Russian border guards. The Azerbaijani representatives demanded that the Armenian side cede twelve houses located on the eastern side of the Goris-Kapan road to Azerbaijan which, according to Soviet-era maps, fall in the Qubadli District of Azerbaijan bordering Armenia's Syunik Province. Most of Qubadli District was captured by Azerbaijani forces during 2020 Nagorno-Karabakh War, and the remaining parts still under Armenian control were transferred to Azerbaijan according to unwritten provisions of the trilateral agreement which ended the war. Further demarcation according to the administrative borders of the Soviet era raised tensions among the villagers living close to the border and residents of Syunik in general. On 21 December residents of Syunik blocked roads to prevent Prime Minister Nikol Pashinyan from entering the region. The 12 houses were ceded to Azerbaijan on 4 January 2021. There is no frontier post yet, just a small sign, and people can cross freely between parts of the village.

On 9 January the Armenian government announced that it would build 12 new houses in the village to compensate the villagers whose homes came under the control of Azerbaijan. In February 2021, the government announced a compensation package of 300,000 Armenian drams (about US$577) as a single payment followed by a monthly payment of 68,000 Armenian drams (about US$130) for six months, and the start of the construction of a new residential block to provide permanent accommodation to those villagers who lost their homes.

== Gallery ==
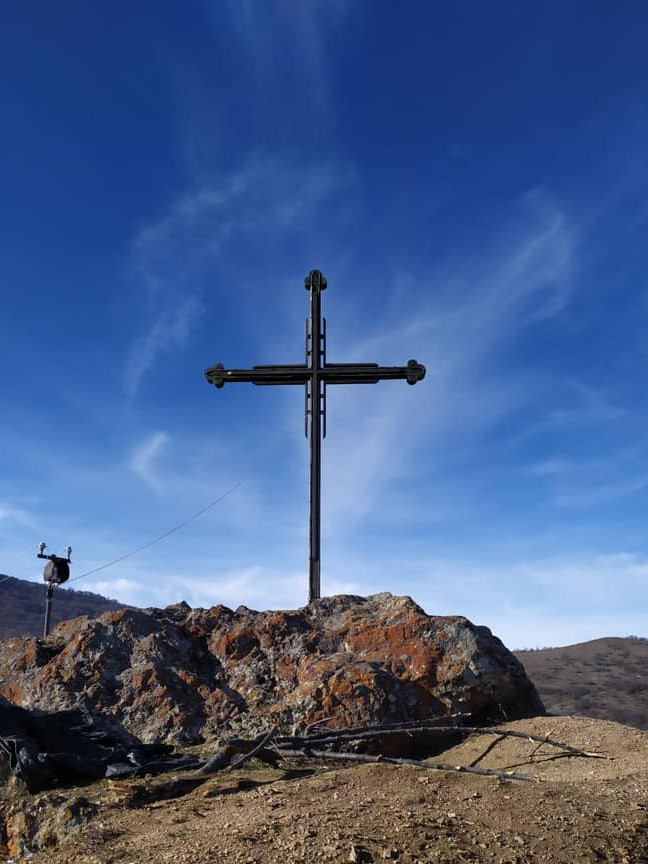
The Shurnukh cross
