= Vorotan (disambiguation) =

Vorotan may refer to:

- Vorotan (river), Armenia and Azerbaijan
- Vorotan Cascade, Armenia
- Vorotan, Armenia
- Vorotnavan, Armenia, formerly Vorotan
- Qubadlı or Vorotan, a town in the Republic of Artsakh
