= Ak-Bulak =

Ak-Bulak (Turkic for "White Spring") may refer to:

- Ak-Bulak, Iran
- Ak-Bulak, Turkmenistan
- Several settlements in Kyrgyzstan:
  - Ak-Bulak, Leylek, Leylek District, Batken Region
  - Ak-Bulak, Kyzyl-Kyya, City of Kyzyl-Kyya, Batken Region
  - Ak-Bulak, Bazar-Korgon, Bazar-Korgon District, Jalal-Abad Region
  - Ak-Bulak, Kyz-Köl, Kyz-Köl rural community, Suzak District, Jalal-Abad Region
  - Ak-Bulak, Kyzyl-Tuu, Kyzyl-Tuu rural community, Suzak District, Jalal-Abad Region
  - Ak-Bulak, Ak-Suu, Ak-Suu District, Issyk-Kul Region
  - Ak-Bulak, Tüp, Tüp District, Issyk-Kul Region
  - Ak-Bulak, Osh, Nookat District, Osh Region

== See also ==
- Aq Bolagh (disambiguation)
- Ağbulaq (disambiguation)
- Akbulak (disambiguation)
- Aq Bulaq (disambiguation)
- FC Ak Bulak, Kazakhstani football club
