= Aqjeh Bolagh =

Aqjeh Bolagh (Persian: اقجه بلاغ) may refer to:

- Aghcheh Bolagh
- Aqbolagh-e Sadat
