= Aghbolagh-e Sofla =

Aghbolagh-e Sofla or Agh Bolagh-e Sofla (Persian: اغبلاغ سفلي) may refer to:

- Aghbolagh-e Sofla, Maragheh, East Azerbaijan Province
- Aghbolagh-e Sofla, Varzaqan, East Azerbaijan Province
- Agh Bolagh-e Sofla, West Azerbaijan
