= Spandaryan, Syunik =

Spandaryan Սպանդարյան
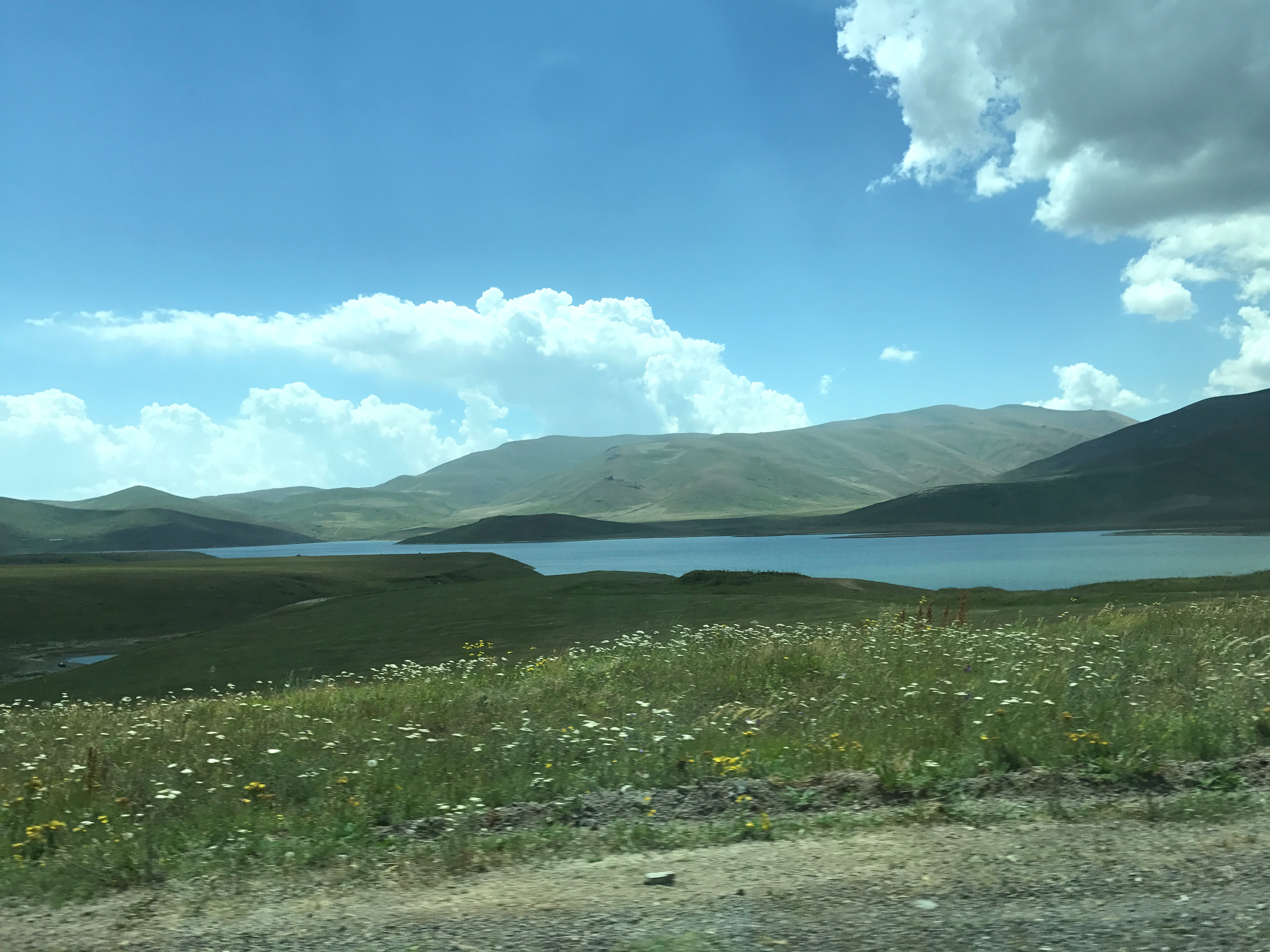
- Scenery around Spandaryan Reservoir

- Location within Armenia Location within Syunik Province
- Coordinates: 39°37′18″N 45°54′17″E
- Country: Armenia
- Province: Syunik
- Municipality: Sisian

Area
  - Total: 23.76 km^{2} (9.17 sq mi)

Population (2011)
  - Total: 371
  - Density: 15.6/km^{2} (40.4/sq mi)
- Time zone: UTC+4 (AMT)

Spandaryan (Armenian: Սպանդարյան) is a village in the Sisian Municipality of the Syunik Province in Armenia. The area around the village contains the Spandaryan Hydro Power Plant, one of Armenia's largest hydro power plants and the Spandaryan Reservoir to the northwest of the village itself.

== Toponymy ==
The village was previously known as Meliklar, Maliklar, Meliklu and Kalachik.

== Demographics ==
The Statistical Committee of Armenia reported its population was 486 in 2010, up from 446 at the 2001 census.

== Gallery ==
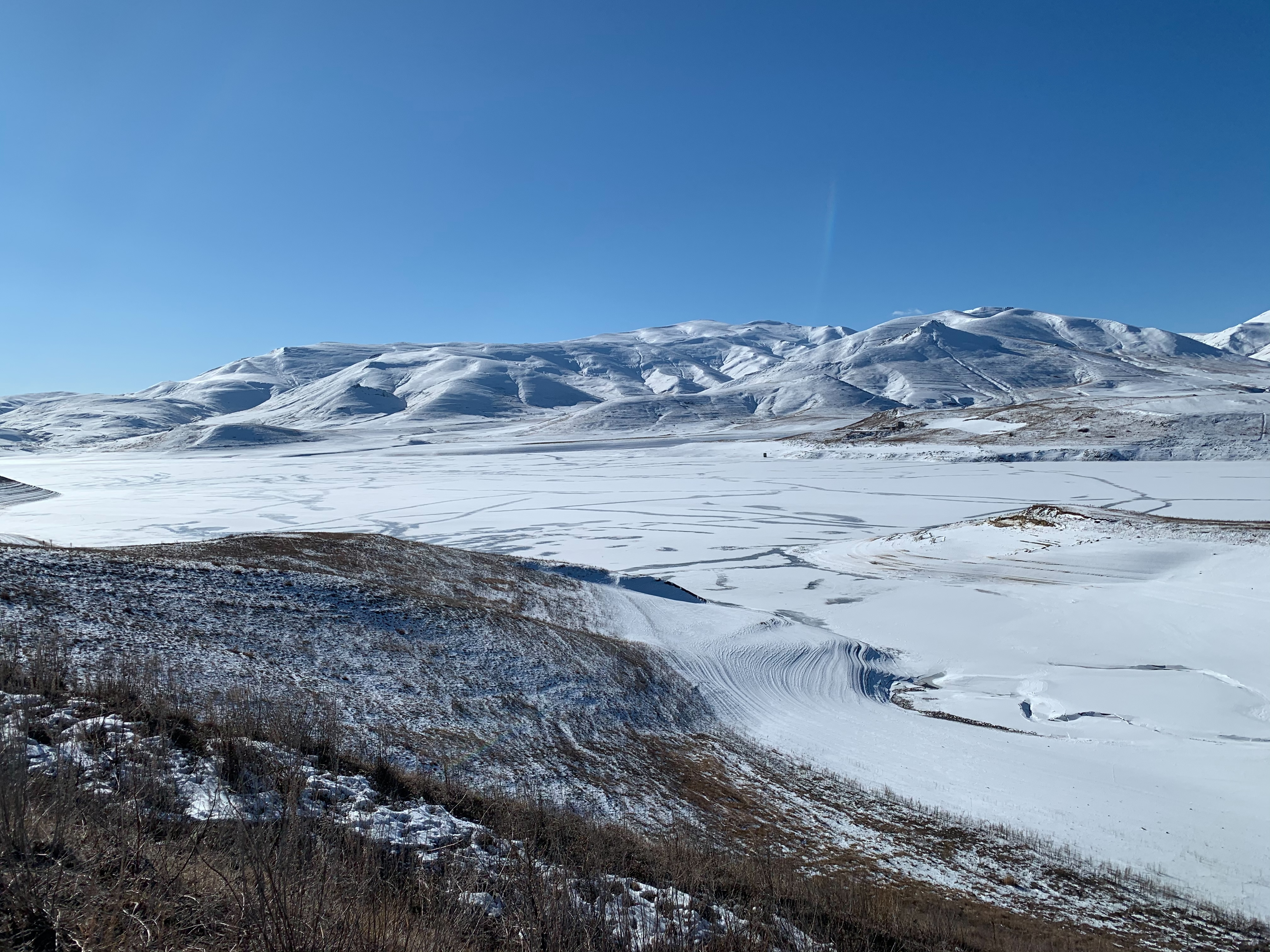
Spandaryan Reservoir in Winter

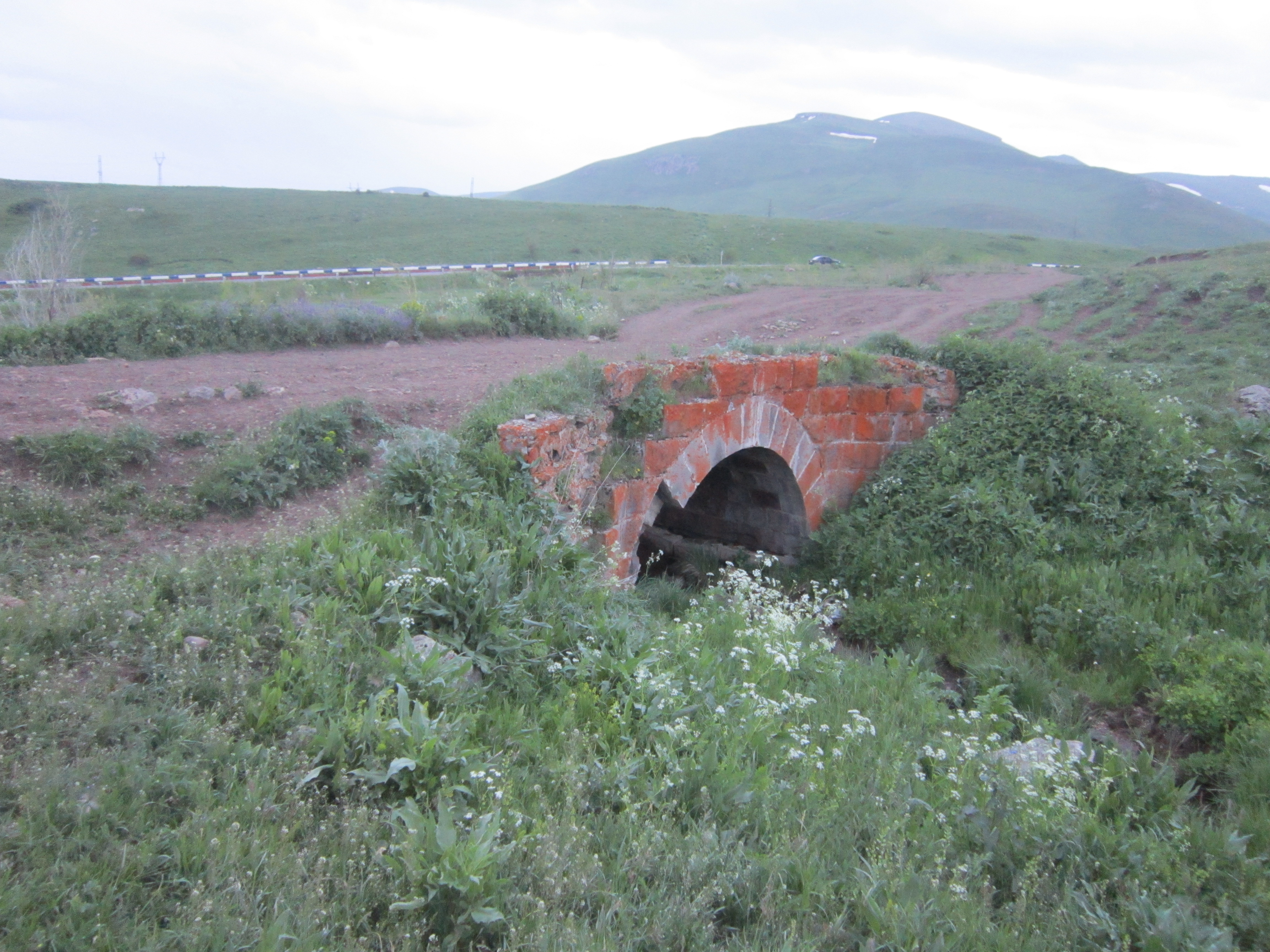
Bridge in Spandaryan

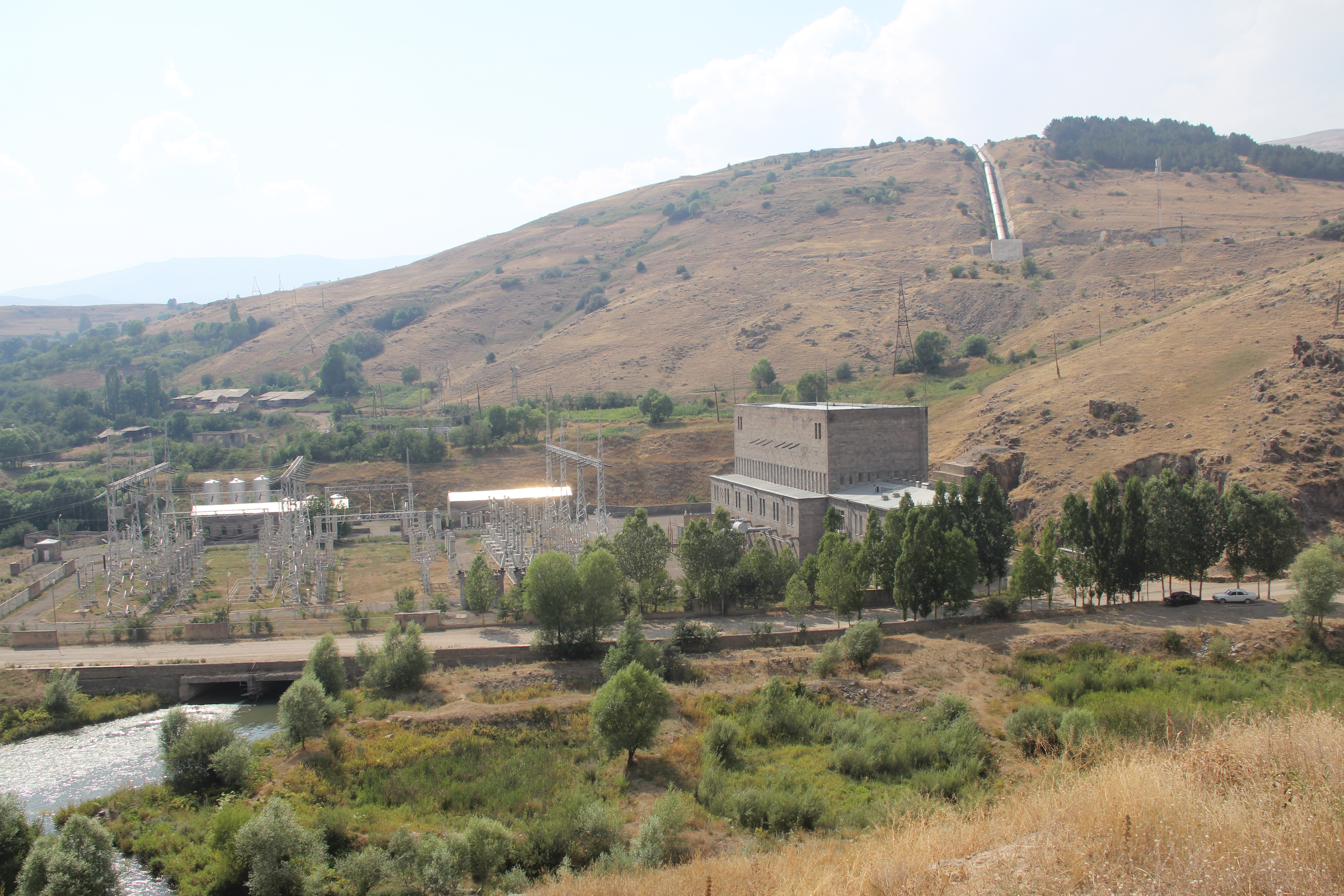
Spandaryan Hydro Power Plant

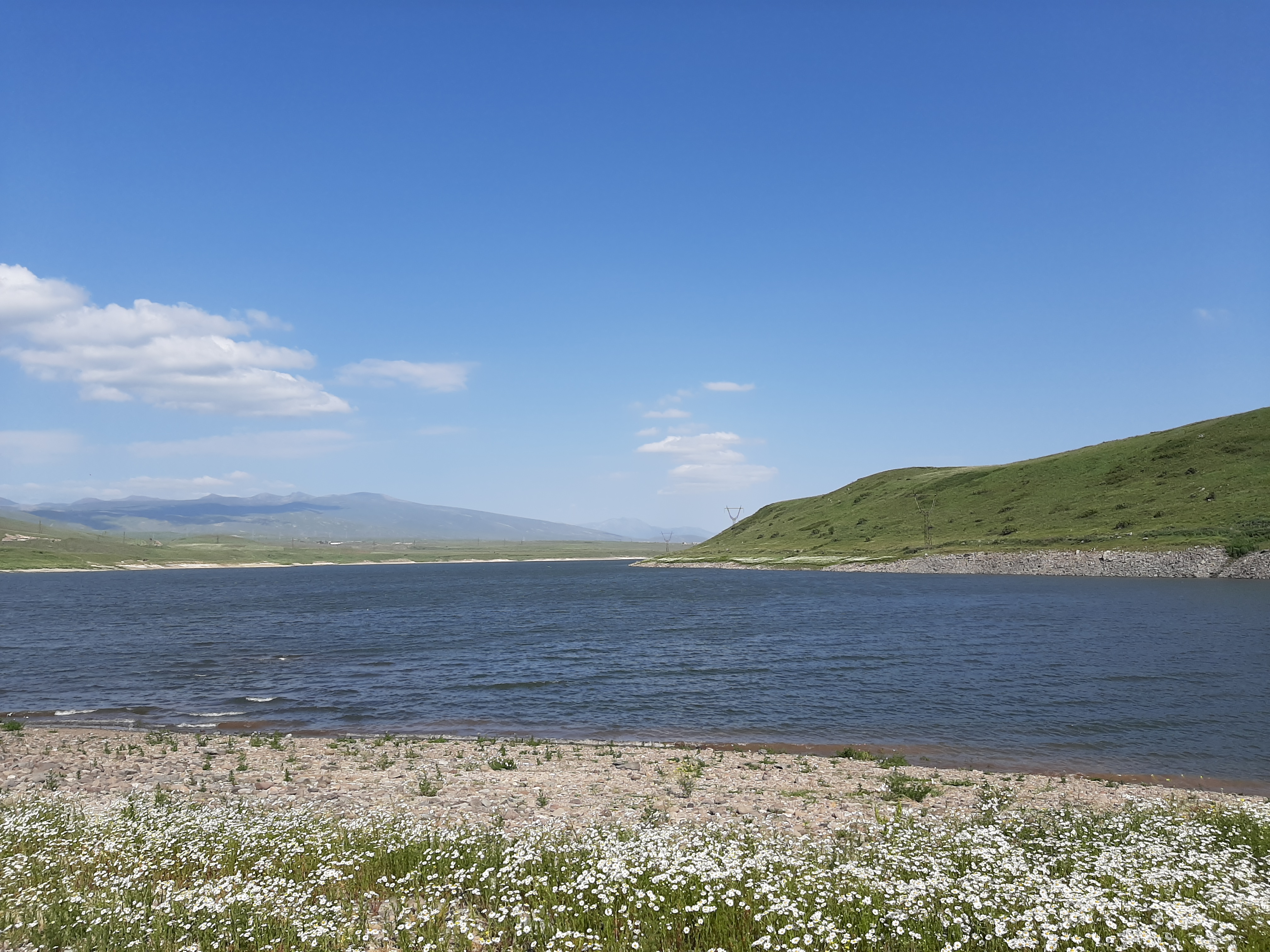
Spandaryan Reservoir
