= Akbulak =

Akbulak may refer to:

- Akbulak, Kazakhstan
- Akbulak, Russia, a rural locality (a settlement) in Akbulaksky District of Orenburg Oblast, Russia
- Akbulak, Kulp
- Akbulak, Karakoçan

== See also ==
- Ağbulaq (disambiguation)
- Ak-Bulak (disambiguation)
- Aq Bolagh (disambiguation)
- Aq Bulaq (disambiguation)
