= Hartashen, Syunik =

Hartashen Հարթաշեն
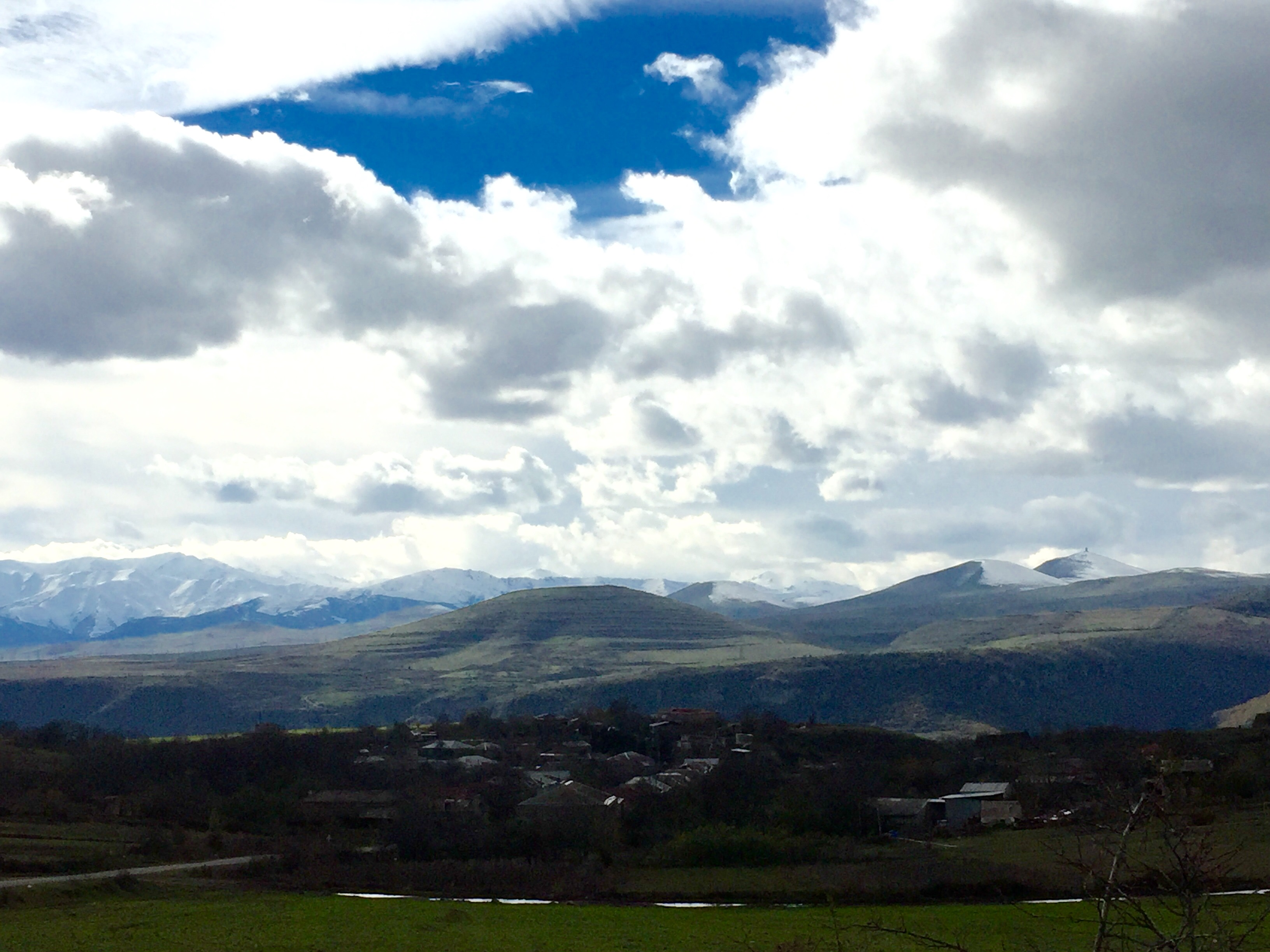

- Location within Armenia Location within Syunik Province
- Coordinates: 39°29′09″N 46°25′11″E
- Country: Armenia
- Province: Syunik
- Municipality: Goris

Area
  - Total: 30.99 km^{2} (11.97 sq mi)

Population (2011)
  - Total: 717
  - Density: 23.1/km^{2} (59.9/sq mi)
- Time zone: UTC+4 (AMT)

Hartashen (Armenian: Հարթաշեն) is a village in the Goris Municipality of the Syunik Province in Armenia.

== Toponymy ==
The village has previously been known as Aigedzor, Azatashen-Alighuli, Këru, At’ghunk’, Alikulik’yand, Last, Alighulashen, Alighuli Ashaghy and Dzorashen.

== Demographics ==
The Statistical Committee of Armenia reported its population was 717 in 2010, up from 662 at the 2001 census.
