= Akner, Syunik =

Akner Ակներ
- Location within Armenia Location within Syunik Province
- Coordinates: 39°30′24″N 46°18′31″E
- Country: Armenia
- Province: Syunik
- Municipality: Goris

Area
  - Total: 1.89 km^{2} (0.73 sq mi)

Population (2011)
  - Total: 1,374
  - Density: 727/km^{2} (1,880/sq mi)
- Time zone: UTC+4 (AMT)

Akner (Armenian: Ակներ) is a village in the Goris Municipality of the Syunik Province in Armenia.

== Etymology ==
The village was previously known as Brun (Armenian: Բռուն).

== Demographics ==
The Statistical Committee of Armenia reported its population as 1,338 in 2010, up from 1,116 at the 2001 census.
