= Verishen =

Verishen Վերիշեն
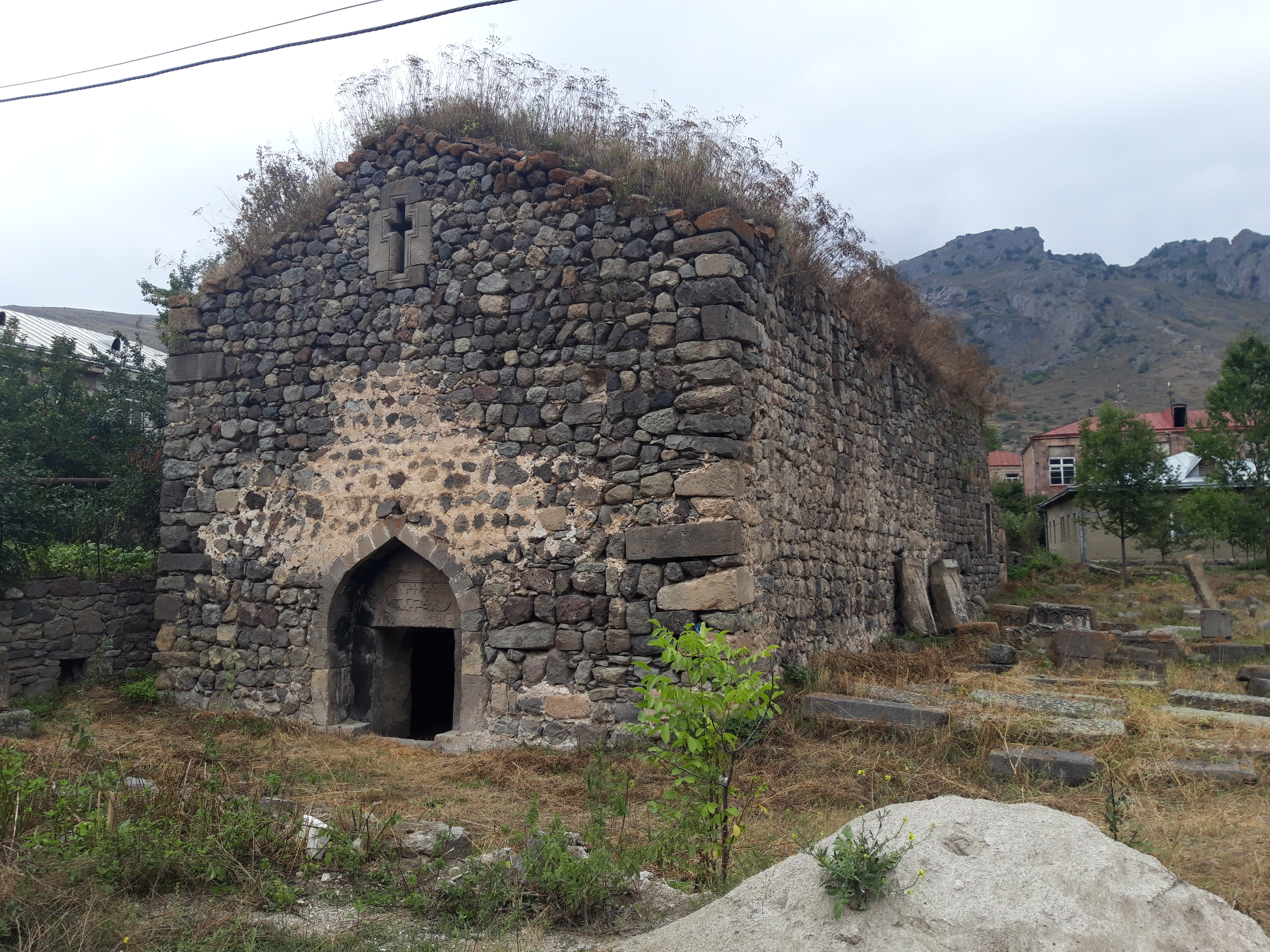
- Surb Hripsime Church (Սուրբ Հռիփսիմե եկեղեցի) in Verishen

- Location within Armenia Location within Syunik Province
- Coordinates: 39°32′09″N 46°18′43″E
- Country: Armenia
- Province: Syunik
- Municipality: Goris

Area
  - Total: 24.86 km^{2} (9.60 sq mi)

Population (2011)
  - Total: 2,264
  - Density: 91.07/km^{2} (235.9/sq mi)
- Time zone: UTC+4 (AMT)

Verishen (Armenian: Վերիշեն) is a village in the Goris Municipality of the Syunik Province in Armenia.

== Demographics ==
The Statistical Committee of Armenia reported its population was 2,532 in 2010, up from 2,314 at the 2001 census.

== Gallery ==
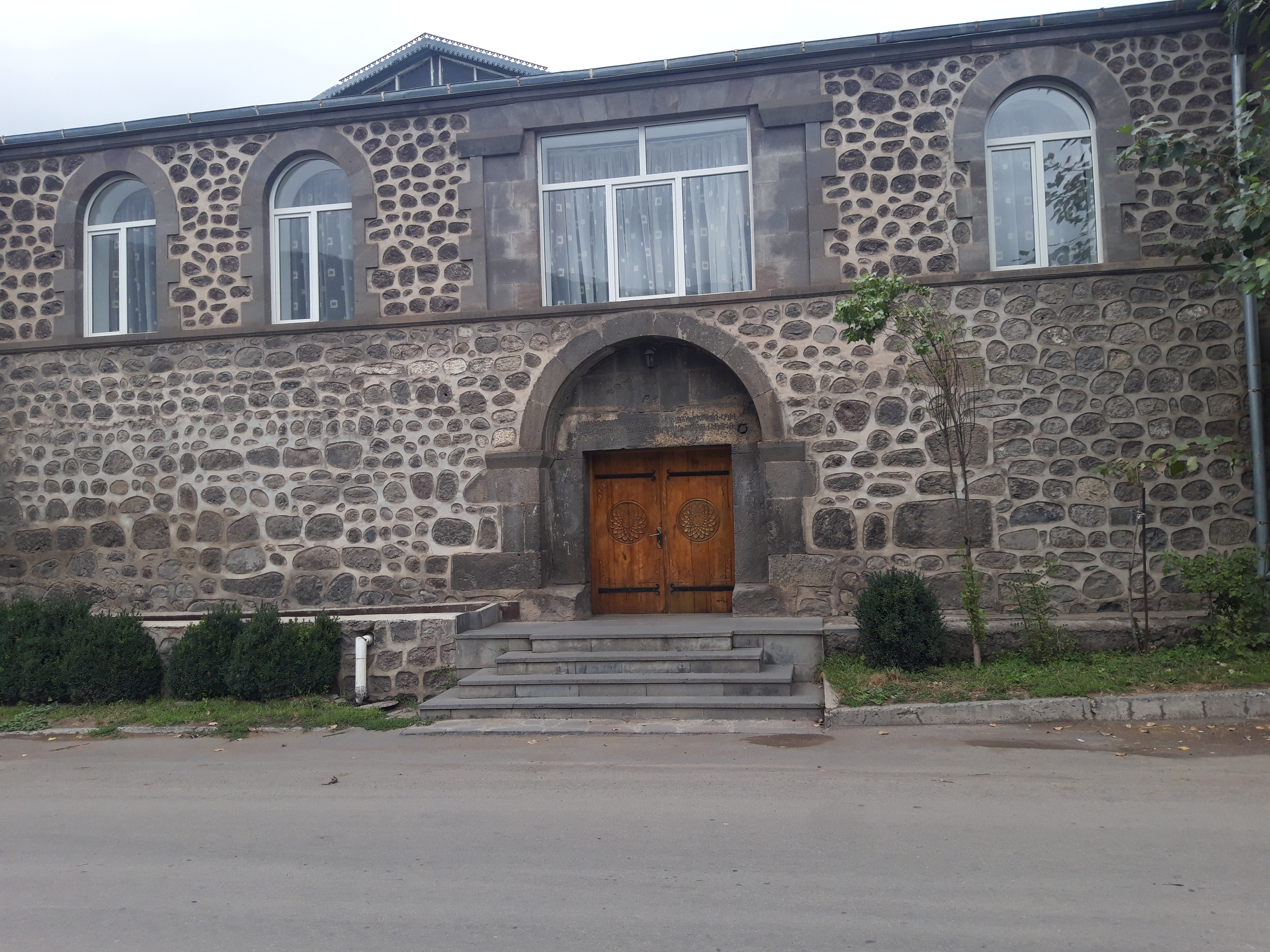
Darakhani House

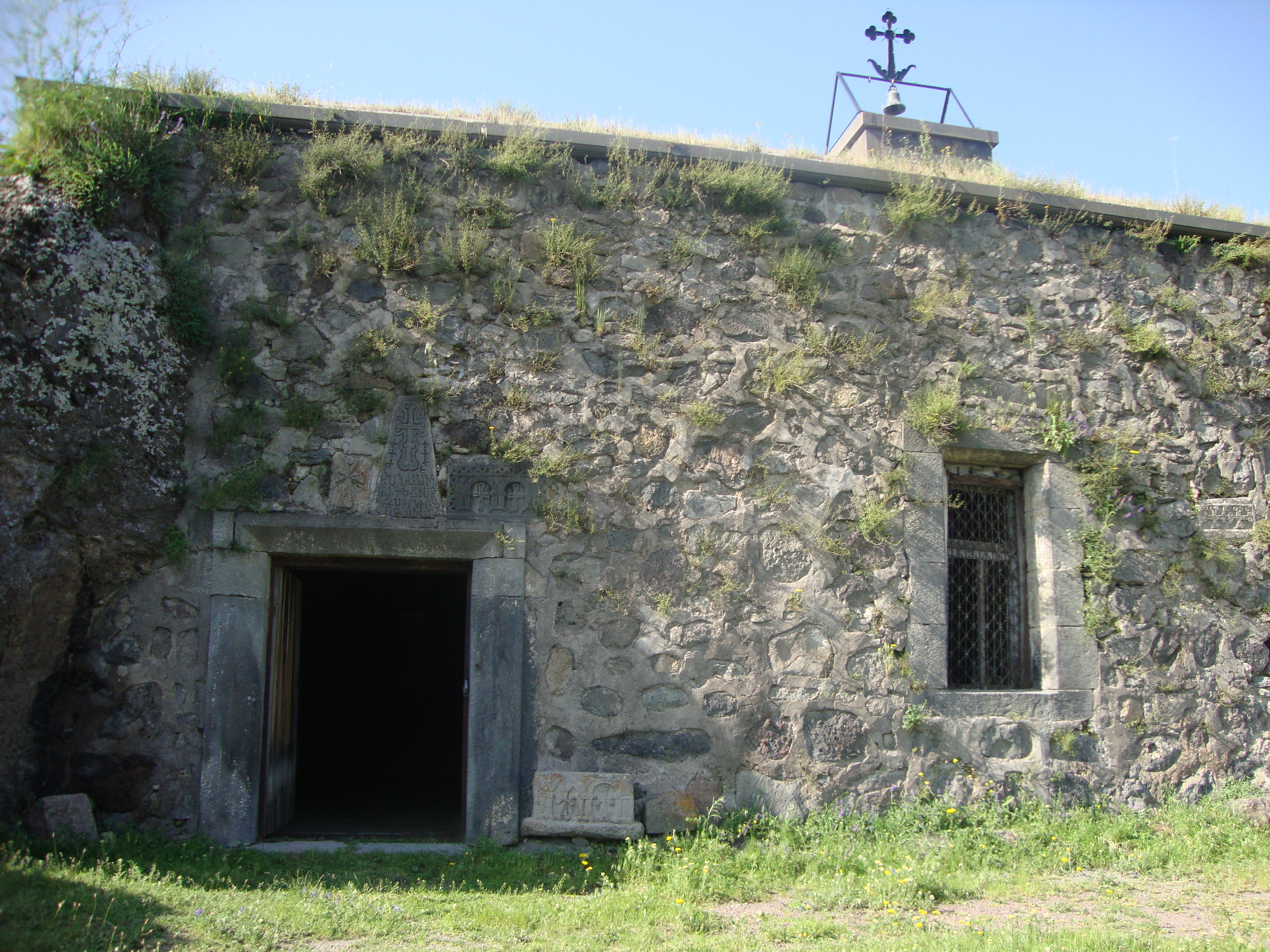
Surb Noraknunk Church (Սուրբ Նորակնունք եկեղեցի)

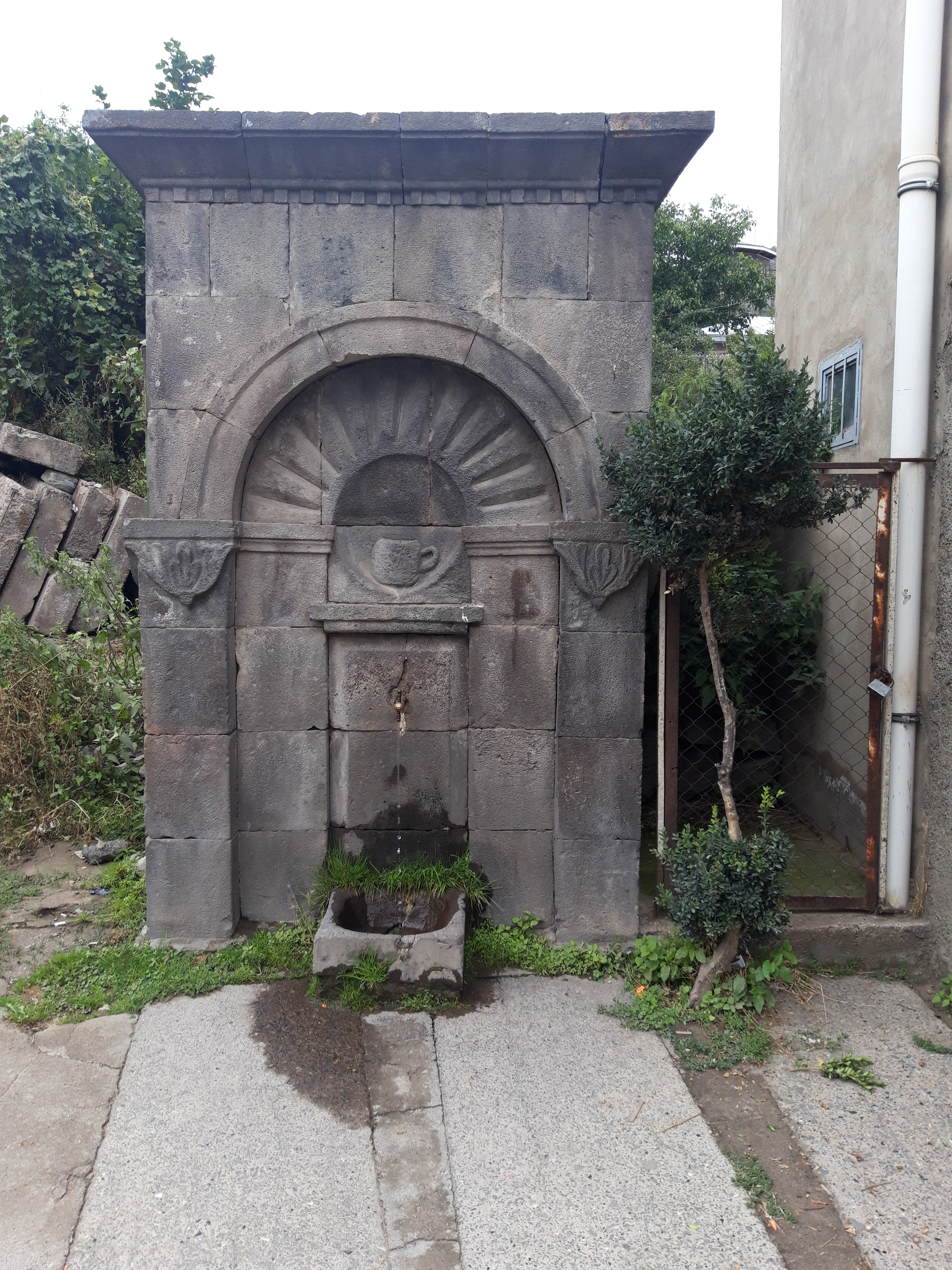
Spring in Verishen

== Notable people ==
- Gago Drago, is an Armenian-born Dutch welterweight kickboxer
