= Goris Municipality =

Goris Գորիս
- Urban Community
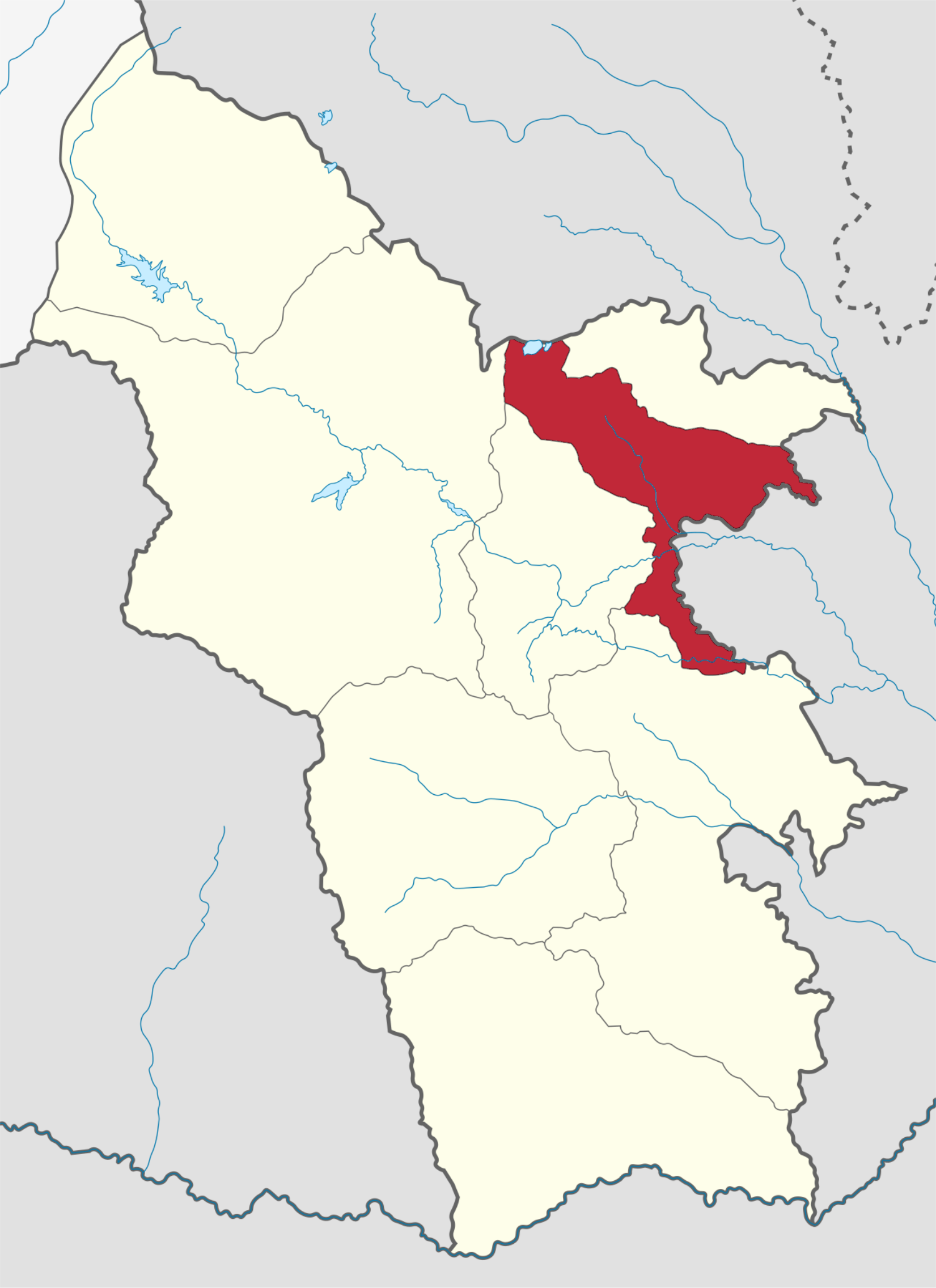
- Coordinates: 39°30′N 46°21′E
- Country: Armenia
- Province: Syunik
- Formed: 17 June 2016
- Administrative centre: Goris

Government
  - Mayor: Arush Arushanyan

Population (2011 census)
  - Total: 29,173
- Time zone: AMT (UTC+04)
- Postal code: 3201–3519
- ISO 3166 code: AM-SU
- FIPS 10-4: AM08

Goris Municipality, referred to as Goris Community (Armenian: Գորիս Համայնք Goris Hamaynk), is an urban community and administrative subdivision of Syunik Province of Armenia, at the south of the country. Consisted of a group of settlements, its administrative centre is the town of Goris.

== Included settlements ==
Settlement	Type	Population (2011 census)
Goris	Town, administrative centre	20,591
Akner	Village	1,374
Hartashen	Village	717
Karahunj	Village	1,365
Khndzoresk	Village	2,070
Nerkin Khndzoresk	Village	276
Shurnukh	Village	207
Verishen	Village	2,264
Vorotan	Village	309
Aghbulagh	Abandoned village	0
Dzorak	Abandoned village	0
Vanand	Abandoned village	0

== Politics ==
Goris Municipal Assembly (Armenian: Գորիսի համայնքապետարան, Gorisi hamaynqapetaran) is the representative body in Goris Municipality, consisting of 21 members which are elected every five years. The last election was held in October 2021. Arush Arushanyan of Arush Arushanyan alliance was elected mayor.

Party	2021	Current Municipal Assembly
**Arush Arushanyan alliance**	**13**	
Civil Contract	**7**	
Armenian National Congress	**1**	
Total	21	

Ruling coalition or party marked in bold.

Arush Arushanyan alliance is an alliance between Reborn Armenia and National Agenda Party.

== See also ==
- Syunik Province
