= Karahunj =

Karahunj Քարահունջ
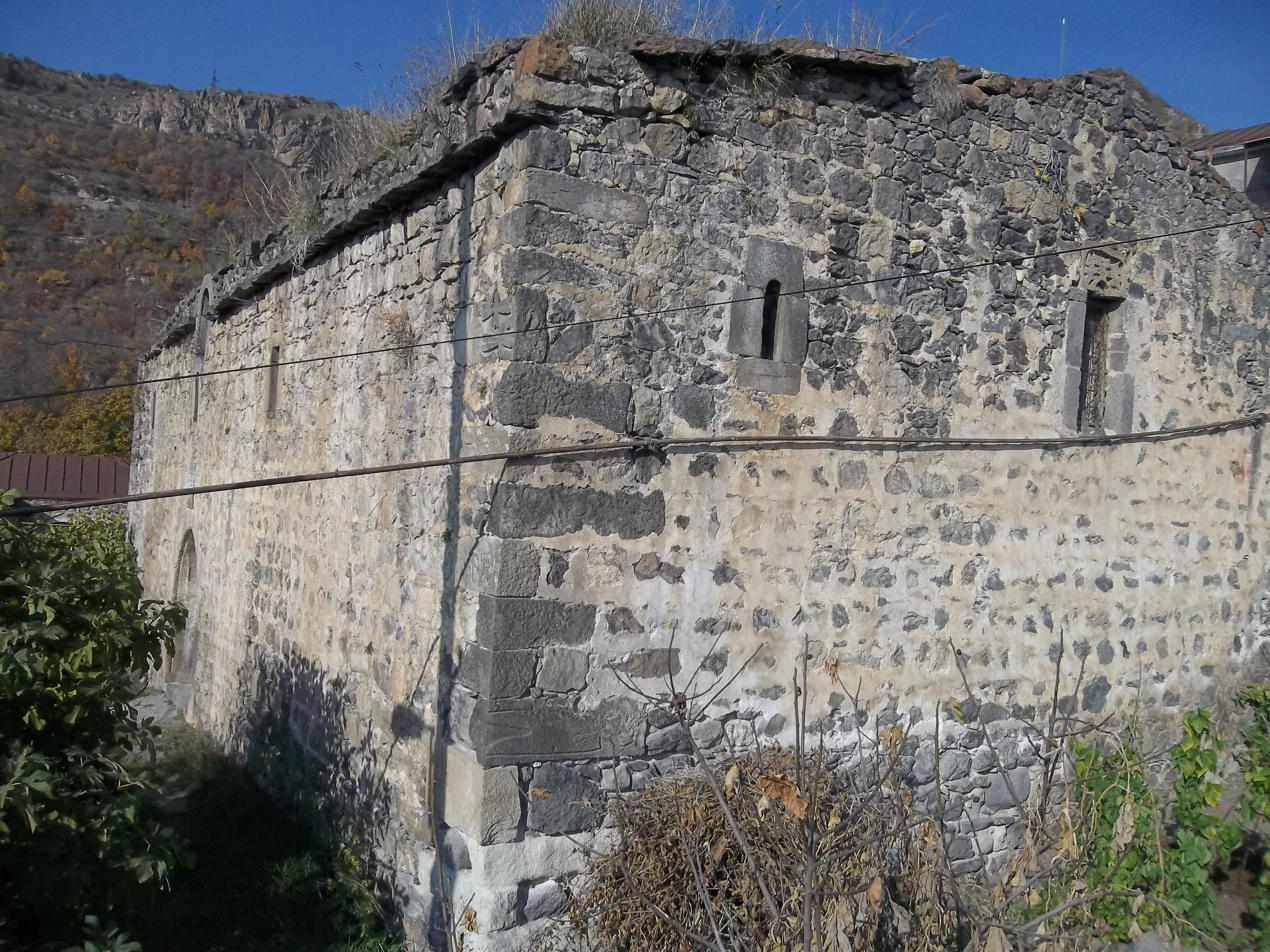
- Saint Hripsime Church in Karahunj

- Location within Armenia Location within Syunik Province
- Coordinates: 39°28′45″N 46°21′32″E
- Country: Armenia
- Province: Syunik
- Municipality: Goris

Area
  - Total: 19.16 km^{2} (7.40 sq mi)

Population (2011)
  - Total: 1,365
  - Density: 71.24/km^{2} (184.5/sq mi)
- Time zone: UTC+4 (AMT)

Karahunj (Armenian: Քարահունջ) is a village in the Goris Municipality of the Syunik Province in Armenia.

== Demographics ==
The Statistical Committee of Armenia reported its population was 1,303 in 2010, up from 1,254 at the 2001 census.

== Gallery ==
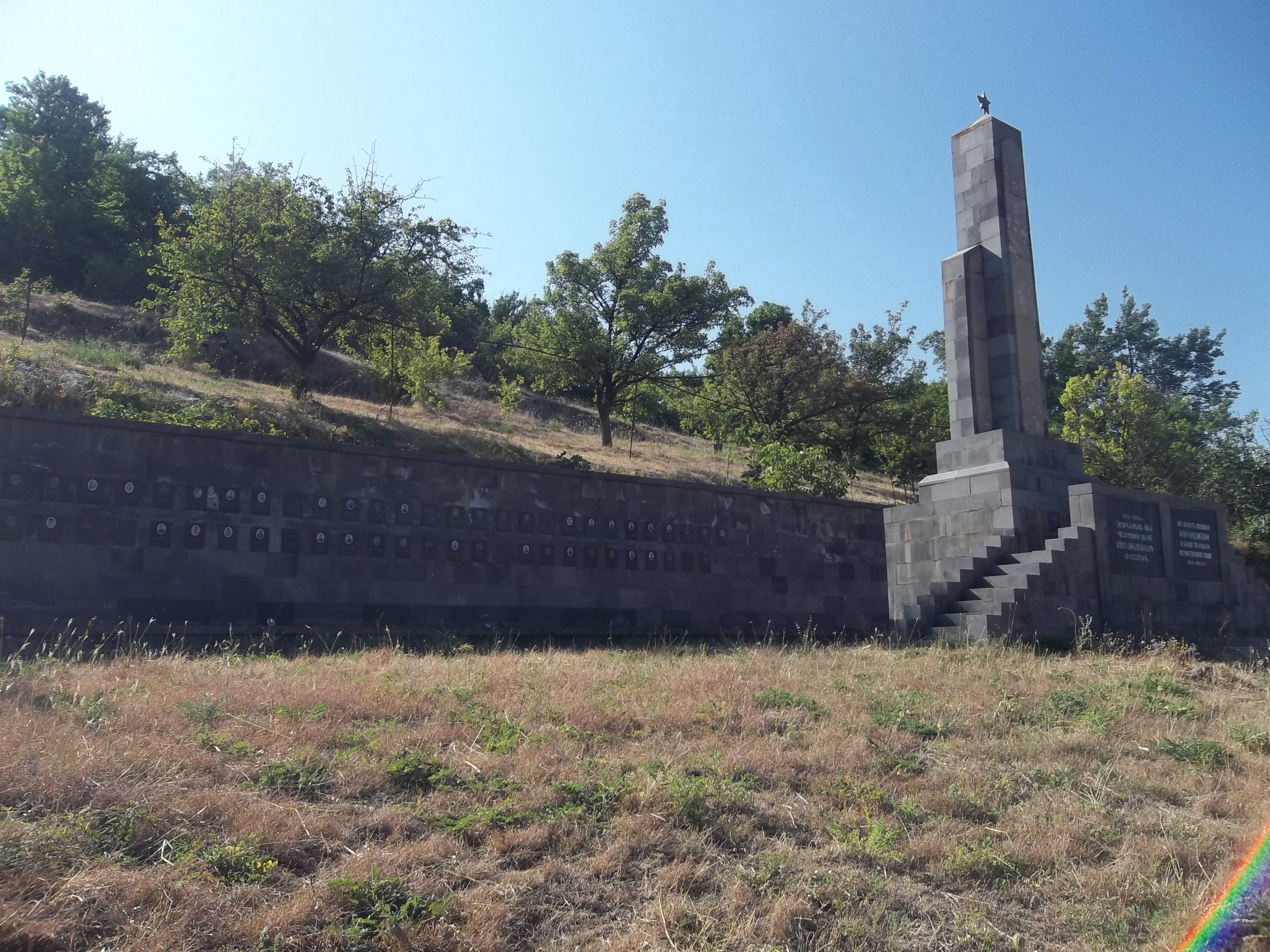
WW2 memorial

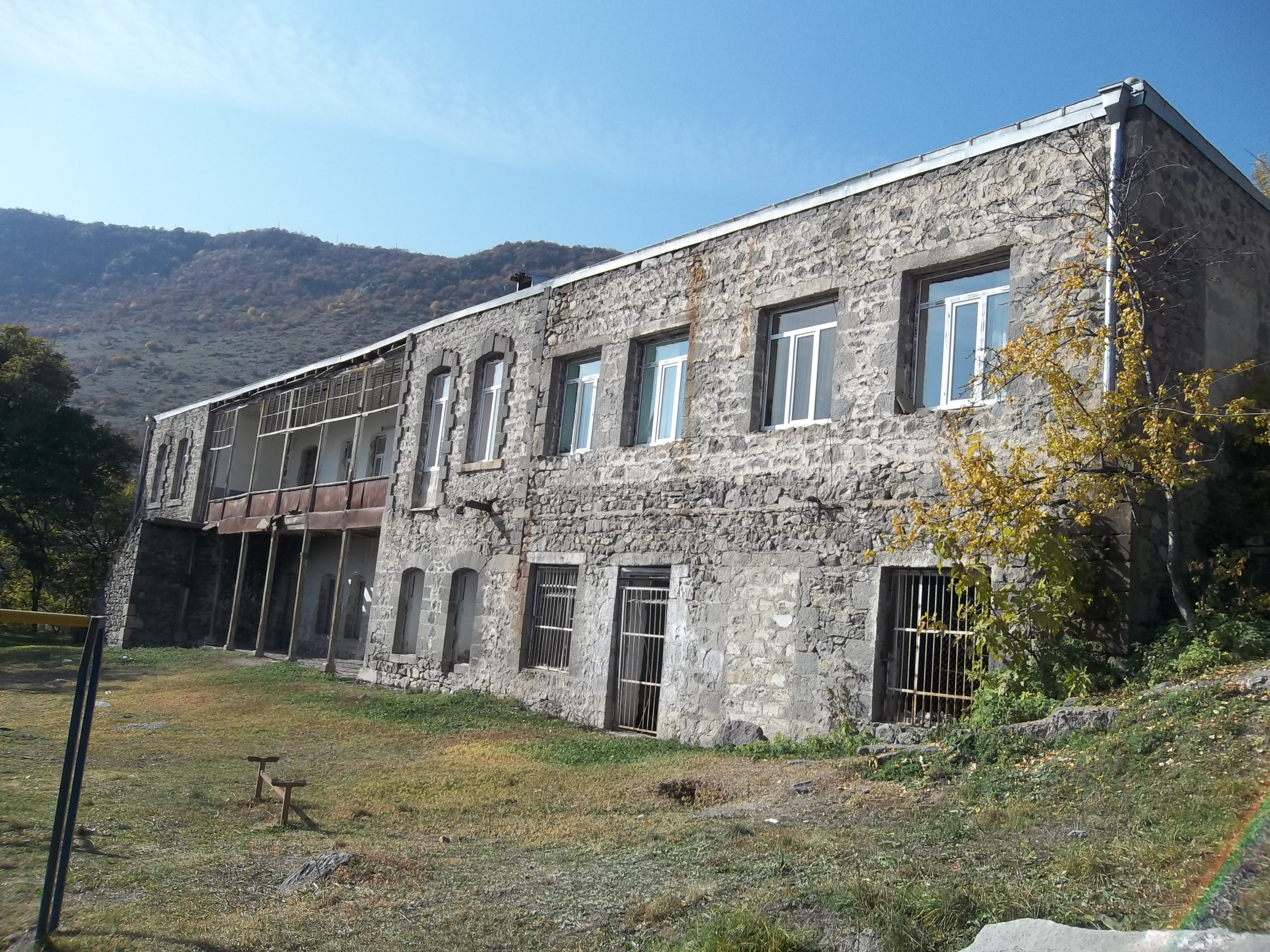
School

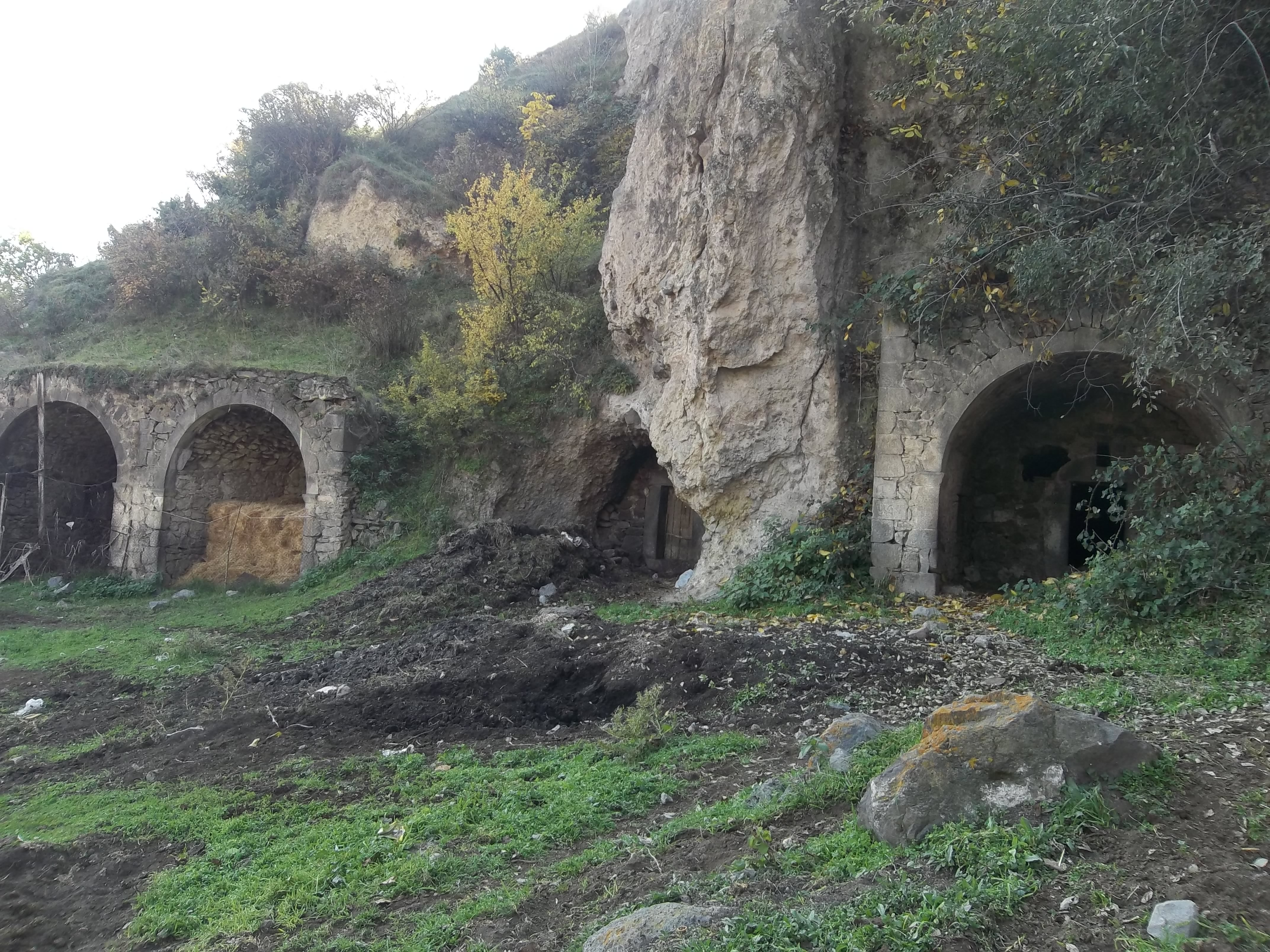
Scenery

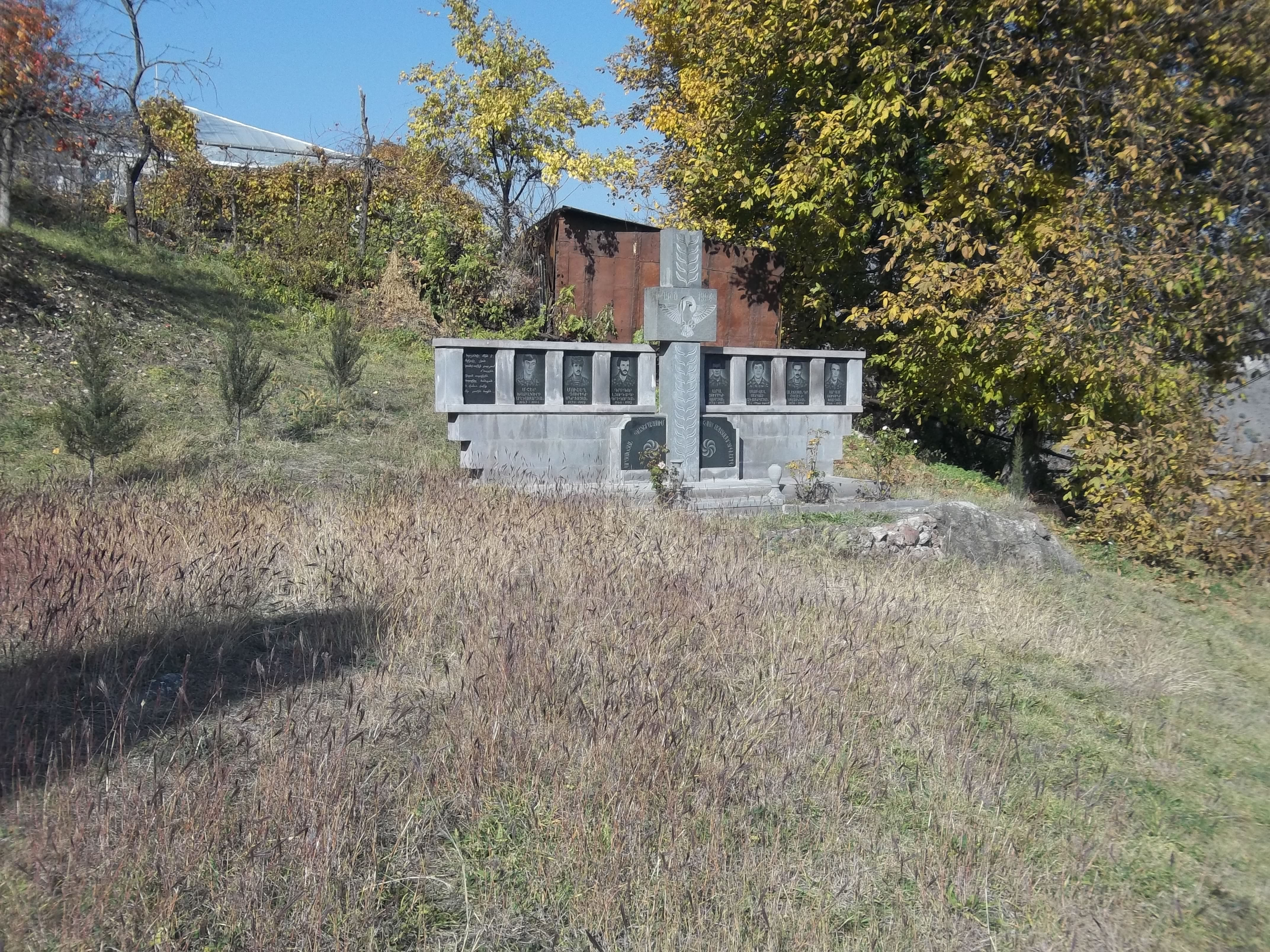
Memorial for the fallen in the First Nagorno-Karabakh War

== Notable people ==
- Norair Aslanyan (1991-), footballer
