= Albolagh, Mahabad =

Albolagh البلاغ
- Village
- Location within Iran
- Coordinates: 36°50′32″N 45°38′55″E
- Country: Iran
- Province: West Azerbaijan
- County: Mahabad
- Bakhsh: Central
- Rural District: Mokriyan-e Gharbi

Population (2006)
  - Total: 145
- Time zone: UTC+3:30 (IRST)
  - Summer (DST): UTC+4:30 (IRDT)

Albolagh (Persian: البلاغ, also Romanized as Ālbolāgh and Āl Bolāgh) is a village in Mokriyan-e Gharbi Rural District, in the Central District of Mahabad County, West Azerbaijan Province, Iran. At the 2006 census, its population was 145, in 26 families.
