= Aqbolagh, Lorestan =

Aqbolagh اقبلاغ
- Village
- Location within Iran
- Coordinates: 33°37′01″N 49°26′05″E
- Country: Iran
- Province: Lorestan
- County: Azna
- Bakhsh: Japelaq
- Rural District: Japelaq-e Sharqi

Population (2006)
  - Total: 61
- Time zone: UTC+3:30 (IRST)
  - Summer (DST): UTC+4:30 (IRDT)

Aqbolagh (Persian: اقبلاغ, also Romanized as Āqbolāgh and Āq Bolāgh; also known as Āq Bolāgh-e Fūzīyeh, Āq Bolāgh-e Somayyeh, and Āq Bolāgh Fowzīyeh) is a village in Japelaq-e Sharqi Rural District, Japelaq District, Azna County, Lorestan Province, Iran. At the 2006 census, its population was 61, in 21 families.
