= Aghbolagh, Urmia =

Aghbolagh اغبلاغ
- Village
- Location within Iran
- Coordinates: 37°21′40″N 45°02′36″E
- Country: Iran
- Province: West Azerbaijan
- County: Urmia
- Bakhsh: Central
- Rural District: Baranduzchay-ye Jonubi

Population (2006)
  - Total: 335
- Time zone: UTC+3:30 (IRST)
  - Summer (DST): UTC+4:30 (IRDT)

Aghbolagh (Persian: اغبلاغ, also Romanized as Āghbolāgh; also known as Āqbolāgh and Āq Bolāgh) is a village in Baranduzchay-ye Jonubi Rural District, in the Central District of Urmia County, West Azerbaijan Province, Iran. At the 2006 census, its population was 335, in 47 families.
