= Agh Bolagh, Jolfa =

Agh Bolagh اغبلاغ
- Village
- Location within Iran
- Coordinates: 38°48′40″N 45°32′55″E
- Country: Iran
- Province: East Azerbaijan
- County: Jolfa
- Bakhsh: Central
- Rural District: Shoja

Population (2006)
  - Total: 83
- Time zone: UTC+3:30 (IRST)
  - Summer (DST): UTC+4:30 (IRDT)

Agh Bolagh (Persian: اغبلاغ, also Romanized as Āgh Bolāgh; also known as Āq Bolāgh) is a village in Shoja Rural District, in the Central District of Jolfa County, East Azerbaijan Province, Iran. At the 2006 census, its population was 83, in 25 families.
