= Aq Bolagh, Saral =

Aq Bolagh آق بلاغ
- Village
- Location within Iran
- Coordinates: 35°37′26″N 46°45′40″E
- Country: Iran
- Province: Kurdistan
- County: Divandarreh
- Bakhsh: Saral
- Rural District: Saral

Population (2006)
  - Total: 62
- Time zone: UTC+3:30 (IRST)
  - Summer (DST): UTC+4:30 (IRDT)

Aq Bolagh (Persian: آق بلاغ, also Romanized as Āq Bolāgh and Āqbolāgh; also known as Āl Bolākh and Āqbolāq) is a village in Saral Rural District, Saral District, Divandarreh County, Kurdistan Province, Iran. At the 2006 census, its population was 62, in 14 families. The village is populated by Kurds.
