= Aghbolagh-e Suqar =

Aghbolagh-e Suqar اغبلاغ سقار
- Village
- Location within Iran
- Coordinates: 39°05′09″N 44°44′49″E
- Country: Iran
- Province: West Azerbaijan
- County: Showt
- Bakhsh: Central
- Rural District: Qarah Quyun-e Shomali

Population (2006)
  - Total: 34
- Time zone: UTC+3:30 (IRST)
  - Summer (DST): UTC+4:30 (IRDT)

Aghbolagh-e Suqar (Persian: اغبلاغ سقار, also Romanized as Āghbolāgh-e Sūqār and Āghbolāgh-e Sūqqār) is a village in Qarah Quyun-e Shomali Rural District, in the Central District of Showt County, West Azerbaijan Province, Iran. At the 2006 census, its population was 34, in 5 families.
