= Vorotan Cascade =

- Locations of the Vorotan Cascade power plants in Armenia
- Country: Armenia
- Location: Syunik Province
- Purpose: Hydroelectricity; Irrigation
- Status: Operational
- Construction began: 1961
- Owner: ContourGlobal
- Operator: ContourGlobal Hydro Cascade CJSC
- Website www.vorotancascade.am
- Spandaryan HPP
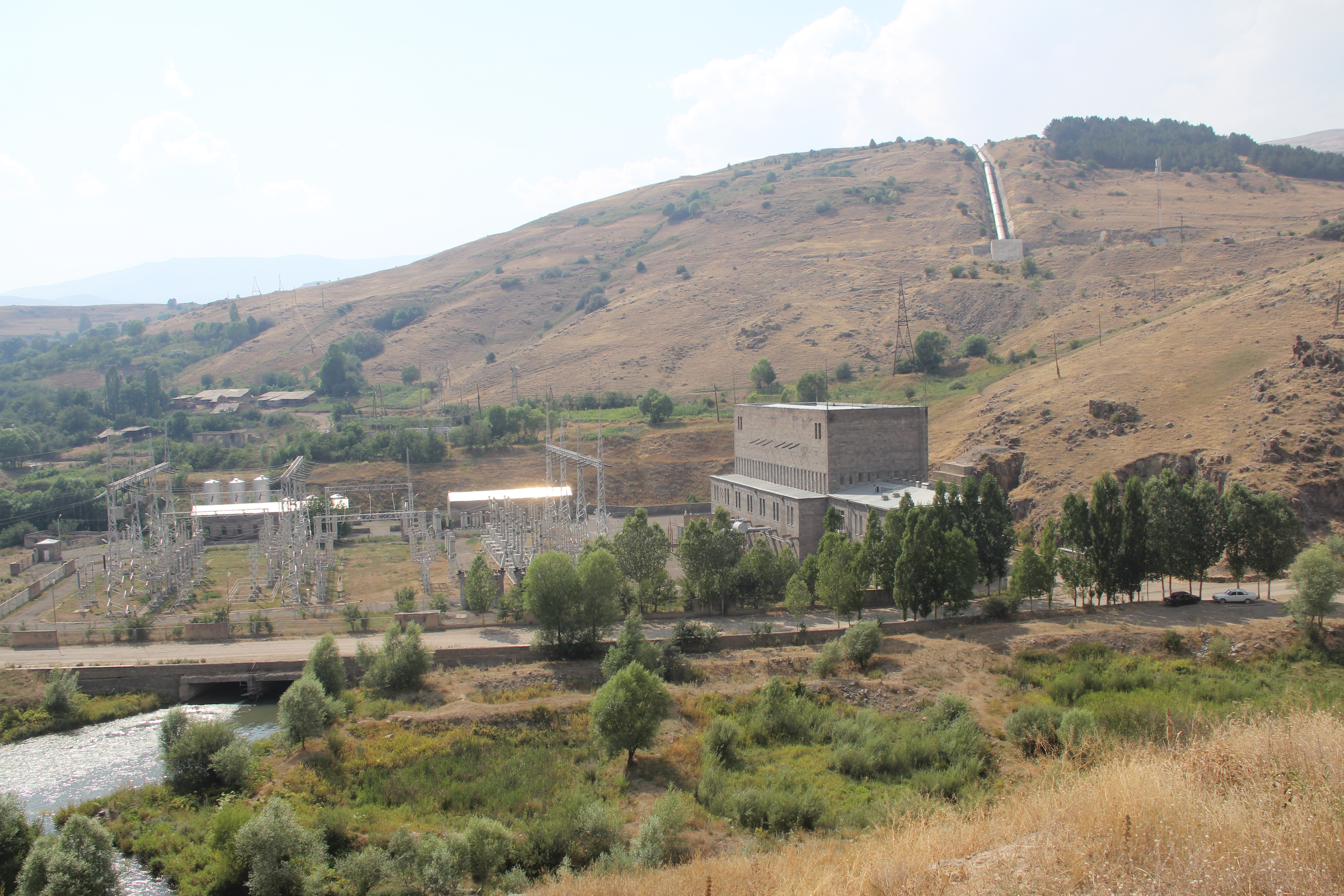
- Interactive map of Spandaryan HPP
- Location: Shaghat
- Coordinates: 39°34′25″N 45°54′47″E
- Status: Operational
- Opening date: 1989

Dam and spillways
- Type of dam: Embankment type, mixed rockfill and earthfill
- Height (foundation): 89 m (292 ft)
- Height (thalweg): 83 m (272 ft)
- Length: 315 m (1,033 ft)
- Width (crest): 10 m (33 ft)

Reservoir
- Creates: Spandaryan Reservoir
- Total capacity: 257,000,000 m^{3} (208,000 acre⋅ft)
- Active capacity: 218,000,000 m^{3} (177,000 acre⋅ft)
- Surface area: 10.8 km^{2} (4.2 sq mi)
- Maximum length: 7 km (4.3 mi)
- Maximum width: 3 km (1.9 mi)
- Maximum water depth: 73 m (240 ft)
- Normal elevation: 2,060 m (6,760 ft)

Power Station
- Turbines: 2 X 38 MW
- Installed capacity: 76 MW
- Annual generation: 210 GWh
- Shamb HPP
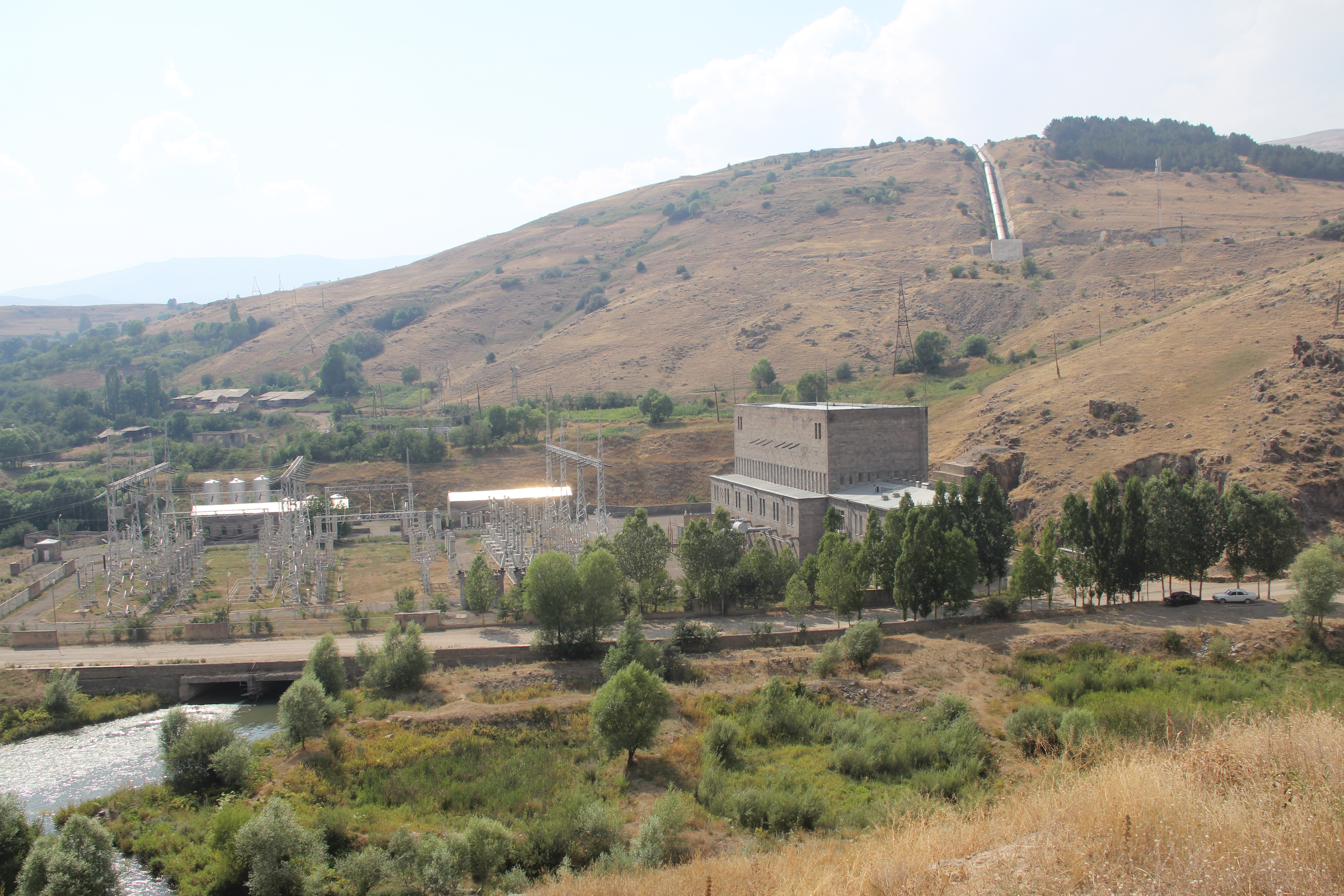
- Interactive map of Shamb HPP
- Location: Shamb
- Coordinates: 39°26′13″N 46°09′00″E
- Status: Operational
- Opening date: 1978

Dam and spillways
- Type of dam: Concrete spillway dam (Angeghakot Dam); Embankment dam, sandy gravel and soil (Tolors Dam)
- Height (thalweg): 23.4 m (77 ft) (Angeghakot Dam); 69 m (226 ft) (Tolors Dam)
- Length: 188 m (617 ft) (Tolors Dam)

Reservoir
- Creates: Angeghakot Reservoir; Tolors Reservoir
- Total capacity: 3,400,000 cubic metres (2,800 acre⋅ft) (Angeghakot Reservoir); 96,000,000 m^{3} (78,000 acre⋅ft) (Tolors Reservoir)
- Active capacity: 80,000,000 m^{3} (65,000 acre⋅ft) (Tolors Reservoir)
- Normal elevation: 1,651.1 m (5,417 ft)

Power Station
- Turbines: 2 X 85.5 MW
- Installed capacity: 171 MW
- Annual generation: 320 GWh
- Tatev HPP
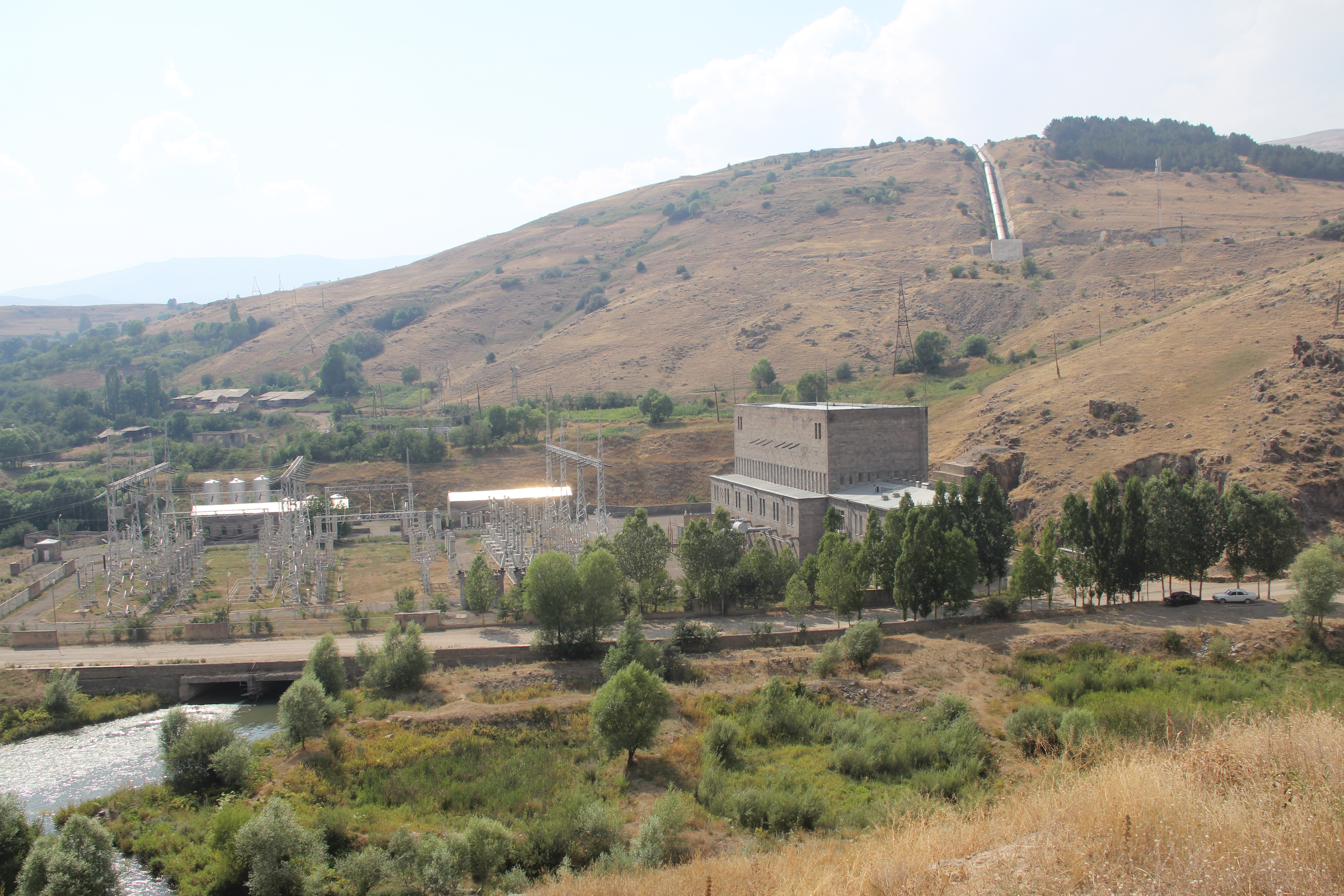
- Interactive map of Tatev HPP
- Location: Tatev
- Coordinates: 39°25′39″N 46°22′15″E
- Status: Operational
- Opening date: 1970

Dam and spillways
- Type of dam: Embankment type, sandy gravel
- Height (thalweg): 41 m (135 ft)
- Length: 107 m (351 ft)
- Spillway capacity: 312 m^{3}/s (11,000 cu ft/s)

Reservoir
- Creates: Tatev Reservoir
- Total capacity: 13,600,000 m^{3} (11,000 acre⋅ft)
- Active capacity: 1,800,000 m^{3} (1,500 acre⋅ft)
- Normal elevation: 1,335.4 m (4,381 ft)

Power Station
- Hydraulic head: 568.8 m (1,866 ft)
- Turbines: 3 x 52.4 MW Pelton turbines
- Installed capacity: 157.2 MW
- Annual generation: 670 GWh

The Vorotan Cascade, or the ContourGlobal Hydro Cascade, is a cascade on the Vorotan River in Syunik Province, Armenia. It was built to produce hydroelectric power and provide irrigation water. The Vorotan Cascade consists of three hydroelectric power plants and five reservoirs with a combined installed capacity of 404.2 MW. It is one of the main power generation complexes in Armenia.

== History ==
The planning process of the Cascade began just after the Conference of the State Planning Commission held in 1951. In 1954, it was highlighted that with proper infrastructure and careful planning, Armenia's energetic hydro resources might allow it to become an electricity exporter to neighbouring energy deficit areas like Azerbaijan and Iran. It was anticipated that the activation of the Cascade would cut the import of oil products to the country by half. The design work of the Complex began in 1954 and it was constructed between 1961 and 1989. The Tatev hydroelectric power plant (HPP) was completed in December 1970, the Shamb HPP in 1978, and the Spandaryan HPP] in 1989. Despite the plans, Azerbaijan was against the import of electricity from Armenia, thus hindering the scheduled renovation and capacity expansion to take place at the end of the 1970s. The Vorotan Cascade continued to supply electricity mainly to non-ferrous metallurgy industry in nearby Agarak.

After Armenia gained independence, the Voratan Cascade belonged to the state-owned energy company Armenergo. In 1997, the Vorotan cascade was separated from Armenergo into a separate state owned company.

Modernization of the cascade started in 2003 by help of the €2.7 million grant of the European Union which was used for rehabilitation of the Tatev HPP of the Vorotan Cascade, and the Argel HPP. Rehabilitation works were conducted by Voith Siemens Hydro Power Generation. Next rehabilitation project was launched in 2010, financed by the €51 million credit from the German development bank KfW. Rehabilitation works started in 2012.

In 2015, ContourGlobal purchased the Vorotan Cascade operating company for US$180 million. ContourGlobal has started a six-year refurbishment program to modernize the plants and improve their operational performance, as well as safety, reliability, and efficiency, with the total investment of $70 million. This is the biggest investment US investment in Armenia. The International Finance Corporation, a member of the World Bank Group, did 20% of the total investment.

== Specifications ==
The Vorotan River has length of 178 kilometres (111 mi), the fall of 1,223 metres (4,012 ft), and the natural annual flow of 18.6 cubic metres per second (660 cu ft/s) for the link of Tatev. The source of the river is on 3,045 metres (9,990 ft) of the height and starts like a stream, accepting numerous ponds and streams.

The Vorotan Cascade includes a system of three power plants which are Spandaryan, Shamb and Tatev, and five reservoirs which are Spandaryan, Angeghakot, Tolors, Tatev and a daily regulation reservoir. The Spandaryan Reservoir in the vicinity of Tsghuk and Gorhayq villages, is the starting point of the complex. From there water flows through a pressurized tunnel to the Spandaryan HPP. From the Spandaryan HPP water flows to the Angeghakot Reservoir and continues its journey to the Tolors Reservoir which is located in the area of Sisian and Ayri. From that reservoir the water flows to the Shamb HPP. From Shamb reservoir that was constructed beyond the Shamb HPP water reaches the regulation pool, from where it proceeds to the Tatev HPP via a turbine pipe.

Power plants of the Vorotan Cascade
Power Plant	Year	Units	Installed Capacity (MW)	Coordinates
Spandaryan HPP	1989	2 X 38 MW	76	39°39′00″N 45°51′00″E
Shamb HPP	1978	2 X 85.5 MW	171	39°26′13″N 46°09′00″E
Tatev HPP	1970	3 x 52.4 MW	157.2	39°25′39″N 46°22′15″E
Total		7	404.2	

The Vorotan Cascade is one of the main power generation complexes in Armenia. It provides both peak and base load power. It is used also for the grid stabilization. The Tatev HPP has installed capacity of 157.2 MW, the Shamb HPP has installed capacity of 171 MW, and the Spandaryan HPP has installed capacity of 76 MW. Total installed capacity of Vorotan Cascade is 404.2 MW and it generates 1.16 GWh of electricity annually.

The water stores of the Vorotan Complex are also used for irrigation in nearby village and town areas.

== Power stations ==
=== Tatev HPP ===
The Tatev HPP is located near the Vorotan village on the left bank of the Vorotan River at the altitude of 730 metres (2,400 ft). It is one of Armenia's largest hydroelectric power plants, with installed capacity of 157.2 megawatts (210,800 hp) and annual generation of 670 GWh. Power is generated by three Pelton turbines of 52.4 megawatts (70,300 hp) each. The plant is unique has it is the highest-head hydroelectric power plant in the territory of the former Soviet Union and by using Pelton turbines.

The plant includes the Tatev Dam which is a 41-metre (135 ft) high and 107-metre (351 ft) embankment type dam of sandy gravel. It includes also the daily regulation reservoir. The dam creates the Tatev Reservoir.

The water intake on the left bank of the Vorotan River has capacity of 25 cubic metres per second (880 cu ft/s) and the spillway has total capacity of 312 cubic metres per second (11,000 cu ft/s). Water runs from the water intake through the 18-kilometre (11 mi) long free-flow diversion tunnel to the delivery chamber. The 139.4-metre (457 ft) long and 4-metre (13 ft) high tail-water canal is connected with an irrigation water outlet. The pressure chamber has a diameter of 20 metres (66 ft) and the threshold level of 1,293.05 metres (4,242.3 ft). It is connected to the plant by a 1,855-metre (6,086 ft) pressure conduit, and to the 80,000-cubic-metre (65 acre⋅ft) daily regulation reservoir by the sluice-feeder. The rated head of the plant is 568.8 metres (1,866 ft).

=== Shamb HPP ===
The Shamb HPP is located near the village of Shamb on the right bank of the Vorotan River at the altitude of 1,328 metres (4,357 ft). It is one of the largest hydroelectric power plant having an installed capacity of 171 megawatts (229,000 hp) and annual generation of 320 GWh.

Shamb HPP includes the Angeghakot and Tolors dams which create the Angeghakot and Tolors reservoirs. The Angeghakot Dam is a 23.4-metre (77 ft) high concrete spillway dam. The Tolors Dam is a 69-metre (226 ft) high and 188-metre (617 ft) long embankment type dam of sandy gravel and soil. The Angeghakot and Tolors reservoirs are connected by a 10.5-kilometre (6.5 mi) free-flow tunnel which has throughput capacity of 23 cubic metres per second (810 cu ft/s). Water runs from the Tolors Reservoir to the plant through a 6.9-kilometre (4.3 mi) diversion pressure tunnel which turns into a 1,260-metre (4,130 ft) single-lane penstock.

=== Spandaryan HPP ===
The Spandaryan HPP is located near Shaghat at the altitude of 1,694 metres (5,558 ft). It is the upper hydroelectric power plant on the cascade commissioned in 1989. The plant has an installed capacity of 76 MW and a projected annual electricity generation of 210 GWh.

The Spandaryan Dam creates the cascade's upper reservoir, the Spandaryan Reservoir. The 83-metre (272 ft) high and 315-metre (1,033 ft) long Spandaryan dam is an embankment type, mixed rockfill and earthfill with clayey soiled bottom.

Its water intake infrastructures includes a pressure tunnel, a spillway culvert, and the Vorotan–Arpa tunnel for releasing water into Lake Sevan. The structures have 30.5 cubic metres per second (1,080 cu ft/s), 80 cubic metres per second (2,800 cu ft/s) and 15 cubic metres per second (530 cu ft/s) water outlays respectively. The last, the fourth structure is a surface spillway with a 160 cubic metres per second (5,700 cu ft/s) installed capacity and inclining drop. The pressure tunnel is 8.2 kilometres (5.1 mi) long and it ends with a surge tank with capacity of 1,900 cubic metres (67,000 cu ft). The surge tank is connected to plant by 2,168-metre (7,113 ft) penstock.

== Reservoirs ==
=== Spandaryan Reservoir ===
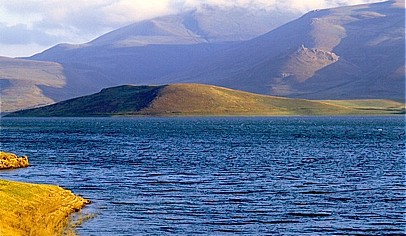
Spandaryan Reservoir

Spandaryan Reservoir is located southeast of Gorayk, in Spandaryan in the Vorotan River basin. It is connected to Arpa River and Arpa River basin by a 9-mile (14 km) long tunnel. It reportedly has a breeding colony of lesser kestrels, the only known in Armenia.

The reservoir's length is 7 kilometres (4.3 mi), its width varies from 2.5 to 3 kilometres (1.6 to 1.9 mi), and its depth is 73 metres (240 ft). The surface area of the reservoir is 10.8 square kilometres (4.2 sq mi). It has 218,000,000 cubic metres (177,000 acre⋅ft) active and 257,000,000 cubic metres (208,000 acre⋅ft) total capacities. The normal elevation of water level is 2,060 metres (6,760 ft) while 2,030 metres (6,660 ft) is the absolute minimum.

=== Angeghakot Reservoir ===
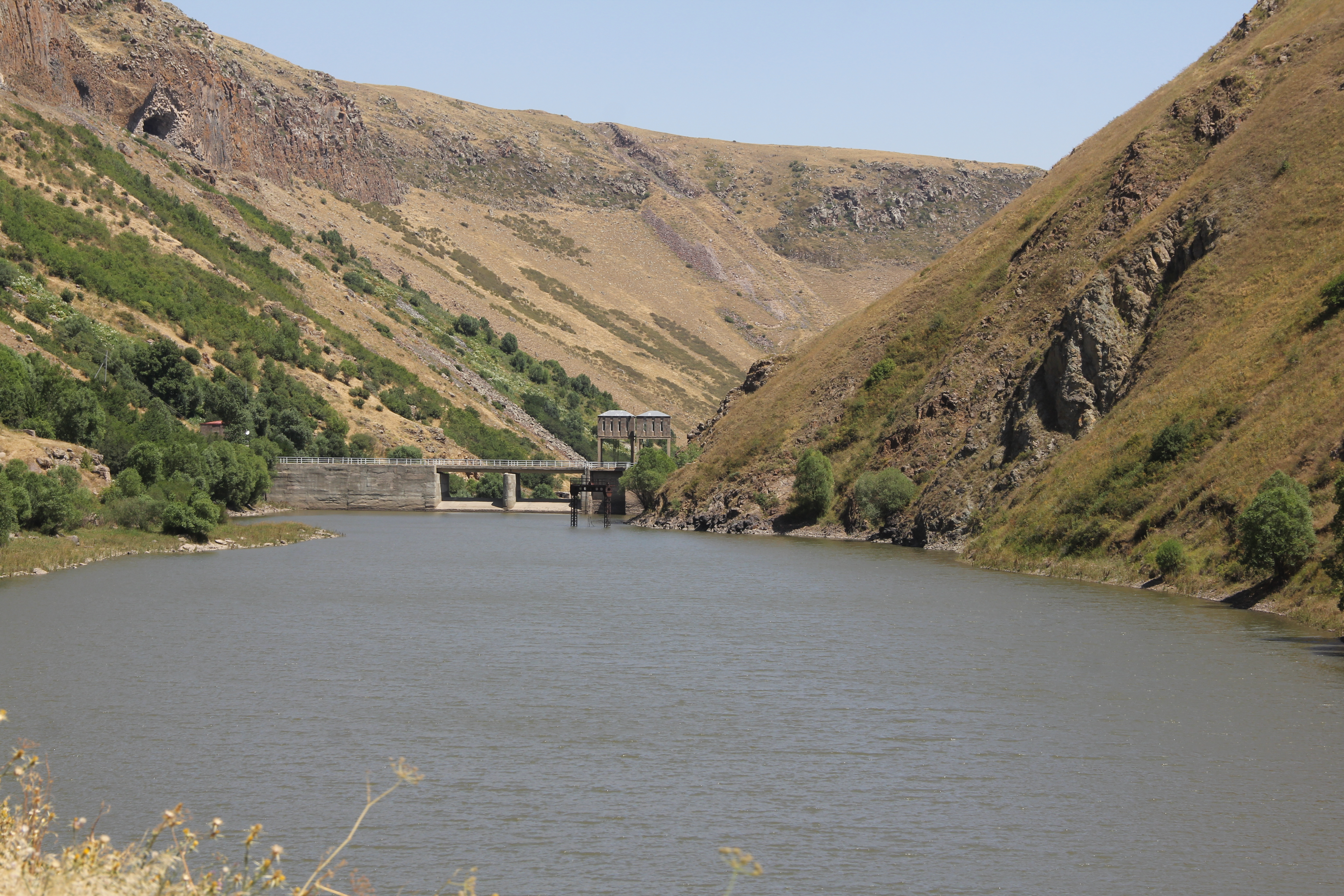
Angeghakot reservoir

The Angeghakot Reservoir has 3,400,000 cubic metres (2,800 acre⋅ft) of total capacity. The reservoir has throughput capacity of 500,000 cubic metres per second (18,000,000 cu ft/s) and the spillway has capacity of 198 cubic metres per second (7,000 cu ft/s).

=== Tolors reservoir ===
The Tolors Reservoir has a total capacity of 96,000,000 cubic metres (78,000 acre⋅ft) and active capacity of 80,000,000 cubic metres (65,000 acre⋅ft). The normal elevation of water level is 1,651.1 metres (5,417 ft) while 1,625.5 metres (5,333 ft) is the minimum.

=== Tatev Reservoir ===
The Tatev Reservoir has total capacity of 13,600,000 cubic metres (11,000 acre⋅ft) and active capacity of 1,800,000 cubic metres (1,500 acre⋅ft). The normal elevation of water level is 1,335.4 metres (4,381 ft) while 1,333.8 metres (4,376 ft) is the minimum.
