= Aq Bolagh-e Meydan =

Aq Bolagh-e Meydan اق بلاغ ميدان
- Village
- Location within Iran
- Coordinates: 39°08′01″N 44°26′14″E
- Country: Iran
- Province: West Azerbaijan
- County: Chaldoran
- Bakhsh: Central
- Rural District: Chaldoran-e Shomali

Population (2006)
  - Total: 31
- Time zone: UTC+3:30 (IRST)
  - Summer (DST): UTC+4:30 (IRDT)

Aq Bolagh-e Meydan (Persian: اق بلاغ ميدان, also Romanized as Āq Bolāgh-e Meydān and Āqbolāgh Meydān) is a village in Chaldoran-e Shomali Rural District, in the Central District of Chaldoran County, West Azerbaijan Province, Iran. At the 2006 census, its population was 31, in 11 families.
