= Ak-Bulak, Turkmenistan =

Human settlement in Turkmenistan

Coordinates: 37°31′N 66°20′E

Ak-Bulak is a locality in Turkmenistan.
