= Aghbolagh, Hashtrud =

Aghbolagh اغبلاغ
- Village
- Location within Iran
- Coordinates: 37°16′07″N 46°49′05″E
- Country: Iran
- Province: East Azerbaijan
- County: Hashtrud
- Bakhsh: Nazarkahrizi
- Rural District: Nazarkahrizi

Population (2006)
  - Total: 153
- Time zone: UTC+3:30 (IRST)
  - Summer (DST): UTC+4:30 (IRDT)

Aghbolagh (Persian: اغبلاغ, also Romanized as Āghbolāgh; also known as Āqbolāgh) is a village in Nazarkahrizi Rural District, Nazarkahrizi District, Hashtrud County, East Azerbaijan Province, Iran. At the 2006 census, its population was 153, in 28 families.
