= Aqbolagh, East Azerbaijan =

Aqbolagh اق بلاغ
- Village
- Location within Iran
- Coordinates: 38°36′35″N 47°19′53″E
- Country: Iran
- Province: East Azerbaijan
- County: Ahar
- Bakhsh: Central
- Rural District: Vargahan

Population (2006)
  - Total: 72
- Time zone: UTC+3:30 (IRST)
  - Summer (DST): UTC+4:30 (IRDT)

Aqbolagh (Persian: اق بلاغ, romanized: Āqbolāgh; also known as Āgh Bolāgh) is a village in Vargahan Rural District, in the Central District of Ahar County, East Azerbaijan Province, Iran. At the 2006 census, its population was 72, in 12 families.
