= Aghbolagh, Bostanabad =

Aghbolagh اغبلاغ
- Village
- Location within Iran
- Coordinates: 37°54′00″N 47°49′52″E
- Country: Iran
- Province: East Azerbaijan
- County: Bostanabad
- Bakhsh: Central
- Rural District: Mehranrud-e Jonubi

Population (2006)
  - Total: 393
- Time zone: UTC+3:30 (IRST)
  - Summer (DST): UTC+4:30 (IRDT)

Aghbolagh (Persian: اغبلاغ, also Romanized as Āghbolāgh and Āgh Bolāgh) is a village in Mehranrud-e Jonubi Rural District, in the Central District of Bostanabad County, East Azerbaijan Province, Iran. At the 2006 census, its population was 393, in 72 families.
