= Aghbolagh-e Hamadani =

Aghbolagh-e Hamadani اغبلاغ همداني
- Village
- Location within Iran
- Coordinates: 36°30′29″N 47°12′48″E
- Country: Iran
- Province: West Azerbaijan
- County: Takab
- Bakhsh: Takht-e Soleyman
- Rural District: Chaman

Population (2006)
  - Total: 119
- Time zone: UTC+3:30 (IRST)
  - Summer (DST): UTC+4:30 (IRDT)

Aghbolagh-e Hamadani (Persian: اغبلاغ همداني, also Romanized as Āghbolāgh-e Hamadānī; also known as Āqbolāgh-e Hamadān and Āqbolāgh-e Hamedānī) is a village in Chaman Rural District, Takht-e Soleyman District, Takab County, West Azerbaijan Province, Iran. At the 2006 census, its population was 119, in 24 families.
