= Aqbolagh-e Bahman =

Aqbolagh-e Bahman اقبلاغ بهمن
- Village
- Location within Iran
- Coordinates: 37°50′26″N 47°45′00″E
- Country: Iran
- Province: East Azerbaijan
- County: Sarab
- Bakhsh: Central
- Rural District: Molla Yaqub

Population (2006)
  - Total: 86
- Time zone: UTC+3:30 (IRST)
  - Summer (DST): UTC+4:30 (IRDT)

Aqbolagh-e Bahman (Persian: اقبلاغ بهمن, also Romanized as Āqbolāgh-e Bahman; also known as Āq Bolāgh) is a village in Molla Yaqub Rural District, in the Central District of Sarab County, East Azerbaijan Province, Iran. At the 2006 census, its population was 86, in 14 families.
