= Aghberk =

Village in Gegharkunik, Armenia

Aghberk Աղբերք
- Location within Armenia Location within Gegharkunik
- Coordinates: 40°31′45″N 45°16′53″E
- Country: Armenia
- Province: Gegharkunik
- Municipality: Shoghakat
- Elevation: 2,055 m (6,742 ft)

Population (2011)
  - Total: 278
- Time zone: UTC+4 (AMT)
- Postal code: 1305

Aghberk (Armenian: Աղբերք) is a village in the Shoghakat Municipality of the Gegharkunik Province of Armenia. The village was populated by Azerbaijanis, who called it Ağbulaq, before the exodus of Azerbaijanis from Armenia after the outbreak of the Nagorno-Karabakh conflict. In 1988-1989 Armenian refugees from Azerbaijan settled in the village.
