= Msmna, Nagorno-Karabakh =

Msmna / Aghbulag Մսմնա / Ağbulaq
- Location within Azerbaijan
- Coordinates: 39°44′41″N 46°54′52″E
- Country: Azerbaijan
  - District: Khojavend

Population (2015)
  - Total: 100
- Time zone: UTC+4 (AZT)

Msmna (Armenian: Մսմնա) or Aghbulag (Azerbaijani: Ağbulaq) is a village located in the Khojavend District of Azerbaijan, in the region of Nagorno-Karabakh. Until 2023 it was controlled by the breakaway Republic of Artsakh. The village had an ethnic Armenian-majority population until the expulsion of the Armenian population of Nagorno-Karabakh by Azerbaijan following the 2023 Azerbaijani offensive in Nagorno-Karabakh.

== History ==
During the Soviet period, the village was part of the Martuni District of the Nagorno-Karabakh Autonomous Oblast.

== Historical heritage sites ==
Historical heritage sites in and around the village include the 18th-century monastery of Shoshkavank (Armenian: Շոշկավանք), and the 19th-century church of Surb Astvatsatsin (Armenian: Սուրբ Աստվածածին, lit. 'Holy Mother of God').

== Economy and culture ==
The population is mainly engaged in agriculture and animal husbandry. As of 2015, the village has a municipal building, a house of culture, the Msmna branch of the Kolkhozashen Secondary School, and a medical centre.

== Demographics ==
The village has an ethnic Armenian-majority population, had 71 inhabitants in 2005, and 100 inhabitants in 2015.
