= Aghbolagh-e Hashtrud =

Aghbolagh-e Hashtrud اغبلاغ هشترود
- Village
- Location within Iran
- Coordinates: 37°15′10″N 46°42′23″E
- Country: Iran
- Province: East Azerbaijan
- County: Hashtrud
- Bakhsh: Nazarkahrizi
- Rural District: Nazarkahrizi

Population (2006)
  - Total: 118
- Time zone: UTC+3:30 (IRST)
  - Summer (DST): UTC+4:30 (IRDT)

Aghbolagh-e Hashtrud (Persian: اغبلاغ هشترود, also Romanized as Āghbolāgh-e Hashtrūd; also known as Āq Bolāgh and Āqbolāgh-e Hashtrūd) is a village in Nazarkahrizi Rural District, Nazarkahrizi District, Hashtrud County, East Azerbaijan Province, Iran. At the 2006 census, its population was 118, in 27 families.
