= Albolagh, Bukan =

Albolagh البلاغ
- Village
- Location within Iran
- Coordinates: 36°30′12″N 46°16′57″E
- Country: Iran
- Province: West Azerbaijan
- County: Bukan
- Bakhsh: Central
- Rural District: Behi-e Feyzolah Beygi

Population (2006)
  - Total: 470
- Time zone: UTC+3:30 (IRST)
  - Summer (DST): UTC+4:30 (IRDT)

Albolagh (Persian: البلاغ, also Romanized as Ālbolāgh and Āl Bolāgh) is a village in Behi-e Feyzolah Beygi Rural District, in the Central District of Bukan County, West Azerbaijan Province, Iran. At the 2006 census, its population was 470, in 88 families.
