= Aghbolagh-e Hasan Kandi =

Aghbolagh-e Hasan Kandi اغبلاغ حسن‌کندی
- Village
- Location within Iran
- Coordinates: 37°27′46″N 47°15′38″E
- Country: Iran
- Province: East Azerbaijan
- County: Hashtrud
- Bakhsh: Central
- Rural District: Aliabad

Population (2006)
  - Total: 144
- Time zone: UTC+3:30 (IRST)
  - Summer (DST): UTC+4:30 (IRDT)

Aghbolagh-e Hasan Kandi (Persian: اغبلاغ حسن‌کندی, also Romanized as Āghbolāgh-e Ḩasan Kandī; also known as Āghbolāgh, Āq Bolāgh, and Āqbolāgh-e Ḩasan Kandī) is a village in Aliabad Rural District, in the Central District of Hashtrud County, East Azerbaijan Province, Iran. At the 2006 census, its population was 144, in 25 families.
