= Agh Bolagh, Miandoab =

Agh Bolagh اغبلاغ
- Village
- Location within Iran
- Coordinates: 36°58′24″N 46°35′45″E
- Country: Iran
- Province: West Azerbaijan
- County: Miandoab
- Bakhsh: Baruq
- Rural District: Ajorluy-ye Gharbi

Population (2006)
  - Total: 178
- Time zone: UTC+3:30 (IRST)
  - Summer (DST): UTC+4:30 (IRDT)

Agh Bolagh (Persian: اغبلاغ, also Romanized as Āgh Bolāgh; also known as Āq Bolāgh) is a village in Ajorluy-ye Gharbi Rural District, Baruq District, Miandoab County, West Azerbaijan Province, Iran. At the 2006 census, its population was 178, in 37 families.
