= Vanand, Syunik =

Vanand Վանանդ
- Location within Armenia Location within Syunik Province
- Coordinates: 39°20′34″N 46°26′02″E
- Country: Armenia
- Province: Syunik
- Municipality: Goris

Population (2011)
  - Total: 0
- Time zone: UTC+4 (AMT)

Vanand (Armenian: Վանանդ) is an abandoned village in the Goris Municipality of Syunik Province, Armenia. It is listed as unpopulated at the 2011 census.
