= Aghbolagh, Varzaqan =

Aghbolagh اغبلاغ
- Village
- Location within Iran
- Coordinates: 38°30′35″N 46°25′15″E
- Country: Iran
- Province: East Azerbaijan
- County: Varzaqan
- Bakhsh: Central
- Rural District: Sina

Population (2006)
  - Total: 125
- Time zone: UTC+3:30 (IRST)
  - Summer (DST): UTC+4:30 (IRDT)

Aghbolagh (Persian: اغبلاغ, also Romanized as Āghbloāgh and Agh Bolagh; also known as Agbulag, Āgh Bolāgh-e ‘Olyā, Āqbolāgh, Āq Bolāgh, Āq Bolāgh-e Bālā, Āqbolāgh-e ‘Olyā, Āq Bulāgh, and Bāgh Bolāgh-e Bālā) is a village in Sina Rural District, in the Central District of Varzaqan County, East Azerbaijan Province, Iran. At the 2006 census, its population was 125, in 28 families.
