= Aghbolagh-e Hoseyn Khan =

Aghbolagh-e Hoseyn Khan آغبلاغ حسين خان
- Village
- Location within Iran
- Coordinates: 36°06′50″N 47°47′36″E
- Country: Iran
- Province: Kurdistan
- County: Bijar
- Bakhsh: Central
- Rural District: Seylatan

Population (2006)
  - Total: 123
- Time zone: UTC+3:30 (IRST)
  - Summer (DST): UTC+4:30 (IRDT)

Aghbolagh-e Hoseyn Khan (Persian: آغبلاغ حسين خان, also Romanized as Āghbolāgh-e Ḩoseyn Khān; also known as Āqbolāgh-e Ḩoseyn Khān) is a village in Seylatan Rural District, in the Central District of Bijar County, Kurdistan province, Iran. At the 2006 census, its population was 123, in 29 families. The village is populated by Azerbaijanis with a Kurdish minority.
