= Aghbolagh-e Chamanlu =

Aghbolagh-e Chamanlu اغبلاغ چمنلو
- Village
- Location within Iran
- Coordinates: 39°11′35″N 44°35′44″E
- Country: Iran
- Province: West Azerbaijan
- County: Maku
- Bakhsh: Central
- Rural District: Qaleh Darrehsi

Population (2006)
  - Total: 126
- Time zone: UTC+3:30 (IRST)
  - Summer (DST): UTC+4:30 (IRDT)

Aghbolagh-e Chamanlu (Persian: اغبلاغ چمنلو, also Romanized as Āghbolāgh-e Chamanlū) is a village in Qaleh Darrehsi Rural District, in the Central District of Maku County, West Azerbaijan Province, Iran. At the 2006 census, its population was 126, in 28 families.
