= Aq Bolagh, Asadabad =

Aq Bolagh اق بلاغ
- Village
- Location within Iran
- Coordinates: 34°54′43″N 48°01′35″E
- Country: Iran
- Province: Hamadan
- County: Asadabad
- Bakhsh: Central
- Rural District: Chaharduli

Population (2006)
  - Total: 111
- Time zone: UTC+3:30 (IRST)
  - Summer (DST): UTC+4:30 (IRDT)

Aq Bolagh (Persian: اق بلاغ, also Romanized as Āq Bolāgh) is a village in Chaharduli Rural District, in the Central District of Asadabad County, Hamadan Province, Iran. At the 2006 census, its population was 111, in 22 families.
