= Aghbolagh-e Alamdar =

Aghbolagh-e Alamdar اغبلاغ علمدار
- Village
- Location within Iran
- Coordinates: 37°17′43″N 46°19′49″E
- Country: Iran
- Province: East Azerbaijan
- County: Maragheh
- Bakhsh: Central
- Rural District: Sarajuy-ye Shomali

Population (2006)
  - Total: 33
- Time zone: UTC+3:30 (IRST)
  - Summer (DST): UTC+4:30 (IRDT)

Aghbolagh-e Alamdar (Persian: اغبلاغ علمدار, also Romanized as Āghbolāgh-e ‘Alamdār; also known as Āqbolāgh-e ‘Alamdār, Dāsh Āqbolāgh, and Dāsh Āqbolāghī) is a village in Sarajuy-ye Shomali Rural District, in the Central District of Maragheh County, East Azerbaijan Province, Iran. At the 2006 census, its population was 33, in 11 families.
