= Agh Bolagh, Ardabil =

Agh Bolagh
- Location in Iran
- Coordinates: 38.870°N 47.949°E
- Country: Iran
- Province: Ardabil Province
- Time zone: UTC+3:30 (IRST)
  - Summer (DST): UTC+4:30 (IRDT)

Agh Bolagh is a village in the Ardabil Province of Iran.
