= Aghbolagh-e Olya, West Azerbaijan =

Village in West Azerbaijan province, Iran

Aghbolagh-e Olya Persian: اغبلاغ عليا
- Village
- Location within Iran
- Coordinates: 36°35′01″N 47°16′42″E
- Country: Iran
- Province: West Azerbaijan
- County: Takab
- District: Takht-e Soleyman
- Rural District: Chaman

Population (2016)
  - Total: 212
- Time zone: UTC+3:30 (IRST)

Aghbolagh-e Olya (Persian: اغبلاغ عليا) (Note: Also romanized as Āghbolāgh-e ‘Olyā; also known as Āgh Bolāgh, Akbulāgh, Āq Bolāgh, Aq Bulāq, and Āqbolāgh-e ‘Olyā) is a village in Chaman Rural District of Takht-e Soleyman District in Takab County, West Azerbaijan province, Iran.

== Demographics ==
=== Population ===
At the time of the 2006 National Census, the village's population was 320 in 72 households. The following census in 2011 counted 282 people in 69 households. The 2016 census measured the population of the village as 212 people in 75 households.
