= Ağbulaq, Jalilabad =

Ağbulaq
- Municipality
- Location within Azerbaijan
- Coordinates: 39°05′N 48°26′E
- Country: Azerbaijan
- Rayon: Jalilabad

Population
  - Total: 77
- Time zone: UTC+4 (AZT)

Ağbulaq (also, Agbulak and Akh-Bulakh) is a village and the least populous municipality in the Jalilabad Rayon of Azerbaijan. It has a population of 77.
