= Ağbulaq, Khojavend =

Aghbulag / Aknaghbyur Ağbulaq / Ակնաղբյուր
- Location within Azerbaijan Location within Karabakh Economic Region
- Coordinates: 39°33′17″N 47°04′59″E
- Country: Azerbaijan
- District: Khojavend

Population (2015)
  - Total: 322
- Time zone: UTC+4 (AZT)

Aghbulag (Azerbaijani: Ağbulaq) or Aknaghbyur (Armenian: Ակնաղբյուր) is a village in the Khojavend District of Azerbaijan, in the region of Nagorno-Karabakh.

== History ==
During the Soviet period, the village was part of the Hadrut District of the Nagorno-Karabakh Autonomous Oblast. After the First Nagorno-Karabakh War, the village was administered as part of the Hadrut Province of the Republic of Artsakh. The village was captured by Azerbaijan during the 2020 Nagorno-Karabakh war.

== Historical heritage sites ==
Historical heritage sites in and around the village include an 18th/19th-century cemetery, and the 19th-century church of Surb Astvatsatsin (Armenian: Սուրբ Աստվածածին, lit. 'Holy Mother of God').

== Demographics ==
The village had an ethnic Armenian-majority population in 1989. Prior to the 2020 Nagorno-Karabakh war, it also had an Armenian majority with 330 inhabitants in 2005, and 322 inhabitants in 2015.
