= Aghbolagh-e Sofla, Maragheh =

Aghbolagh-e Sofla اغبلاغ سفلي
- Village
- Location within Iran
- Coordinates: 37°10′40″N 46°31′36″E
- Country: Iran
- Province: East Azerbaijan
- County: Maragheh
- Bakhsh: Saraju
- Rural District: Quri Chay-ye Gharbi

Population (2006)
  - Total: 139
- Time zone: UTC+3:30 (IRST)
  - Summer (DST): UTC+4:30 (IRDT)

Aghbolagh-e Sofla (Persian: اغبلاغ سفلي, also Romanized as Āghbolāgh-e Soflá; also known as Āqbolāgh-e Soflá) is a village in Quri Chay-ye Gharbi Rural District, Saraju District, Maragheh County, East Azerbaijan Province, Iran. At the 2006 census, its population was 139, in 28 families.
