= Ağbulaq, Ismailli =

Ağbulaq
- Municipality
- Location within Azerbaijan
- Coordinates: 40°42′35″N 48°13′17″E
- Country: Azerbaijan
- Rayon: Ismailli

Population
  - Total: 372
- Time zone: UTC+4 (AZT)
  - Summer (DST): UTC+5 (AZT)

Ağbulaq (also, Ag-Bulag and Agbulak) is a village and municipality in the Ismailli Rayon of Azerbaijan. It has a population of 372.
