= Aq Bolagh, Qorveh =

Aq Bolagh آقبلاغ
- Village
- Location within Iran
- Coordinates: 35°01′51″N 48°09′46″E
- Country: Iran
- Province: Kurdistan
- County: Qorveh
- Bakhsh: Chaharduli
- Rural District: Chaharduli-ye Sharqi

Population (2006)
  - Total: 486
- Time zone: UTC+3:30 (IRST)
  - Summer (DST): UTC+4:30 (IRDT)

Aq Bolagh (Persian: آقبلاغ, also Romanized as Āq Bolāgh; also known as Āqbolāq and Āq Bulāq) is a village in Chaharduli-ye Sharqi Rural District, Chaharduli District, Qorveh County, Kurdistan Province, Iran. At the 2006 census, its population was 486, in 117 families. The village is populated by Azerbaijanis.
