= Aq Bolaq-e Mohammad Hoseyn Khan =

Aq Bolaq-e Mohammad Hoseyn Khan اق بلاق محمدحسين خان
- Village
- Location within Iran
- Coordinates: 33°48′36″N 49°02′59″E
- Country: Iran
- Province: Markazi
- County: Shazand
- Bakhsh: Sarband
- Rural District: Malmir

Population (2006)
  - Total: 181
- Time zone: UTC+3:30 (IRST)
  - Summer (DST): UTC+4:30 (IRDT)

Aq Bolaq-e Mohammad Hoseyn Khan (Persian: اق بلاق محمدحسين خان, also Romanized as Āq Bolāq-e Moḩammad Ḩoseyn Khān; also known as Āqbolāgh, Āq Bolāgh, Āq Bolāgh-e Moḩammad Ḩoseyn Khān, and Āq Bulāq) is a village in Malmir Rural District, Sarband District, Shazand County, Markazi Province, Iran. At the 2006 census, its population was 181, in 50 families.
