= Aghbulagh =

Aghbulagh Աղբուլլաղ
- village
- Location within Armenia Location within Syunik Province
- Coordinates: 39°21′04″N 46°23′54″E
- Country: Armenia
- Province: Syunik
- Municipality: Goris

Population (2011)
  - Total: 0
- Time zone: UTC+4

Aghbulagh (Armenian: Աղբուլլաղ), is an abandoned village in the Goris Municipality of Syunik Province, Armenia. It is listed as unpopulated at the 2011 census.
