= Ağbulaq, Lachin =

Ağbulaq
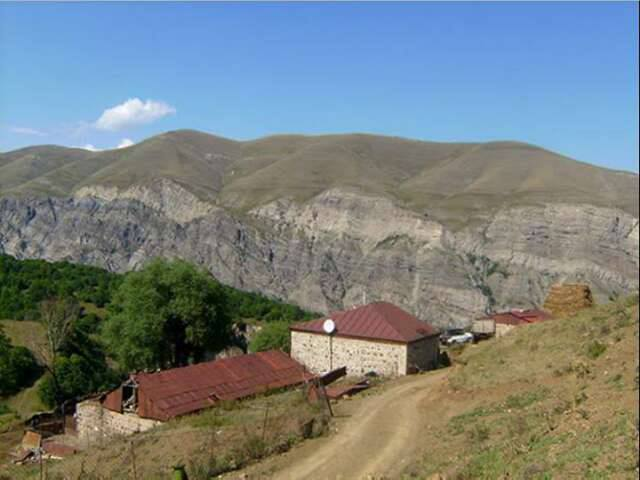

- Location within Azerbaijan Location within East Zangezur Economic Region
- Coordinates: 39°46′43″N 46°15′35″E
- Country: Azerbaijan
- District: Lachin
- Elevation: 1,969 m (6,460 ft)

Population (2015)
  - Total: 45
- Time zone: UTC+4 (AZT)

Ağbulaq (Aghbulag; Kurdish: Aqbûlax) or Spitakajur (Armenian: Սպիտակաջուր) is a village in the Lachin District of Azerbaijan. Historically, the village had a Kurdish population.

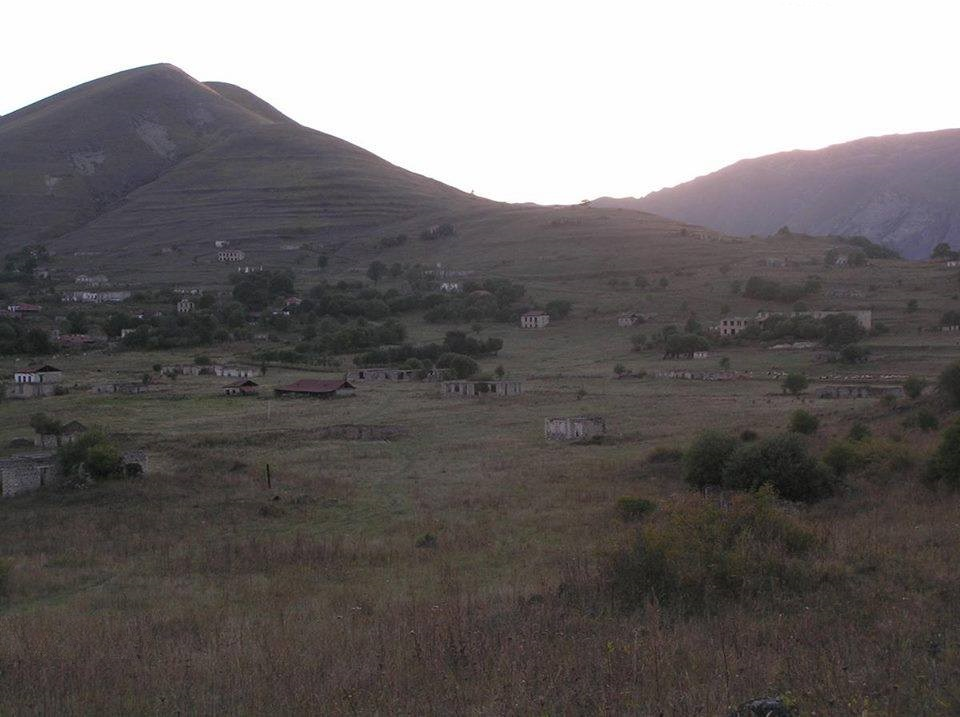
Ağbulaq village, Lachin, Azerbaijan

== History ==
Formerly part of Red Kurdistan and later the Kurdistan Okrug, the village was located in the Armenian-occupied territories surrounding Nagorno-Karabakh, coming under the control of ethnic Armenian forces in 1992 during the First Nagorno-Karabakh War. The village subsequently became part of the breakaway Republic of Artsakh as part of its Kashatagh Province, referred to as Spitakajur (Armenian: Սպիտակաջուր). It was returned to Azerbaijan as part of the 2020 Nagorno-Karabakh ceasefire agreement.
