= Aqbolagh-e Sadat =

Aqbolagh-e Sadat اقبلاغ سادات
- Village
- Location within Iran
- Coordinates: 33°51′38″N 49°11′55″E
- Country: Iran
- Province: Markazi
- County: Shazand
- Bakhsh: Sarband
- Rural District: Hendudar

Population (2006)
  - Total: 283
- Time zone: UTC+3:30 (IRST)
  - Summer (DST): UTC+4:30 (IRDT)

Aqbolagh-e Sadat (Persian: اقبلاغ سادات, also Romanized as Āqbolāgh-e Sādāt; also known as Aqjah Bulāq and Āqjeh Bolāgh) is a village in Hendudar Rural District, Sarband District, Shazand County, Markazi Province, Iran. At the 2006 census, its population was 283, in 63 families.
