= Aq Bolagh, Dehgolan =

Aq Bolagh آقبلا
- Village
- Location within Iran
- Coordinates: 35°21′48″N 47°10′39″E
- Country: Iran
- Province: Kurdistan
- County: Dehgolan
- Bakhsh: Central
- Rural District: Quri Chay

Population (2006)
  - Total: 67
- Time zone: UTC+3:30 (IRST)
  - Summer (DST): UTC+4:30 (IRDT)

Aq Bolagh (Persian: آقبلاغ, also Romanized as Āq Bolāgh; also known as Ālbolāgh, Āl Bolāgh, Al Bulāq, Āqbolāq, and Bowlāgh) is a village in Quri Chay Rural District, in the Central District of Dehgolan County, Kurdistan Province, Iran. At the 2006 census, its population was 67, in 15 families. The village is populated by Kurds.
