= Vorotan =

Vorotan Որոտան
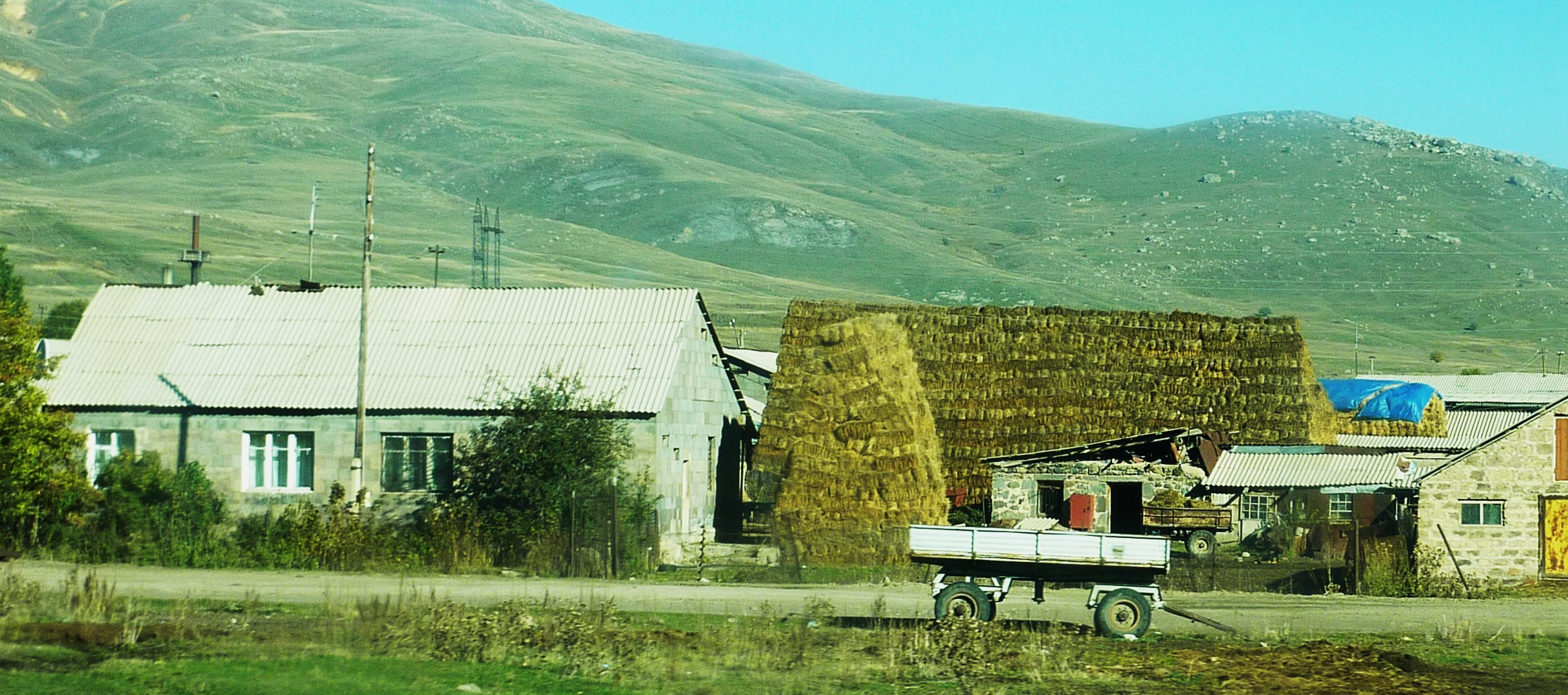

- Location within Armenia Location within Syunik Province
- Coordinates: 39°25′17″N 46°22′31″E
- Country: Armenia
- Province: Syunik
- Municipality: Goris

Area
  - Total: 0.31 km^{2} (0.12 sq mi)

Population (2011)
  - Total: 309
  - Density: 1,000/km^{2} (2,600/sq mi)
- Time zone: UTC+4 (AMT)

Vorotan (Armenian: Որոտան) is a village in the Goris Municipality of the Syunik Province in Armenia.

== Demographics ==
The Statistical Committee of Armenia reported its population was 307 in 2010, up from 271 at the 2001 census.
