= Aq Bolagh, Kowleh =

Alolakh ئاڵۆڵاخ‌=کانی‌چەرمۆ ئاڵۆڵاخ
- Village
- Location within Iran
- Coordinates: 35°42′31″N 47°08′17″E
- Country: Iran
- Province: Kurdistan
- County: Divandarreh
- Bakhsh: Saral
- Rural District: Kowleh

Population (2006)
  - Total: 162
- Time zone: UTC+3:30 (IRST)
  - Summer (DST): UTC+4:30 (IRDT)

Aq Bolagh (Persian: آق بلاغ, also Romanized as Āq Bolāgh and Āqbolāgh; also known as Al Bolāgh, Al Bulāq, and Āqbolāq) is a village in Kowleh Rural District, Saral District, Divandarreh County, Kurdistan Province, Iran. At the 2006 census, its population was 162, in 41 families. The village is populated by Kurds.
