= Aq Bolagh-e Morshed =

Village in Hamadan province, Iran

Aq Bolagh-e Morshed Persian: اقبلاغ مرشد
- Village
- Location within Iran
- Coordinates: 35°37′04″N 48°01′47″E
- Country: Iran
- Province: Hamadan
- County: Kabudarahang
- District: Gol Tappeh
- Rural District: Mehraban-e Sofla

Population (2016)
  - Total: 453
- Time zone: UTC+3:30 (IRST)

Aq Bolagh-e Morshed (Persian: اقبلاغ مرشد) (Note: Also romanized as Āq Bolāgh-e Morshed; also known as Āgh Bolāgh-e Morshed and Āq Bulāq Murshīd) is a village in Mehraban-e Sofla Rural District of Gol Tappeh District in Kabudarahang County, Hamadan province, Iran.

== Demographics ==
=== Population ===
At the time of the 2006 National Census, the village's population was 607 in 125 households. The following census in 2011 counted 468 people in 123 households. The 2016 census measured the population of the village as 453 people in 143 households.
