= Ağbulaq, Tovuz =

Ağbulaq
- Municipality
- Location within Azerbaijan
- Coordinates: 40°49′19″N 45°36′03″E
- Country: Azerbaijan
- Rayon: Tovuz

Population
  - Total: 266
- Time zone: UTC+4 (AZT)
  - Summer (DST): UTC+5 (AZT)

Ağbulaq (also, Agbulak) is a village and municipality in the Tovuz Rayon of Azerbaijan. It has a population of 266.
