= Human rights in Qatar =

Qatar is an authoritarian and de facto absolute monarchy under the House of Thani. Qatari law does not permit the establishment of political bodies or trade unions. Awareness of human rights abuses in Qatar grew internationally after Qatar's controversial selection to stage the 2022 FIFA World Cup. Human Rights Watch reported in 2026 that migrant workers, which make up over 91 percent of the country's population, "continue to face widespread abuse under the country’s restrictive kafala system". Women and girls in Qatar are still subject to extensive legal and social discrimination under a male guardianship system.

Domestic servants, who are often women from poorer African, South, and Southeast Asian countries, have little to no rights and often become victims of human and sex trafficking, including into prostitution. Individual rights and civil liberties in general are also highly restrictive in Qatar, such as the freedom of association, freedom of expression, and freedom of the press. In addition, sodomy laws exist for both males and females, but are mostly used to punish members of the LGBTQ community. Qatar's legal system is a mixture of civil law and Islamic law (Sharia). Flogging and capital punishment are also enforced.

== Legal system and punishment ==
According to Qatar's constitution, Sharia is a main source of Qatari legislation. Sharia is applied to statutes pertaining to family law, inheritance, and several criminal acts (including adultery, robbery and murder). In some cases in Sharia-based family courts a woman's testimony is worth half a man's, and in some cases a female and male testimony is not accepted at all if the witness is not deemed reliable. Codified family law was introduced in 2006. In 2002, a government-appointed organisation—the National Human Rights Committee—was established to supposedly investigate abuses. In practice, Qatar's legal system is a mixture of civil law and Islamic law.

=== Corporal punishment ===
In 2022, the Qatar delegation to the OHCHR claimed that flogging sentences have never been used in Qatar, but later also stated that "Flogging of minors was prohibited; that punishment was only applied to adults". Amnesty International reports unnamed "foreign nationals" being given flogging sentences as a punishment for alcohol consumption or illicit sexual relations. The US Department of State reported that in 2019 there were 375 cases of flogging as a punishment. In April 2013, a Muslim expatriate was sentenced to 40 lashes for alcohol consumption. In June 2014, another Muslim expatriate was sentenced to 40 lashes for consuming alcohol and driving under the influence. Muslims convicted of zina (unlawful sexual intercourse such as adultery and bestiality) can be sentenced to flogging.

=== Capital punishment ===
Qatar has the death penalty, primarily for espionage or other threats against national security. Apostasy, same-sex intercourse, and blasphemy are considered capital offences. There have been no recorded applications of the death penalty for blasphemy.

Others crimes, like murder, violent robbery resulting in death, arson, torture, kidnapping, terrorism, rape, drug trafficking, extortion by threat of accusation of a crime of honor, perjury causing wrongful execution, and treason carry a possible death sentence.

Stoning is no longer a legal punishment in Qatar, and has never been used. Apostasy is a crime punishable by the death penalty in Qatar. Homosexuality is a crime punishable in sharia by the death penalty for Muslims, though in Qatar the penalty for consenting males is up to 5 years in prison.

Capital punishment in Qatar is done by a firing squad. Executions are rare. The last execution occurred in May 2020, after a 17-year hiatus. The person executed was a murderer from Nepal.

== Labour ==
In 2026, both Human Rights Watch and Amnesty International have determined that foreign labourers in Qatar still faced widespread abuses under a "restrictive" and "exploitative" Kafala system. Human Rights Watch's report said that reforms have had "limited impact", and that the country has failed to address serious violations against workers, who still "face wage theft, unexplained deaths, dangerous working conditions and continued exploitation".

=== Background ===
==== The foreign worker population ====
As of 2025, foreign workers make up around 91% of Qatar's population, and constitute around 95% of its labour force. Naturalizations are "almost non-existent" in Qatar, and foreign workers are meant to stay only for the duration of their work, leading the International Labour Organization to claim that Qatar does not consider this population as "migrant workers", but rather as "guests" or "non-Qataris".

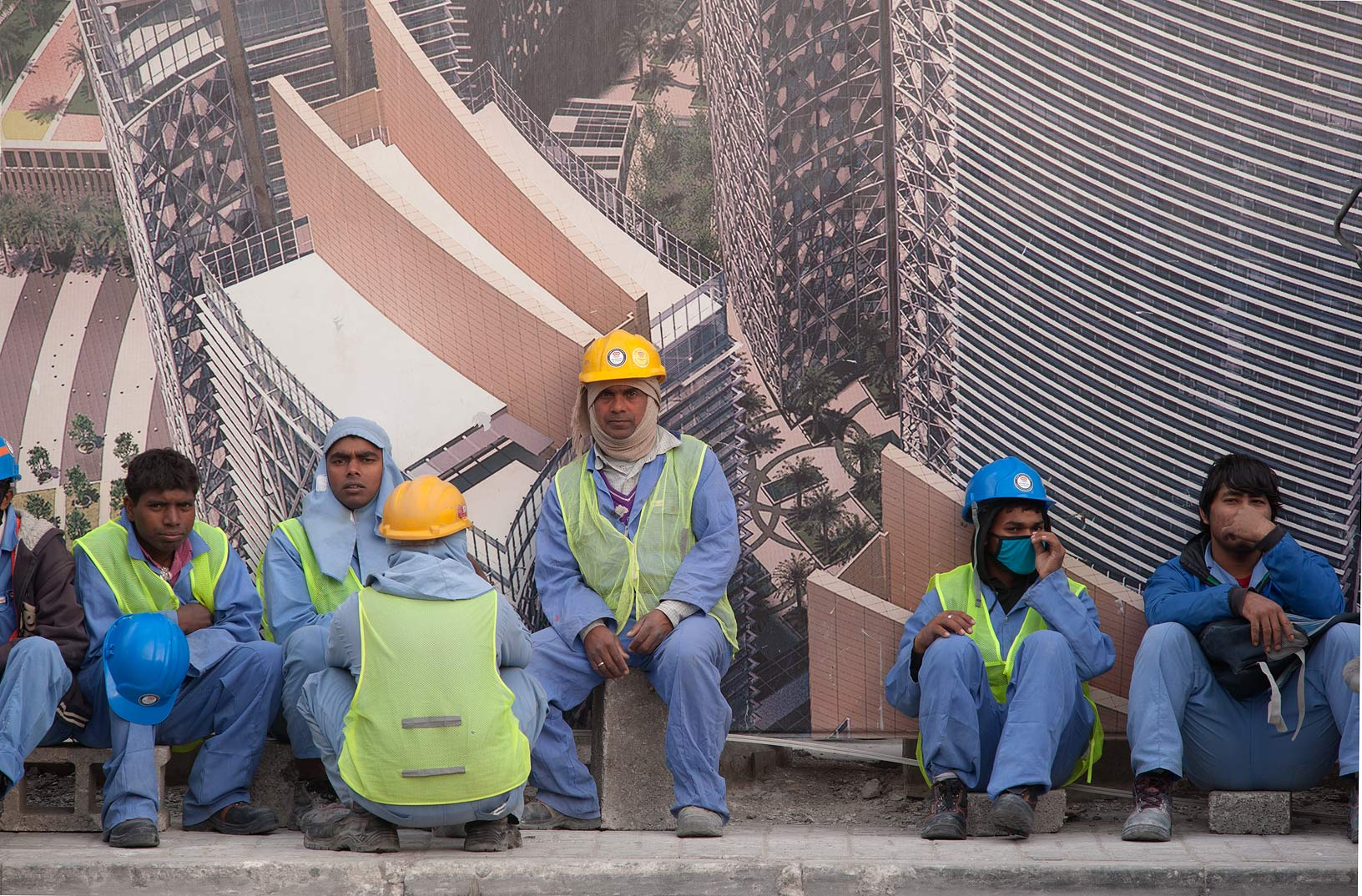
Migrant construction workers from South Asia in the West Bay area of Doha

According to a report from 2017, the combined number of South Asians (from the countries of the Indian subcontinent including Sri Lanka) represented over 1.5 million people (60%). Among these, Indians were the largest community, numbering 650,000 in 2017, followed by 350,000 Nepalese, 280,000 Bangladeshis, 145,000 Sri Lankans, and 125,000 Pakistanis.

The contingent of expatriates who were not of South Asian origin represented around 28% of Qatar's population. The largest group within this category was Filipinos (260,000) and Egyptians (200,000), alongside communities from Arab countries, Europe and elsewhere.

Of the foreign migrant population, a study from 2019 has found that over half have strong depression-like symptoms.

==== Kafala system ====
Foreign labourers in Qatar, as well as in other Gulf Arab states, are subjected to the Kafala system, leaving them vulnerable to exploitation. Under this system, the private company or individual sponsors their employees recruited from abroad in a scheme which grants them complete control over the worker's decision to transfer jobs as well their permissions to exit or re-enter the country. Workers also face difficulties in reporting contractual disputes and labour violations to relevant authorities as a result of this system. Additionally, the confiscation of an employee's personal possessions such as their passport and personal phone is a common practice, which limits their freedom of movement.

In 2021 the Foreign Ministry issued guidance for citizens travelling abroad with servants, nannies or drivers.

=== Human rights of foreign labourers ===
==== Before 2010 ====
Even before 2010, when Qatar was granted hosting rights for the 2022 FIFA World Cup, the human rights situation of foreign workers in the country was criticized by international human rights organizations. Workers had reported "being treated like cattle with long hours and no days off", and studies of working conditions reported high death rates. A report by Qatar's own government had found almost 1,000 deaths due to working conditions, and others had reported higher numbers.

==== Increased scrutiny and concerns following the granting of the 2022 FIFA World Cup ====
In 2010, Qatar receiving the rights to host the 2022 FIFA World Cup brought renewed interest in previous reports on the systemic abuse of foreign workers in the country, as well as much-increased scrutiny and new reports, investigations and statements by various international human rights and news organizations.

Various organizations expressed concern both about the message of choosing such a country to host the World Cup, and about the potential human costs of the massive construction boom required for the hosting. Human Rights Watch has stated that "FIFA granted Qatar the games in 2010, with no human rights due diligence and no set conditions about protections for migrant workers who would be needed to construct the massive infrastructure."

In 2016, a BBC reporting crew was jailed for two days without charge, after attempting to meet migrant workers.

==== Reforms and continued abuse up to 2026 ====
Between 2014 and 2021, Qatar has announced and enacted many steps of reform, including announcing multiple times that the Kafala system was effectively abolished. Despite these steps, international human rights organizations have rejected the claims that Kafala was abolished. In their reports for the year 2025 both Human Rights Watch and Amnesty International have found that foreign labourers in Qatar continue to face widespread abuses under a "restrictive" and "exploitative" Kafala system. Human Rights Watch's report said that the reforms have had "limited impact", and that the country has failed to address serious violations against workers, who still "face wage theft, unexplained deaths, dangerous working conditions and continued exploitation after the tournament."

===== Role of International Labour Organization =====
In 2014, amid growing international scrutiny of Qatar's treatment of foreign workers in the lead-up to the 2022 FIFA World Cup, international trade unions filed a formal complaint with the International Labour Organization (ILO), accusing Qatar of failing to address forced labour and widespread workers' rights violations.

In March 2023, The New York Times alleged that Qatar "embarked on a yearslong campaign of political maneuvering that helped turn the [ILO]... from critic to ally", and that intense lobbying by Qatari diplomats, rallying "employers and countries with Qatari business interests", successfully prevented the ILO from opening an investigation.

The ILO closed the complaint in 2017, and instead established a established a "Technical Cooperation Program" to help strengthen Qatar's labour regulations. As part of this arrangement, Qatar contributed $25 million to the ILO, which funded the opening of a dedicated ILO project office in Doha in 2018. The ILO stated that the funding was standard practice and did not compromise its mandate, but critics, including a former ILO official, questioned the organization's independence, and noted that the Qatari contribution was initially undisclosed, and of an unusually large sum.

The ILO frequently commended Qatar for implementing labour reforms, such as setting a minimum wage, restricting summertime working hours, and supposedly dismantling the kafala system, consistently taking a positive view. A 2022 ILO report stated that these reforms positively impacted "hundreds of thousands" of migrant workers, a statement repeated by a Qatari official speaking to Financial Times in 2025. A former ILO official told The Guardian in 2023 that the ILO had been "whitewashing Qatar", and that it produced "biased" reports about its reforms. Several current and former employees of the ILO told The New York Times that the organization "often treated Qatar more like a paying client than a country under scrutiny".

ILO officials justified the organization's blunted criticism by saying that the improvements it achieved via cooperation with Qatar were won through "delicate negotiations", and that "criticism... would have undermined that progress"; but, according to The New York Times, "labor advocates, human rights groups and some politicians said they were stunned by what they saw as one-sided public statements that minimized problems". The ILO maintained that while it did point to "the positive trajectory of labour reforms in Qatar", it also continued to "highlight specific gaps and challenges that remain in implementation and enforcement".

== Women's rights ==
=== Male guardianship system ===
As of 2026, women and girls in Qatar are still subject to extensive legal and social discrimination under a male guardianship system. They must receive permission from male guardians "to marry, travel abroad, work in many government jobs, study on scholarships, and access some reproductive health services". Married women can by default travel without permission, but a male guardian can petition a court to issue a travel ban.

A number of women have fled Qatar for the UK because of abuse under the guardianship system.

Noof Al Maadeed, an outspoken critic of Qatar's male guardianship laws, left for the UK because her parents tried to force her to get married against her will. The fears concerning her safety heightened when she spoke of receiving threats on October 13, and mysteriously vanished after returning to Qatar from the UK. She had frequently posted on social media before her disappearance, and told her followers briefly before it happened that "if I'm not on social media, I'm dead". Rumours suggested that she had been killed in government custody. The female Qatari activist later appeared in a series of videos and announced her health and safety on Twitter. A Qatari official said that Qatari authorities were providing assistance to Maadeed, and that she was being cared for at a safe, undisclosed location, but Human Rights Watch continued to raise concerns for her well-being. In March 2023 she posted videos detailing limitations and abuse she has faced, including travel bans and blackmail. The Gulf Centre for Human Rights has said that she "has not been heard from publicly since", but that in mid-2024 it heard that she is "alive but banned from talking to the media or expressing her views on social media networks".

Another young woman, Aisha Al Qahtani, fled due to abuse by her father, a senior military officer, and harassment by Qatari officials.

=== Suffrage ===
Women in Qatar vote and may run for public office. Qatar enfranchised women at the same time as men in connection with the May 1999 elections for the Central Municipal Council, a body that advises the minister for municipal affairs. It was the first Arab country in the Persian Gulf to allow women the right to vote. These elections—the first ever in Qatar—were deliberately held on 8 March 1999, International Women's Day.

=== Labour ===
==== Labor force participation ====
Labor force participation for women in Qatar is roughly 51%, which is higher than the world average, and is the highest rate in the Arab world.

==== Gender wage gap ====
Both Qatari and non-Qatari women are affected by a widening wage gap. They are paid 25% to 50% less than men, despite the fact that their working hours are comparable. The difference is due in part to the social allowances by government afforded to men as household heads, such as housing and travel allotments, which female employees are less likely to receive.

An April 2022 report by the Federation of American Scientists, observed that women in Qatar drive and own property, after reforms made in 2018, enabling women to work in government and the private sector.

In the October 2, 2021, Shura Council elections no women candidates were elected but the Amir included two women among his 15 appointments to the Council for the first time in Shura Council’s history.

==== Judges ====
Some sources name Sheikha Maha Mansour Salman Jasim Al Thani as the first female judge in Qatar. She is a law school graduate from Qatar University, and was sworn into the post in 2010. The Ministry of Foreign Affairs names Hessa Ahmed Al Sulaiti, the senior judge of the Court of Appeals, as the "first female judge in Qatar". In March 2025, as part of a Qatari diplomatic event in Geneva, Al Sulaiti told the United Nations Human Rights Council that at the time 13% of judges in Qatar were women, with plans to increase this figure to 30% by 2030.

=== Sex outside marriage and abortion ===
Women in Qatar convicted for "illicit relations" (sex outside marriage) may be imprisoned for up to seven years, although usually the courts decide on one year. It is often poor domestic workers from Southeast Asian countries who are convicted, even when they have been raped, if the judge thinks they are lying.

Many women who get pregnant with an illegitimate child are jailed. Non-citizens who are forced to have sponsors are usually denied the right to leave Qatar and are therefore forced to seek refuge and counsel from their embassy. Despite the effort of embassies, many still land in jail. According to Najeeb al-Nuaimi, a criminal lawyer and former justice minister of Qatar, many women are able to avoid prison or be released from it by marrying the father of their baby, at which point the woman is allowed to leave the country with her new husband.

In October 2020, several Australian women who were boarding flights from Doha were taken away to undergo invasive gynaecological examinations, after an abandoned newborn baby had been found in the airport toilets and officials were searching for the mother in order to punish her. This caused a diplomatic incident.

=== Sports ===
Qatar sent female athletes to the 2012 Summer Olympics that began on 27 July in London.

=== Migrant women ===
Migrant women are typically seen as a "dual minority" because of their gender and foreignness. According to an account from a female migrant worker, "I felt estranged twice, one for not being a man, secondly for not being able to become one of the Arabs". These women have created a new classification term, FW-W for "foreign working-woman". The overlap of these identities cause this group of women to slip through the cracks unnoticed. Foreign women make up about 20 per cent of the total population and they outnumber female citizens by a ratio of nearly 1:4.

== Individual rights ==
=== Enfranchisement ===
Laws passed in 2021 state that only those who have Qatari nationality since birth and are naturalized citizens with a Qatari grandparent can vote. Only those whose nationality is originally Qatari can run in elections. The migrant workers that make up the majority of Qatar are not considered citizens of the country they work in.

After Qatar's only election for the Shura Council in 2021, where 30 out of 45 seats were elected by the public, further such elections were aborted in 2024.

Since 1999, nonpartisan public elections have been held for the Central Municipal Council, a body that advises the minister for municipal affairs.

=== Freedom of expression ===
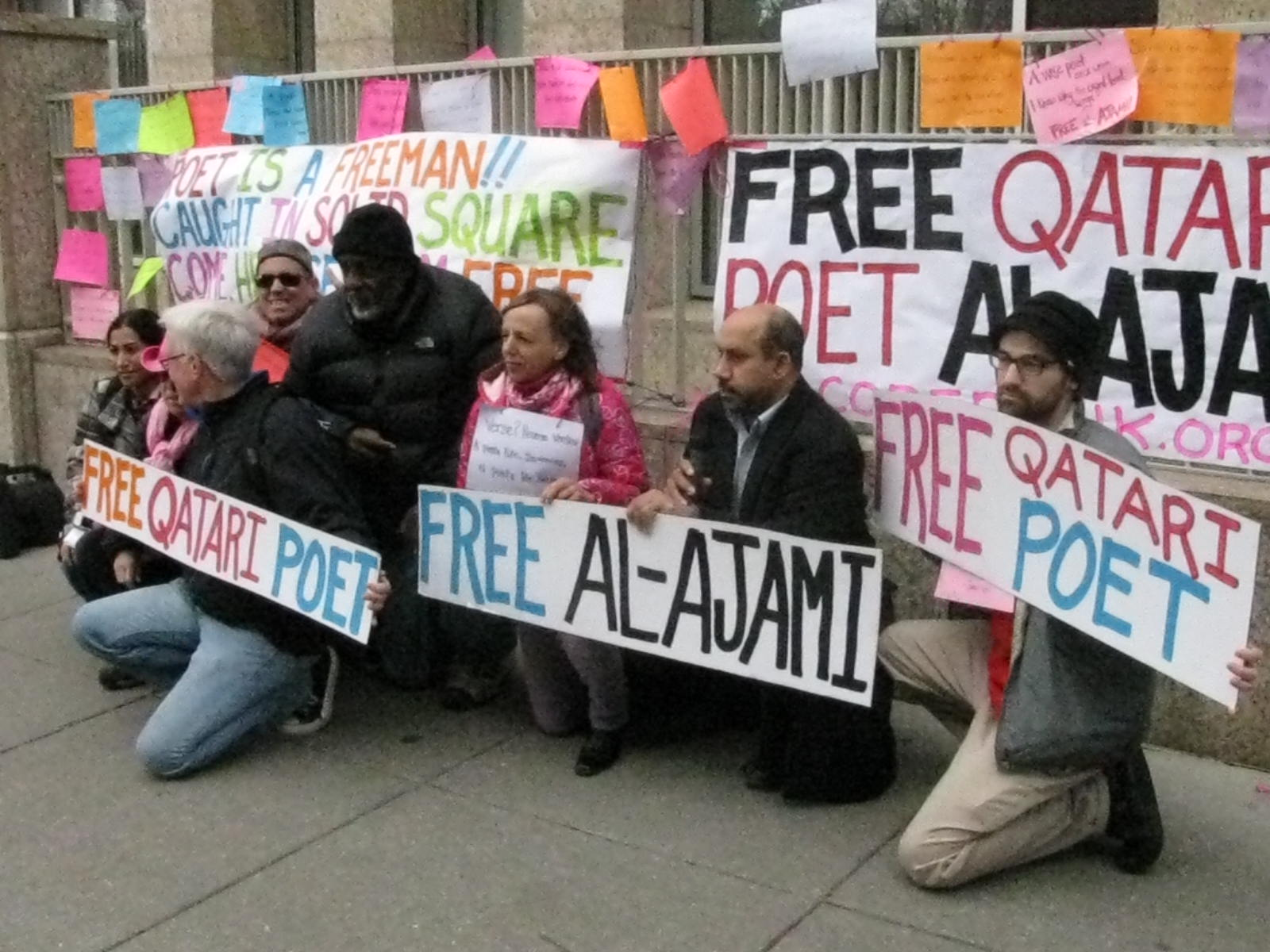
A demonstration held for Mohammed al-Ajami outside the Qatari embassy in Washington, D.C.

In 2026, Human Rights Watch criticized the re-election of Qatar to the UN Human Rights Council, among other things due to its "restrictions on free expression". It noted the criminalization of criticizing the emir, insulting the national flag, blasphemy, inciting regime overthrow, and publishing online "false news" and content that "violates social values" or insults others.

A life sentence was handed to the Qatari poet Mohammed al-Ajami, also known as Mohammed Ibn al-Dheeb, for criticism of the government during the 2012 United Nations Climate Change Conference in Qatar. Observers were not allowed to enter the court, and al-Ajami himself was not present at the sentencing. All the information available points to Mohammed al-Ajami being a prisoner of conscience who had been placed behind bars solely for his words. Al-Ajami was released from prison in March 2016 after a royal pardon commuted his sentence.

A cyber law which passed in late September 2014 severely limited freedom of speech and freedom of expression rights, granting the government and authorities the ability to punish "content that may harm the country" with jail time of up to three years, and fines around 500,000 QR. The law states that the authority may in each individual case judge whether the content is suitable or not. No guidelines or references are currently available to say what type of content is allowed.

On 7 March 2026, the Ministry of Interior announced the arrest of "a person of Arab nationality after he posted a series of tweets on one of his social media accounts that contained direct insults toward the State of Qatar and its institutions". On the same day, the ministry warned the public to "comply with the laws and regulations and to refrain from using social media or digital platforms to spread rumors, incite unrest, defame the State of Qatar and its institutions", and called on the public to "report any such behavior". On 9 March, it announced that 313 foreigners had been arrested for having "filmed and circulated video clips and published misleading information and rumours that could stir public opinion".

==== Internet censorship ====
There are no reports of specific Internet surveillance in Qatar, but a report by Reporters Without Borders said that Ooredoo "has the means to spy on messages sent through the other ISPs." A U.S. State Department Human Rights report said that the government of Qatar censors the Internet through a proxy server that monitors and blocks Web sites, e-mail, and chat rooms through the state-owned ISP.

Qatar is one of the most connected countries in the Arab region, but Internet use is heavily censored. Internet filtering in Qatar is pervasive in the social and Internet tools areas and selective in political and conflict/security areas according to a report by the OpenNet Initiative in August 2009.

Qatar filters pornography, political criticism of Gulf countries, gay and lesbian content, sexual health resources, dating and escort services, and privacy and circumvention tools. Internet users complain that non-obscene or non-offensive Web sites are also blocked. Political filtering is limited, but journalists practice self-censorship and avoid reporting on sensitive issues. The filtering in Qatar is relatively transparent (a block page is served). Qatar's telecom regulator ictQATAR said it does not advise Ooredoo on blocking Internet sites and that Ooredoo blocks sites in accordance with the guidelines issued by law enforcement authorities.

The government of Qatar has imposed a recent amendment to the penal code which furthermore regulates freedom of speech and expression. Article 136 (bis), by Emir Tamim bin Hamid Al Thani, authorizes the imprisonment of anyone who facilitates the spread of fake news online.

=== Residency and naturalisation ===
The Qatari government is keen to maintain things as they are, and are concerned about a change in its conservative cultural values, so there are few ways to achieve citizenship through naturalisation. One way is through marriage to a Qatari citizen, but this does not guarantee it, especially for non-Muslims. Upon occasion, an employer can reward a good and longstanding worker who has benefited the company in a major way by ensuring a work and residence permit for them, but this is annually renewable until the employee's 60th birthday, and only in exceptional circumstances could this be extended to reside indefinitely in Qatar (although never attaining citizenship). Children of foreigners born in Qatar have to assume their parents' nationality; if one parent is Qatari, there is a path to citizenship, but it is not immediate.

Apart from fear of cultural influences, there are concerns about increased expenditure on new citizens; the government provides free education, healthcare, and housing loans for all of its citizens. Another concern is the maintenance of Qatar's political system, based on dynastic succession.

A few foreign residents, who must be able to speak Arabic and lived in Qatar for a minimum of 25 years consecutively, may win citizenship if approved by the Emir. Elite athletes, recruited by the state in order to compete in the Olympics under the Qatari flag, have been granted citizenship in the past.

The situation has long been debated, with especially younger Qataris questioning the restrictive laws, but analysts have suggested that as Qatar's economy becomes less dependent on oil, things might change, as "Qatar will need to attract long-term residents who can contribute to the tax base and support what will eventually become an aging population".

=== LGBTQ rights in Qatar ===
Sodomy between consenting adults (regardless of gender) in Qatar is illegal, and subject to a sentence of up to five years in prison. The law is silent about sodomy between consenting female adults. Sexual orientation and gender identity are not covered in any civil rights laws and there is no recognition of same-sex marriages, civil unions or domestic partnerships.

Under Sharia Law, homosexuality in Qatar is punishable by death penalty for Muslims. The Amnesty International Report 2008 stated there were no executions for convictions of sexual offences in recent years in Qatar. According to the 2016 ILGA report, the death penalty for same-sex sexual behaviour has not been implemented in Qatar.

The New York Times' gay and transgender rights coverage published from April to July 2018 were censored in Qatar. The Doha edition of The New York Times International Edition had large empty areas in the newspaper with a note that the offending articles had been "exceptionally removed". Eight out of nine articles that were censored were on issues affecting the LGBTQ communities.

In 2016, Polish Instagram star and model King Luxy was arrested and held for two months in Qatar for numerous charges, including extortion, blackmail, and cyber assault. Luxy claimed he was arrested for "wearing makeup on Snapchat and Instagram".

=== Freedom of religion ===
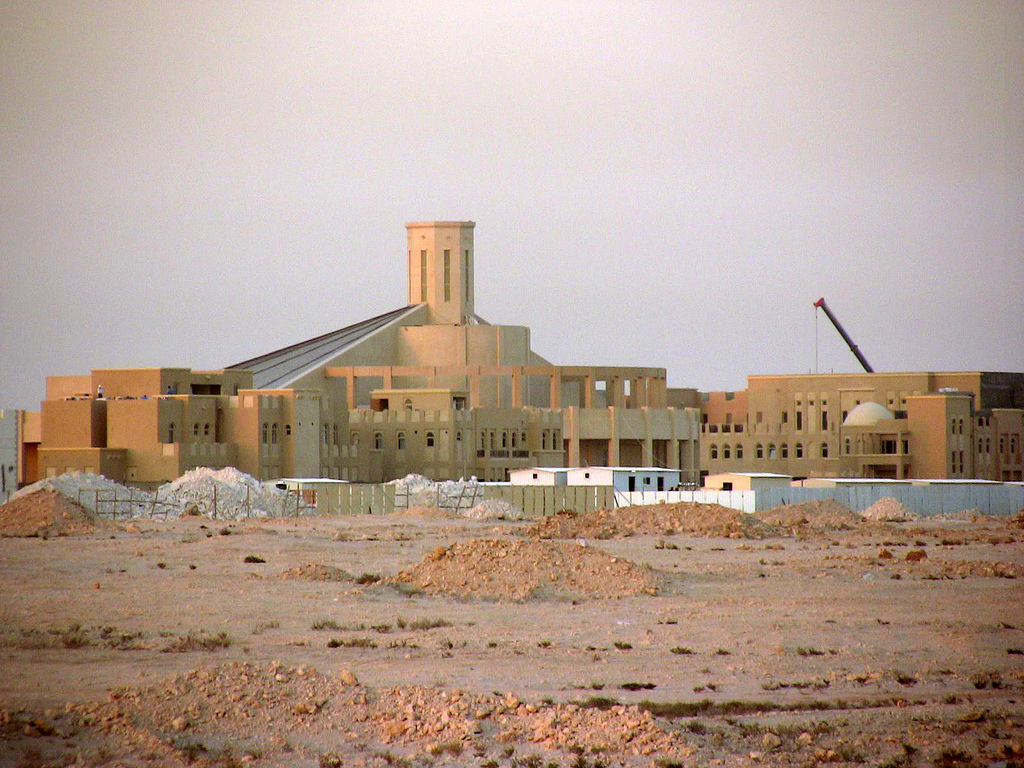
Qatar's first Catholic church is not permitted to have Christian symbols on its exterior.

Qatar is a Muslim-majority nation, with 76% of its population adhering to Islam. The government uses Sunni law as the basis of its criminal and civil regulations. Religious groups must register with the Ministry of Foreign Affairs for legal recognition; six Christian denominations (Catholic, Anglican, Greek Orthodox, Syrian Orthodox, Coptic and Indian Christian) are officially recognised, all worshipping at a government-provided complex in Mesaimeer on the outskirts of Doha. Recognition requires a denomination to have at least 1,500 members in the country. Other religions, including Hinduism, Buddhism and the Bahá'í Faith, are not legally recognised, although adherents are permitted to worship privately in homes or workplaces.

For example, in March 2008 the Roman Catholic church Our Lady of the Rosary was consecrated in Doha. In keeping with a general policy that prohibits Christian congregations from advertising religious services or using religious symbols visible to the public, such as outdoor crosses, no missionaries are allowed and the church will not have any bells, crosses or other overtly Christian signs on its exterior. The government has at times censored internet content with religious themes through a state-controlled proxy, and reviews and occasionally censors foreign newspapers for material deemed offensive to Islam, such as the 2005 Danish cartoons of Muhammad.

Although abandoning Islam is considered apostasy, which is technically an offence subject to the death penalty, no such punishment has been recorded since Qatar gained independence in 1971. Qatari authorities have nevertheless brought prosecutions under related statutes governing religious speech. In August 2025 Remy Rowhani, chair of the National Spiritual Assembly of the Bahá'ís in Qatar, was sentenced by a Doha court to five years' imprisonment under article 259 of the penal code for promoting a doctrine that "casts doubt on the foundations and teachings of Islam"; the conviction was overturned on appeal on 30 September 2025 and Rowhani was released on 4 October 2025.

Blasphemy is punishable by up to seven years in prison. Under the criminal code, proselytizing on behalf of an organisation for any religion other than Islam carries a prison term of up to 10 years; individual proselytizing carries up to five years; possession of missionary materials carries up to two years and a 10,000 Qatari riyal fine. No proselytizing conviction has been recorded since the law's enactment in 1973; in practice, suspected proselytizers are deported without legal proceedings.

==== Treatment of Bahá'ís ====
The Bahá'í community present in Qatar since at least the 1950s and numbering around 100 people of Iranian origin, some of them Qatari nationals, is not legally recognized by the state. Human Rights Watch, the United States Commission on International Religious Freedom (USCIRF), the Baháʼí International Community (BIC) and a group of UN special rapporteurs have documented a sustained pattern of administrative discrimination, including deportations, blacklisting, denial of residency-permit renewals, restrictions on the community's cemetery, and refusal to register marriage certificates issued by Baháʼí institutions.

According to Human Rights Watch, Qatari authorities deported as many as 14 Baháʼís between 2003 and 2025 with no stated reason beyond their religious affiliation, and a high-ranking Qatari religious figure told one Baháʼí that announcing conversion to Sunni Islam would "make the deportation go away". The community's cemetery in the Thumama district of Doha — in use since 1953 — was partially bulldozed by the Doha municipality in 2009 until the Emir ordered the work stopped; permission to construct a permanent replacement site, identified in al-Wakra Municipality in 2015, has not been granted.

In April 2021, Remy Rowhani, chair of the National Spiritual Assembly of the Bahá'ís of Qatar and a former head of Qatar's Chamber of Commerce, was tried in absentia and convicted under the 2014 Law on the Regulation of Charitable Activities for collecting voluntary religious donations from community members; the sentence was upheld in 2022 by the Court of Cassation. Rowhani was arrested again in April 2025 and in August 2025 sentenced to five years' imprisonment under penal-code article 259 ("casting doubt on the foundations and teachings of Islam"), the 2014 Cybercrime Prevention Law, and the 1979 Publications Law, on the basis of an X account celebrating Qatari holidays and Baháʼí values. The International Bar Association's Human Rights Institute, in a joint letter signed by Baroness Helena Kennedy KC, Payam Akhavan and other legal scholars, condemned the conviction as violating multiple articles of the International Covenant on Civil and Political Rights (to which Qatar acceded in 2018) and as falling short of basic fair-trial standards. The conviction was overturned on appeal on 30 September 2025 and Rowhani was released on 4 October 2025; the prosecution retained a 60-day window to appeal further.

In a statement of 30 April 2026 the Baháʼí International Community said that "over 40 percent of Qatar's Baháʼí population faces imminent expulsion" through non-renewal of residency permits, characterising the policy as a "deliberate campaign of religious erasure". In 2026 USCIRF for the first time recommended that the US government place Qatar on its Special Watchlist of countries violating religious freedom. In June 2026 Human Rights Watch reported that since March 2026 the authorities had ordered at least four people holding roles in the community's institutions to leave the country without due process or any avenue of appeal, one of them detained for a week while awaiting deportation; in May 2026 UN experts had called on Qatar to reverse the deportations, warning of the "potential erasure of the Bahá'í religious community from Qatar".

==== Alcohol and pork consumption ====
Alcohol consumption is partially legal in Qatar; some five-star luxury hotels are allowed to sell alcohol to their non-Muslim customers. Muslims are not allowed to consume alcohol in Qatar, and Muslims caught consuming alcohol are liable to flogging or deportation. Non-Muslim expatriates can obtain a permit to purchase alcohol for personal consumption. The Qatar Distribution Company (a subsidiary of Qatar Airways) is permitted to import alcohol and pork; it operates the sole liquor store in the country, which also sells pork to holders of liquor licences. Qatari officials have also indicated a willingness to allow alcohol in "fan zones" at the 2022 FIFA World Cup.

Up until December 2011, restaurants on The Pearl Island (a man-made island near Doha) were allowed to serve alcoholic drinks, but they were then told to stop selling alcohol. No explanation was given for the ban. Speculation about the reason includes the government's desire to project a more pious image in advance of the country's first election of a royal advisory body, and rumours of a financial dispute between the government and the resort's developers.

==== Freedom of dress ====
In 2014, Qatar launched a modesty campaign to remind tourists of the modest dress code. Female tourists were advised not to wear leggings, miniskirts, sleeveless dresses and short or tight clothing in public. Men were advised against wearing only shorts and singlets.

=== Language barriers ===
In terms of basic human rights, people of Qatar face obstacles in communication and connection from language barriers. Not everyone in Qatar speaks Arabic and there is a heavy population of migrant workers that speak other languages; basic human rights are affected because of this lack of communication. For instance, access to health care is impacted. A patient that does not speak English or Arabic will have difficulty trying to receive treatment.

Qatar is predominantly made up of foreigners who do not speak the national languages, and they will have trouble in receiving treatment since they cannot voice their issues. Because of the language barrier patients might receive incorrect treatment or the wrong treatment for their ailment, which can make their situation even worse. Besides health care, the other interactions with important institutions that are counterproductive due to a lack of communication. According to the journal, "Patient Perspectives on Languages Discordance During Healthcare Visits: Findings From the Extremely High-Density Multicultural State of Qatar", addressing the work force of Qatar, "Qatar, … heavily in the development of its healthcare infrastructure in recent years to keep pace with rapid economic expansion. The expatriate population living and working in the country constitutes 94.14% of the total workforce (Qatar Permanent Population Committee, 2011)".

The majority of workers who control the forward progression of advancements of Qatar do not speak the national language. Migrant labour workers are the backbone of the country and those who are in charge of them probably cannot even communicate with them. The language barriers also create cultural and ethnic divides. About 90% of Qatar's population is made of non-citizens. Qatar has the highest population of migrants in the world and 94% of its economically active population are not Qatari natives.

== Children ==
Until 2005, children as young as four years old were used as jockeys in camel racing, which is a popular sport in the Gulf region. Children were also being trafficked from other countries, and often starved to keep their body weight down. The sport is a dangerous one, with the danger of hurt in a fall or being trampled underfoot. Robot jockeys created by a Swiss company were introduced to use instead of children when the then Emir of Qatar, Hamad Al Thani, introduced the ban.

== Governmental human rights organisations ==
=== National Human Rights Committee ===
The National Human Rights Committee (NHRC) was founded in 2002 with the responsibility of overseeing and carrying out investigations on human rights abuses in the country. Their stated methods of advancing the country's standards of human rights include contributing to research programs related to human rights, conducting studies, and providing advice and recommendations to legislative bodies.

The NHRC has been accredited by the United Nations' Global Alliance of National Human Rights Institutions (GANHRI) with "A status", meaning formal compliance with the Paris Principles relating to the status of NHRIs, since 2009. However, GANHRI has repeatedly criticized certain aspects of the NHRC's structure and conduct, as can be seen in its latest report on the matter from 2021.

One of the main and persistent subjects of criticism has been the appointment and dismissal of NHRC members by the emir, and in processes that lack transparency, clear criteria, and broad consultation and/or participation. The 2021 report noted that GAHNRI's recommendations on this subject from 2009 and 2015 remain unaddressed. The 2021 report also criticized the membership of government ministry representatives in the decision-making body of the NHRC (though it noted that they form a minority and do not hold voting rights), and especially highlighted "the lack of clarity" as to the current vice-chair's relationship to a government ministry, warning that these issues have "the potential to impact on both the real and perceived independence" of the NHRC.

In 2021, it was reported by the Brookings Doha Center that the NHRC was one of the few national human rights institutions (NHRIs) that had a help desk staffed with representatives from communities of "common migrant origin countries". It also noted that while the annual report of the NHRC is "one of the better ones" among NHRIs in the MENA region in terms of the consistency of its reporting methods, after 2010 it stopped providing information about how it has handled cases that reached it. The 2010 report showed that it had received 791 complaints, 663 of which were referred to "competent authorities", and among these 398 did not receive a reply from the agency that they were referred to, and 98 had no information available about them. 17 of the complaints were classified as "rejected" by the NHRC, and 13 were classified as "resolved". The Brookings report noted that the cessation of reporting about the results of cases "make(s) it difficult to assess the NHRC's effectiveness at addressing the complaints it receives".

=== Department of Human Rights in the Ministry of Foreign Affairs ===
Law 39, issued in 2005, stipulated the formation of a "Department of Human Rights" in the Ministry of Foreign Affairs. One of its main missions is to prepare answers on the claims or reports of foreign countries and organisations on the situation of human rights inside the state.

== Tayeb Benabderrahmane case ==
In 2020, Franco-Algerian lobbyist Tayeb Benabderrahmane was arrested in Doha and detained for nearly a year. According to his lawyers, he spent 307 days in arbitrary detention, first in prison and then under house arrest, without effective access to consular assistance or to an independent lawyer. He claims he was subjected to pressure and ill-treatment before being released in October 2020 on condition that he sign a confidentiality protocol with financial penalties.

After returning to France, he brought proceedings before French courts in 2022 for kidnapping, unlawful detention and torture. On 31 May 2023, the Doha criminal court sentenced him to death in absentia for espionage. The existence of this sentence was only revealed publicly in November 2023, prompting strong criticism in the French and international press of the silence of the French authorities, who had been formally informed in July 2023.

The case took on a new dimension when Benabderrahmane initiated proceedings before the International Centre for Settlement of Investment Disputes under the 1996 France–Qatar bilateral investment treaty. On 20 December 2023, the World Bank tribunal adopted a provisional order requesting Qatar to suspend the execution of the death penalty, a measure described as an unprecedented development in the history of investment law.

In July 2025, the United Nations Working Group on Arbitrary Detention adopted Opinion No. 28/2025, concluding that Benabderrahmane’s deprivation of liberty was arbitrary. The WGAD called on Qatar to conduct an independent investigation, to provide full reparation, and to report to the UN Human Rights Council on the measures taken. The decision constituted the first formal condemnation of Qatar by this UN mechanism concerning a French national.

The case has been widely commented on by the press and human rights NGOs, who see it as a revealing example of the limits of the rule of law in Qatar, the tensions between diplomatic cooperation and compliance with international human rights obligations, and the inaction of the French government on the matter.

== Historical ratings ==
The following chart shows Qatar's ratings since 1972 in the Freedom in the World reports, published annually by Freedom House. A rating of 1 is "free"; 7, "not free".

Historical ratings
Year	Political Rights	Civil Liberties	Status	Emir
1972	6	5	Not Free	Sheikh Khalifa bin Hamad Al Thani
1973	6	5	Not Free	Sheikh Khalifa bin Hamad Al Thani
1974	6	5	Not Free	Sheikh Khalifa bin Hamad Al Thani
1975	6	5	Not Free	Sheikh Khalifa bin Hamad Al Thani
1976	5	5	Partly Free	Sheikh Khalifa bin Hamad Al Thani
1977	5	5	Partly Free	Sheikh Khalifa bin Hamad Al Thani
1978	5	5	Partly Free	Sheikh Khalifa bin Hamad Al Thani
1979	5	5	Partly Free	Sheikh Khalifa bin Hamad Al Thani
1980	5	5	Partly Free	Sheikh Khalifa bin Hamad Al Thani
1981	5	5	Partly Free	Sheikh Khalifa bin Hamad Al Thani
1982	5	5	Partly Free	Sheikh Khalifa bin Hamad Al Thani
1983	5	5	Partly Free	Sheikh Khalifa bin Hamad Al Thani
1984	5	5	Partly Free	Sheikh Khalifa bin Hamad Al Thani
1985	5	5	Partly Free	Sheikh Khalifa bin Hamad Al Thani
1986	5	5	Partly Free	Sheikh Khalifa bin Hamad Al Thani
1987	5	5	Partly Free	Sheikh Khalifa bin Hamad Al Thani
1988	5	5	Partly Free	Sheikh Khalifa bin Hamad Al Thani
1989	7	5	Not Free	Sheikh Khalifa bin Hamad Al Thani
1990	7	5	Not Free	Sheikh Khalifa bin Hamad Al Thani
1991	7	5	Not Free	Sheikh Khalifa bin Hamad Al Thani
1992	7	6	Not Free	Sheikh Khalifa bin Hamad Al Thani
1993	7	6	Not Free	Sheikh Khalifa bin Hamad Al Thani
1994	7	6	Not Free	Sheikh Khalifa bin Hamad Al Thani
1995	7	6	Not Free	Sheikh Hamad bin Khalifa Al Thani
1996	7	6	Not Free	Sheikh Hamad bin Khalifa Al Thani
1997	7	6	Not Free	Sheikh Hamad bin Khalifa Al Thani
1998	7	6	Not Free	Sheikh Hamad bin Khalifa Al Thani
1999	6	6	Not Free	Sheikh Hamad bin Khalifa Al Thani
2000	6	6	Not Free	Sheikh Hamad bin Khalifa Al Thani
2001	6	6	Not Free	Sheikh Hamad bin Khalifa Al Thani
2002	6	6	Not Free	Sheikh Hamad bin Khalifa Al Thani
2003	6	6	Not Free	Sheikh Hamad bin Khalifa Al Thani
2004	6	6	Not Free	Sheikh Hamad bin Khalifa Al Thani
2005	6	5	Not Free	Sheikh Hamad bin Khalifa Al Thani
2006	6	5	Not Free	Sheikh Hamad bin Khalifa Al Thani
2007	6	5	Not Free	Sheikh Hamad bin Khalifa Al Thani
2008	6	5	Not Free	Sheikh Hamad bin Khalifa Al Thani
2009	6	5	Not Free	Sheikh Hamad bin Khalifa Al Thani
2010	6	5	Not Free	Sheikh Hamad bin Khalifa Al Thani
2011	6	5	Not Free	Sheikh Hamad bin Khalifa Al Thani
2012	6	5	Not Free	Sheikh Hamad bin Khalifa Al Thani
2013	6	5	Not Free	Sheikh Hamad bin Khalifa Al Thani
2014	6	5	Not Free	Sheikh Tamim bin Hamad Al Thani
2015	6	5	Not Free	Sheikh Tamim bin Hamad Al Thani
2016	6	5	Not Free	Sheikh Tamim bin Hamad Al Thani
2017	6	5	Not Free	Sheikh Tamim bin Hamad Al Thani
2018	6	5	Not Free	Sheikh Tamim bin Hamad Al Thani
2019	6	5	Not Free	Sheikh Tamim bin Hamad Al Thani
2020	6	5	Not Free	Sheikh Tamim bin Hamad Al Thani
2021	6	5	Not Free	Sheikh Tamim bin Hamad Al Thani
2022	6	5	Not Free	Sheikh Tamim bin Hamad Al Thani
2023	6	5	Not Free	Sheikh Tamim bin Hamad Al Thani
2024	6	5	Not Free	Sheikh Tamim bin Hamad Al Thani

== See also ==
- Human rights in the Middle East
