= Tayeb Benabderrahmane v. Qatar =

Tayeb Benabderrahmane v. Qatar is an ongoing international investment arbitration case concerning the alleged arbitrary arrest, detention, torture, seizure of assets, and death sentence imposed in absentia by the State of Qatar on French-Algerian businessman and consultant, Tayeb Benabderrahmane.

The case is being adjudicated under the auspices of the International Centre for Settlement of Investment Disputes (ICSID) and involves claims of breach of the 1996 Bilateral Investment Treaty (BIT) between France and Qatar on the reciprocal encouragement and protection of investments. In July 2025, the United Nations Working Group on Arbitrary Detention adopted Opinion No. 28/2025, concluding that Benabderrahmane’s deprivation of liberty was arbitrary.

== Background ==
Tayeb Benabderrahmane, a dual French and Algerian national, resided in Doha where he had worked as the chief advisor to the chairman of the Qatar National Human Rights Committee (NHRC) between 2017 and 2019. His tenure involved work on anti-corruption campaigns and investigating alleged embezzlement.

=== Arbitrary arrest, detention and torture ===
On January 13, 2020, shortly after resigning from his advisory role at the NHRC, Benabderrahmane was arrested at his home in Doha by Qatari State Security services without a warrant or legal counsel. He alleges that he was held in secret detention for 19 days, during which he was subjected to physical and psychological torture, including sleep deprivation and extreme physical constraints. Following the secret detention, he was reportedly transferred to Salwa Road prison, where he spent five months in solitary confinement. He claims he was coerced into signing documents in Arabic without translation, which were later used as fabricated evidence against him.

In October 2020, Benabderrahmane was released from detention on the condition that he sign a confidentiality agreement with financial penalties before being deported to France on November 1, 2020. He claims his assets were seized during the sequence of events, which took place between January 13 and October 31, 2020.

=== Death sentence in absentia ===
In 2022, After his return to France, Benabderrahmane initiated criminal proceedings in the French courts, filing a complaint as a civil party for kidnapping, unlawful detention, torture, and extortion in an organized group. In a parallel development, the Qatar Criminal Court sentenced Benabderrahmane to death in absentia on May 31, 2023, on charges of espionage. The existence of this sentence was reportedly only revealed publicly in November 2023, although Qatari authorities had formally informed French authorities in July 2023. Benabderrahmane contends he was never informed of the existence of the criminal proceedings or the death sentence pronounced against him.

== International Legal Proceedings ==
=== ICSID Arbitration ===
On September 14, 2023, Benabderrahmane commenced international investment arbitration proceedings against the State of Qatar under the framework of the 1996 France-Qatar BIT. The claim is based on the alleged consequences of his arrest, detention, and asset seizure, arguing that these actions constitute expropriation and a denial of fair and equitable treatment as required by the BIT. The arbitration is administered by the International Centre for Settlement of Investment Disputes (ICSID), an institution of the World Bank.

==== Provisional Measures ====
Following the revelation of his death sentence, Benabderrahmane submitted an application for provisional measures and temporary relief to the ICSID tribunal on November 3, 2023. The application sought an order for Qatar to refrain from any conduct that could harm the life and safety of the claimant, his relatives, or other individuals related to the arbitration.

On December 20, 2023, the ICSID Tribunal issued Procedural Order No. 5, adopting a provisional order that requested Qatar to suspend the execution of the death penalty. The Tribunal later issued further procedural orders relating to confidentiality and jurisdiction.

=== United Nations Working Group on Arbitrary Detention ===
On April 8, 2025, the United Nations Working Group on Arbitrary Detention (WGAD) adopted Opinion No. 28/2025. The WGAD concluded that Benabderrahmane's deprivation of liberty was arbitrary, citing three categories of violation: the deprivation of liberty was impossible to justify by invoking any legal basis; the deprivation of liberty was due to the exercise of the right to freedom of expression and opinion; and grave violations of the right to a fair trial were committed, accompanied by acts of torture and inhuman treatment.

The WGAD called upon the Government of Qatar to conduct an independent investigation, prosecute those responsible, provide full reparation, and compensate Benabderrahmane.
