= Ali bin Samikh al-Marri =

Qatar politician; Minister of Labour

His Excellency Ali bin Saeed bin Samikh al-Marri
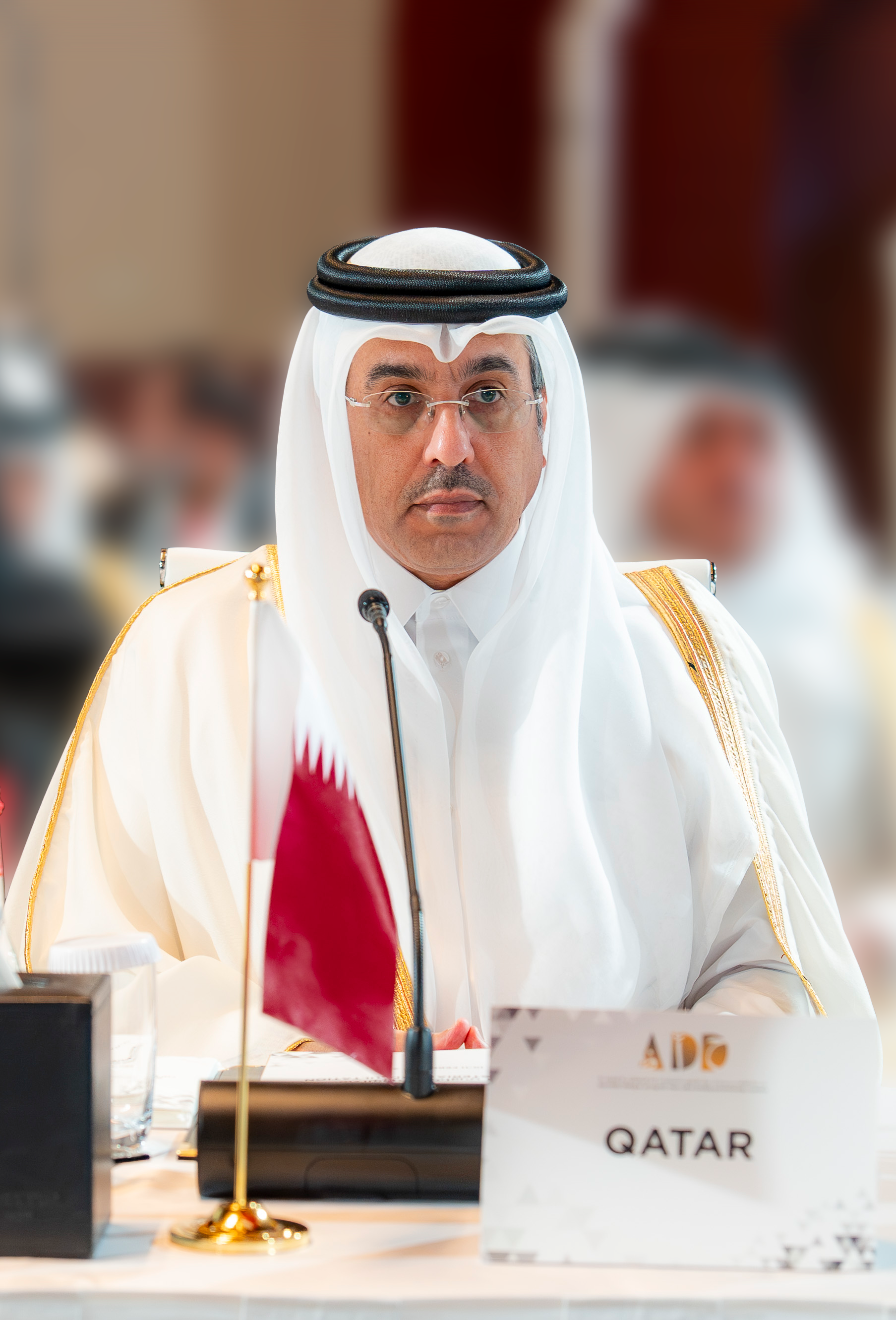
- Al-Marri in 2024

Minister of Labour
- Incumbent
- Assumed office October 19, 2021
- Appointed by: Tamim bin Hamad Al Thani
- Prime Minister: Khalid bin Khalifa bin Abdul Aziz Al Thani; Mohammed bin Abdulrahman bin Jassim Al Thani
- Preceded by: Yousuf Mohamed Al Othman Fakhroo

Personal details
- Born: November 30, 1972 (age 53)
- Education: PhD in Political Science (2006); MA of Political Science (2002); BA of Political Science (1997)

Ali bin Saeed bin Samikh al-Marri (Arabic: علي بن سعيد بن صميخ المري) is a Qatari human rights figure and politician born on November 30, 1972. He was appointed Minister of Labour of the State of Qatar on October 19, 2021, and was re-appointed Minister of Labor by an Amiri order in March 2023. Before taking up the ministerial portfolio, he had chaired the National Human Rights Committee (NHRC) for State of Qatar since 2009. He also served as acting president and secretary-general of the Global Alliance of National Human Rights Institutions and as president of the Arab Network of National Human Rights Institutions. In 2012 he was elected chairman of the Permanent Arab Committee on Human Rights of the Arab League and chairman of the Asia Pacific Forum for the session 2013 to 2015. He was re-elected as chairman of the NHRC of the State of Qatar in 2019. In June 2023, al-Marri was elected as president of the United Nations' annual International Labour Conference.

== Education and career ==
Dr. Ali Bin Samikh al-Marri earned a Ph.D. in political science in 2006, a master's in political science in 2002 and a bachelor's in political science in 1997.

Al-Marri has said that after gaining a Ph.D., he has been engaged with human rights and humanitarian work through field and functional work, as he has a long expertise in international circles regarding protection and promotion of human rights at both local and international levels, which has contributed to Qatar's accession to a number of conventions, protocols and charters related to human rights during his tenure as the chairman of the National Human Rights Committee of Qatar (NHRC).

During his tenure at the NHRC, al-Marri has also held the roles of Vice President and Secretary General of the Global Alliance of National Human Rights Institutions (GANHRI). Under his leadership, the NHRC also chaired GANRHI's Sub-Committee on Accreditation (SCA), which is responsible for assessing and accrediting National Human Rights Institutions (NHRIs).

== Qatargate scandal ==
Ali bin Samikh al-Marri has been mentioned in the Belgian judicial investigation known as the "Qatargate" scandal, opened in December 2022 into allegations of corruption and foreign interference within the European Parliament. In 2023, rumours surfaced that the Belgian authorities issued an international arrest warrant against al-Marri and one of his assistants in the matter. The warrant was suspended a few months afterwards with speculations that it was related to the release of Belgian humanitarian worker Olivier Vandecasteele detained in Iran.

== Involvement in the Tayeb Benabderrahmane case ==
Ali bin Samikh al-Marri has also been cited in the case of Franco-Algerian lobbyist Tayeb Benabderrahmane, who was arbitrarly arrested in Doha in January 2020 and detained for 307 days. Benabderrahmane claims he was subjected to ill-treatment and pressure related to his possession of sensitive documents concerning Nasser Al-Khelaifi, president of Paris Saint-Germain.

In 2022, Benabderrahmane filed a complaint in France, becoming a civil party in a judicial investigation for kidnapping, unlawful detention, torture, and extortion in an organized group. The case in Paris targeted Nasser Al-Khelaifi as well as personalities from his entourage, including lawyers Francis Szpiner, Olivier Pardo, and Rachida Dati.

Al-Marri's precise role in this matter remains unclear. He is mentioned in connection with his relationship with Benabderrahmane and his former position as head of Qatar's National Human Rights Committee, the institution that employed Benabderrahmane. Alleged tensions between the Qatari networks of al-Marri and Al-Khelaifi are also reported to have played a part in Benabderrahmane's arrest.

In 2025, the United Nations Working Group on Arbitrary Detention recognized Benabderrahmane's detention as arbitrary and called on Qatar to provide compensation. In parallel, Benabderrahmane initiated arbitration proceedings before the International Centre for Settlement of Investment Disputes, contesting the expropriation of his assets and demanding reparations from Qatar.

His case also drew media attention in France due to a death sentence pronounced in absentia in Qatar in 2023, which remains under dispute in ongoing legal proceedings.

== Positions and memberships ==
- Dr. Ali bin Saeed bin Samikh al-Marri is the current Minister of Labour in Qatar.
- Member of the National Planning Council - May 2024.
- Chairman of the board of directors of the Arab Labor Organization 2024.
- Chairman of the National Manpower Planning Committee at the Ministry of Labor - March 2024.
- President of the International Labour Conference, 111th session of 2023.
- Vice-president of the International Labour Conference, 110th session of 2022.
- President of the Arab Network for National Human Rights Institutions: June 2021 - October 2021 session. He was elected during the 17th General Assembly of Arab Network of National Human Rights Institutions.
- National Committee for Combating Human Trafficking in January 2022.
- Qatar Manpower Solutions Company "Jusour" in January 2023.
- Secretary-General of the Global Alliance of National Human Rights Institutions: 2018 - 2021.
- Workers' Support and Insurance Fund in November 2021.
- Vice President of the GANRHI: 2018 - 2021.
- This happened during the General Assembly Meeting of the GANRHI on Tuesday, 5 February 2019 at the Palace of Nations in Geneva, following electing Dr. al-Marri as the vice-president, secretary-general and member of the Executive Bureau of the GANRHI.
- Chairman of the National Human Rights Committee (NHRC): 2009 - 2021. Dr. al-Marri has been the chairman of the NHRC for the past 12 years.
- President of the Arab Network for National Human Rights Institutions from 2012 to 2021.
- Vice President of the Asia Pacific Forum (APF) of National Human Rights Institutions: 2015–2017.
- Chairman of the Sub-Committee on Accreditation (SCA) of the GANHRI: 2012–2015. According to the recent statement of the NHRC, The Sub-Committee on Accreditation (SCA) of the International Coordinating Committee of National Human Rights Institutions has decided to re-elect Dr. Ali bin Smaikh al-Marri, Chairman of Qatar NHRC as president of the committee for the third time.
- President of the APF of National Human Rights Institutions: 2013–2015. This is backed up by the APF happened in Morocco of the year 2014. During his time which he mainly addressed the initiatives for protecting and promoting the rights of women.
- Chairman of the Permanent Arab Human Rights Committee of the League of Arab States: 2012-2014 During his term, Dr. Ali have made major efforts to ensure that the Arab League has an organized and achieved its objectives clearly.
- Vice-chairman of the Committee of Arab Human Rights Panel of Experts in the Arab League: 2008–2009.
- Vice Chairman of the NHRC in the State of Qatar: 2007–2009. One of the book being published under the regulation of Dr. al-Marri discussing the labor law in Qatar.

== Books ==
- "Majlis Al Tawoon Al Khaliji: Azmat Al Hader Wa Tahadiyyat Al Mustaqbal" - The Gulf Cooperation Council: present crises and future challenges.
- "At-Tahawul Al Demoktari fi Dawlat Qatar" - Democratic Transition in the State of Qatar.

== Research ==
Dr. Ali Bin Samikh al-Marri has written a number of research papers on human rights, including "Philosophical Thought and the Values of the Major Revolutions as a Source of Human Rights", "Eliminating Child Labour by Applying it to Some Arab States", "The Principle of The Prohibition of Forced Labour", "International Protection of Human Rights During Armed Conflicts and Under Occupation", "The Impact of International and Regional Transformations on The Gulf Cooperation Council", "The Legal Status of Jerusalem", "Sierra Leone From Slavery to The Civil War", "Egyptian-Sudanese Water Relations", "State Functions Under Individualist Direction", "The Determinants of Qatar's Foreign Policy" and "The Political and Constitutional Development of The State of Qatar Under The Permanent Constitution".

== Role as Qatar's Labour Minister ==
Ali bin Samikh al-Marri is the Qatari Minister of Labour and former chairman of the National Human Rights Committee (NHRC) in. He has been involved in leading efforts to reform the treatment of migrant workers in the country, particularly in the construction industry. These efforts have focused on improving working and living conditions of migrant workers in Qatar and, increasing transparency and accountability, and addressing issues of labor exploitation. Since he assumed his position as the labour minister, al-Marri has intensified efforts in ensuring the protection of workers.

His Excellency the Minister of Labour has overall responsibility for all Ministry of Labour issues, including:

- Proposing and executing public policies, regulations and systems concerning the workforce
- Overseeing recruitment policies and Qatarisation (nationalisation) of jobs
- Implementing the labour law
- Protecting migrant workers socially and legally

Al-Marri and ILO are continuously working together on areas of labour reforms including occupational safety and health, intensifying efforts to combat forced labour and human trafficking, and supporting companies to revise their policies and procedures in line with the new legislation.

In May 2021, a new Ministerial Decision was introduced to protect workers during the hottest months of the year (From 1 June to 15 September) particularly outdoor workers who are exposed to the heat, humidity and the sun, must work between 10 am and 3:30 pm.

On 3 November 2022, Ali bin Samikh al-Marri he had a meeting with the director-general of the International Labour Organization (ILO) Gilbert F. Houngbo, in Geneva, and during the meeting, the progress was noticed in the continuous technical cooperation program between the ILO and Qatar."Recent labour reforms by the State of Qatar have brought positive results. I thank Minister al-Marri for their commitment to pursue these reforms and their implementation, in line with Qatar's vision 2030. The ILO is ready to continue supporting the State of Qatar, to bring further improvements that benefit all workers," said Director-General Houngbo in the meeting.

== Role in the Qatar blockade ==
Al-Marri's role emerged in light of the blockade imposed by Saudi Arabia, the UAE, Bahrain and Egypt on Qatar on June 5, 2017, through his great efforts on the human rights level. Acting as the chairman of the National Human Rights Committee, he adopted regional and international moves to explain the catastrophic effects of the blockade, through communication with international governmental and non-governmental organizations and delivering press statements about the blockading states, in addition to participating and holding many international conferences that would document the repercussions of the blockade.

During blockade he led various communications, through an array of international forums, calling for the necessity of immediate action to end the suffering of those affected by the blockade imposed on Qatar, and urging human rights organizations, regional and international organizations and other parties to assume their responsibilities to stop the blockade against Qatar.

== See also ==
- Bin Samikh Tower
