= Saribekyan and Balyan v. Azerbaijan =

Saribekyan and Balayan v. Azerbaijan
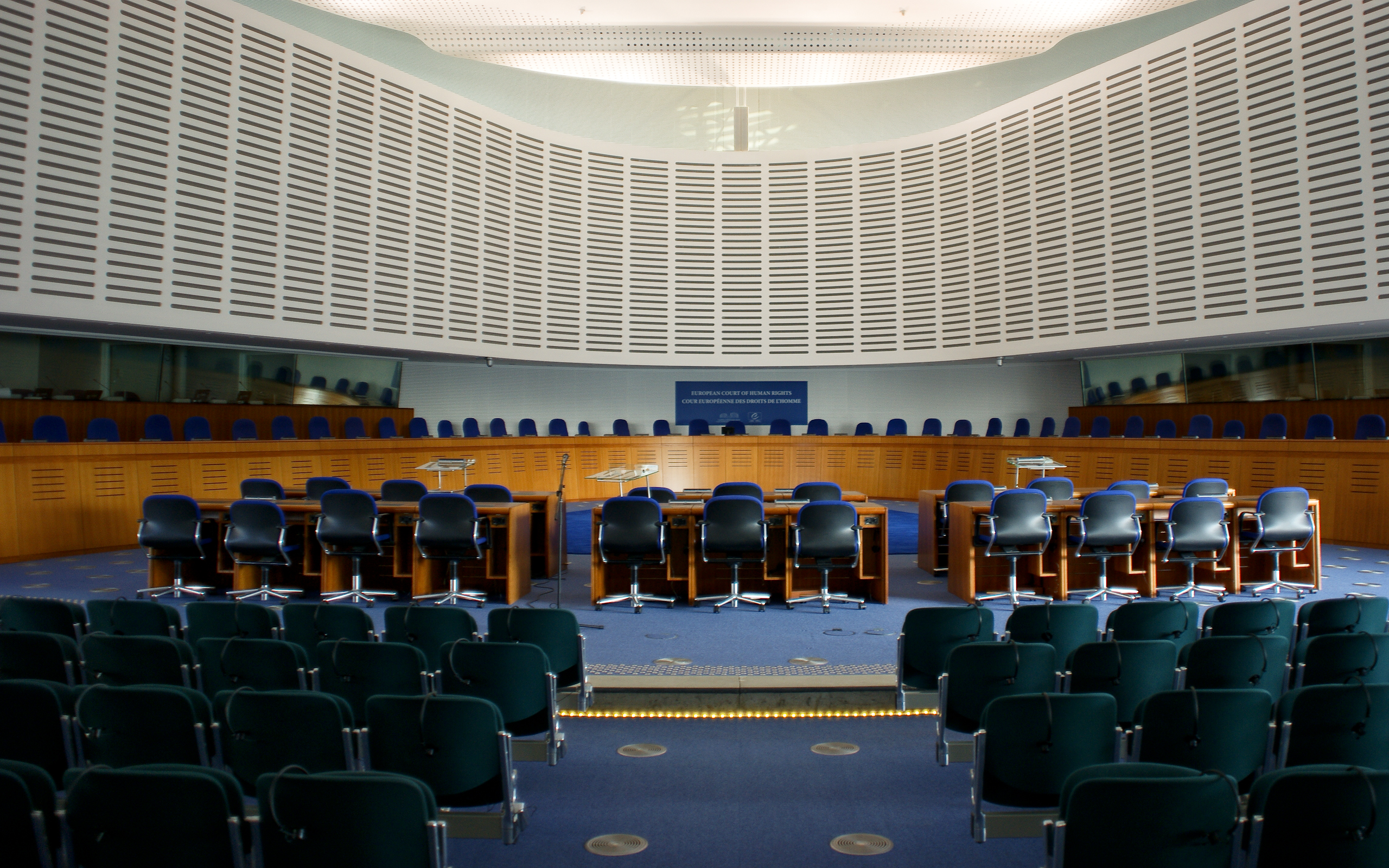
- Court: European Court of Human Rights
- Decided: 30 January 2020
- Citations: European Convention on Human Rights - Articles 2, 3, 13 and 14

Court membership
- Judges sitting: Angelika Nußberger - President, Yonko Grozev, Ganna Yudkivska, Síofra O’Leary, Mārtiņš Mits, Latif Huseynov, Lado Chanturia

Saribekyan and Balyan v. Azerbaijan was an international human rights case filed by the parents of Manvel Saribekyan - an Armenian national from the Ttujur village in the Gegharkunik province of Armenia, who died while in captivity in Azerbaijan in 2010. The judgment of the European Court of Human Rights on the case originated in an application (no. 35746/11) against the Republic of Azerbaijan lodged with the Court under the Convention for the Protection of Human Rights and Fundamental Freedoms on 10 June 2011.

The parents of Saribekyan alleged that their son was tortured and killed while in detention in Azerbaijan on the basis of ethnic hatred. On January 30, 2020, the Court ruled that Azerbaijan had violated Articles 2 and 3 of the Conversion (the right to life and the prohibition of torture), in the case of Manvel Saribekyan. The Court ordered the State of Azerbaijan to pay the parents of Manvel Saribekyan 60 thousand euros.

== Background ==
On September 11, 2010 a 20-years-old resident of the Armenian village of Ttujur bordering with Azerbaijan, Manvel Saribekyan, was captured by the Azerbaijani military near the Azerbaijani village of Zamanli. Saribekyan was accused of espionage and an attempt at a terrorist attack. In Armenia, Saribekyan's relatives said that in the morning of September 11, he had left the house to look for cattle and went missing.

The following day the Azerbaijani authorities released a video of an interrogation in which Saribekyan confessed to being a member of a sabotage group, which, after crossing the border of Azerbaijan, had intended to blow up a school in Zamanli village. In response, the Armenian Defense Ministry released a statement questioning the methods used by Azerbaijani authorities to obtain the confession, pointing to traces of torture seen on Saribekyan in the video.

On October 5, 2010, Manvel Saribekyan was found dead in his prison cell in Baku. The Azerbaijani authorities announced that he had committed suicide by hanging himself. The Armenian officials rejected the account of events given by Azerbaijan, the Armenian Foreign Minister Eduard Nalbandyan said: "The kidnapping of the young shepherd, making him speak obvious nonsense on TV through violence, and then killing him is terrible both in terms of the act and the degree of cynicism with which it was reported to the public. This way of acting is typical to terrorists: first abase a captive before a camera, then kill him".

On October 5, 2010, the Armenian delegation issued a statement to the Parliamentary Assembly of the Council of Europe signed by 26 members in which they strongly condemned the actions of the Azerbaijani authorities accusing them of violating articles two and three (unlawful execution and torture) of the European Convention on Human Rights, as well as the Geneva Conventions and other international laws.

Armenian officials also pointed out that representatives of the International Committee of the Red Cross, were denied access to Saribekyan while he was in custody, which was later confirmed by ICRC representative Ilaha Huseynova.

After Saribekyan's body was repatriated to Armenia on November 4, 2010 the Press Service of the Prosecutor General of Armenia informed that the forensic examination had revealed signs of torture on the body and opened a criminal investigation. The Armenian side sought legal assistance from Azerbaijan, but as no reply was received the investigation was suspended in December 2011.

== Trial at the European Court of Human Rights ==
Mamikon Saribekyan and Siranush Balyan filed a complaint with ECHR on 10 June 2011, in which they submitted that their son was tortured and killed while in detention in Azerbaijan, which violated Articles 2, 3, 13, 14 of the Convention for the Protection of Human Rights and Fundamental Freedoms.

On January 30, 2020, the Court issued judgment on the case Saribekyan and Balyan v. Azerbaijan and recognized that the State of Azerbaijan had violated Articles 2 and 3 (right to life and the prohibition on torture). The Court did not investigate the violation of Articles 13 and 14 concerning the right to effective protection and the prohibition of discrimination, while recognizing that Azerbaijan's investigation of Saribekyan's death was inadequate in many aspects, including the consideration of the possible role of ethnic hatred.

The Court ruled that Azerbaijan had to pay 60,000 (EUR) to Artush Petrosyan in respect of non-pecuniary damage, and in accordance with Article 44 § 2 of the Convention and 2,200 (EUR) in respect of costs and expenses.

One of the 7 judges on the case, the representative of Azerbaijan, Latif Huseynov, voted against the decision and expressed a dissenting opinion. In his opinion, the application should not have been considered, since the deadline of 6 months for filling an application was missed.

Azerbaijan appealed this decision to the Grand Chamber of the Court. The appeal was rejected.

== See also ==
- Karen Petrosyan v. Azerbaijan
- Sargsyan v. Azerbaijan
- Murder of Gurgen Margaryan
- Anti-Armenian sentiment in Azerbaijan
