= Benabderrahmane =

Benabderrahmane or Benabderahmane (Arabic: بن عبد الرحمان) is a surname. Notable people with the surname include:

- Aymen Benabderrahmane (born 1960), Algerian politician
- Farès Benabderahmane (born 1987), Algerian football player
- Tayeb Benabderrahmane (born 1981), Franco-Algerian consultant, public affairs actor, and human rights claimant

== See also ==
- Abd al-Rahman
