= Sargsyan v. Azerbaijan =

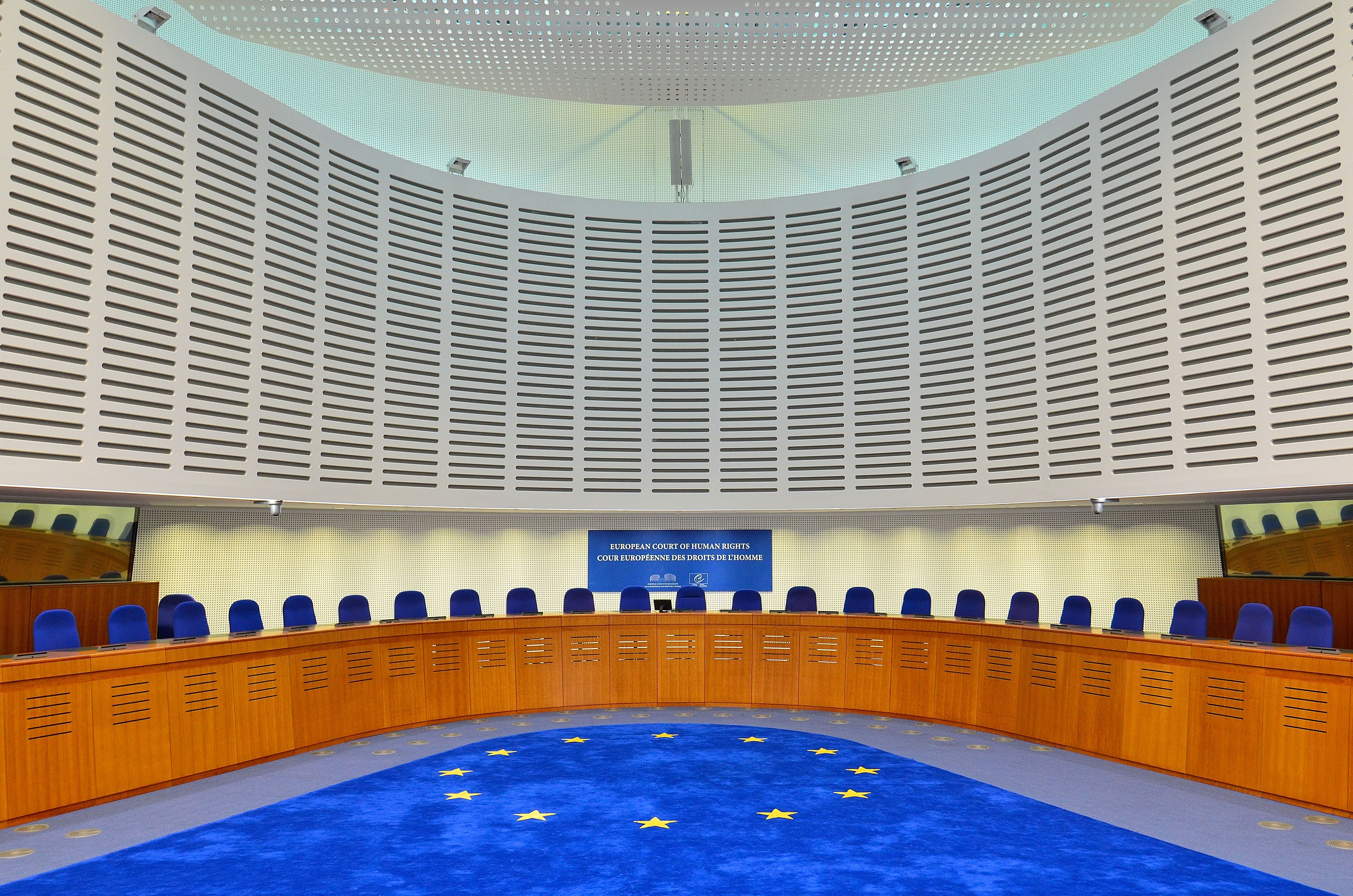
- Court: European Court of Human Rights
- Decided: 16 June 2015
- Citation: European Convention on Human Rights - Articles 1, 8, 13, 14, 26, 30, 34, 35, 36

Court membership
- Judges sitting: Dean Spielmann, President, Josep Casadevall, Guido Raimondi, Mark Villiger, Isabelle Berro, Ineta Ziemele, Boštjan M. Zupančič, Alvina Gyulumyan, Khanlar Hajiyev, George Nicolaou, Luis López Guerra, Ganna Yudkivska, Paulo Pinto de Albuquerque, Ksenija Turković, Egidijus Kūris, Robert Spano, Iulia Antoanella Motoc

Sargsyan v. Azerbaijan was an international human rights case regarding the rights of Armenian refugees displaced from former Soviet Azerbaijan because of the conflict in Nagorno-Karabakh. The judgment of the Grand Chamber of the European Court of Human Rights on the case originated in an application (no. 40167/06) against the Republic of Azerbaijan lodged with the Court under Article 34 of the Convention for the Protection of Human Rights and Fundamental Freedoms by Minas Sargsyan on 11 August 2006. He was forced to flee his home in the village of Gulistan in Shahumyan region of former Soviet Azerbaijan, together with his family, because of the Azerbaijani bombardments of the village and was not allowed to return and unable to get any compensation from the Azerbaijani authorities. Even though the applicant died in 2009, as did his widow, Lena Sargsyan, in 2014, his children, Vladimir and Tsovinar Sargsyan, represented him in court to continue the proceedings.

The court ruled in favour of the applicant on 16 June 2015, confirming that the Azerbaijani Government had failed to assist him to have his property rights restored and/or to obtain compensation and awarded him the sum of 5,000 euros for damages and EUR 30,000 in costs and expenses.

Sargsyan v. Azerbaijan, and a similar case, Chiragov and Others v. Armenia, were the first cases of civilians affected by the conflict, who attempted to obtain compensation for the harm caused to their life and livelihood by applying to the ECHR. The Grand Chamber issued judgments on both cases on the same day and in both cases ruled in favour of the applicants and against the respective governments. It also underlined the responsibility of Armenia and Azerbaijan to find a resolution to the Nagorno-Karabakh conflict.

== Background and context ==
Sargsyan and his family were among the ethnic Armenian population of the former Azerbaijan SSR displaced in the course of the hostilities over the contested breakaway republic of Nagorno-Karabakh in 1992, which included attempts at ethnic cleansing. The conflict and the ensuing war resulted in hundreds of thousands of internally displace people and refugees on both sides.

The Sargsyan v. Azerbaijan case was seen as a "landmark case" in establishing the rights of refugees against governments, since ECHR had not considered a situation like this before. Viewed through the lens of non-discrimination: "the lesson of the ECHR ruling must surely be that those like Mr Sargsyan must be respected as individuals, and that discrimination against them, because of ethnic origin or for any other reason, must be prevented."

Notably, the Court stated in its final judgment that: “The mere fact that peace negotiations are on-going [under the auspices of the OSCE] does not absolve the Government from taking other measures, especially when negotiations have been pending for such a long time.” It therefore called on the Azerbaijani government to establish a property claims mechanism for all displaced persons to have their property rights restored and/or to obtain compensation for the loss of those rights.

== Details of the case ==
Sargsyan claimed that he was forced to flee his home, together with his family, because of the Azerbaijani bombardments of his native village and that "the denial of his right to return to the village of Gulistan and to have access to his property there or to be compensated for its loss and the denial of access to his home and to the graves of his relatives in Gulistan amounted to continuing violations of Article 1 of Protocol No. 1 and of Article 8 of the Convention. Moreover, he alleged a violation of Article 13 of the Convention in that no effective remedy was available in respect to the above complaints. Finally, he alleged with a view to all complaints set out above, that he was subjected to discrimination on the basis of his ethnic origin and his religious affiliation in violation of Article 14 of the Convention".

The Court ruled that impossibility for Sargsyan to access his property and not providing any alternative measures to restore his rights by the Government to provide him with compensation had placed an excessive burden on him, hence resulting in a continuing violation of his rights under Article 1 of Protocol No. 1.

While the court accepted Azerbaijan's argument that refusing Sargsyan access to his house could have been due to safety considerations, it held that the Government of Azerbaijan had a duty to take alternative measures in order to secure property rights. It also underlined that the fact that peace negotiations were on-going did not free the State from its duty to take other measures, referring to the principle of non-discrimination laid down in Article 3 of the Pinheiro Principles forbidding discrimination between internally displaced Azerbaijanis and ethnic Armenian refugees.

The Court also concluded that impossibility for the applicant to access his home along with the cultural and religious attachment with his late relatives’ graves in Gulistan that he could not visit as the Government took no measures in order to address his rights or provide a compensation, had placed a disproportionate burden on him, thus resulting in a continuing violation of Article 8 of the convention.

Hence the Court ruled that Azerbaijan had failed to make any provisions to help or compensate Sarsyan in respect of his Convention complaints. Furthermore, the Court's findings under Article 1 of Protocol No. 1 and Article 8 of the Convention related to Azerbaijan's failure to create a mechanism for him to have his rights restored and to obtain compensation created a close link between the violations found under Article 1 and Article 8 on the one hand and the requirements of Article 13 on the other hand. It therefore concluded that there had also been a continuing breach of Article 13 of the convention.

Due to the exceptional nature of the case (ongoing conflict situation, difficulties in assessment of financial and non-financial damage, time aspects, etc) the Court's assessment of reasonable compensation in accordance with to Article 41 was not announced upon delivery of the judgement on 16 June 2015, but postponed to a later date. Despite the large number of unmeasurable factors in the case, on 12 December 2017 compensation was eventually awarded in the amount of 5,000 euros in respect of pecuniary and non-pecuniary damages and EUR 30,000 in costs and expenses.

== See also ==
- Karen Petrosyan v. Azerbaijan
- Saribekyan and Balyan v. Azerbaijan
- Murder of Gurgen Margaryan
- Anti-Armenian sentiment in Azerbaijan
