= Karen Petrosyan v. Azerbaijan =

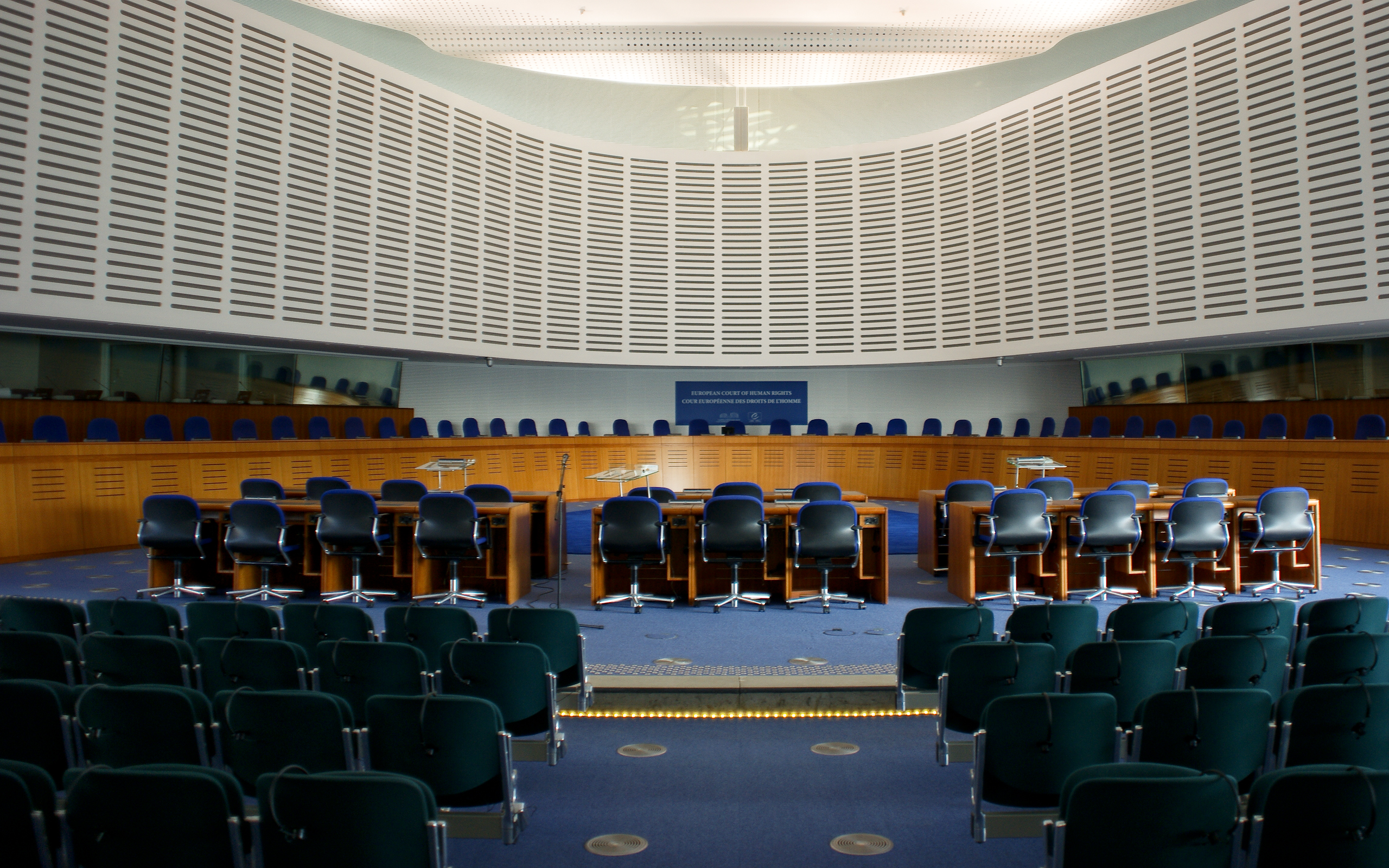
- Court: European Court of Human Rights
- Decided: 4 November 2021
- Citations: European Convention on Human Rights – Articles 2, 3, 5, 8, 13 and 14

Case history
- Prior action: Application no. 61737/14 lodged on 11 September 2014

Court membership
- Judges sitting: Síofra O’Leary – President, Mārtiņš Mits, Ganna Yudkivska, Lətif Hüseynov, Jovan Ilievski, Lado Chanturia, Arnfinn Bårdsen

Karen Petrosyan v. Azerbaijan was an international human rights case regarding the rights of Artush Petrosyan and his son Karen Petrosyan – an Armenian national from Chinari village, Tavush province of Armenia, who died while in captivity in Azerbaijan in 2014. The judgment of the European Court of Human Rights on the case originated in an application (no. 32427/16) against the Republic of Azerbaijan lodged with the Court under the Convention for the Protection of Human Rights and Fundamental Freedoms by the applicant, Artush Petrosyan, on 25 April 2016. He Submitted that his son had been publicly humiliated, tortured and killed by decapitation by Azerbaijani State agents and that "his son’s body had not been repatriated in a timely manner, that there had been no effective investigation on and that the alleged violations had occurred as a result of discrimination based on ethnic origin".

The Court issued judgment for the case on 4 November 2021 finding that it had been proven that Karen Petrosyan was subjected to torture. It also acknowledged the moral suffering endured by the applicant, hence concluding that there had been a violation of the Convention in respect of both the applicant and his son. It ruled that Azerbaijan had to pay 40,000 euros to Artush Petrosyan for mental suffering.

== Background ==
On 7 August 2014 Karen Petrosyan, a 31-year-old resident of Chinari Armenian village bordering with Azerbaijan crossed the border, reaching the neighbouring Azerbaijani village of Aghbulag, and was apprehended by the Azerbaijani military. Initially it was reported that he got lost while collecting firewood and accidentally crossed the border. Later the Armenian authorities started investigating the possibility of his kidnapping from the Armenian territory by the Azerbaijani forces.

On the same day, two video recordings of Petrosyan were broadcast by Azerbaijani media. The first one was an interview by Radio Liberty with a local resident of Aghbulag – Farida Tagiyeva, the first person Petrosyan met after crossing the border, where she tells how Petrosyan had approached her and that he was unarmed and in civilian clothing. An amateur video then showed Petrosyan being offered tea by the villagers and answering their questions in Russian. In the second recording, the same Petrosyan appeared dressed in military uniform, being interrogated by a senior military officer while on his knees, with his hands cuffed and restrained by soldiers. Azerbaijani authorities accused him of being a "saboteur" and "having killed civilians, inciting hatred and causing aggression". He was pronounced dead the following day as Azerbaijan claimed that he had died of heart failure.

In response the State Commission for Prisoners of War, Hostages and Missing Persons of Armenia issued a statement demanding an international expertise of Karen Petrosyan's body, pointing out that his "sudden death under unknown circumstances gives rise to a reasonable suspicion of cruel and inhumane attitude towards him" On 25 August 2014 the Human Rights Defender of Armenia sent another letter to UN High Commissioner for Human Rights, stating that "It has been 17 days since Karen Petrosyan’s murder, and the Azerbaijani side has still not returned Petrosyan’s body. I have substantial doubts and concern that the delay of returning Petrosyan’s body aims to conceal the evidence of torture".

The body of Karen Petrosyan was repatriated 2 months after his death, on 10 October 2014, in an operation facilitated by the International Committee of the Red Cross. The Armenian authorities declared that "After the forensic examination, Armenia will raise at international institutions the issue on giving legal evaluation to the matter."

A number of OSCE participating states expressed their concern over this case.The U.S. Department of State in particular "called on the Government of Azerbaijan to conduct a full and transparent investigation into this incident and to make its findings public". In response the Azerbaijani authorities blamed the US State department of "double standards" and "discrimination" against Azerbaijan.

In an interview with the Armenian "Lurer" agency, the lawyer of the applicant, Kristina Gevorgyan, said "Azerbaijani authorities provided the media with shocking images of masked soldiers dragging Petrosyan away and forcing him to apologize to the President of Azerbaijan. There is evidence that Karen Petrosyan was kept isolated from the outside world by the Azerbaijani military after his arrest, after which he was subjected to torture and ill-treatment by the Azerbaijani authorities or their agents, including public humiliation".

== Trial at the European Court of Human Rights ==
The first application (no. 61737/14) was lodged on 11 September 2014, when Karen Petrosyan's body was still held in Azerbaijan, requesting that Rule 39 be applied and Azerbaijan be ordered to return it immediately to prevent damage to the corpse. On 30 September 2014 the Court denied the request to apply an interim measure against but requested the State of Azerbaijan to provide explanations and reasons for the delay.

After the repatriation of the body and its forensic examination a new application (no. 32427/16) was filed with ECHR by the lawyers of Artush Petrosyan in April 2016 (alleging violation of Article 2, 3, 5, 8, 13 and article 14 in conjunction with articles 2 and 3), stating that Karen Petrosyan had been tortured and executed by decapitation. It also submitted that Artush Petrosyan's rights had been violated because of the way he learnt about his son's death, the surrounding circumstances and the significant delay in the return of the body.

The Court issued judgment for the case Karen Petrosyan v. Azerbaijan on 4 November 2021, pronouncing the State of Azerbaijani guilty of the breach of articles 2 and 3 (violations of the right to life and the prohibition of torture, incomplete investigation and delayed return of the body. It also acknowledged the moral suffering endured by the father, thus concluding that there had been a violation of Article 3 of the Convention also in respect of the applicant.

The Court did not investigate the violation of Articles 5, 8, 13 and 14 (right to liberty and security, respect for private and family life, effective protection and the prohibition of discrimination), while it recognized that ethnic hatred was a possible consideration and that Azerbaijani authorities should have carried out an investigation in this regard and not doing so constituted a procedural failure, hence finding a violation of the Article 2.

The Court ruled that Azerbaijan had to pay 40,000 (EUR) to Artush Petrosyan in respect of non-pecuniary damage, in accordance with Article 44 § 2 of the Convention.

== See also ==
- Saribekyan and Balyan v. Azerbaijan
- Sargsyan v. Azerbaijan
- Murder of Gurgen Margaryan
- Anti-Armenian sentiment in Azerbaijan
