= Chiragov and Others v. Armenia =

International human rights case

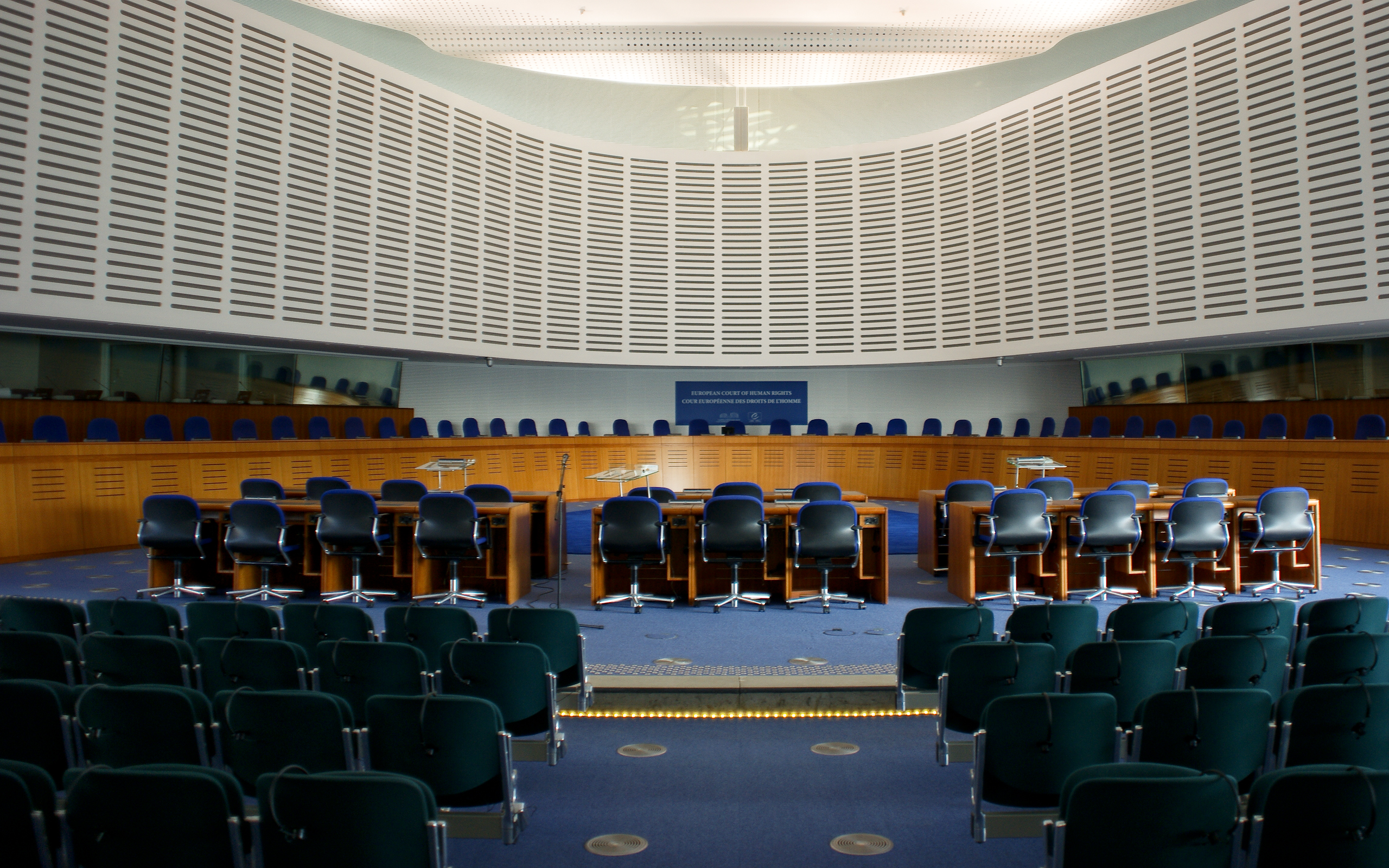
European Court of Human Rights

Chiragov v. Armenia was an international human rights case regarding the rights to property of Azeri nationals in the Nagorno-Karabakh region of former Soviet Azerbaijan. The judgment of the Grand Chamber of the European Court of Human Rights on the case originated in an application (no. 13216/05) against the Republic of Armenia lodged with the Court under Article 34 of the Convention for the Protection of Human Rights and Fundamental Freedoms by six Azerbaijani nationals on 6 April 2005. The applicants alleged, in particular, that they were prevented from returning to the district of Lachin in territory occupied by the respondent Government, that they were thus unable to enjoy their property and homes located there, and that they had not received any compensation for their losses.

Chiragov and others v. Armenia, and a similar case, Sargsyan v. Azerbaijan, were the first cases of civilians affected by the conflict, who attempted to obtain compensation for the harm caused to their life and livelihood by applying to the ECHR. The Grand Chamber issued judgments on both cases on the same day and in both cases ruled in favour of the applicants and against the respective governments. It also underlined the responsibility of Armenia and Azerbaijan to find a resolution to the Nagorno-Karabakh conflict.

== Introduction ==
The applicants have said that they belong to the Azerbaijani Kurdish ethnicity. They have lived in the district of Lachin until the Armenian occupation. They have stated that they have been forced to leave their land, and to flee to Baku. There have been 6 applicants in the case: 1. Mr Elkhan Chiragov; 2. Mr Adishirin Chiragov; 3. Mr Ramiz Gebrayilov; 4. Mr Akif Hasanof; 5. Mr Fekhreddin Pashayev; 6. Mr Qaraca Gabrayilov.

The applicants asserted that they could not access to their individual properties located in the district of Lachin occupied by the respondent Government (Armenia). They further stated that the respondent Government prevents them to return to their home, and did not ensure any compensation for their losses. They interpreted these actions of the Government as continuing violations of Article 1 of Protocol 1 ("protection of property") to the Convention, Articles 8 ("right to respect for private and family life"), 13 ("right to an effective remedy"), and 14 ("prohibition of discrimination") of the Convention.

The Azerbaijani Government asked to intervene in the proceedings under Article 36 (1) ("third party intervention") of the Convention. The right of the Azerbaijani Government to intervene in the case as a third party has been satisfied by the Court, and Mr. C. Asgarov, Agent of the Government, represented the Azerbaijani Government during the proceedings.

== Proofs of Applicants ==
The applicants claimed that the Armenian Government occupied the territories of Azerbaijan, and therefore, the Government is responsible for the violation of their rights. They submitted the following proofs:

1. The reports of documents of the Human Rights Watch (HRW) affirms that the military forces of the Republic of Armenia involved in the occupation of Nagorno-Karabakh and the surrounding territories. The HRW stated that Armenian army troop in the Nagorno-Karabakh conflict, and this made Armenia a party of the conflict. Therefore, the conflict is an international armed conflict between Armenia and Azerbaijan under international law.
2. The official statements by various authorities confirm that Armenia occupied the Nagorno-Karabakh and surrounding territories. For example, Mr Robert Kocharyan, former President and Prime Minister of Armenia, and "NKR," said that Armenia supplied anti-aircraft weapons to Nagorno-Karabakh while interviewing with the Armenian newspaper "Golos Armenii" in February 1994. Additionally, Mr Vazgen Manukyan, former Armenian Minister of Defence, admitted that statements that Armenia not to participate in the war are for foreign consumption, not true while interviewing with British journalist and writer Thomas de Waal in October 2000.
3. The annual reports of the International Institute for Strategic Studies repeatedly revealed that most of the military personnel present in Nagorno-Karabakh is from Armenia, and "Armenia has controlled most of Nagorno-Karabakh, and also seven adjacent regions of Azerbaijan."
4. Mr David Atkinson, rapporteur of the Parliamentary Assembly of the Council of Europe, indicated in his report that individuals living in Nagorno-Karabakh have passports of Armenia, soldiers from Armenia have been stationed in the region and they have been fighting. Mr Rapporteur further stated that the Armenian Government transfers great financial resources to this area. Based on the report, Parliamentary Assembly adopted the resolution 1416 on 25 January 2005. The Assembly affirmed that Nagorno-Karabakh has been occupied by Armenia, and this means that Armenia has violated its obligations as a member of the Council of Europe. The Assembly affirmed "the right of displaced persons to return their homes safely and with dignity."
5. Mr Vartan Oskanyan, former foreign minister of Armenia, stated that Armenia controls the occupied territories while interviewing with the Austrian newspaper "Der Standard."
6. United Nations General Assembly approved a resolution on "The Situation in the occupied territories of Azerbaijan" (A/Res/62/243). The Assembly recalled and reminded four binding resolution of the United Nations Security Council, and requested all Armenian forces to withdraw from all occupied territories of Azerbaijan. The Assembly affirmed the inalienable right of the persons displaced from the occupied territories to return to their homes.
7. On 29 October 2008, Mr Jirayr Sefilyan, Armenian military commander and political figure, stated that armed forces in Nagorno Karabakh, and politicians in the region are sent by the central Armenian Government, and budget of the territory is financed by Armenia while interviewing with Armenia Today.
8. On 20 May 2010 the European Parliament adopted a Resolution on the need for an EU strategy for the South Caucasus. The Parliament demanded the withdrawal of Armenian forces from all occupied territories of Azerbaijan. In April 2012 the European Parliament approved another Resolution and expressed its deep concerns about "illegal activities exercised by Armenian troops on the occupied Azerbaijani territories."

== Responses of the Government ==
1. The Armenian Government alleged that only 5 percent of the "NKR" defense forces is deployed by Armenia pursuant to Article 4 of the 1994 agreement. Additionally, the Government did not exclude the possibility that persons belong to Armenian nationality may serve in the "NKR" defense force on a contractual and voluntary basis.
2. The Government asserted that "NKR" has its own judicial system, president, government, courts, parliament, and laws. Therefore, Armenia is not responsible for the violation of human rights in "NKR."
3. The Government stated that the laws of Armenia, and "NKR" allow dual citizenship, and passports of Armenia are issued to "NKR" residents because of their travel to foreign countries.
4. Armenia claimed that several currencies are used in "NKR" such as euros, US dollars, pounds, and Australian dollars, and therefore, Armenian dram is not main currency in the territory.

== Result ==
The Strasbourg Court ruled that Armenia exercises effective control over Nagorno-Karabakh and the surrounding territories, including the district of Lachin. The Court dismissed preliminary objections of Armenia based on the grounds of jurisdiction, the applicants' victim status, and non-exhaustion of domestic remedies. The Court rendered a judgement that Armenia has been continuing to violate Article 1 (Protection of property) of the Protocol No. 1 to the European Convention on Human Rights, Article 8 (Right to respect for private and family life) and Article 13 (Right to an effective remedy) of the Convention. Armenia was ordered to pay 5,000 euros in respect of pecuniary and non-pecuniary damage to each of the applicants and a total amount of 28,642.87 pounds sterling for costs and expenses.

According to Laurence Broers, Research Associate at the SOAS Centre of Contemporary Central Asia and the Caucasus, through its ruling, the European Court of Human Rights acknowledged the ambivalence of the NKR's claim to a separate sovereignty. It found that Armenia effectively exercised extra-territorial jurisdiction sustaining the situation in Karabakh, overturning Armenia's arguments to the contrary and effectively affirming Azerbaijan's narrative of Armenia as an occupying power.
