= Bin Samikh Tower =

- Location within Doha

General information
- Type: Hotel, residence, restaurant
- Location: Doha, Qatar
- Coordinates: 25°19′42″N 51°31′59″E
- Construction started: 2007
- Completed: 2014

Height
- Architectural: 157 m (515 ft)

Technical details
- Floor count: 42

Bin Samikh is a skyscraper located in Doha, Qatar, which opened in 2014.

== Background ==
Ali bin Samikh Al Marri is a Qatari human rights figure and politician, chairman of the National Commission on Human Rights. He is also the CEO of Tamniyat Qatar Real Estate Investment (itself owned by Grand Heritage International), the company in charge of building the tower. Bin Samikh Holding, which combines the assets of Ali bin Samikh al-Marri, operates in the construction and real estate management sectors according to the rules imposed by Sharia law.

Construction of the Bin Samikh Tower began in 2007 and was completed in 2014.

== Description ==
The construction of the tower, which was originally called the Swiss Deluxe Grand Hotel, required a budget of $150 million. The tower has 24 luxury hotel rooms, 170 residential apartments, 234 rooms, 192 apartments, and 4 restaurants. The hotels and apartments are managed by the Swiss companies Swiss luxury hotel management group and Swiss-Attixs International Hotels Group (SAIH).
