= Yalqun Rozi =

Uyghur author and scholar (born 1966)

Yalqun Rozi (Chinese: 牙里坤·肉孜; pinyin: Yálǐkūn Ròuzī; Uyghur: يالقۇن روزى; born 4 March 1966 in Artush) is a Uyghur author, scholar, literary critic and a former senior editor of Xinjiang Education Publishing House, who headed the committee to compile the publisher's Uyghur textbooks from 2001. He was arrested by Xinjiang authorities in October 2016, in what was considered the first wave of intellectuals to be detained after Chen Quanguo became party secretary of the Xinjiang Uyghur Autonomous Region (XUAR). According to Chinese state media, Yalqun was charged, along with five other Uyghur officials, with attempting to "split the country". In 2018, he received a 15-year jail term for the charge of "inciting subversion of state power". A short video featuring Yalqun was aired by state broadcaster CGTN on 2 April 2021. His U.S.-based son Kamaltürk Yalqun told Radio Free Asia that the textbooks on whose content Yalqun's conviction was based had passed multiple regular reviews by authorities, and only been identified as problematic after Chen became party secretary in the XUAR. In 2022, after petitioning by Yalqun's daughter Tumaris Yalqun, the Working Group on Arbitrary Detention (WGAD) ruled that the detention of Yalqun was arbitrary.
