= Georgii Logvynskyi =

Ukrainian politician

Georgii Logvynskyi Георгій Логвинський
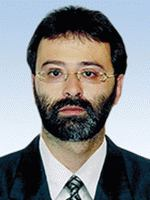

Personal details
- Born: August 3, 1978 (age 48)
- Party: People's Front (2014–)
- Occupation: member of the Ukrainian Parliament (Verkhovna Rada of Ukraine) of the VIII convocation and Chairman of the Interparliamentary Relations Group; Vice-President of the Parliamentary Assembly of the Council of Europe in 2017–2018, Vice-President of the European People's Party in the Council of Europe in 2015-2019, Honoured Lawyer of Ukraine, and human rights activist. He has the diplomatic rank of Ambassador Extraordinary and Plenipotentiary. Doctor of Philosophy in Law (Ph.D.)
- Profession: politician
- Website: rada.gov.ua

Georgii Logvynskyi (Ukrainian: Гео́ргій Логви́нський; born August 3, 1978) is a member of the Ukrainian Parliament (Verkhovna Rada) of the VIII convocation and chairman of the Interparliamentary Relations Group; vice-president of the Parliamentary Assembly of the Council of Europe (2017–18); vice-president of the European People's Party in the Council of Europe in 2015-2019, Honoured Lawyer of Ukraine, and human rights activist. He has the diplomatic rank of Ambassador Extraordinary and Plenipotentiary. Doctor of Philosophy in Law (Ph.D.).

== Biography ==
On January 3, 2017, Georgii Logvynskyi was elected a vice president of the Parliamentary Assembly of the Council of Europe.

In January 2017, Logvynskyi was also elected a chairman of the PACE Sub-committee on Crime Problems and Counter-Terrorism. Logvynskyi's was re-elected on January 23, 2018.

On January 22, 2018, Logvynskyi was elected a representative of the Committee on Legal Affairs and Human Rights of the Parliamentary Assembly to GRECO (Group of States Against Corruption).

In January 2019, Logvynskyi was elected vice-president of the PACE Committee on Legal Affairs and Human Rights.

Since 2015, Logvynskyi has been vice-president of the European People's Party in the Council of Europe – the largest political group in the PACE. In January 2018, Logvynskyi was elected vice-president of the European People's Party in the Council of Europe for the third time and held this position until the end of his term. In December 2017, he was appointed a PACE rapporteur for the report entitled "Principles and guarantees of advocacy". This report was intended to raise the most urgent issues of advocacy in the member states of the Council of Europe, and to provide specific recommendations for strengthening the guarantees for lawyers and the protection of their rights.

In 2014, Logvynskyi became a Member of Ukrainian Parliament (People's Deputy of Ukraine). He was number 37 in the electoral list of the political party People's Front under a quota of the Mejlis of the Crimean Tatar People. In the Verkhovna Rada of Ukraine, he held the positions of the deputy chairman of the Committee on Human Rights, National Minorities and International Relations, and chairman of the Sub-committee on International Legal Affairs and Internally Displaced Persons.

Georgii Logvynskyi works as a human rights defender. As an attorney and a member of Kyiv regional bar association, he represented clients in civil and criminal high-profile cases. He defended, in particular, persons who were requested to be extradited to Russia as a result of politically motivated criminal prosecutions against them.

Since 2005, Logvynskyi has worked as a consultant to the People's Deputy of Ukraine Mustafa Dzhemilyov and as an adviser to the Congress of National Communities of Ukraine and the Crimean Tatar People's Majlis on international legal issues. He also collaborated with the Ukrainian Helsinki Human Rights Union, the Kharkiv Human Rights Group, the Institute for Religious Freedom and other NGOs.

As a businessman, he started his activity in 1996, having established a consulting company and cooperating, in particular, with General Electric, Euroshop-Switzerland and other international companies. He later founded an international consortium with the companies in Poland, the United Kingdom and Germany to provide consulting services to foreign investors and Ukrainian companies on foreign economic activity, including tolling. The consortium worked, among others, with the state programs of Poland and Germany: Warszawska Giełda Towarowa (Warsaw Commodity Exchange), Agencja Rynku Rolnego (Agricultural Market Agency) and others

Logvynskyi graduated from National Academy of Internal Affairs of Ukraine with a degree in law. In his post-graduate period at the academy, he worked on a research in the field of "Criminal and legal protection of foreign economic activity in Ukraine."

In 2021 he defended his thesis on the topic: "Criminal-legal characteristics of an offence against a defender or representative of the person", and obtained a degree of Doctor of Philosophy in Law.

Since the beginning of the Russian invasion of Ukraine in 2022, Logvynskyi, with the support of the Israeli Embassy in Ukraine, with the participation of the National Police of Ukraine and the State Border Guard Service of Ukraine, has launched an evacuation project from the whole territory of Ukraine. During this period, he managed to evacuate more than 16,000 people. The project created medical buses, which allowed continuous treatment of the seriously injured while evacuating from more dangerous areas in Ukraine.

Logvynskyi speaks Ukrainian, English, Russian, Polish, German and Hebrew.

== Parliamentary activities ==
In 2014, Logvynskyi became a Member of Ukrainian Parliament (People's Depute of Ukraine). He held positions of the vice-chairperson of the Committee on Human Rights, Ethnic Minorities and Inter-ethnic relations and chairman of the Subcommittee on International Legal Affairs and Internally Displaced Persons.

Logvynskyi was the driving force for the Law of Ukraine "On Securing the Rights and Freedoms of Citizens and the Legal Regime on the Temporarily Occupied Territory of Ukraine".

Logvynskyi is a co-author of the numerous addresses of the Verkhovna Rada of Ukraine to the international organisations, parliamentary assemblies, foreign governments and world leaders as to human rights violations in the Autonomous Republic of Crimea, condemning violations of rights and freedoms of the Crimean Tatar people.

In 2015, Logvynskyi was elected a chairman of the Inter-Fractional Association of Members of the Parliament, Advocacy of Ukraine.

On April 9, 2015, he voted in favor of recognizing the status of fighters for the independence of Ukraine in the 20th century of all nationalist formations, including those participating in the occupation of modern Ukrainian lands on the side of the German Empire and the Third Reich.

On March 29, 2018, Logvynskyi was chosen as the winner of the "Best GR Specialist of the Year" award in the nomination "The Best International Case".

In December 2018, Logvynskyi voted for a resolution of the Verkhovna Rada about memorable dates and anniversaries that Ukraine will celebrate in 2019 at the state level, in particular the 110th anniversary of the organizer of Jewish pogroms in Western Ukraine, OUN activist Ivan Klymiv.

In 2021, the Ukrainian Association of Government Relations Professionals and Lobbyists awarded Logvynskyi the IV All-Ukrainian GR-Prize 2021 for his achievements in the field of GR.

== International activities ==
Logvynskyi was the vice-president of the Parliamentary Assembly of the Council of Europe in 2017–2018 – the highest position in the international parliamentary arena in the history of Ukraine.

On January 3, 2017, Logvynskyi was elected a chairman of the Sub-Committee on Crime Problems and the Fight against Terrorism of the PACE. He was subsequently re-elected for this position. As of January 2019, Logvynskyi served as vice-president of the Committee on Legal Affairs and Human Rights of the Parliamentary Assembly of the Council of Europe.

Logvynskyi was involved in creating resolutions, amendments and proposals of the PACE, which applied and extended sanctions against the Russian Federation, condemned the annexation of Crimea and occupation of Donbas, and called for a release of political prisoners.

Logvynskyi was a head of the Verkhovna Rada’s Group on Inter-Parliamentary Relations with a State of Israel. In December 2021, during the Israeli Innovation Summit, Logvynskyi was mentioned among the “Key 30 Founders of Israeli-Ukrainian Change” for his contribution to the nations' partnership.

== Human rights activities ==
Logvynskyi began his human rights activities in 1996. He is a lawyer and a member of the Kyiv Regional Bar association. He chairs the board of trustees of the Congress of National Communities.

Logvynskyi was recognised the "Lawyer of the Year 2016" in the nomination "For significant contribution to the development of the Ukrainian Bar" as a result of the contest organised by the Ukrainian Bar Association. Subsequently, he was recognised the Lawyer of the Year 2018 in the nomination "Best Lawyer", the "Lawyer of the Year 2019" in the nomination "The best lawyer- defender of the rights of lawyers at the international level", and the "Lawyer of the Year 2020" in the nomination "For contribution to the development of international standards of anti-corruption justice in Ukraine".

In 2021, Logvynskyi was awarded the highest award of the National Association of Advocates of Ukraine - the Medal of NAAU "The Outstanding Advocate of Ukraine".

Logvynskyi was awarded the "Attorney of the Year 2016" in nomination "For strong contribution to the development of the Ukrainian advocacy" as a result of the contest conducted by the Ukrainian Bar Association.

Logvynskyi was awarded the honorary title of "Honored Lawyer of Ukraine" by the Decree of the President of Ukraine of 2016 № 533/2016.

Logvynskyi created the Ministry of Justice Expert Council with other lawyers and human rights activists after the beginning of the Russo-Ukrainian War in 2014. It consists of the representatives of well-known Ukrainian law-firm "Baker & McKenzie", "Integrites", "Vasil Kisil and Partners", "Аsters", "Astapow Lawyers", "Sayenko Kharenko" and others. By a unanimous decision of the members of the Expert Council, Logvynskyi was elected its chairperson and appointed as the adviser to the Minister of Justice of Ukraine. Under the chairmanship of Logvynskyi, the Council collected evidence that allowed to open more than 1,000 criminal proceedings, to seize the key marine vessels, and to issue notices of suspicion of treason to hundreds of Crimean prosecutors, judges and other officials.

Georgii Logvynskyi leads a group of lawyers who provide legal assistance to political prisoners; he also coordinates a work of lawyers and human rights defenders in the occupied territories.

The Nomination Committee of the Kyiv Region Bar Council awarded Logvynskyi the Honorary Prize "For Professionalism, Skill and Wisdom".

In December 2017, the Kyiv Regional Bar Council awarded Georgii Logvynskyi the honorary title of the “Knight of the Bar” for his contribution to the development of the legal profession in Ukraine.
