= Sheikha Maha Mansour al-Thani =

Qatari judge

Judge
- Incumbent
- Assumed office March 2010

Sheikha Maha Mansour Salman Jasim Al Thani is a Qatari judge.

Her appointment in March 2010 made her Qatar's first female judge. In 2013, she was listed sixth on CEO Middle East’s list of 100 most powerful Arab women.
