= Tayeb Benabderrahmane =

Franco-Algerian consultant (born 1981)

Tayeb Benabderrahmane (born 1981) is a Franco-Algerian consultant, public affairs actor, and human rights claimant. He is known for a prolonged detention in Qatar (2020), a subsequent arbitration case at the International Centre for Settlement of Investment Disputes (ICSID), and a 2025 decision by the UN Working Group on Arbitrary Detention determining that the deprivation of his liberty was arbitrary.

== Career ==
Benabderrahmane served as a general adviser to Dr. Ali bin Samikh Al-Marri, then chairman of Qatar's National Human Rights Committee (NHRC), where he oversaw external relations and advocacy initiatives. His tenure involved work on anti-corruption campaigns and investigating alleged embezzlement.

== Arbitrary detention in Qatar and resultant legal proceedings ==
=== The incident ===
==== Arbitrary arrest, detention and torture ====
Benabderrahmane allegedly possessed or controlled documents and electronic files that Qatar considered politically or commercially sensitive, particularly in the context of issues relating to Paris Saint-Germain (PSG) and the 2022 FIFA World Cup.

On 13 January 2020, Benabderrahmane was arrested in Doha by Qatari security forces. According to a later United Nations Working Group on Arbitrary Detention (WGAD) opinion, he was taken from his residence, had his electronic devices and documents seized, and was held incommunicado for several weeks without access to a lawyer, interpreter, or consular support. He alleges that he was held in secret detention for 19 days, during which he was subjected to physical and psychological torture, including sleep deprivation and extreme physical constraints.

After the initial prison confinement, he was placed under house arrest (effectively in a hotel) and, in July 2020, forced to sign a confidentiality or settlement agreement under duress. That agreement reportedly required him to surrender the documents and electronic files that Qatari authorities deemed sensitive. Following the forced agreement, he was released and deported from Qatar to France in late 2020.

==== Death sentence in absentia ====
In 2022, After his return to France, Benabderrahmane initiated criminal proceedings in the French courts, filing a complaint as a civil party for kidnapping, unlawful detention, torture, and extortion in an organized group. In a parallel development, the Qatar Criminal Court sentenced Benabderrahmane to death in absentia on May 31, 2023, on charges of espionage. The existence of this sentence was reportedly only revealed publicly in November 2023, although Qatari authorities had formally informed French authorities in July 2023. Benabderrahmane contends he was never informed of the existence of the criminal proceedings or the death sentence pronounced against him.

=== Legal proceedings ===
==== French investigations and complaints ====
After returning to France, Benabderrahmane filed a criminal complaint against Nasser Al-Khelaïfi, Qatari president of Paris Saint-Germain (PSG), alleging kidnapping, unlawful confinement, torture, and extortion in relation to his arrest and detention in Qatar in 2020. In 2023, French law enforcement conducted raids in Paris, including searches at the offices of legal advisors and at the town hall of the 7th arrondissement (then headed by Rachida Dati). In July 2023, the Paris residence of Paris Saint-Germain president Nasser Al-Khelaïfi was also searched in relation to the investigations. Al-Khelaifi denies the accusations and has himself filed a complaint.

==== ICSID Arbitration ====
In 2022, Benabderrahmane initiated investment arbitration proceedings against the State of Qatar under the 1996 France–Qatar Bilateral Investment Treaty (BIT). The case was registered as ICSID Case.

Following the revelation of his death sentence, Benabderrahmane submitted an application for provisional measures and temporary relief to the ICSID tribunal on November 3, 2023. The application sought an order for Qatar to refrain from any conduct that could harm the life and safety of the claimant, his relatives, or other individuals related to the arbitration.

In Procedural Order No. 3, the tribunal ordered Qatar to produce internal documents and records concerning his arrest, search warrants, interrogations, and detention measures records that had never been handed over to him at the time of his detention. The tribunal treated such documents as material to assessing alleged breaches of fair and equitable treatment obligations under the BIT.

As of 2025, the arbitration remains ongoing, with further orders being issued on procedural and substantive matters.

==== United Nations Working Group on Arbitrary Detention ====
On April 8, 2025, the United Nations Working Group on Arbitrary Detention (WGAD) adopted Opinion No. 28/2025. The WGAD concluded that Benabderrahmane's deprivation of liberty was arbitrary, citing three categories of violation: the deprivation of liberty was impossible to justify by invoking any legal basis; the deprivation of liberty was due to the exercise of the right to freedom of expression and opinion; and grave violations of the right to a fair trial were committed, accompanied by acts of torture and inhuman treatment.

The WGAD called upon the Government of Qatar to conduct an independent investigation, prosecute those responsible, provide full reparation, and compensate Benabderrahmane.
