= Ganna Yudkivska =

Ukrainian lawyer and judge

Ganna (Anna) Yudkivska
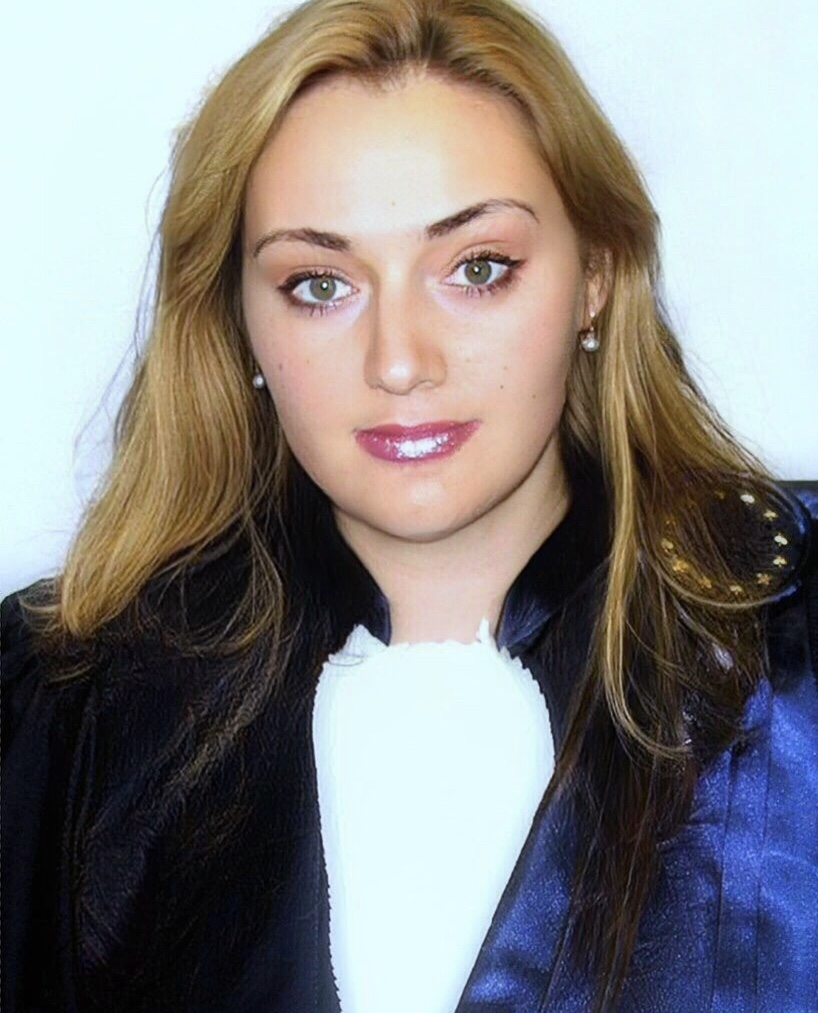

Judge of the European Court of Human Rights in respect of Ukraine
- In office 15 June 2010 – 26 June 2022
- Preceded by: Volodymyr Butkevych

Personal details
- Born: Kyiv, Ukraine
- Education: Taras Shevchenko National University of Kyiv

Ganna (Anna) Yuriyivna Yudkivska (Ukrainian: Ганна Юріївна Юдківська, romanized: Hanna Yuriyivna Yudkivs'ka) is a Ukrainian lawyer and judge. She was the judge of the European Court of Human Rights in respect of Ukraine in 2010–2022. She is a Member of the United Nations Working Group on Arbitrary Detention.

== Early life ==
She was born in Kyiv. Yudkivska graduated from the Law Faculties of the Taras Shevchenko National University of Kyiv (Ukraine) and Robert Schuman University (Université Strasbourg III) (France). She has her PhD diploma from the Academy of Advocacy of Ukraine.

In 1999, she attended the Human Rights school of the Helsinki Committee for Human Rights in Warsaw (Poland) and in 2004 a specialized formation in litigation in Human Rights by the Netherlands Helsinki Committee for Human Rights and Interrights in Soesterberg (Netherlands).

== Career ==
Yudkivska was a defense attorney and member of the Bar; she served as an expert for human rights organizations; she led in Ukraine and Moldova Steven Spielberg's legacy project on genocide studies, USC Shoah Foundation, (now Shoah Institute of the University of South California). She worked as a lawyer at the Registry of the ECtHR and advisor to the Commissioner for Human Rights of the Council of Europe.

In 2010, Yudkivska was elected a judge of the European Court of Human Rights (ECHR). In 2015–2016 she served as vice-president of Section V of the Court. In 2017 she became President of Section IV of the Court. Her term ended in 2022. As a judge of the ECHR, she was cited in an NGO report as she seated in four cases where a Helsinki Committee NGO was an applicant and four others where it was a third party involved. This could pose the question of a possible conflict of interest.

Yudkivska is a professor of European and International law at the Academy of Advocacy of Ukraine. She has lectured and researched at universities in the US, France, the Netherlands, Israel and Ukraine. She has authored scientific articles on human rights, international law and criminal procedure.

Yudkivska is a member of the Board of the European Society of International Law.

== Personal life ==
Ganna Yudkivska's husband is Ukrainian politician, Georgii Logvynskyi, and they have a son and a daughter.

== Selected publications ==
- “Between Scylla and Charybdis–Judicial Independence and Accountability in the Populist Era". (in: “Procès équitable : perspectives régionales et internationales / Fair Trial : Regional and International Perspectives: Liber amicorum Linos-Alexandre Sicilianos, Anthemis, 2020).
- “European Court of Human Rights at the time of global contemporary challenges to the human rights protection systems”.(in: Intersecting Views on National and International Human Rights Protection: Liber Amicorum Guido Raimondi, Wolf Legal Publishers, 2019).
- “Territorial Jurisdiction and Positive Obligations of an Occupied State: Some Reflections on Evolving Issues Under Article 1 of the European Convention”. (in: Anne van Aaken/Iulia Motoc (eds), The ECHR and General International Law, Oxford University Press, 2018).
- “The Use of Provisional/Interim Measures by International Courts in Cases of Mass Human Rights Violations: Comparative Analyses of ICJ, UNHRC, IACtHR and ECtHR Practice.” (Revista do Instituto Brasileiro de Direitos Humanos (2018), volume 17).
- “Ukraine on the way to democracy: role and achievements of the European Court of Human Rights”. (in I. Motoc, I. Ziemele (eds.), The Impact of the ECHR on Democratic Change in Central and Eastern Europe: Judicial Perspectives, Cambridge University Press, 2016).
- “Hate Speech”. (in S. Zayets, R. Martynovskyy, D. Svyrydova (eds.), Crimea Beyond Rules. Thematic review of the human rights situation under occupation. – Vol. 4., Kyiv, 2017)
- “Admissibility of evidence as a guarantee of a fair trial under Article 6 of the ECHR”. (in: “Human Rights. Case-Law of the European Court of Human Rights” No. 12 (93), Moscow, Russia, 2014).
- “Review of general guarantees of a fair trial – Paragraph 1 of Article 6 of the European Convention for the Protection of Human Rights and Fundamental Freedoms”. (In: Collection "European Court of Human Rights. Judicial practice", Book 1, Kyiv, 2013).
- Bushchenko A., Yudkivska, G. “European Convention on Human Rights in the lawyers’ practice * training manual for practicing lawyers”, Kyiv, 2010.
