= National Human Rights Committee (Qatar) =

Human rights commission in Doha, Qatar

- اللجنة الوطنية لحقوق الإنسان
- Formation: 2002
- Purpose: Defense of human rights
- Location: Doha, Qatar
- Website: www.nhrc-qa.org

The National Human Rights Committee (NHRC; Arabic: اللجنة الوطنية لحقوق الإنسان) is a government-appointed human rights commission based in Qatar. Established in 2002, its main purpose is to "act as an advisory body to the government on the promotion of human rights and to respond to individual complaints concerning human rights abuses".

== History ==
National Human Rights Committee building

The National Human Rights Committee was founded in 2002 by Emir Hamad bin Khalifa Al Thani by Decree No. 38 of that year, with its main purpose being to "act as an advisory body to the government on the promotion of human rights and to respond to individual complaints concerning human rights abuses".

In 2009, the NHRC was first accredited by the United Nations' Global Alliance of National Human Rights Institutions (GANHRI) with "A status", meaning formal compliance with the Paris Principles relating to the status of national human rights institutions.

The NHRC signed a memorandum of understanding with the US-based human rights organization Solidarity Center in 2009.

In 2010, it was re-organized by then-Deputy Emir (now Emir) Tamim bin Hamad Al Thani by Decree No. 17 of that year. The Brookings Doha Center reported in 2021 that in 2010 the NHRC stopped providing information about how it has handled cases that reached it, and that this "make(s) it difficult to assess the NHRC’s effectiveness at addressing the complaints it receives".

In November 2010, the NHRC's new building in Fereej Abdel Aziz was opened by Prime Minister Hamad bin Jassim bin Jaber Al Thani.

=== Qatar diplomatic crisis ===
Since the beginning of the Qatari diplomatic crisis in 2017, the NHRC has held dozens of workshops, conferences and seminars with organizations and politicians worldwide. The NHRC's activities aimed to reveal the crisis violations of human rights as well as discussing the general situation of human rights in Qatar.

In September 2017, the NHRC Chairman Ali bin Sumaikh Al Marri underlined the urgent need to put an end to the suffering of the Qatari citizens and residents of Qatar as a result of the siege imposed on Qatar since June 2017. During a meeting with U.S official, Al Marri introduced the impact of the siege on the humanitarian status of the civilians in Qatar, as he called on United States to take serious action in order to put an end to the human rights violation caused by Saudi-led blockade.

According to the NHRC, the crisis affected the education of 190 Qatari students enrolled in Egyptian universities because of the government's imposition of new visa requirements. Some of the students were prevented from attending final exams in September 2017. As a response, the NHRC escalated the issue to several international organisations.

== Organization ==
As of 2015, Ali bin Samikh Al Marri is the chairman of the commission and Mohamed Saif Al Kuwari is vice-chairman. Fourteen members serve in the committee. The members are all appointed by Emiri Decree, and consist of representatives from civil society and government ministries.

== Mandates and functions ==
The commission's stated aims revolve around raising awareness of human rights abuses, monitoring and observing human rights abuses, and empowering individuals. Its stated means of advancing this goal include contributing to research programs related to human rights, conducting studies and providing advice and recommendations to legislative bodies.

The NHRC has been accredited by the United Nations' Global Alliance of National Human Rights Institutions (GANHRI) with "A status", meaning formal compliance with the Paris Principles relating to the status of NHRIs, since 2009. However, GANHRI has repeatedly criticized certain aspects of the NHRC's structure and conduct, as can be seen in its latest report on the matter from 2021.

One of the main and persistent subjects of criticism has been the appointment and dismissal of NHRC members by the emir, and in processes that lack transparency, clear criteria, and broad consultation and/or participation. The 2021 report noted that GAHNRI's recommendations on this subject from 2009 and 2015 remained unaddressed. The 2021 report also criticized the membership of government ministry representatives in the decision-making body of the NHRC (though it noted that they form a minority and do not hold voting rights), and especially highlighted "the lack of clarity" as to the current vice-chair’s relationship to a government ministry, warning that these issues have "the potential to impact on both the real and perceived independence" of the NHRC.

In 2015, Geneva-based human rights organization Alkarama submitted a report, calling on GANHRI to downgrade Qatar's NHRC status from "A" to "B". In 2016, after GANHRI renewed the NHRC's A status, Alkarama welcomed GANHRI's recommendations for improvement for the NHRC, and congratulated the institution for its renewed accreditation, but added that it "regrets" that some issues of lack of independence from the executive were not taken into consideration by GANHRI. In particular, it claimed that the state's control over the allocation of the institution's expenses, as well as its founding text coming from the executive (due to the lack of separation of power between the executive and the legislative in the country), meant that the NHRC fails to meet some criteria set in the second Paris Principle.

In 2021, it was reported by the Brookings Doha Center that the NHRC was one of the few national human rights institutions (NHRIs) that had a help desk staffed with representatives from communities of "common migrant origin countries". It also noted that while the annual report of the NHRC is "one of the better ones" among NHRIs in the MENA region, "the variation in its categorization and aggregation of complaints confuses more than clarifies", and that after 2010 it stopped providing information about how it has handled cases that reached it. The 2010 report showed that it had received 791 complaints, 663 of which were referred to "competent authorities", and among these 398 did not receive a reply from the agency that they were referred to, and 98 had no information available about them. 17 of the complaints were classified as "rejected" by the NHRC, and 13 were classified as "resolved". The Brookings report noted that the cessation of reporting about the results of cases "make(s) it difficult to assess the NHRC’s effectiveness at addressing the complaints it receives".
