= Working Group on Arbitrary Detention =

United Nations working group

The Working Group on Arbitrary Detention (WGAD) is a body of independent human rights experts that investigate cases of arbitrary arrest and detention. Arbitrary arrest and detention is the imprisonment or detainment of an individual, by a State, without respect for due process. These actions may be in violation of international human rights law.

The Working Group was established by resolution in 1991 by the former UN Commission on Human Rights. It is one of the thematic special procedures overseen by the United Nations Human Rights Council, and is therefore a subsidiary body of the UN.

== Mandate and composition ==
The Working Group is mandated to receive and verify information from a variety of sources, in order to investigate cases of detention imposed arbitrarily, or otherwise inconsistently with the relevant international standards set forth in the Universal Declaration of Human Rights. Article 9 states: 'No one shall be subjected to arbitrary arrest, detention, or exile'. In considering claims of arbitrary detention, the Working Group is not only guided by State national law, but other international legal instruments may also be relevant if accepted by the States concerned. For example, the International Covenant on Civil and Political Rights, Article 9(1) states; "Everyone has the right to liberty and security of person. No one shall be subjected to arbitrary arrest or detention. No one shall be Deprived of his liberty except on such grounds and in accordance with such procedure as are established by law."

The Working Group's role is to investigate individual cases of arbitrary detention, as well as situations where the conditions in a country prompt concern over widespread occurrences of arbitrary detention. It has an intentionally broad mandate, to allow flexibility, and allow anyone to seek its assistance. The Working Group may send urgent appeals to governments to ascertain the whereabouts and condition of those allegedly detained, issues opinions on the compliance with international law and may also conduct fact-finding visits to countries. The Working Group also issue deliberations on issues, to assist States in avoiding behaviour that may enable arbitrary detention. Ensuring a communicative dialogue with Governments and intergovernmental and non-governmental organisations allows the Working Group to achieve success. The Working Group must work in coordination with other Human Rights Council mechanisms and is mandated to carry out its task with discretion, objectivity and independence.

The Working Group mandate reflects the commission's concerns regarding worldwide instances of detention without legal basis. The Commission on Human Rights entrusted the Working Group with the following mandate:

1. To investigate cases of detention imposed arbitrarily in individual cases
2. To complete field missions in order to receive information from Government and intergovernmental and non-governmental organizations, and receive information from the individuals concerned, their families or their representatives;
3. To present annual reports to the Human Rights Council

The mandate lasts for a period of three years, and was most recently extended for a further three-year period by Human Rights Council resolution 33/30 of 30 September 2016.

=== Membership ===
The Working Group is composed of five independent experts. They are appointed in equitable geographical distribution from the following regions: Africa, Asia, Eastern Europe, Western Europe and Other Countries, and South America and Caribbean. Three sessions are held per year, each lasting between five and eight days.

The current members of the Working Group are:

- Matthew Gillett (Chair-Rapporteur) New Zealand 2022–2028
- Priya Gopalan (Vice-Chair on Follow-Up) Malaysia 2021–2027
- Ganna Yudkivska Ukraine(Vice-Chair on Communications) 2022–2028
- Miriam Estrada-Castillo Ecuador 2020–2026
- Mumba Malila Zambia 2020–2026

Former members include:

- Elina Steinerte 🇱🇻 Latvia 2016 – 2022
- Leigh Toomey Australia 2015–2021
- Seong-Phil Hong South Korea 2014–2020
- José Antonio Guevara Bermúdez Mexico 2014–2020
- Sètondji Roland Adjovi Benin 2014–2020
- Mads Andenas Norway
- Shaheen Sardar Ali Pakistan
- Vladimir Tochilovsky Ukraine 2010-2016
- Tamás Bán Hungary
- Manuela Carmena Castrillo Spain
- Roberto Garretón Merino Chile
- Seyyed Mohammad Hashemi Iran
- Laity Kama Senegal
- Louis Joinet France
- Kapil Sibal India
- El Hadji Malick Sow Senegal
- Petr Uhl Czech Republic
- Soledad Villagra de Biedermann Paraguay
- Leïla Zerroügui Algeria

== Process ==
The Working Group on Arbitrary Detention is tasked with acting on information of alleged cases of arbitrary detention. To fulfil this mandate, the Working Group may decide individual complaints of arbitrary detention, formulate deliberations to provide guidance on the interpretation of international standards related to detention circumstances and provide reports for the Human Rights Council. It may undertake country visits to achieve this.

The Working Group does not require the exhaustion of local remedies. However, its purpose is not to replace national courts. This broadens its jurisdiction, as it allows the Group to bypass governments that may be stalling procedure.

Detention in itself does not necessarily violate human rights. Therefore, the Working Group must distinguish between lawful exercise of police power, and detention so lacking in lawful basis or otherwise unreasonable, that it must be considered arbitrary.

== Individual complaints and urgent appeals ==
=== Individual complaints ===
The Working Group on Arbitrary Detention is unique in that its mandate expressly provides for the consideration of individual complaints. The Working Group is the only non-treaty-based UN human rights mechanism to investigate and decide individual complaints. Individuals anywhere in the world are therefore able to petition the Working Group for consideration. The Group acts on information submitted to it by individuals directly, their families, or through representatives of Non-governmental organisations.

The Working Group then sends communications to the Governments concerned, to clarify or bring attention to the case. The Government is invited to respond to the allegations within 60 days, with its view on the issue. The Working Group then sends the reply to the source of the allegations, requesting more information. This process allows the Group to remain neutral in the information-gathering process.

The Working Group has identified detention or imprisonment as arbitrary if it falls into one of the following categories;

1. Imposed without any legal basis
2. Imposed because of the exercise of human rights
3. Imposed in violation of the principle of fair trial
4. Prolonged administrative custody imposed on asylum seekers, immigrants or refugees
5. Based on illegal discriminatory grounds

Examples of this can include continued detention after the completion of a sentence, denial of the exercise of fundamental rights such as freedom of expression, violations of the right to a fair trial, asylum and immigration claims, or detention based on ethnicity; religion; sexual orientation, etc.

Upon receiving information under this adversary procedure, the Working Group then adopts one of the following approaches;

- If the individual concerned has been released, the Group may still decide to formulate an opinion on whether or not the deprivation of liberty was arbitrary
- The Group may find that the deprivation of liberty is not arbitrary, and will state an opinion as such
- The Group may seek further information from the individual or the Government
- If further information is unable to be sought, the Group may file the case subject to further confirmation
- The Group may decide that the arbitrary deprivation of liberty has been established, state an opinion to that effect, and make recommendations to the Government. These are then communicated to the Government. The opinion requests that the state takes the necessary steps to remedy the situation in order to bring it into conformity. The fulfilment of this request is often achieved by the release of the individual.

Upon evaluating contradicting evidence, such as between an individual claiming arbitrary deprivation of liberty and a government, the Working Group use a standard of 'convincing evidence', as opposed to evidence beyond a reasonable doubt. The informal nature of the Working Group can strengthen the position of the individual represented, by easing the objective burden of proof on them.

=== Urgent appeals ===
If the Working Group receives information that raises concern about the immediate wellbeing of an individual, then it may, at its discretion, pursue an urgent action. The source must provide sufficiently reliable information that the continuation of deprivation poses significant threat to the psychological or physical wellbeing to the individual. The alleged situation may be time-sensitive in relation to loss of life or deportation. Rapid communication is sought with diplomats, such as the Foreign Minister (or equivalent). The Working Group request immediate action to ensure the detained person's right to life, as well as physical and mental integrity are respected. This a purely humanitarian undertaking, and does not prejudice the Working Group's final opinion on whether the deprivation of liberty is indeed arbitrary.

== Advisory procedures ==
=== Country visits ===
In order to fulfil its mandate, the Working Group may conduct country visits. These provide an opportunity for the Group to understand the specific situation prevailing in countries. The Group undertake one to three country visits per year, upon invitation from the Government concerned. For example, in May 2017 the Working Group visited Argentina. In 2016 the Group visited the United States of America and Azerbaijan. The Group tend to visit between one and four countries per year.

On a country visit, members of the Working Group engage in a variety of tasks. These can include meeting with representatives of the executive, legislators, and other state officials. The Group also has the right to visit places of detention and have private discussions with detainees. Country visits enable the Working Group to gain a greater understanding of the social, political and historical environment in each country, enabling them to create context-appropriate recommendations.

=== Deliberations ===
More generally, the Working Group seeks to encourage broader international understanding of arbitrary detention, and promote universal standards. This is achieved through a more general advisory role, with the formulation of deliberations. The Group formulates deliberations on general issues to assist States in safeguarding against the practice of arbitrary deprivation of liberty. For example, the Group have developed deliberations on issues relating to house arrest, psychiatric detention, deprivation of liberty subsequent to a conviction and resulting from the use of the internet, on rehabilitation through labour and situations regarding immigrants and asylum seekers. The Group have also provided legal analysis regarding the International Criminal Tribunal for the Former Yugoslavia and clarified the definition of arbitrary deprivation of liberty under customary international law and the urgent appeals procedure.

=== Annual reports ===
The Working Group must submit Annual Reports to the Human Rights Council, summarising the previous year's activities. The report will express observations made while investigating cases and on field missions in differing countries. The report details the Working Group's reasoning behind legal insufficiencies, policies and judicial policies that are the cause of arbitrary deprivation of liberty, and recommend best practice to safeguard against arbitrary deprivation of liberty.

== Criticisms ==
The Group functions as a quasi-judicial body. The Group has no direct enforcement power of its own. Instead, it relies on communication among states, policy-makers and advocates to encourage governments to implement its recommendations. Due to its reliance on the cooperation of states, it can be argued that this weakens the authority of the Group.

The opinions of the Working Group however are legally binding to the extent that they are based on binding international human rights laws, such as the International Covenant on Civil and Political Rights. This is applicable to states that have ratified the Covenant.

The opinions of the Working Group are considered authoritative by some prominent international judicial institutions including the European Court of Human Rights. The features of the Working Group arguably play a role in its success, as it allows it to provide a politically viable alternative to treaty-based human rights enforcement mechanisms. The flexible mandate enables it to avoid direct political confrontation with governments, ultimately achieving more politically acceptable and lasting solutions to individual cases of arbitrary detention. While the opinions of the Working Group are not binding on states, they can facilitate information sharing among non-governmental organisations and governments. This can in turn lead to an increase in government accountability.

A further criticism of the Group is that it has taken no steps toward creating a robust follow-up procedure, to apply pressure on states arbitrarily detaining individuals. Establishing a systematic follow-up procedure could ensure an even greater accountability on governments, acting as a name and shame process to pressure them into action. A follow-up procedure may also be beneficial for providing feedback for future policy decisions. It could also aid non-governmental organisations in petitioning governments with unresolved cases. Having a record of resolved cases could help the Group to keep track of the status of detainees and any correlation between the action of the Working Group. Information and statistics drawn from this can be publicised, and help to increase outreach.

== Development of draft principles ==
In 2012, the Human Rights Council requested the Working Group on Arbitrary Detention to develop draft basic principles. These were to provide guidelines on remedies and procedures for anyone deprived of their liberty by arrest or detention to bring proceedings before court, in order that the court may decide without delay on the lawfulness of their detention and order their release if the detention is not lawful. The intention behind these were to assist states in fulfilling their obligation to avoid arbitrary deprivation of liberty. States, treaty bodies, human rights institutions and non-governmental organisations were invited to submit details on the treatment of the right to bring such proceedings before a court, in their respective legal frameworks. The text was adopted in April 2015.

== Notable cases ==
=== Julian Assange ===
On 5 February 2016, the group released a report stating that Assange had been subject to arbitrary detention by the UK and Swedish Governments since 7 December 2010, including his time in prison in Britain and Sweden, on conditional bail, and in the Ecuadorian embassy. According to the report, Assange should be allowed to walk free and be given compensation.

The UK and Swedish governments rejected the report. Then-UK Secretary of State for Foreign and Commonwealth Affairs, Philip Hammond, said the claim was "ridiculous" and that the group was "made up of lay people", and called Assange a "fugitive from justice" who "can come out any time he chooses". UK and Swedish prosecutors called the group's claims irrelevant. The UK said it would arrest Assange should he leave the Ecuadorian embassy. Mark Ellis, executive director of the International Bar Association, stated that the finding is "not binding on British law". United Nations High Commissioner for Human Rights Zeid Ra'ad al Hussein has claimed that the finding is based on international law.

On 13 February 2018, the Westminster Magistrates' Court, while considering whether the arrest warrant issued against Assange should be upheld, rejected the findings of the Working Group, stating in part that "The group appears to have based its conclusions on some misunderstandings of what occurred after Mr Assange's arrest." Senior District Judge (Chief Magistrate) Emma Arbuthnot did not find that Mr Assange's stay in the Embassy was "inappropriate, unjust, unpredictable, unreasonable, unnecessary or disproportionate."

=== Tayeb Benabderrahmane ===
In 2025, the WGAD issued Opinion No. 28/2025, concluding that the deprivation of liberty of Tayeb Benabderrahmane in Qatar was arbitrary under categories I, II, and III of its working methods. The opinion called on the Qatari government to open an independent investigation, to provide full reparation for the violations suffered, and to indicate, as part of the follow-up procedure, the measures taken to comply.

The facts underlying the petition date back to January 2020. Benabderrahmane was arrested in Doha, held incommunicado and then detained at Salwa Road prison until 1 July 2020, before being placed under house arrest until 1 November 2020. He denounced the absence of effective consular assistance, the impossibility of accessing independent counsel, and ill-treatment. After returning to France, he initiated in 2022 an investment arbitration procedure (ICSID ARB/22/23) under the 1996 France–Qatar bilateral investment treaty.

On 31 May 2023, the Doha criminal court sentenced him to death in absentia for espionage. News of the conviction became public in autumn 2023 and received coverage in the French press. In the context of the arbitration, the ICSID tribunal adopted on 20 December 2023 a procedural order on provisional measures directing Qatar to suspend the execution of the death penalty until a final award was rendered. In July 2024, another order reaffirmed these commitments and recorded the State's undertaking not to endanger the claimant's life or security and not to carry out the sentence.

The WGAD's opinion was issued after an adversarial procedure during its 102nd session in April 2025 and published in summer 2025. It qualified the detention as arbitrary and set out detailed recommendations, including on reparations and prosecutions against those responsible. The French press noted that this was the first time a French national had obtained a WGAD opinion against Qatar. The case attracted both national and international attention, with NGOs and practitioners urging Qatar's National Human Rights Committee to implement the UN findings. The ICSID proceedings remain pending, with the case publicly listed by UNCTAD.

=== Steven R. Donziger ===
In September 2021, shortly after Donziger was sentenced in a New York for petty contempt of court, the group determined that Donzinger's arrest was arbitrary and a violation of international law and called for his release. In reviewing the case, WGAD found a "staggering display of lack of objectivity and impartiality" on the part of the judges involved, particularly Federal District Court Judges Lewis A. Kaplan and Loretta Preska. The report stated that his sentencing was done in retaliation for Donziger's work as a legal representative of indigenous communities in Ecuador. The group called on the US government to conduct a thorough investigation of the circumstances of Donziger's prosecution and imprisonment and to "take appropriate measures against those responsible for the violation of his rights."

Donziger's lawyer, Martin Garbus, stated that he would be using the group's report to demand Donziger's release from house arrest.

=== Yalqun Rozi ===
In September 2022, the group published a statement regarding the Uyghur literary critic Yalqun Rozi, who in 2018 had been sentenced to 15 years in prison for "inciting subversion of state power". It determined that there was "nothing to suggest that Mr. Rozi engaged in or incited violence", that he had not been given "denied appropriate legal assistance during his detention and subsequent trial", and that there had been no rebuttal by the Chinese government of the "very serious allegations presented by the source", which it did not name.

=== Nourah al-Qatani ===
The group declared Nourah al-Qahtani's 45 year imprisonment sentence arbitrary, and in June 2023 called for her immediate release.
