= Cheshmeh =

Cheshmeh or Chashmeh (Persian: چشمه) may refer to:

- Cheshmeh, Bushehr
- Cheshmeh, Isfahan
- Chashmeh, Markazi
- Cheshmeh, Markazi
- Cheshmeh, North Khorasan
- Cheshmeh, South Khorasan
- Cheshmeh, Razavi Khorasan
- Cheshmeh, Bardaskan, Razavi Khorasan Province
- Cheshmeh, Mehrestan, Sistan and Baluchestan Province
- Cheshmeh, West Azerbaijan

== See also ==
- Cheshmeh and Chashmeh are common elements in Iranian place names; see and
- Chesma (disambiguation)
- Cheshma (disambiguation)
- Chashma (disambiguation)
