= Chesma =

Chesma (or Chesme, Cesme, from the Turkish Çeşme or Cheshme) may refer to:

- Cheshmeh, West Azerbaijan (also known as Cheshma), a village in Iran
- Chesma (mythology), a fountain-spirit or nymph in Turkish mythology
- Çeşme, a small town in Turkey
- Çeşme Bay, near Çeşme
- Battle of Chesma, fought in Çeşme Bay in 1770
- Four monuments built by Catherine the Great to commemorate this battle:
  - Chesme Church
  - Chesme Column, in Tsarskoye Selo (1778)
  - Chesma Obelisk, in Gatchina (1775)
  - Chesma Palace, in Saint Petersburg (1774–1777)
- Chesma (ship), name of several ships of the Imperial Russian Navy
- Chesma (rural locality), a rural locality (a selo) in Chesmensky District of Chelyabinsk Oblast, Russia

== See also ==
- Česma, a river in Croatia
- Chashma (disambiguation)
- Cheshma (disambiguation)
- Cheshmeh (disambiguation)
