= Chesmensky =

Chesmensky (masculine), Chesmenskaya (feminine), or Chesmenskoye (neuter) may refer to:

- Chesmensky District, a district of Chelyabinsk Oblast, Russia
- Chesmensky (rural locality), a rural locality (a lighthouse) in Arkhangelsk Oblast, Russia
- Chesmenskaya Church
- Chesmensky Palace
- Chesmensky (honorific), a Russian noble honorific surname earned after the Battle of Chesma. It may refer to:
  - Alexei Grigoryevich Orlov-Chesmensky
  - Anna Orlova-Chesmenskaya
  - Aleksandr Chesmensky (1763-1820), Russian major-general

== See also ==
- Chesma (disambiguation)
