= Mozaffarabad, Khoy =

Village in West Azerbaijan province, Iran

Mozaffarabad Persian: مظفرآباد
- Village
- Location within Iran
- Coordinates: 38°45′50″N 45°15′04″E
- Country: Iran
- Province: West Azerbaijan
- County: Khoy
- District: Ivughli
- Rural District: Ivughli

Population (2016)
  - Total: 281
- Time zone: UTC+3:30 (IRST)

Hoseynabad-e Marakan (Persian: حسين ابادمراكان) (Note: Also romanized as Ḩoseynābād-e Marākān; also known as Ḩoseyn Khān Kandī and Ḩoseyn‘alīkhān) is a village in Ivughli Rural District of Ivughli District in Khoy County, West Azerbaijan province, Iran.

== Demographics ==
=== Population ===
At the time of the 2006 National Census, the village's population was 289 in 64 households. The following census in 2011 counted 383 people in 84 households. The 2016 census measured the population of the village as 281 people in 87 households.
