= Yarim Qayeh =

Village in West Azerbaijan province, Iran

Yarim Qayeh Persian: ياريم قيه
- Village
- Location within Iran
- Coordinates: 38°39′48″N 45°01′47″E
- Country: Iran
- Province: West Azerbaijan
- County: Khoy
- District: Ivughli
- Rural District: Ivughli

Population (2016)
  - Total: 290
- Time zone: UTC+3:30 (IRST)

Yarim Qayeh (Persian: ياريم قيه) (Note: Also romanized as Yārīm Qayeh; also known as Yārem Qayeh, Yarim Ghayeh, Yarimqaya, and Yarymkaya) is a village in Ivughli Rural District of Ivughli District in Khoy County, West Azerbaijan province, Iran.

== Demographics ==
=== Population ===
At the time of the 2006 National Census, the village's population was 357 in 75 households, when it was in Dizaj Rural District. The following census in 2011 counted 356 people in 96 households, by which time the village had been transferred to Ivughli Rural District. The 2016 census measured the population of the village as 290 people in 83 households.
