= Bileh Var =

Village in West Azerbaijan province, Iran

Bileh Var Persian: بیلوار
- Village
- Location within Iran
- Coordinates: 38°40′30″N 45°07′03″E
- Country: Iran
- Province: West Azerbaijan
- County: Khoy
- District: Ivughli
- Rural District: Ivughli

Population (2016)
  - Total: 1,139
- Time zone: UTC+3:30 (IRST)

Bileh Var (Persian: بيله وار) (Note: Also romanized as Bīleh Vār; also known as Bīl Vār and Bīlevār) is a village in Ivughli Rural District of Ivughli District in Khoy County, West Azerbaijan province, Iran.

== Demographics ==
=== Population ===
At the time of the 2006 National Census, the village's population was 1,215 in 318 households. The following census in 2011 counted 1,276 people in 396 households. The 2016 census measured the population of the village as 1,139 people in 378 households.
