= Tappeh Bashi, West Azerbaijan =

Village in West Azerbaijan province, Iran

Tappeh Bashi Persian: تپه باشي
- Village
- Location within Iran
- Coordinates: 38°41′07″N 45°13′27″E
- Country: Iran
- Province: West Azerbaijan
- County: Khoy
- District: Ivughli
- Rural District: Ivughli

Population (2016)
  - Total: 427
- Time zone: UTC+3:30 (IRST)

Tappeh Bashi (Persian: تپه باشي) (Note: Also romanized as Tappeh Bāshī) is a village in Ivughli Rural District of Ivughli District in Khoy County, West Azerbaijan province, Iran.

== Demographics ==
=== Population ===
At the time of the 2006 National Census, the village's population was 448 in 111 households. The following census in 2011 counted 475 people in 136 households. The 2016 census measured the population of the village as 427 people in 134 households.
