= Cheshma =

Cheshma may refer to:

- Cheshmeh, West Azerbaijan (also known as Cheshma), a village in Iran
- Cheshma, Bulgaria, a village in Zlataritsa Municipality, Bulgaria
- Cheshma, Macedonia, a village in Kisela Voda Municipality, Macedonia

== See also ==
- Chashma (disambiguation)
- Chesma (disambiguation)
- Cheshmeh (disambiguation)
