= Bizandeh =

Village in West Azerbaijan province, Iran

Bizandeh Persian: بيزنده
- Village
- Location within Iran
- Coordinates: 38°41′49″N 45°07′22″E
- Country: Iran
- Province: West Azerbaijan
- County: Khoy
- District: Ivughli
- Rural District: Ivughli

Population (2016)
  - Total: 541
- Time zone: UTC+3:30 (IRST)

Bizandeh (Persian: بيزنده) (Note: Also romanized as Bīzandeh; also known as Bezneh Deh) is a village in Ivughli Rural District of Ivughli District in Khoy County, West Azerbaijan province, Iran.

== Demographics ==
=== Population ===
At the time of the 2006 National Census, the village's population was 674 in 181 households. The following census in 2011 counted 620 people in 187 households. The 2016 census measured the population of the village as 541 people in 192 households.
