= Ensi =

Ensi may refer to:

== Title ==
- Ensign (rank), (as an abbreviation of)
- Ensí, a Mesopotamian royal title in various Babylonian city states

== Entities ==
- Ensi (rapper), an Italian rapper
- Ensi, Iran, a village in West Azerbaijan Province, Iran
- ensî, (plural) the Old High German word for pagan deities

== Organizations ==
- Evolution and the Nature of Science Institutes (ENSI), Indiana University program to help high school biology teachers cope with the problems associated with teaching evolution
- Eidgenössisches Nuklearsicherheitsinspektorat (ENSI), the Swiss Federal Nuclear Safety Inspectorate
