= Vishlaq-e Olya =

Village in West Azerbaijan province, Iran

Vishlaq-e Olya Persian: ويشلق عليا
- Village
- Location within Iran
- Coordinates: 38°36′29″N 45°03′20″E
- Country: Iran
- Province: West Azerbaijan
- County: Khoy
- District: Ivughli
- Rural District: Valdian

Population (2016)
  - Total: 611
- Time zone: UTC+3:30 (IRST)

Vishlaq-e Olya (Persian: ويشلق عليا) (Note: Also romanized as Vīshlaq ‘Olyā and Vīshlaq-e ‘Olyā; also known as Vaslar Yukāri, Vishlagh Olya, Vīshlaq Bālā, Vīshlaq-e Bālā, and Yukhari-Veshlya) is a village in Valdian Rural District of Ivughli District in Khoy County, West Azerbaijan province, Iran.

== Demographics ==
=== Population ===
At the time of the 2006 National Census, the village's population was 784 in 225 households. The following census in 2011 counted 726 people in 242 households. The 2016 census measured the population of the village as 611 people in 209 households.
