= Valdian =

Village in West Azerbaijan province, Iran

Valdian Persian: ولديان
- Village
- Location within Iran
- Coordinates: 38°29′15″N 45°11′44″E
- Country: Iran
- Province: West Azerbaijan
- County: Khoy
- District: Ivughli
- Rural District: Valdian

Population (2016)
  - Total: 1,572
- Time zone: UTC+3:30 (IRST)

Valdian (Persian: ولديان) (Note: Also romanized as Valadiyan, Valdeyān, Valdīān, and Valdīyān) is a village in Valdian Rural District of Ivughli District in Khoy County, West Azerbaijan province, Iran.

== Demographics ==
=== Population ===
At the time of the 2006 National Census, the village's population was 1,668 in 376 households. The following census in 2011 counted 1,622 people in 474 households. The 2016 census measured the population of the village as 1,572 people in 500 households. It was the most populous village in its rural district.
