= Mahlezan =

Village in West Azerbaijan province, Iran

Mahlezan Persian: مهلزان
- Village
- Location within Iran
- Coordinates: 38°39′08″N 45°05′12″E
- Country: Iran
- Province: West Azerbaijan
- County: Khoy
- District: Ivughli
- Rural District: Valdian

Population (2016)
  - Total: 393
- Time zone: UTC+3:30 (IRST)

Mahlezan (Persian: مهلزان) (Note: Also romanized as Mahlezān and Mahl-i-zan; also known as Mahlah Zān, Mahlan Zān, Mahlehzān, Makhlazan, Malhaz̄ān, and Mātāzān; Armenian: Մահլազան or Մահղխազան) is a village in, and the capital of, Valdian Rural District in Ivughli District of Khoy County, West Azerbaijan province, Iran. The previous capital of the rural district was the village of Saidabad.

== Demographics ==
=== Population ===
At the time of the 2006 National Census, the village's population was 462 in 127 households. The following census in 2011 counted 429 people in 120 households. The 2016 census measured the population of the village as 393 people in 126 households.

== See also ==
- Holy Cross Church
