= Pir Kandi =

Village in West Azerbaijan province, Iran

Pir Kandi Persian: پيركندي
- Village
- Location within Iran
- Coordinates: 38°42′54″N 45°06′15″E
- Country: Iran
- Province: West Azerbaijan
- County: Khoy
- District: Ivughli
- Rural District: Ivughli

Population (2016)
  - Total: 1,220
- Time zone: UTC+3:30 (IRST)

Pir Kandi (Persian: پيركندي) (Note: Also romanized as Pīr Kandī) is a village in Ivughli Rural District of Ivughli District in Khoy County, West Azerbaijan province, Iran.

== Demographics ==
=== Population ===
At the time of the 2006 National Census, the village's population was 1,302 in 373 households. The following census in 2011 counted 1,290 people in 415 households. The 2016 census measured the population of the village as 1,220 people in 407 households.
