= Siah Baz =

Village in West Azerbaijan province, Iran

Siah Baz Persian: سيه باز
- Village
- Location within Iran
- Coordinates: 38°46′34″N 45°08′37″E
- Country: Iran
- Province: West Azerbaijan
- County: Khoy
- District: Ivughli
- Rural District: Ivughli

Population (2016)
  - Total: 2,045
- Time zone: UTC+3:30 (IRST)

Siah Baz (Persian: سيه باز) (Note: Also romanized as Sīah Bāz and Sīyāh Bāz; also known as Seyyed ‘Abbās) is a village in Ivughli Rural District of Ivughli District in Khoy County, West Azerbaijan province, Iran.

== Demographics ==
=== Population ===
At the time of the 2006 National Census, the village's population was 2,867 in 694 households. The following census in 2011 counted 2,618 people in 666 households. The 2016 census measured the population of the village as 2,045 people in 638 households. It was the most populous village in its rural district.
