= Bagh Daraq =

Village in West Azerbaijan province, Iran

Bagh Daraq Persian: باغ درق
- Village
- Location within Iran
- Coordinates: 38°37′31″N 45°02′50″E
- Country: Iran
- Province: West Azerbaijan
- County: Khoy
- District: Ivughli
- Rural District: Valdian

Population (2016)
  - Total: 739
- Time zone: UTC+3:30 (IRST)

Bagh Daraq (Persian: باغ درق) (Note: Also romanized as Bāgh Daraq and Bāghdaraq; also known as Bagdere, Bāgh Darreh, Beg Dara, and Beyg Darreh) is a village in Valdian Rural District of Ivughli District in Khoy County, West Azerbaijan province, Iran.

== Demographics ==
=== Population ===
At the time of the 2006 National Census, the village's population was 828 in 195 households. The following census in 2011 counted 814 people in 224 households. The 2016 census measured the population of the village as 739 people in 222 households.
