= Marakan =

Village in West Azerbaijan province, Iran

Marakan Persian: مراكان
- Village
- Location within Iran
- Coordinates: 38°50′59″N 45°15′29″E
- Country: Iran
- Province: West Azerbaijan
- County: Khoy
- District: Ivughli
- Rural District: Ivughli

Population (2016)
  - Total: 621
- Time zone: UTC+3:30 (IRST)

Marakan (Persian: مراكان) (Note: Also romanized as Marākān and Marakān) is a village in Ivughli Rural District of Ivughli District in Khoy County, West Azerbaijan province, Iran.

== Demographics ==
=== Population ===
At the time of the 2006 National Census, the village's population was 854 in 198 households. The following census in 2011 counted 734 people in 217 households. The 2016 census measured the population of the village as 621 people in 185 households.
