= Vishlaq-e Sofla =

Village in West Azerbaijan province, Iran

Vishlaq-e Sofla Persian: ويشلق سفلي
- Village
- Location within Iran
- Coordinates: 38°37′21″N 45°03′44″E
- Country: Iran
- Province: West Azerbaijan
- County: Khoy
- District: Ivughli
- Rural District: Valdian

Population (2016)
  - Total: 310
- Time zone: UTC+3:30 (IRST)

Vishlaq-e Sofla (Persian: ويشلق سفلي) (Note: Also romanized as Vīshlaq Soflá and Vīshlaq-e Soflā; also known as Ashaga Veshlya, Vaslar Āshāghi, Vishlagh Sofla, Vīshlaq Pā’īn, and Vīshlaq-e Pā’īn) is a village in Valdian Rural District of Ivughli District in Khoy County, West Azerbaijan province, Iran.

== Demographics ==
=== Population ===
At the time of the 2006 National Census, the village's population was 377 in 91 households. The following census in 2011 counted 348 people in 98 households. The 2016 census measured the population of the village as 310 people in 102 households.
