= Hoseynabad-e Marakan =

Village in West Azerbaijan province, Iran

Hoseynabad-e Marakan Persian: حسين ابادمراكان
- Village
- Location within Iran
- Coordinates: 38°50′52″N 45°13′33″E
- Country: Iran
- Province: West Azerbaijan
- County: Khoy
- District: Ivughli
- Rural District: Ivughli

Population (2016)
  - Total: 16
- Time zone: UTC+3:30 (IRST)

Hoseynabad-e Marakan (Persian: حسين ابادمراكان) (Note: Also romanized as Ḩoseynābād-e Marākān; also known as Ḩoseyn Khān Kandī and Ḩoseyn‘alīkhān) is a village in Ivughli Rural District of Ivughli District in Khoy County, West Azerbaijan province, Iran.

== Demographics ==
=== Population ===
At the time of the 2006 National Census, the village's population was 22 in four households. The following census in 2011 counted 21 people in five households. The 2016 census measured the population of the village as 16 people in four households.
