= TCG Çeşme =

TCG Çeşme is the name of the following ships of the Turkish Navy:

- TCG Çeşme (M 505), ex-HMS Elfreda (J402), an Auk-class minesweeper acquired in 1947, stricken in 1974
- TCG Çeşme (A 599), ex-USNS Silas Bent, lead Silas Bent-class survey ship acquired in 1999 and in commission since 2000

== See also ==
- Çeşme (disambiguation)
