= Agheshlu =

Village in West Azerbaijan province, Iran

Agheshlu Persian: اغشلو
- Village
- Location within Iran
- Coordinates: 38°37′08″N 45°01′25″E
- Country: Iran
- Province: West Azerbaijan
- County: Khoy
- District: Ivughli
- Rural District: Valdian

Population (2016)
  - Total: 710
- Time zone: UTC+3:30 (IRST)

Agheshlu (Persian: اغشلو) (Note: Also romanized as Agheshloo and Āgheshlū; also known as Āgheshlī, Akishli, Akyshly, Āq Ashlū, and Āqeshlū) is a village in Valdian Rural District of Ivughli District in Khoy County, West Azerbaijan province, Iran.

== Demographics ==
=== Population ===
At the time of the 2006 National Census, the village's population was 673 in 129 households. The following census in 2011 counted 716 people in 206 households. The 2016 census measured the population of the village as 710 people in 201 households.
