= Aghbolagh, Khoy =

Village in West Azerbaijan province, Iran

Aghbolagh Persian: اغبلاغ
- Village
- Location within Iran
- Coordinates: 38°36′51″N 45°12′42″E
- Country: Iran
- Province: West Azerbaijan
- County: Khoy
- District: Ivughli
- Rural District: Ivughli

Population (2016)
  - Total: 638
- Time zone: UTC+3:30 (IRST)

Aghbolagh (Persian: اغبلاغ) (Note: Also romanized as Āgh Bolāgh and Āghbolāgh) is a village in Ivughli Rural District of Ivughli District in Khoy County, West Azerbaijan province, Iran.

== Demographics ==
=== Population ===
At the time of the 2006 National Census, the village's population was 652 in 165 households. The following census in 2011 counted 680 people in 205 households. The 2016 census measured the population of the village as 638 people in 202 households.
