= Etezadiyeh =

Village in West Azerbaijan province, Iran

Etezadiyeh Persian: اعتضاديه
- Village
- Location within Iran
- Coordinates: 38°47′22″N 45°13′56″E
- Country: Iran
- Province: West Azerbaijan
- County: Khoy
- District: Ivughli
- Rural District: Ivughli

Population (2016)
  - Total: 68
- Time zone: UTC+3:30 (IRST)

Etezadiyeh (Persian: اعتضاديه) (Note: Also romanized as E‘teẕādīyeh) is a village in Ivughli Rural District of Ivughli District in Khoy County, West Azerbaijan province, Iran.

== Demographics ==
=== Population ===
At the time of the 2006 National Census, the village's population was 90 in 23 households. The following census in 2011 counted 33 people in 10 households. The 2016 census measured the population of the village as 68 people in 11 households.
