= Zaran, Iran =

Zaran (Persian: زارعن) in Iran may refer to:

- Zaran, West Azerbaijan
- Zaran, Zanjan
