= Ivughli =

City in West Azerbaijan province, Iran

Ivughli Persian: ايواوغلي
- City
- Location within Iran
- Coordinates: 38°42′56″N 45°12′27″E
- Country: Iran
- Province: West Azerbaijan
- County: Khoy
- District: Ivughli
- Established as a city: 2000

Population (2016)
  - Total: 3,320
- Time zone: UTC+3:30 (IRST)

Ivughli (Persian: ايواوغلي) (Note: Also romanized as Evowghlī, Īvowghlī, and Īvūghlī; also known as Evoghlī, Evoghlo, Evoghlu, Evoqlī, Mekājīk, and Ū Ūghlī) is a city in, and the capital of, Ivughli District in Khoy County, West Azerbaijan province, Iran. It also serves as the administrative center for Ivughli Rural District. The village of Ivughli was converted to a city in 2000.

== Demographics ==
=== Population ===
At the time of the 2006 National Census, the city's population was 3,282 in 887 households. The following census in 2011 counted 3,167 people in 918 households. The 2016 census measured the population of the city as 3,320 people in 999 households.
