= Zarean =

Village in West Azerbaijan province, Iran

Zarean Persian: زارعان
- Village
- Location within Iran
- Coordinates: 38°41′06″N 45°05′41″E
- Country: Iran
- Province: West Azerbaijan
- County: Khoy
- District: Ivughli
- Rural District: Valdian

Population (2016)
  - Total: 853
- Time zone: UTC+3:30 (IRST)

Zarean (Persian: زارعان) (Note: Also romanized as Zāre‘ān; also known as Zār‘ān and Zahrān; in Armenian: Զարաւան) is a village in Valdian Rural District of Ivughli District in Khoy County, West Azerbaijan province, Iran.

== Demographics ==
=== Population ===
At the time of the 2006 National Census, the village's population was 804 in 200 households. The following census in 2011 counted 736 people in 214 households. The 2016 census measured the population of the village as 853 people in 232 households.
