= Stepan Shchukin =

Russian portrait and watercolor painter

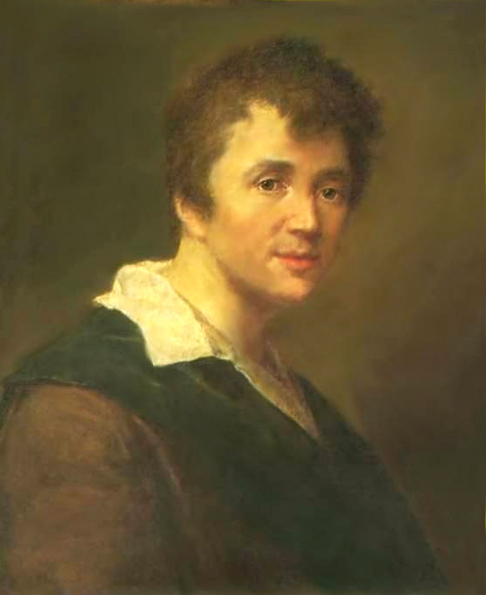
Portrait of a Young Man, a believed self-portrait, 1785

Stepan Semyonovich Shchukin (Russian: Степан Семёнович Щукин; 1754, Moscow – 10 October 1828, Saint Petersburg) was a Russian painter, active in St. Petersburg from the Catherinian era through Tsar Nicholas I's reign. Some sources give his year of birth as 1762.

== Biography ==
He was the son of an army sergeant and was apparently abandoned by his family. His first art lessons were taken with Dmitry Levitzky at the Imperial Academy of Arts. In 1782, he was sent abroad for "self-improvement", changed his name from Semyonov to Shchukin. and spent some time at the Académie de Peinture et de Sculpture, where he studied with Alexandre Roslin and Joseph-Benoît Suvée.

In 1786, he returned from Paris and, two years later, was appointed a teacher of portraiture at the Academy. He was promoted to Academician Candidate for his portrait of the Academy's Director Yury Felten then, the following year, was named a full Academician for his portrait of Tsar Paul I.

In 1803, he was appointed a Counselor and, a few months thereafter, became Secretary of the Academic Conference. Shortly before his death, he received the title of Senior Advisor. Among his best-known students were Alexander Varnek and Vasily Tropinin.

== Selected portraits ==
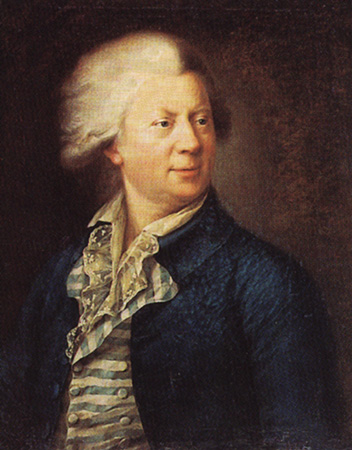
Yury Felten, 1786

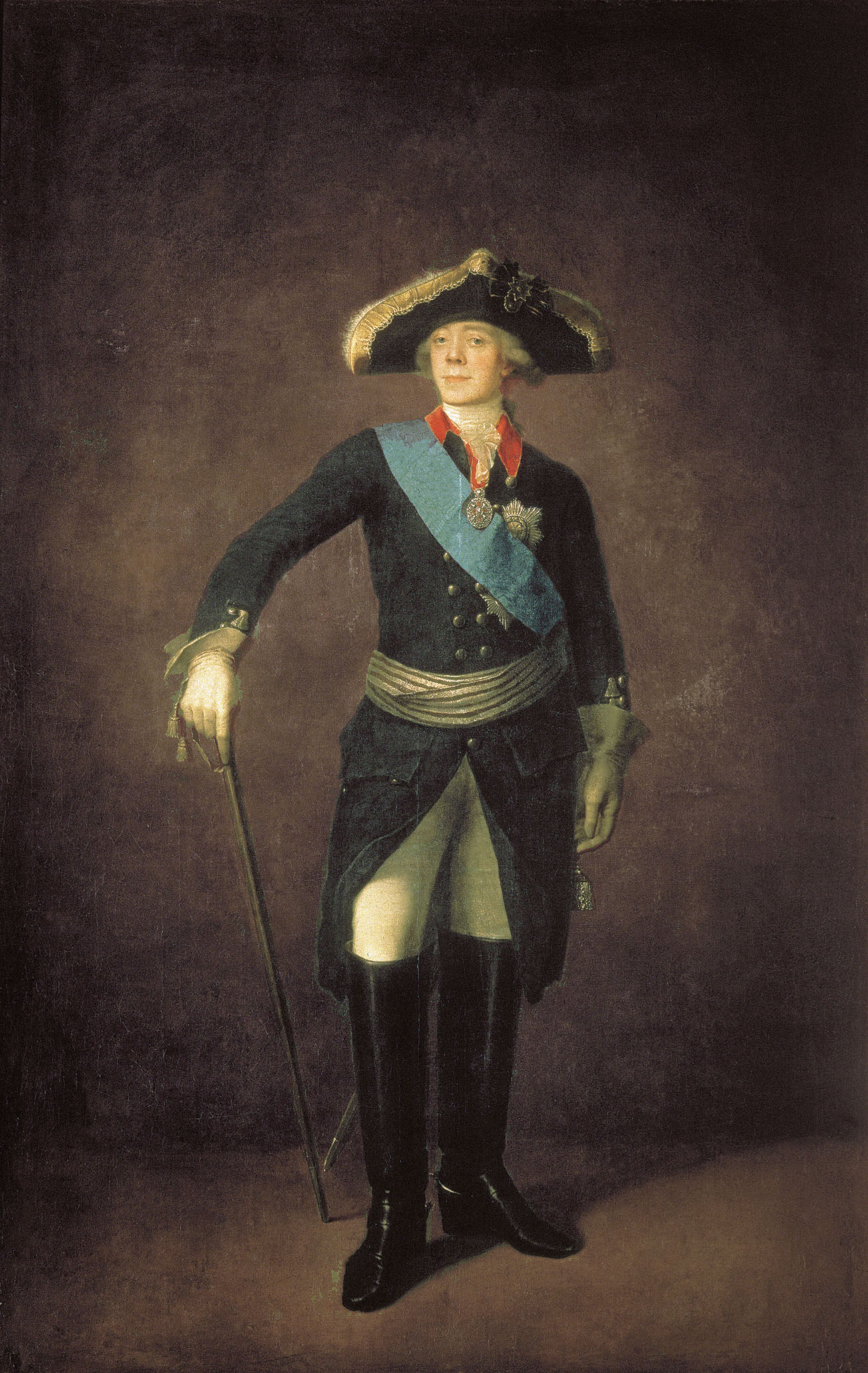
Paul I of Russia, 1797

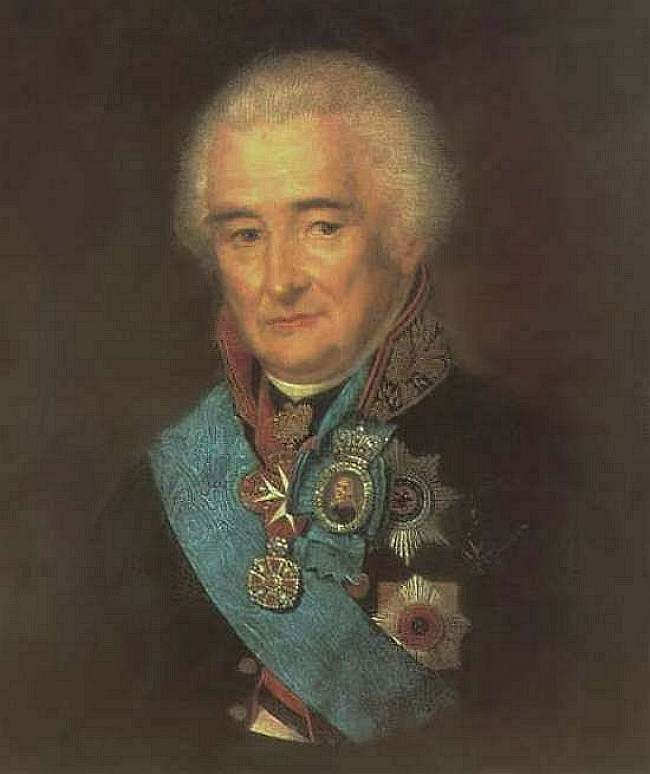
Prince Pyotr Lopukhin, 1801

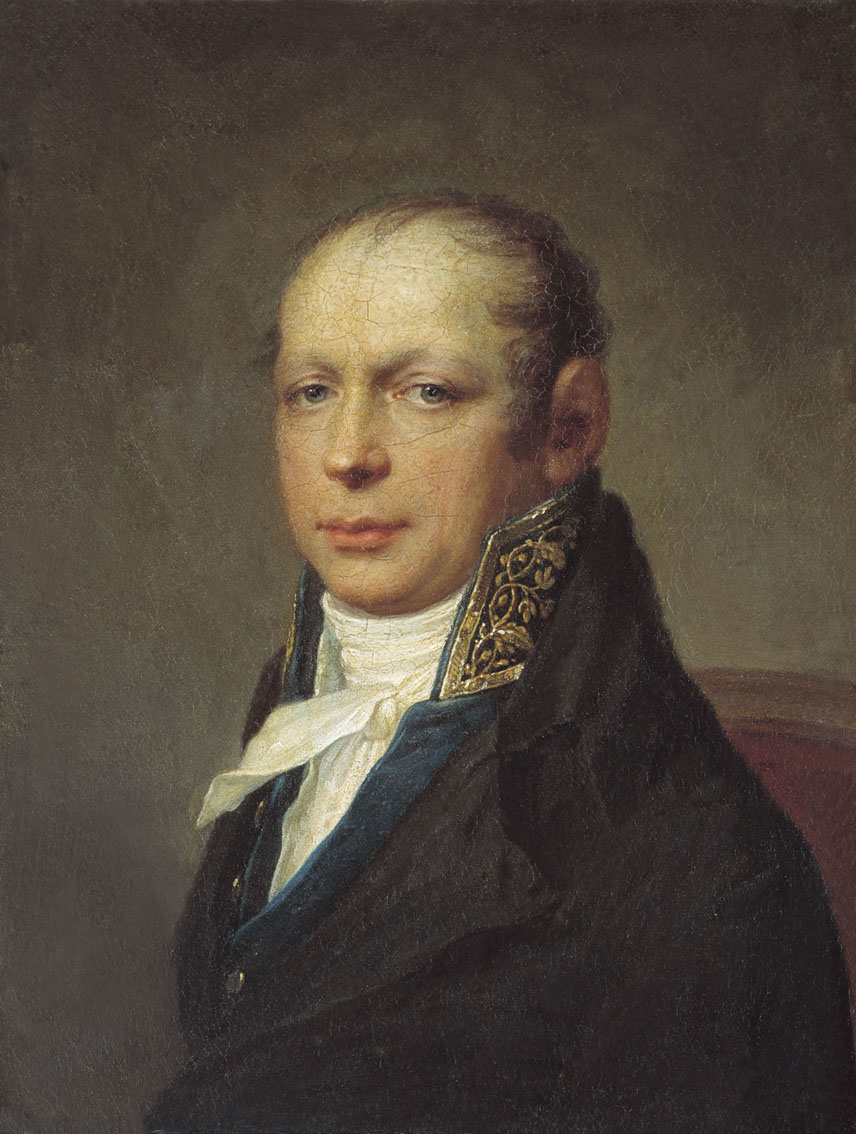
Andreyan Zakharov, c. 1804

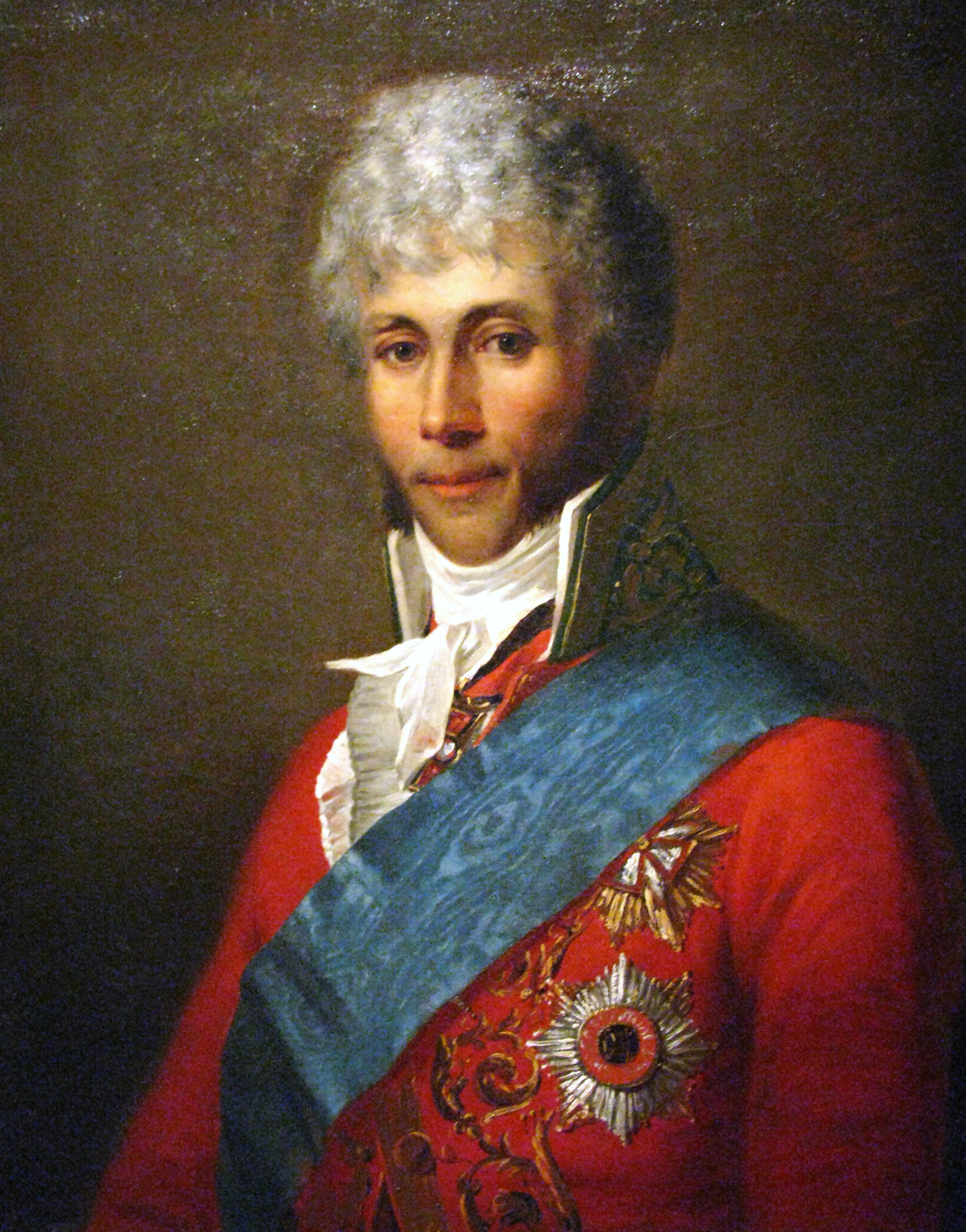
Count Seweryn Potocki, c. 1805

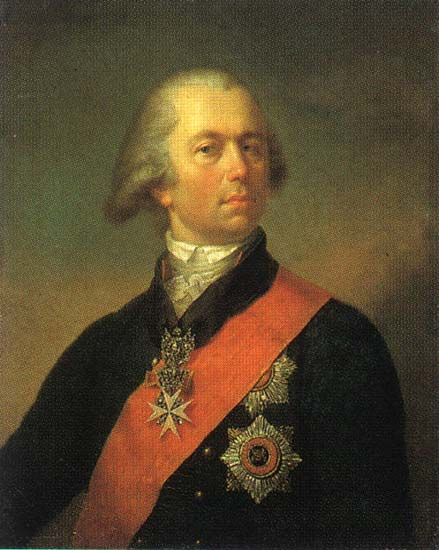
Aleksei Ivanovich Korsakov, 1799

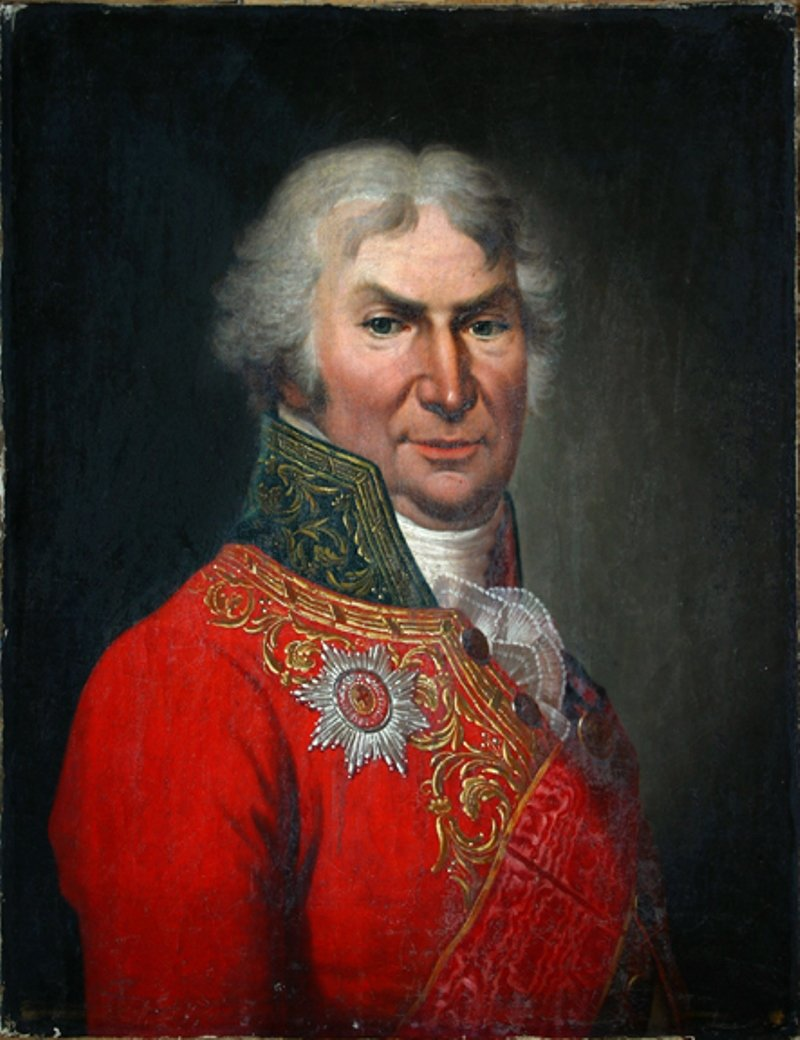
Count Dmitry Khvostov, c. 1808

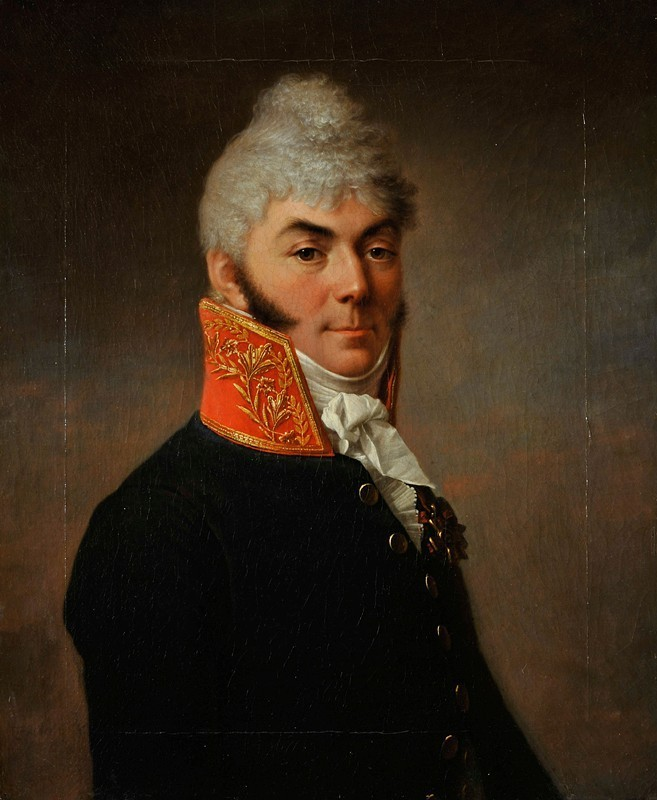
Nikolay Novosiltsev, c. 1808
