= Holy Cross Church, Mahlezan =

Armenian church in Mahlezan, Iran

Holy Cross Church کلیسای مهلذان
- Սուրբ Խաչ Քրիստոսի Եկեղեցի
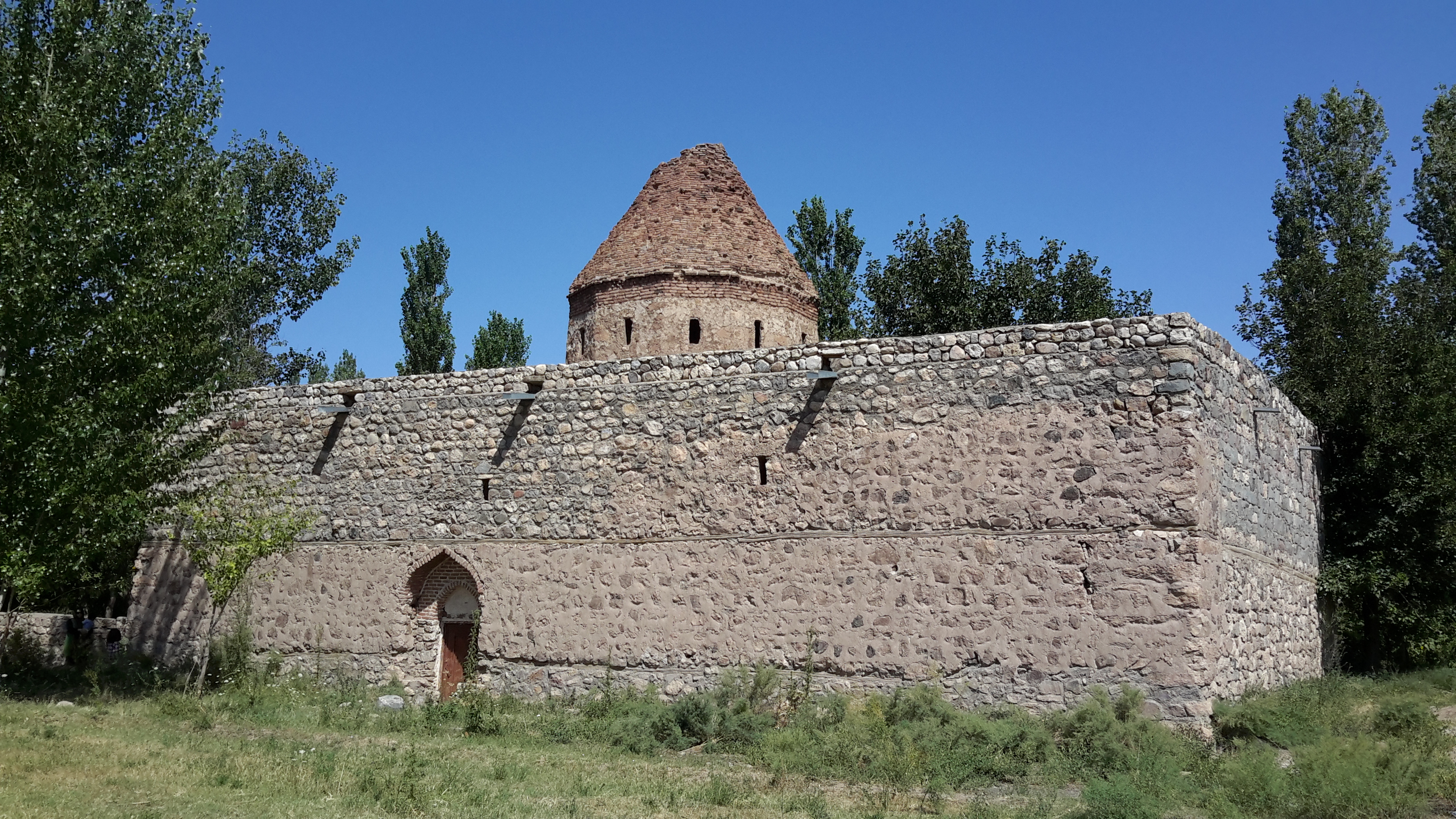
- Holy Cross Church in Mahlezan

- Location within Iran

Religion
- Affiliation: Armenian Apostolic Church
- Rite: Armenian
- Status: Abandoned

Location
- Location: Mahlezan, Iran
- Coordinates: 38.6545833°N 45.08868992°E

Architecture
- Style: Armenian
- Completed: 15th-16th century

Holy Cross Church of Mahlezan (Armenian: Սուրբ Խաչ Քրիստոսի Եկեղեցի; Persian: کلیسای مهلذان) is an Armenian Apostolic church in Mahlezan, Khoy County, West Azerbaijan Province, Iran.

== See also ==
- List of Armenian churches in Iran

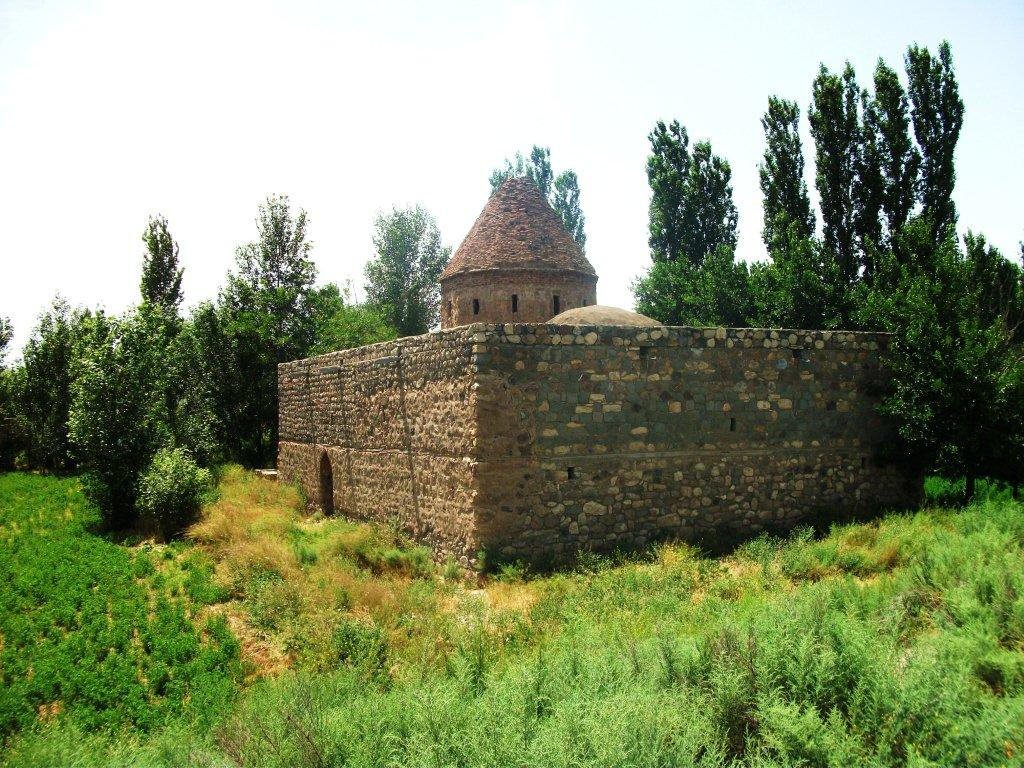
Another view of the church

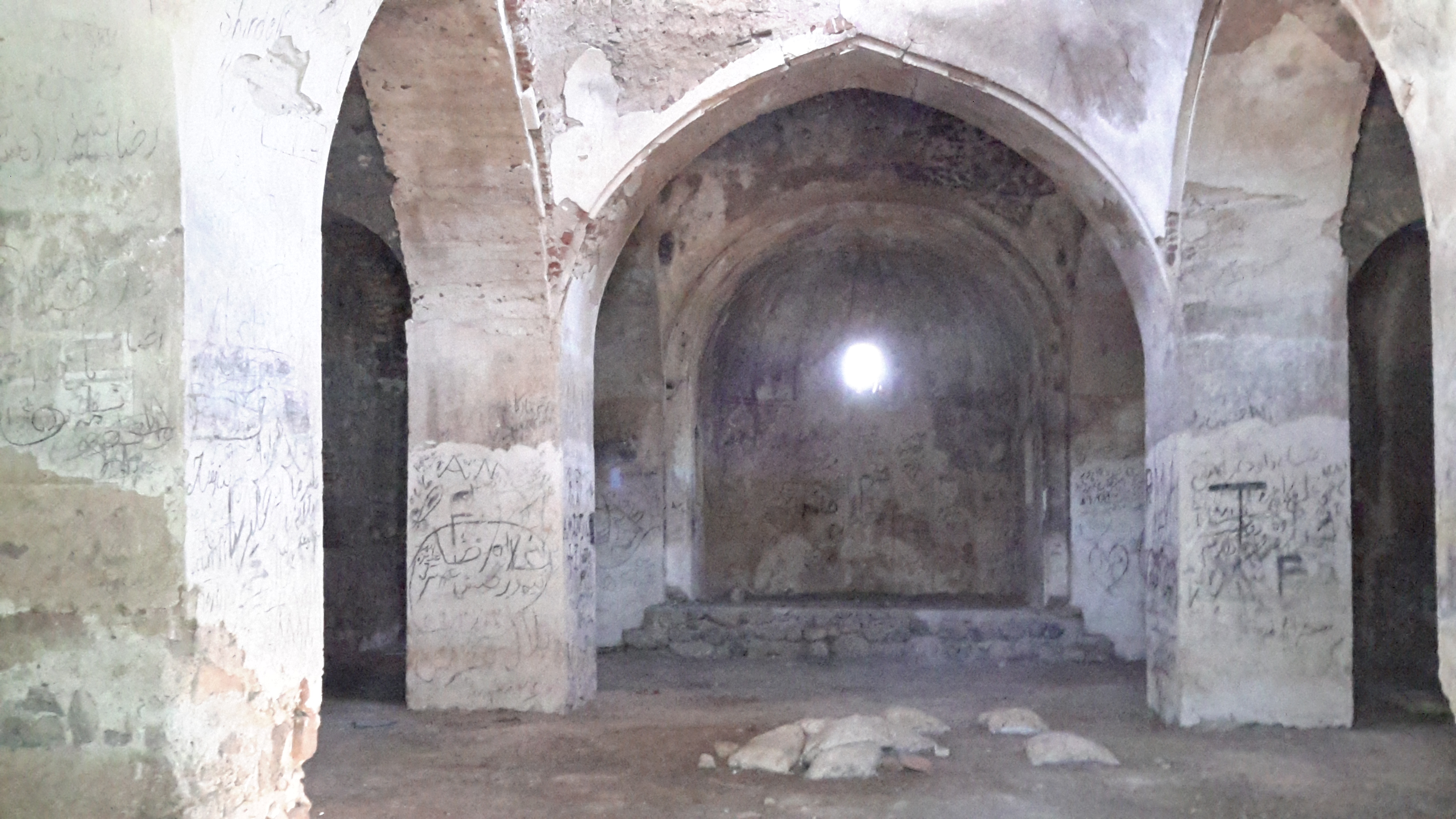
Interior of the church

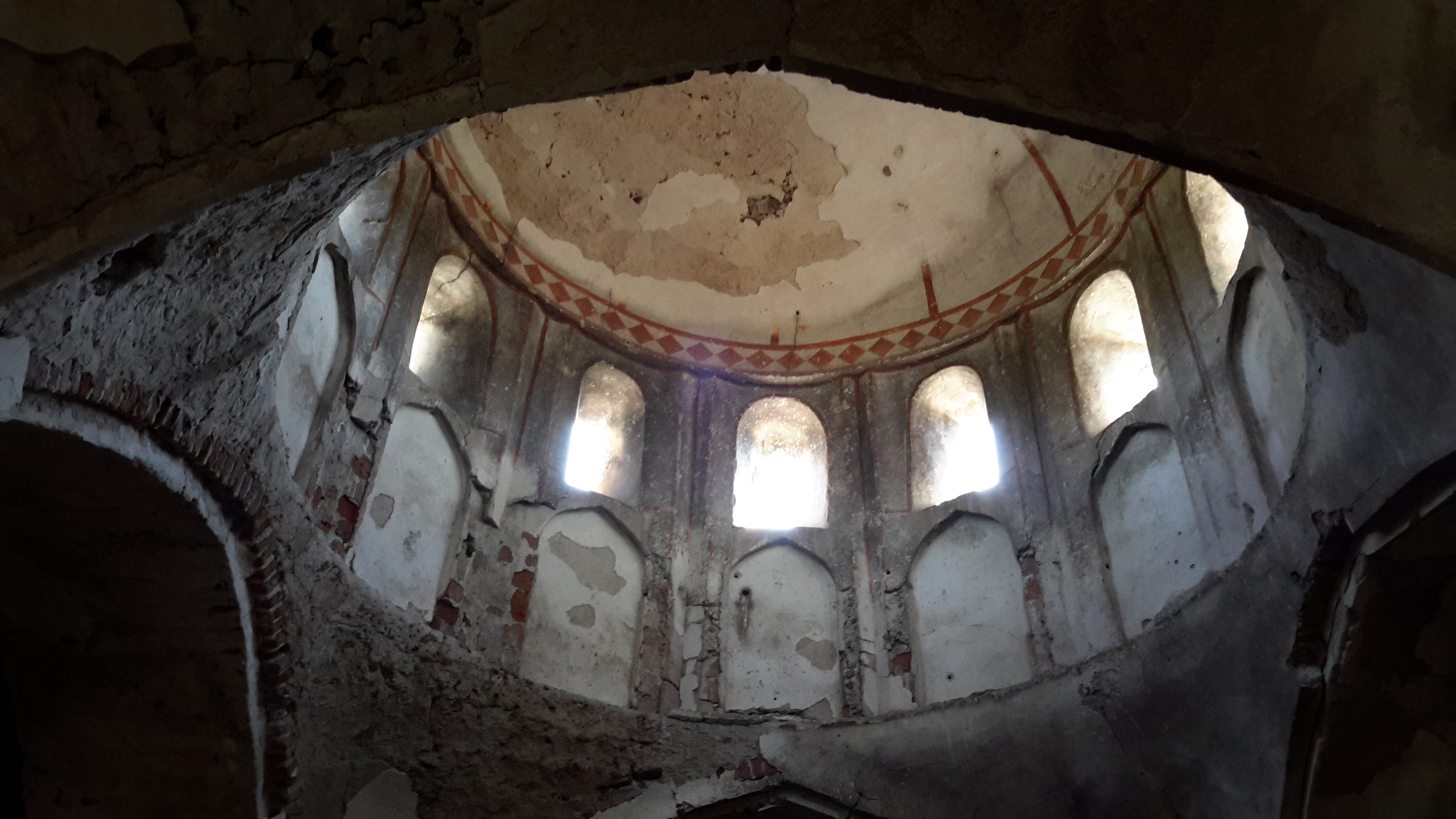
Underneath the dome of the church
