= Ivughli Rural District =

Rural district in West Azerbaijan province, Iran

Ivughli Rural District Persian: دهستان ايواوغلي
- Rural District
- Location within Iran
- Coordinates: 38°43′N 45°09′E
- Country: Iran
- Province: West Azerbaijan
- County: Khoy
- District: Ivughli
- Established: 1987
- Capital: Ivughli

Population (2016)
  - Total: 7,303
- Time zone: UTC+3:30 (IRST)

Ivughli Rural District (Persian: دهستان ايواوغلي) is in Ivughli District of Khoy County, West Azerbaijan province, Iran. It is administered from the city of Ivughli.

== Demographics ==
=== Population ===
At the time of the 2006 National Census, the rural district's population was 8,413 in 2,131 households. There were 8,489 inhabitants in 2,418 households at the following census of 2011. The 2016 census measured the population of the rural district as 7,303 in 2,326 households. The most populous of its 83 villages was Siah Baz, with 2,045 people.

=== Other villages in the rural district ===
- Aghbolagh
- Bileh Var
- Bizandeh
- Etezadiyeh
- Hoseynabad-e Marakan
- Marakan
- Mozaffarabad
- Pir Kandi
- Tappeh Bashi
- Yarim Qayeh
