= Yury Felten =

Russian architect (1730–1801)

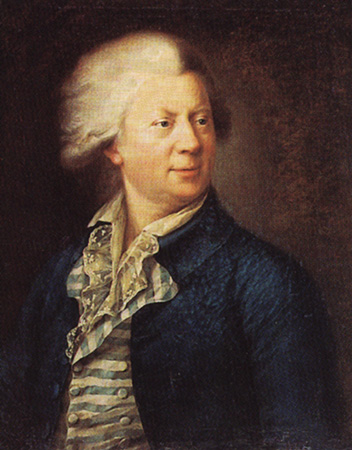
Portrait by Stepan Shchukin, 1786

Georg Friedrich Veldten, also known as Yury Matveyevich Felten (Russian: Ю́рий Матве́евич Фе́льтен; 1730–1801), was a Russian architect who served at the court of Catherine the Great.

== Early life and education ==
Yury Felten was born Georg Veldten, into a family of German immigrants to Russia. His father worked for the Russian Academy of Sciences. Young Yury Felten studied on a Russian State scholarship at the Gymnasium of the Academy of Sciences.

In 1744, after the death of his father, Felten moved to Germany. From 1744 to 1749 he studied at Tübingen University, but his financial and personal situation prompted him to move back to St. Petersburg. Felten wrote a letter to Empress Elizabeth, and she extended her hospitality and a scholarship, so he completed his studies at the Russian Academy, graduating in 1752 as an architect.

== Career ==
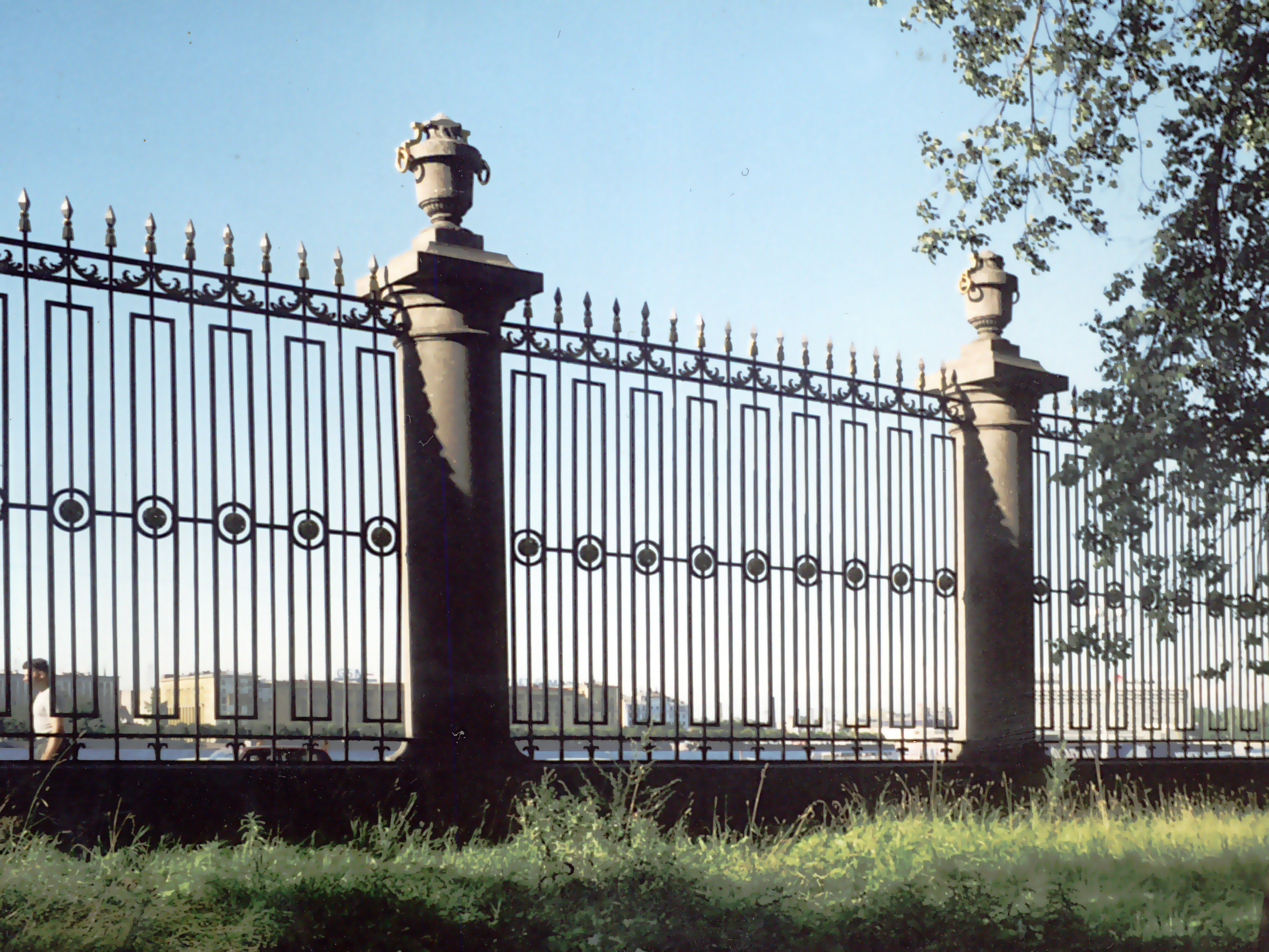
Cast-iron railing of the Summer Garden in St Petersburg

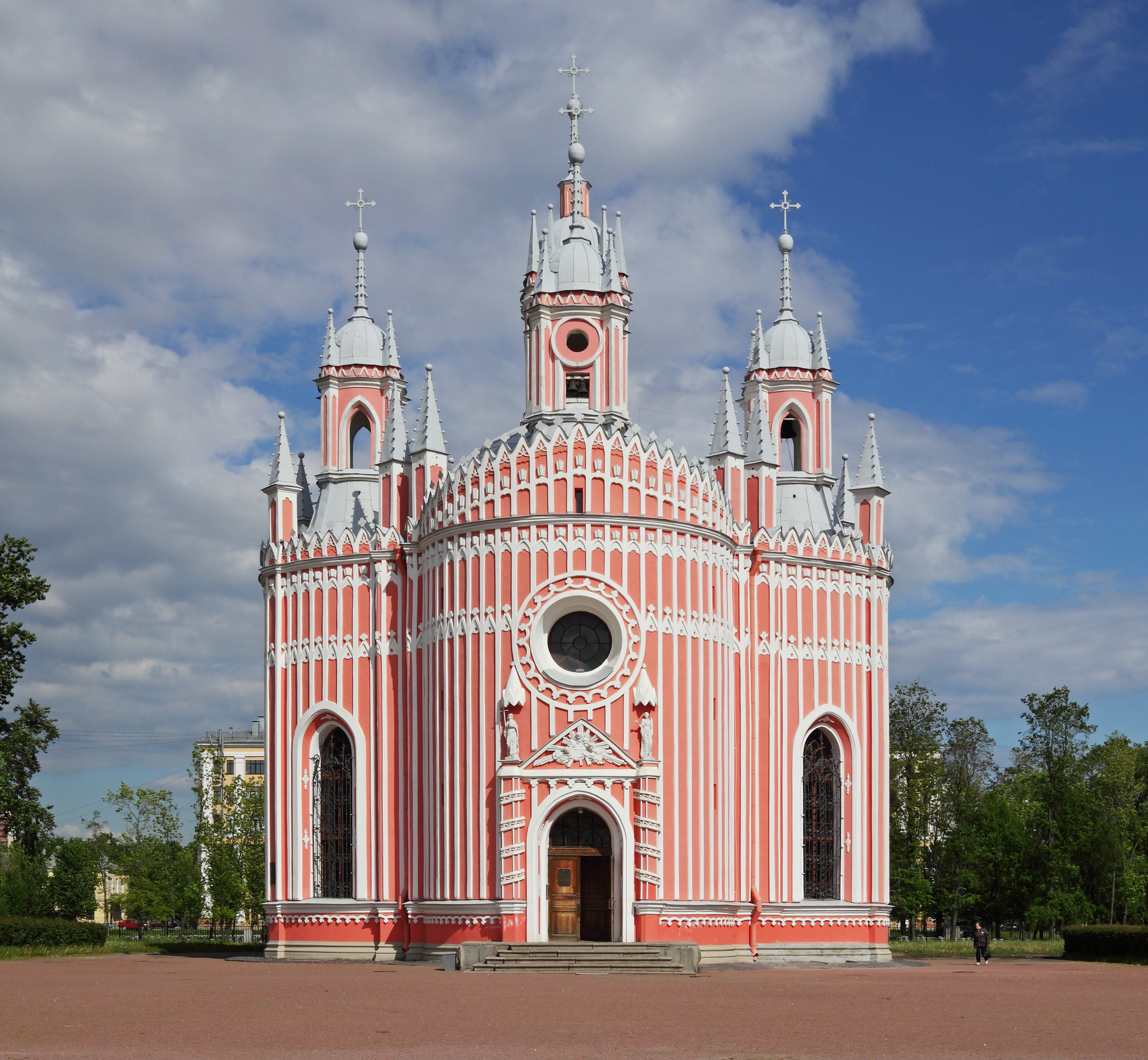
Chesme Church

From 1752 to 1762 Felten worked as assistant to the celebrated architect Bartolomeo Rastrelli during the construction of the Winter Palace and other buildings in and around St. Petersburg. In the 1760s and 1770s he designed a complex ensemble enclosing the south side of Palace Square, now partially incorporated into the present buildings of the General Staff. At the same time, he designed the Old Hermitage, a wing of the growing Hermitage complex on the waterfront, and worked on the winter garden on the roof of the Small Hermitage, as well as extending the museum's galleries.

Yury Felten enjoyed the trust and respect of Empress Catherine the Great. She commissioned much work from him in Tsarskoye Selo, such as the Zubov wing of the Catherine Palace, as well as his contributions at the Winter Palace and elsewhere. He also designed two Lutheran churches in central St. Petersburg, the Chesme Palace (Russian: Чесменский дворец: damaged during the Siege of Leningrad and restored in 1946) and the Church of Saint John at Chesme Palace.

Felten was also an inventor and engineer. He built a heavy-lifting machine that moved the granite rock that became the pedestal of the Bronze Horseman. To this day, the pedestal is the largest stone ever moved by man.

From 1764, Felten taught architecture at the Imperial Academy of Arts. In 1789, he was appointed the director of the Academy, a position he kept for the rest of his life. He died in 1801 in St. Petersburg.

Arguably his best-known work is not a building but the cast-iron railing (1783) on the Neva side of the Summer Garden in St. Petersburg. Another one of his notable buildings is the Annenkirche, Saint Petersburg.

== Sources ==
- "Фельтен, Юрий Матвеевич" . Brockhaus and Efron Encyclopedic Dictionary (in Russian). 1906.
- Yevsina, N. A. (2003). "Fel'ten, Yury (Matveyevich) [Velten, Georg Friderick]". Grove Art Online.
