= Ersi, West Azerbaijan =

Village in West Azerbaijan province, Iran

Ersi Persian: ارسي
- Village
- Location within Iran
- Coordinates: 38°38′08″N 45°06′00″E
- Country: Iran
- Province: West Azerbaijan
- County: Khoy
- District: Ivughli
- Rural District: Valdian

Population (2016)
  - Total: 28
- Time zone: UTC+3:30 (IRST)

Ersi (Persian: ارسي) (Note: Also romanized as Ersī; also known as Ensī) is a village in Valdian Rural District of Ivughli District in Khoy County, West Azerbaijan province, Iran.

== Demographics ==
=== Population ===
At the time of the 2006 National Census, the village's population was 120 in 31 households. The following census in 2011 counted 57 people in 21 households. The 2016 census measured the population of the village as 28 people in nine households.
