= Annenkirche, Saint Petersburg =

Church in Saint Petersburg, Russia

Coordinates: 59.9447°N 30.3519°E

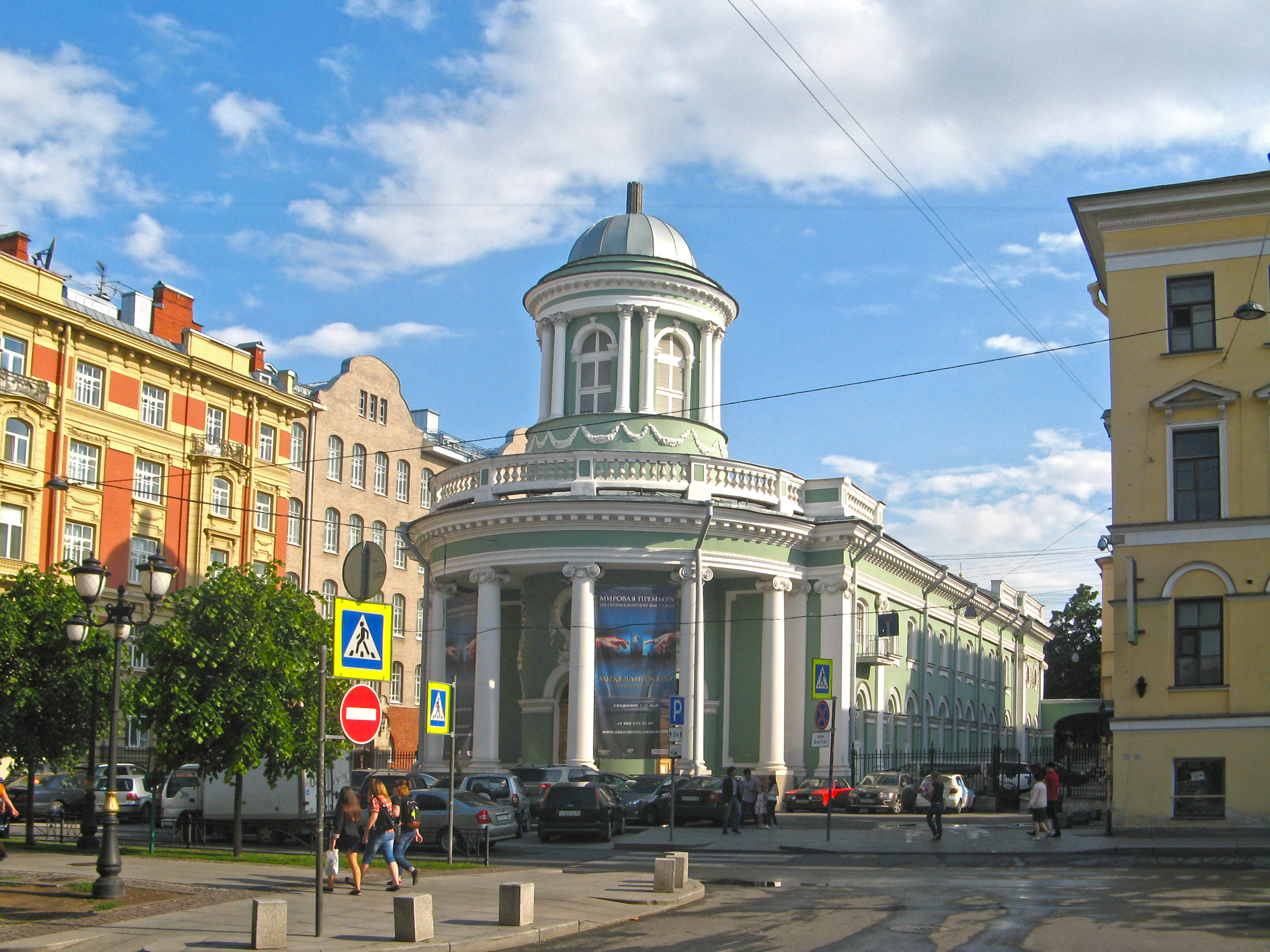
Exterior

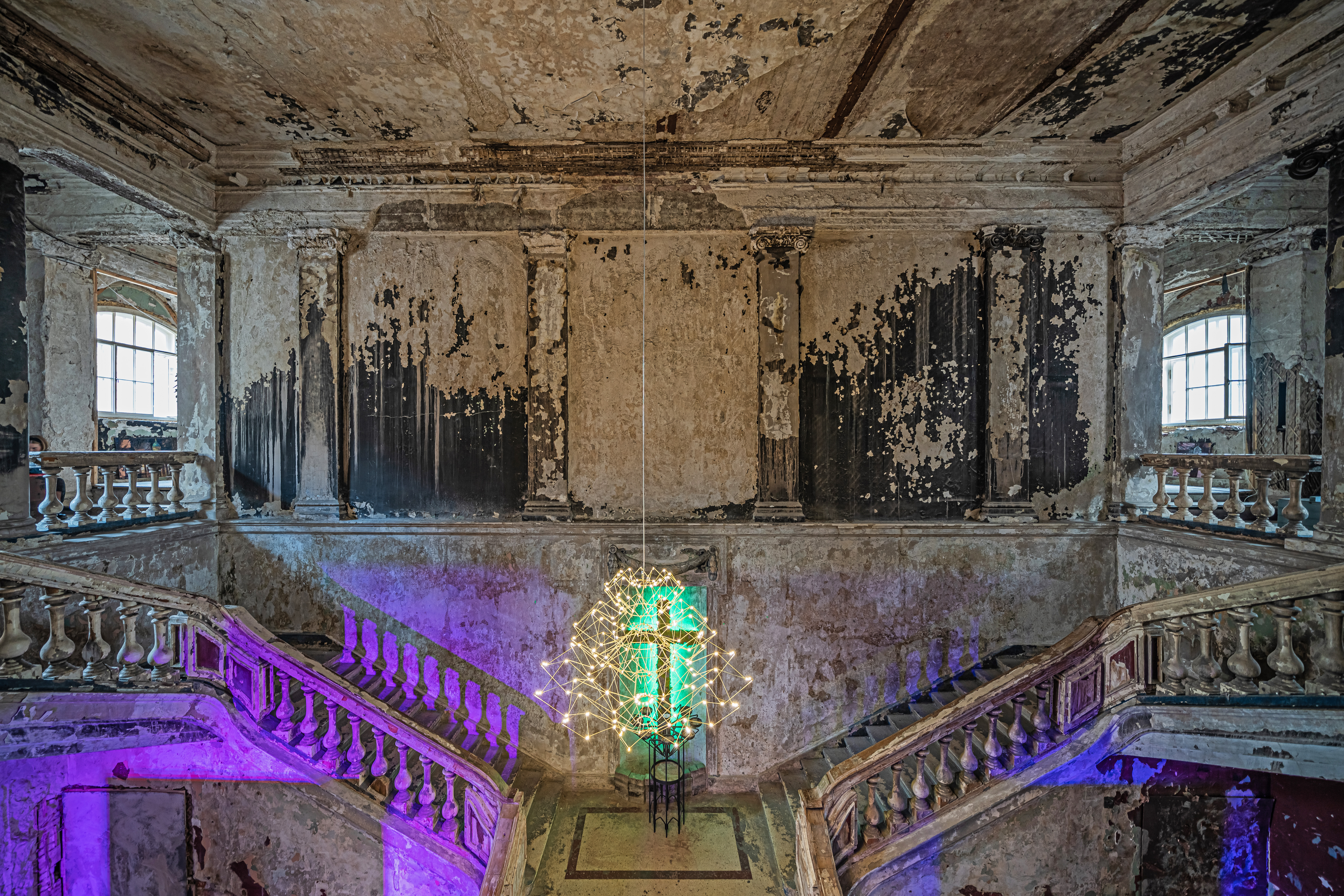
Fire-damaged interior

St. Anne's Church (Annenkirche in German; церковь Святой Анны in Russian) is a Lutheran church in Saint Petersburg, Russia. It was built in 1775-1779 by Georg Friedrich Veldten for the German community in a Neoclassical style with Ionic columns.

After the church was closed in 1935 by the Soviet regime, architect Alexander Gegello had it transformed into a cinema (called Spartak). At the beginning of the 21st century a nightclub opened inside the building and it was damaged by a fire. The building was fully restored for its original purpose in 2012-2013 by the Evangelical Lutheran Church of Ingria, its new owner.

Every Sunday morning, there is a worship service in Russian, and during the school year there is a service in English. Several rooms in the building house exhibitions by modern painters.
