= Valdian Rural District =

Rural district in West Azerbaijan province, Iran

Valdian Rural District Persian: دهستان ولديان
- Rural District
- Location within Iran
- Coordinates: 38°33′N 45°10′E
- Country: Iran
- Province: West Azerbaijan
- County: Khoy
- District: Ivughli
- Established: 1987
- Capital: Mahlezan

Population (2016)
  - Total: 5,636
- Time zone: UTC+3:30 (IRST)

Valdian Rural District (Persian: دهستان ولديان) is in Ivughli District of Khoy County, West Azerbaijan province, Iran. Its capital is the village of Mahlezan. The previous capital of the rural district was the village of Saidabad. It is home to Iran's nuclear facilities.

== Demographics ==
=== Population ===
At the time of the 2006 National Census, the rural district's population was 6,220 in 1,504 households. There were 5,947 inhabitants in 1,745 households at the following census of 2011. The 2016 census measured the population of the rural district as 5,636 in 1,730 households. The most populous of its 11 villages was Valdian, with 1,572 people.

=== Other villages in the rural district ===
- Agheshlu
- Bagh Daraq
- Cheshmeh
- Ersi
- Vishlaq-e Olya
- Vishlaq-e Sofla
- Zarean
