= Chashma =

Chashma may refer to:

- Chashma, Iran, a village in Iran
- Chashma, Kyrgyzstan, a town in Kyrgyzstan
- Chashma, Mianwali, a city in Pakistan
  - Chashma Nuclear Power Plant, Pakistan
- Chashma, Tajikistan
- Chashma (Nurota), a religious site in Nurota, Uzbekistan

== See also ==
- Cheshma (disambiguation)
