= Chesma (rural locality) =

Rural locality in Chelyabinsk Oblast, Russia

Coordinates: 53°48′46″N 60°39′14″E

Chesma (Russian: Чесма; Kazakh: Чесма, Chesma) is a rural locality (a selo) and the administrative center of Chesmensky District, Chelyabinsk Oblast, Russia. Population: 6,517 (2010 census); 5,831 (2002 census); 5,499 (1989 Soviet census).
