= Russian ship Chesma =

At least seven ships of the Imperial Russian Navy have been named Chesma (Russian: Чесма) after the victory during the Battle of Chesma in 1770:

- Russian galley Chesma – 11-gun galley renamed to commemorate the victory; destroyed by fire in 1796
- Russian ship of the line Chesma (1770) – 80-gun ship of the line that participated in the Battle of Patras in 1772; scrapped in 1781
- Russian ship of the line Chesma (1811) – 74-gun ship of the line; broken up 1828
- Russian ship of the line Chesma (1828) – 84-gun ship of the line of the Black Sea Fleet; hulked after 1841
- Russian ship of the line Chesma (1849) – 84-gun ship of the line that fought in the Battle of Sinop in 1853 and was scuttled at Sevastopol two years later during the Crimean War
- Russian battleship Chesma (1886) – Ekaterina II-class battleship of the Black Sea Fleet; stricken in 1907
- Russian battleship Poltava (1894) – Petropavlovsk-class predreadnought battleship captured by the Japanese during the Battle of Tsushima in 1905. Renamed Chesma when she was purchased from Japan during World War I as her original name had been given to a new battleship; broken up in 1924.
