= Cheshmeh, Bushehr =

Cheshmeh
- Village
- Location within Iran
- Coordinates: 29°44′48″N 50°28′29″E
- Country: Iran
- Province: Bushehr
- County: Ganaveh
- Bakhsh: Central
- Rural District: Hayat Davud

Population (2006)
  - Total: 22
- Time zone: UTC+3:30 (IRST)
  - Summer (DST): UTC+4:30 (IRDT)

Cheshmeh (Persian: چشمه) is a village in Hayat Davud Rural District, in the Central District of Ganaveh County, Bushehr Province, Iran. At the 2006 census, its population was 22, in 5 families.
