= Cheshmeh-ye Mulid =

Cheshmeh-ye Mulid چشمه موليد
- Village
- Location within Iran
- Coordinates: 33°11′44″N 59°21′42″E
- Country: Iran
- Province: South Khorasan
- County: Birjand
- Bakhsh: Central
- Rural District: Alqurat

Population (2006)
  - Total: 27
- Time zone: UTC+3:30 (IRST)
  - Summer (DST): UTC+4:30 (IRDT)

Cheshmeh-ye Mulid (Persian: چشمه موليد, also Romanized as Cheshmeh-ye Mūlīd; also known as Cheshmeh and Chashmeh) is a village in Alqurat Rural District, in the Central District of Birjand County, South Khorasan Province, Iran. At the 2006 census, its population was 27, in 10 families.
