= Cheshmeh, Razavi Khorasan =

Cheshmeh چشمه
- Village
- Location within Iran
- Coordinates: 35°52′13″N 59°41′44″E
- Country: Iran
- Province: Razavi Khorasan
- County: Fariman
- Bakhsh: Central
- Rural District: Fariman

Population (2006)
  - Total: 256
- Time zone: UTC+3:30 (IRST)
  - Summer (DST): UTC+4:30 (IRDT)

Cheshmeh (Persian: چشمه) is a village in Fariman Rural District, in the Central District of Fariman County, Razavi Khorasan Province, Iran. At the 2006 census, its population was 256, in 56 families.
