= Cheshmeh, West Azerbaijan =

Village in West Azerbaijan province, Iran

Cheshmeh Persian: چشمه
- Village
- Location within Iran
- Coordinates: 38°35′39″N 45°07′10″E
- Country: Iran
- Province: West Azerbaijan
- County: Khoy
- District: Ivughli
- Rural District: Valdian

Population (2016)
  - Total: 130
- Time zone: UTC+3:30 (IRST)

Cheshmeh (Persian: چشمه) (Note: Also romanized as Chashmeh; also known as Cheshma) is a village in Valdian Rural District of Ivughli District in Khoy County, West Azerbaijan province, Iran.

== Demographics ==
=== Population ===
At the time of the 2006 National Census, the village's population was 159 in 40 households. The following census in 2011 counted 129 people in 38 households. The 2016 census measured the population of the village as 130 people in 37 households.
