= Cheshmeh-ye Salim =

Cheshmeh-ye Salim چشمه سليم
- Village
- Location within Iran
- Coordinates: 27°18′01″N 61°24′13″E
- Country: Iran
- Province: Sistan and Baluchestan
- County: Mehrestan
- Bakhsh: Central
- Rural District: Birk

Population (2006)
  - Total: 25
- Time zone: UTC+3:30 (IRST)
  - Summer (DST): UTC+4:30 (IRDT)

Cheshmeh-ye Salim (Persian: چشمه سليم, also Romanized as Cheshmeh-ye Salīm; also known as Chashmā, Chashmeh ‘Alī, and Cheshmeh) is a village in Birk Rural District, in the Central District of Mehrestan County, Sistan and Baluchestan Province, Iran. At the 2006 census, its population was 25, in 4 families.
