= Chesme Church =

Russian Orthodox church in Saint Petersburg, Russia

Chesme Church Church of St John the Baptist Chesme
- Church of Saint John the Baptist at Chesme Palace
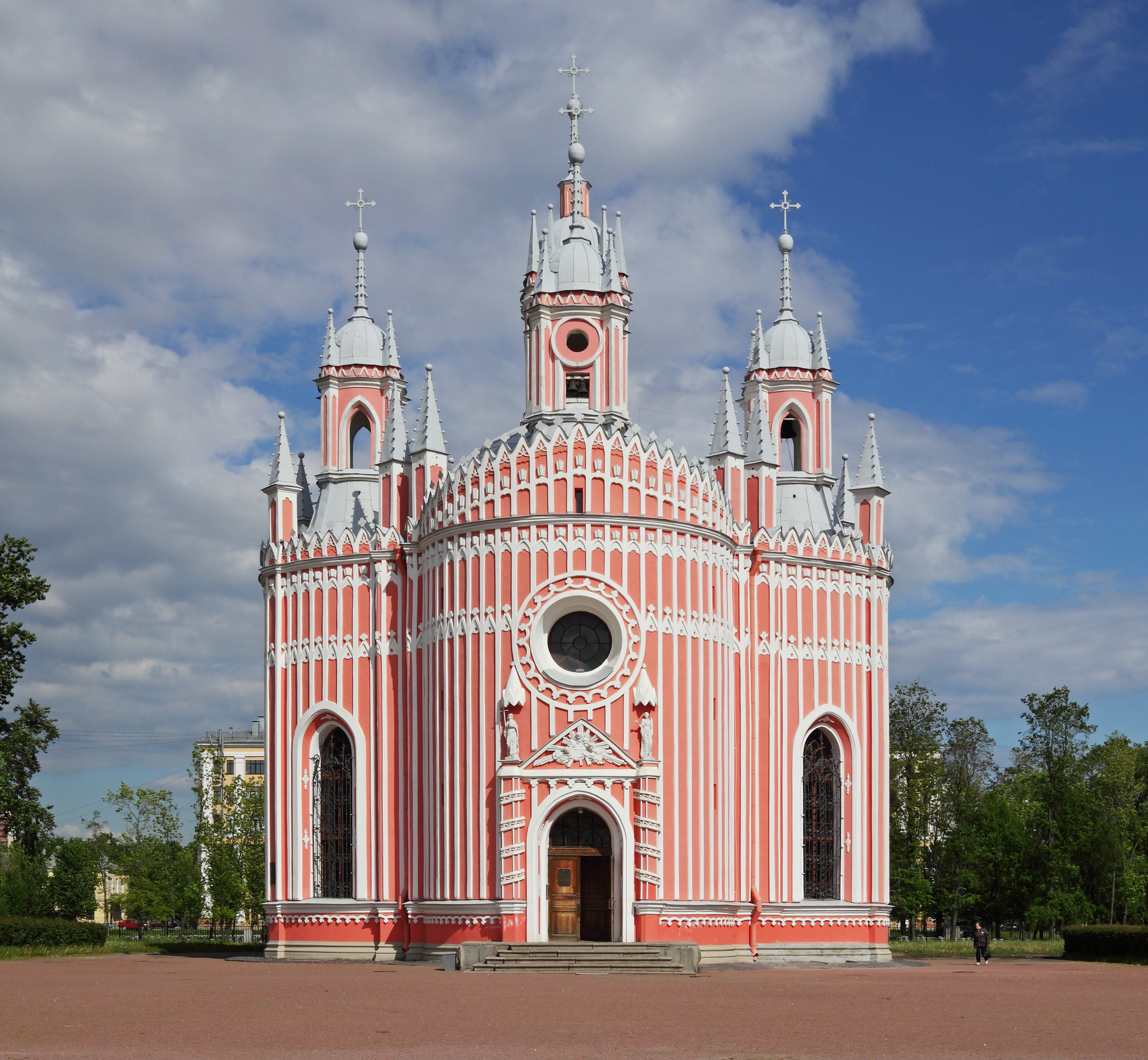
- Church of St John the Baptist Chesme, Russia
- Chesme Church; Church of St John the Baptist Chesme
- 59°51′25″N 30°19′51″E
- Location: Chesme Palace between Saint Petersburg and Sumner Palace also in the Red Village
- Country: Russia
- Denomination: Russian Orthodox Church

History
- Former name: Chesme Church
- Status: Functional
- Founded: 1780
- Founder: Catherine the Great
- Dedication: Russia's 1770 victory over Turkish forces in Chesme Bay
- Consecrated: 24 June

Architecture
- Heritage designation: House church for the Chesme Palace
- Architect: Yury Felten
- Architectural type: Gothic Revival

Specifications
- Materials: Brick with white stone

The Chesme Church (Russian: Чесменская церковь; full name Church of Saint John the Baptist at Chesme Palace, also called the Church of the Nativity of St. John the Baptist, Russian: це́рковь Рождества́ Иоа́нна Предте́чи при Че́сменском Дворце́), is a small Russian Orthodox church at 12 Lensoveta Street, in Saint Petersburg, Russia. It was built by the Russian court architect Yury Felten in 1780, at the direction of Catherine the Great, Empress of Russia. A memorial church, it was erected adjacent to the Chesme Palace (Russian: Чесменский дворец: damaged during the Siege of Leningrad and restored in 1946) between Saint Petersburg and Tsarskoye Selo to commemorate the anniversary of Russia's 1770 victory over Turkish forces in Chesme Bay (Turkish: Çeşme) in the Aegean Sea during the Russo-Turkish War of 1768–1774.

The church and Chesme Palace were the earliest Neo-Gothic constructions in the St Petersburg area. Considered by some to be St Petersburg's single most impressive church, it is a rare example of very early Gothic Revival influence in Russian church architecture.

== Etymology ==
The church was named "The Church of the Birth of St. John the Baptist" as it was consecrated on the birthday of John the Baptist. As it was built to honour the Battle of Chesme which the Russians won in 1770, the church is also popularly known as the "Chesme Church".

== Geography ==
The church is located in Red Village, which was a country estate of the Sergey Poltoratski family, friends of Alexander Pushkin. It is situated in an area that was known as Kekerekeksinen (Finnish for 'frog swamp') which is now in a housing area known as Moskovsky Prospekt, approximately halfway between Park Pobedy and the Moskovskaya metro station. While the church was built at a very ordinary location in 1770, over the centuries, it became part of the city of Saint Petersburg. Located between St. Petersburg and the Summer Palace in Tsarskoye Selo, it served as a traveler's resting place.

== History ==
In 1777, King Gustav III of Sweden attended the laying of the church's foundation. The church was built between 1777 and 1780. It is a memorial church to honour the 1770 Russian victory at the Battle of Chesme. Empress Catherine II chose the site as it was here that she got the news of the Russian victory over the Turks. Joseph II, Holy Roman Emperor was present at the church's consecration.

The knights of the Order of St. George were also in possession of the church at some point when it was given the third name, "St. George's Church".

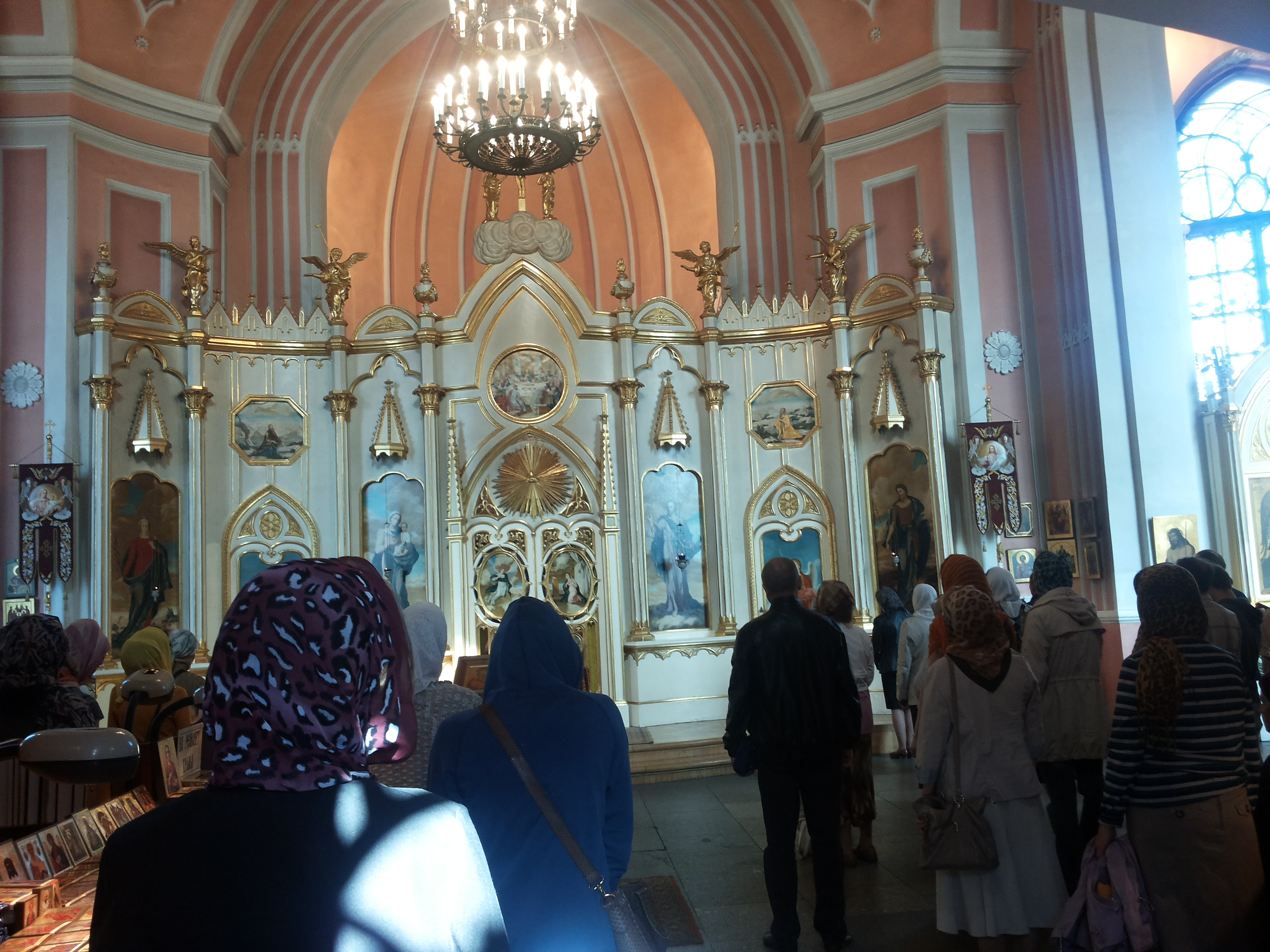
Chesme Church in Saint Petersburg, interior nowadays (2014)

The church and the Chesme Palace became a labour camp when the Soviet government occupied it. In 1923, the church was closed and used as a storehouse. Between 1941 and 1945, the church suffered damages during the "Great Patriotic War". During the Second World War, the Institute of Aviation Technology took possession of the Church and the Chesme Palace. During 1970–1975, it was fully restored under the supervision of the architects M.I. Tolstov and A.P. Kulikov. In 1977, the church became a museum of the Battle of Chesme (with artifacts from the Central Naval Museum). Religious control was restored to the Russian Orthodox Church in 1991, and regular church services have been held at the church since then.

== Architecture ==
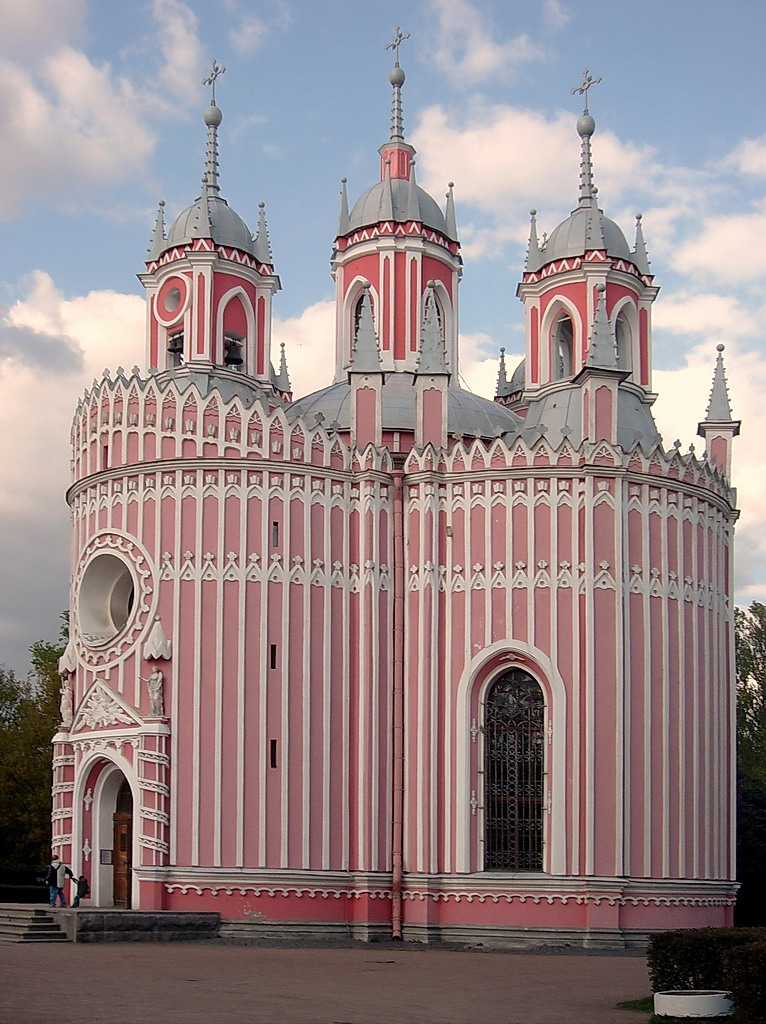
Close architectural view of the Chesme Church

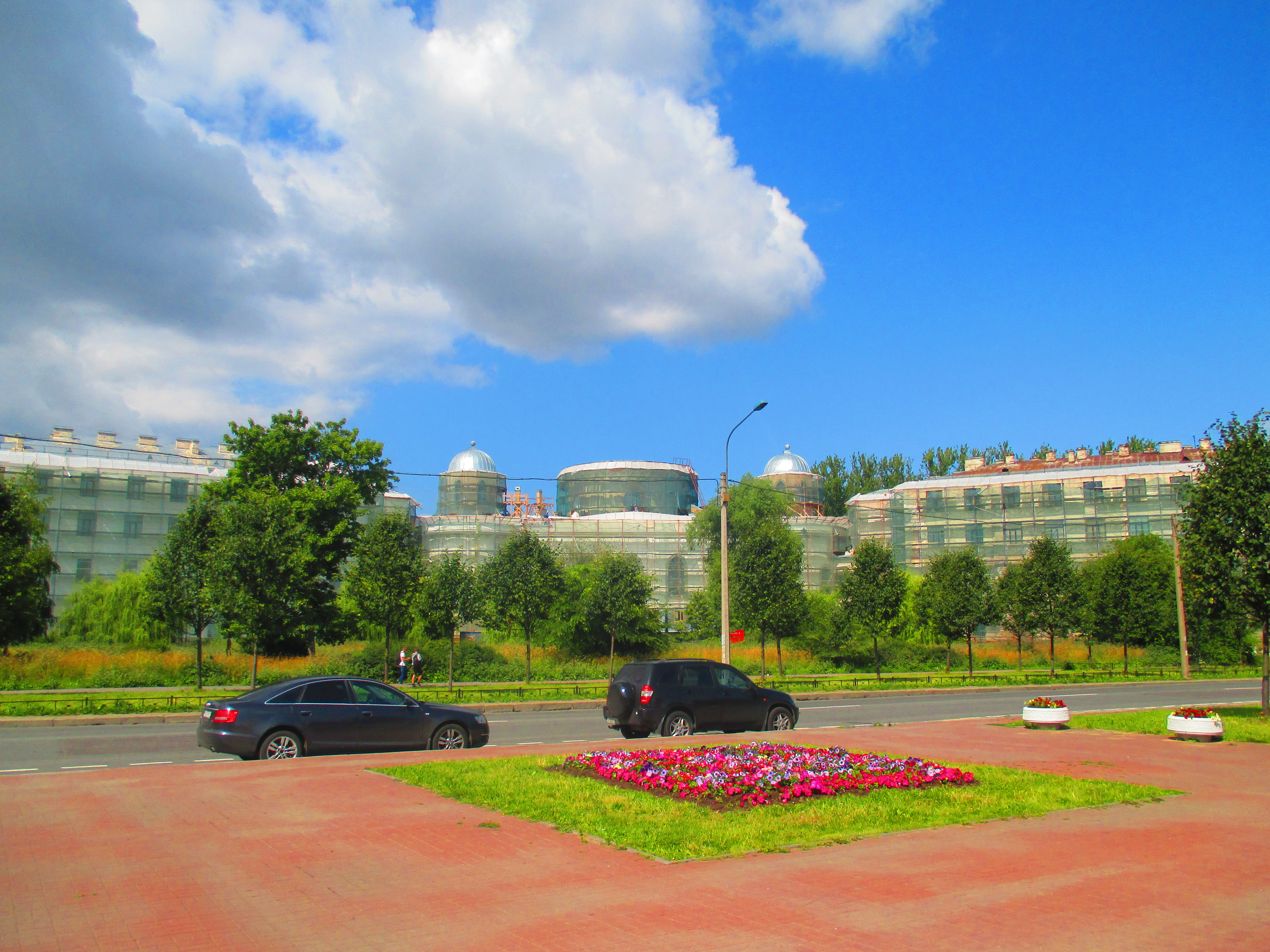
Chesme Palace opposite Chesme Church - under reconstruction (2015)

The church, built in Gothic Revival style faces southwest. Painted pink and white, the church appears like a "candy cone, with long, vertical white stripes (embossed vertical string cornices drawn together with figured horizontal fascias) giving the impression that it's rising straight up from the earth like a mirage and shooting upwards". The church was built by Yury Felten who was the court architect to Catherine the Great.

The inspiration for adopting the pseudo-Gothic style of architecture was a symbol of "the exoticism of the Turkish architecture but also reflected the Anglomania that significantly influenced the design of Catherine's palaces and the parks surrounding them". While the Chesme Palace was built on these lines, the Church of John the Baptist was also built in a similar style. This style introduced during Catherine's time came in vogue in Russia in the subsequent centuries as well. It is also said that the choice of the Gothic Revival architecture style was indicative of "triumph for ancient northern virtues in the spirit of the crusaders".

The church was built with brick and white stone. It has a "quatrefoil" layout in the form of four semi cylinders with barrel vaults. Finials, spires and lancet windows were built over it, and the edifice emerged as a fusion of Gothic and neo-Gothic motifs. The quatrefoil design was common in the late 17th century in many private estate churches and the style was known as the "Moscow baroque". During the 18th century, its adoption during Catherine's reign was considered an experimentation reflecting "the increasing secularization of the upper nobility". The entrance to the church has a neo-Gothic Rose window and a round window above it. The entrance portal has sculptures of angels. The main tower and four small towers have small domes, which are replacements of the traditional onion domes commonly seen in Russia. The walls are striped and crenellated. The impressive relief design on the top of the walls is also in the form of crenellated parapet with pinnacles. There is also a 100 kilograms (220 lb) bell in one of the towers. It also has lancet windows and doorways. The interior, which originally had Italian icons, was destroyed in a fire in 1930. However, it was restored when the church was refurbished. Inside the church, there are many iconic paintings and one particular painting of interest is that of Christ's arrival in Nazareth. When it was a naval museum, there was a vivid painting, in rich colours, depicting the sea battle and Russian victory over the Turks, in place of the "Christ the saviour in the iconostasis-less altar apse". Nothing remains of the original interiors.

The exterior views of the church are impressive. The lanterns on the roof are stated to be similar to those seen on the Gothic temple at Stowe House.

== Grounds ==
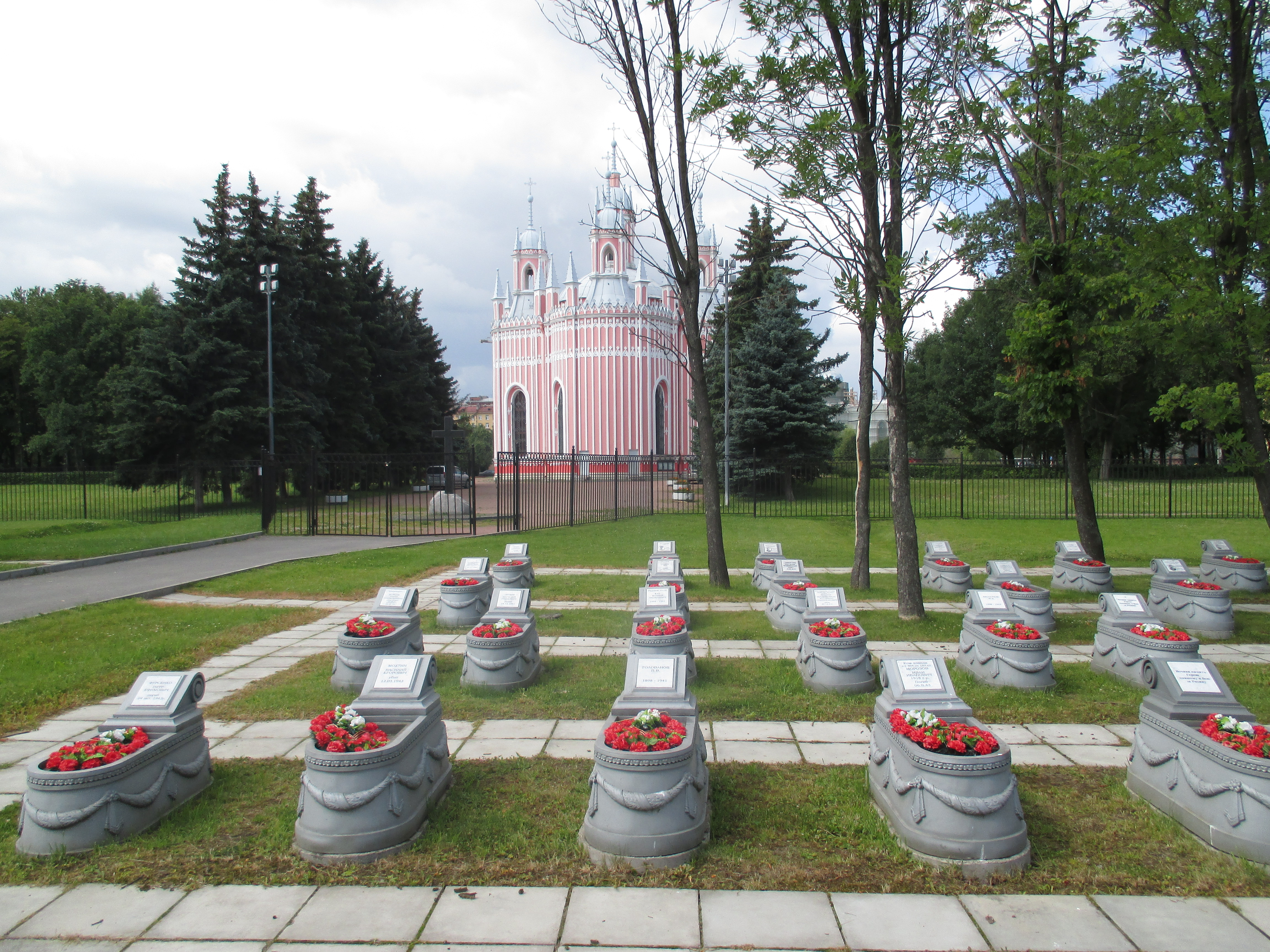
Chesmenskoe War Veterans' Cemetery and Chesme Church in Saint Petersburg

The church precincts have been used as a resting place for war heroes since the time of its consecration and during the Siege of Leningrad. The cemetery is known as the "Chesmenskoe War Veterans' Cemetery", and contains unnamed graves dated 1812–1944 of those who died in Russian wars.

== Notable people ==
The coffin of Russian mystic Grigori Rasputin rested in Chesme Church before his burial at Tsarskoye Selo in 1916.
