= Chesmensky District =

Chesmensky District Чесменский район (Russian)
- District
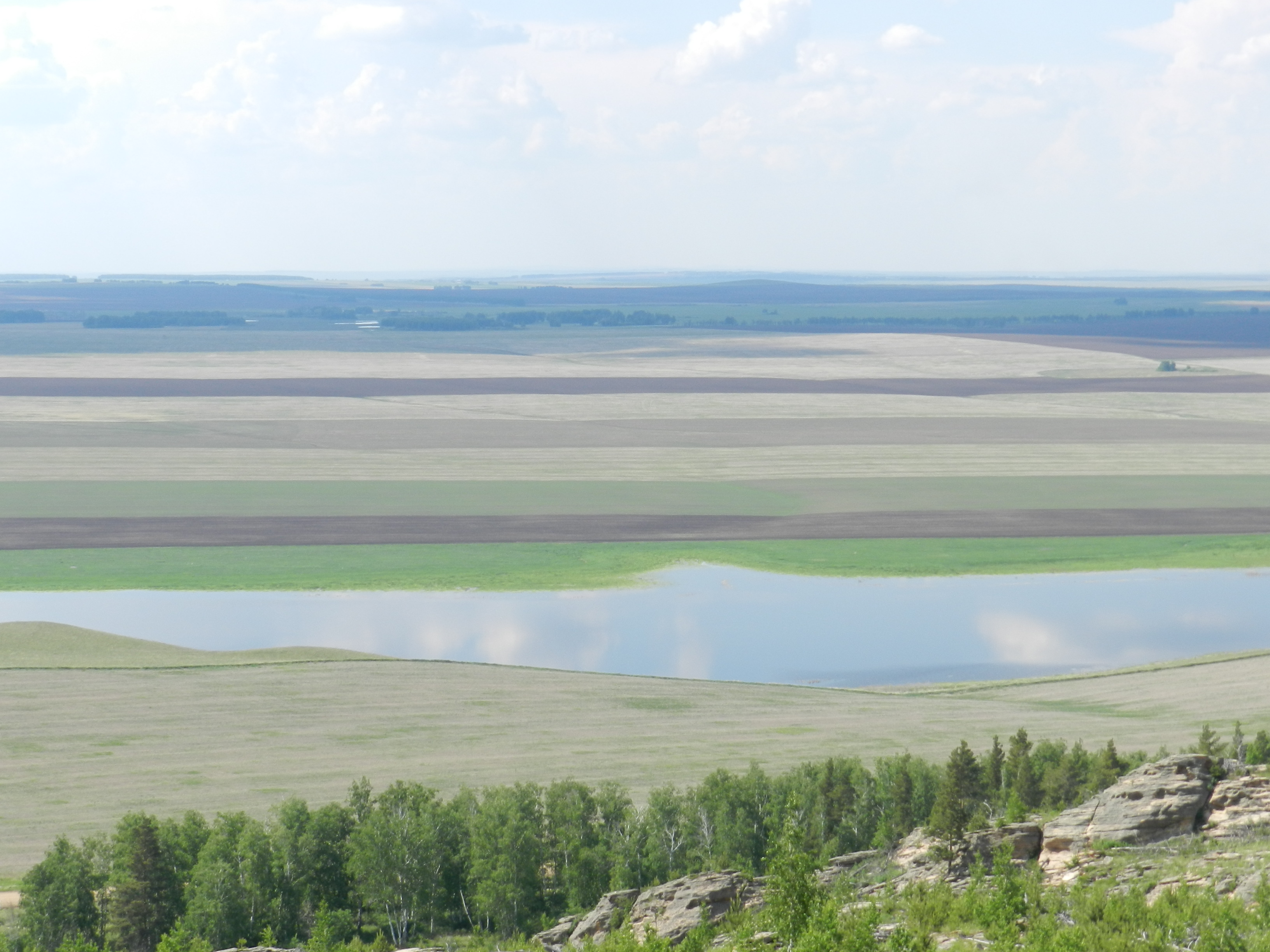
- Chernoborsky Reserve, Chesmensky District

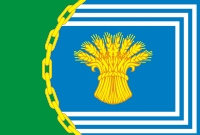
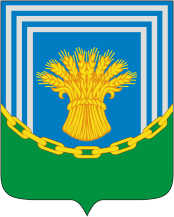
- Flag Coat of arms
- Location of Chesmensky District in Chelyabinsk Oblast
- Coordinates: 53°48′40″N 60°39′00″E
- Country: Russia
- Federal subject: Chelyabinsk Oblast
- Administrative center: Chesma

Area
  - Total: 2,663 km^{2} (1,028 sq mi)

Population (2010 Census)
  - Total: 20,185
  - Density: 7.580/km^{2} (19.63/sq mi)
  - Urban: 0%
  - Rural: 100%

Administrative structure
  - Administrative divisions: 12 selsoviet
  - Inhabited localities: 32 rural localities

Municipal structure
  - Municipally incorporated as: Chesmensky Municipal District
  - Municipal divisions: 0 urban settlements, 12 rural settlements
- Time zone: UTC+5 (MSK+2)
- OKTMO ID: 75659000
- Website: http://www.chesma74.ru/

Chesmensky District (Russian: Чесменский райо́н) is an administrative and municipal district (raion), one of the twenty-seven in Chelyabinsk Oblast, Russia. It is located in the southeast of the oblast. The area of the district is 2,663 square kilometers (1,028 sq mi). Its administrative center is the rural locality (a selo) of Chesma. Population: 20,185 (2010 census); 20,459 (2002 Census); 19,638 (1989 Soviet census). The population of Chesma accounts for 32.3% of the district's total population.
