= Ivughli District =

District in West Azerbaijan province, Iran

Ivughli District Persian: بخش ایواوغلی
- District
- Location within Iran
- Coordinates: 38°38′N 45°10′E
- Country: Iran
- Province: West Azerbaijan
- County: Khoy
- Established: 1996
- Capital: Ivughli

Population (2016)
  - Total: 16,259
- Time zone: UTC+3:30 (IRST)

Ivughli District (Persian: بخش ایواوغلی) is in Khoy County, West Azerbaijan province, Iran. Its capital is the city of Ivughli.

== Demographics ==
=== Population ===
At the time of the 2006 National Census, the district's population was 17,915 in 4,522 households. The following census in 2011 counted 17,603 people in 5,081 households. The 2016 census measured the population of the district as 16,259 inhabitants in 5,055 households.

=== Administrative divisions ===
Ivughli District Population
Administrative Divisions	2006	2011	2016
Ivughli RD	8,413	8,489	7,303
Valdian RD	6,220	5,947	5,636
Ivughli (city)	3,282	3,167	3,320
Total	17,915	17,603	16,259
RD = Rural District
