= Guro =

Guro may refer to:

- Ero guro, a Japanese art movement focusing on eroticism and the grotesque
- Guro, the Filipino word for "teacher", a teacher of Filipino martial arts; derived from the Sanskrit word guru
- Guro-dong, a dong (neighborhood) in Guru-gu, Seoul
- Guro-gu, a gu (district) in Seoul, South Korea
- Guro station, a railway and subway station in Seoul, South Korea
- Guro language, Mande language of Côte d'Ivoire

== People ==
- Elena Guro (1877–1913), Russian artist and writer
- Guro Angell Gimse (born 1971), Norwegian politician
- Guro Fjellanger (1964–2019), Norwegian politician
- Guro Kleven Hagen (born 1994), Norwegian violinist
- Guro Knutsen, Norwegian football player
- Guro Reiten (born 1994), Norwegian association football player
- Guro Skumsnes Moe (born 1983), Norwegian musician
- Guro Strøm Solli (born 1983), Norwegian cross country skier
- Guro Valen (1960–2014), Norwegian professor of medicine
- Guros (1905–1981), Armenian artist
- Đuro or Ǵuro, a given name
