= Goris =

City in Syunik, Armenia

Goris Գորիս
- Town
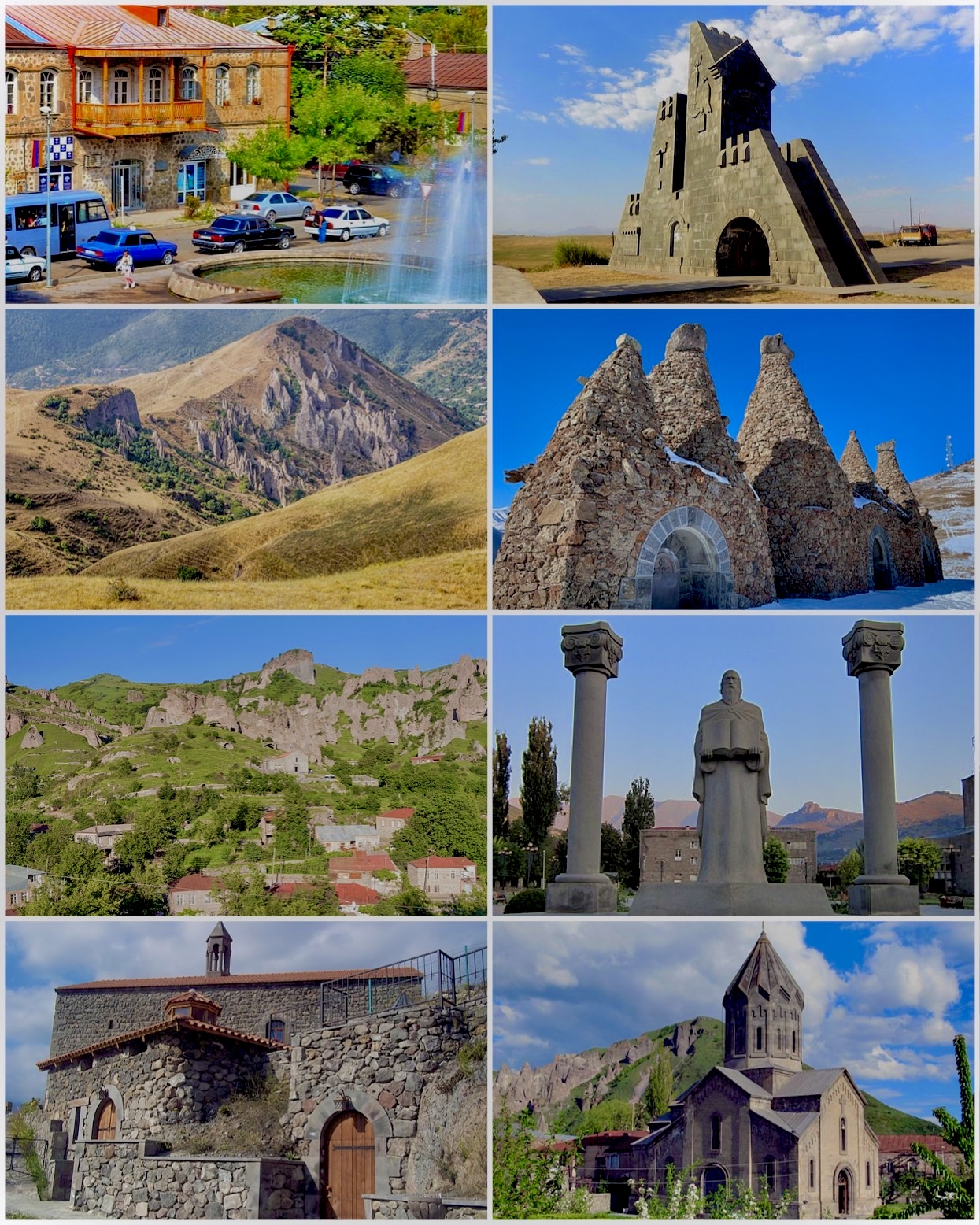
- From top left: Downtown Goris • Goris gate Zangezur Mountains around Goris; Bell Monument • Settlement of old Kores; Grigor Tatevatsi statue Surp Hripsimé Basilica • Saint Gregory Cathedral

- Location within Armenia Location within Syunik Province
- Coordinates: 39°30′28″N 46°20′19″E
- Country: Armenia
- Province: Syunik
- Municipality: Goris
- Established: 1870

Government
  - Mayor: Arush Arushanyan

Area
  - Total: 8 km^{2} (3.1 sq mi)
- Elevation: 1,250–1,520 m (4,100–4,990 ft)

Population (2022)
  - Total: 17,113
  - Density: 2,100/km^{2} (5,500/sq mi)
- Time zone: UTC+4 (AMT)
- Area code: +374(284)
- Website: Official website

Goris (Armenian: Գորիս [ɡɔˈɾis]) is a town and the centre of the Goris Municipality in the Syunik Province in southern Armenia. Located in the valley of the Goris (or Vararak) River, it is 254 kilometres from the Armenian capital Yerevan and 67 kilometres from the provincial capital Kapan. Goris is the second largest city in Syunik in terms of population. As of the 2022 census, it had a population of 17,113, down from the 20,591 reported in the 2011 census. Goris is the seat of the Diocese of Syunik of the Armenian Apostolic Church.

Goris is considered one of the most important historical and cultural sites of Armenia. It is often regarded as the cultural center of Syunik. Because of this, it is a favored tourist destination for both local and foreign travelers and has a large number of hotels and inns.

== Etymology ==
Throughout its history, Goris has been known as Kores and Gorayk. However, there are several explanations for the origin of the name. It is supposed that the name Goris is derived from the Indo-European prelanguage words "gor" (rock), "es" (to be), i.e. Goris/Kores meaning a rocky place. There was a dwelling in the ancient times in the same area of the town.

The name Goris had many variants including: Goristsa, Kores, Gores, Gorayk, Goru, and Geryusy. Kyores is the variant used by locals.

== History ==
=== Ancient history and Middle Ages ===
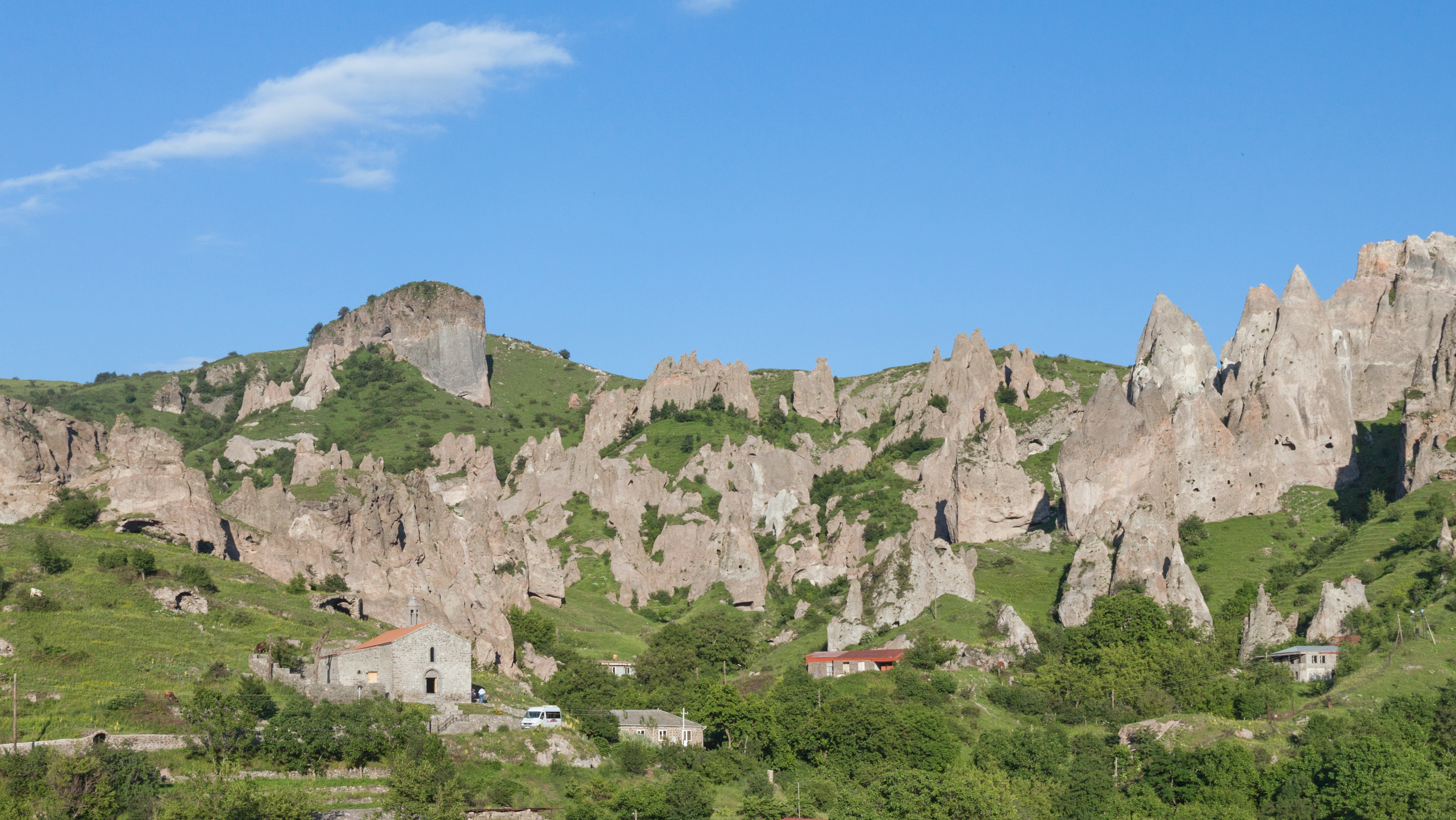
The settlement of old Kores

The area of Goris has been settled since the Stone Age. Goris is likely first mentioned by name in the Urartian period. King Rusa I of Urartu, who reigned between 735 and 713 BC, left a cuneiform inscription where Guria or Goriaya is mentioned as one of the 23 countries conquered by him, which some scholars connect with Goris.

During the Middle Ages, the settlement was situated in the eastern part of the present Goris, on the left bank of Goris river. It was called Kores and coincided with one of the villages of Goru and Gorayk mentioned by Stepanos Orbelian in his 13th-century work History of the Province of Syunik.

Between the 12th and 15th centuries, Syunik along with the rest of the historic territories of Armenia suffered greatly from the Seljuk, Mongol, Aq Qoyunlu and Kara Koyunlu invasions.

=== Persian rule ===
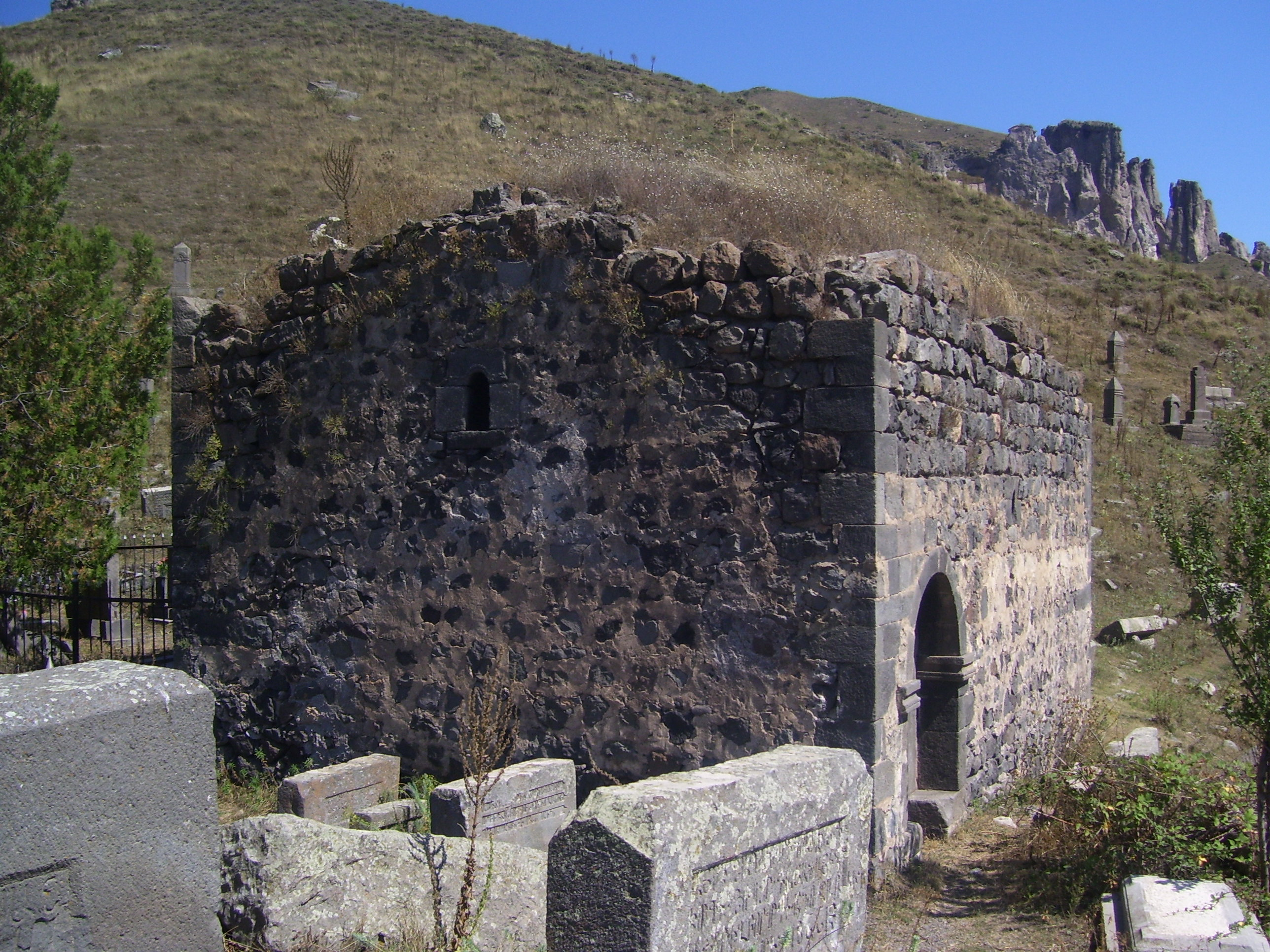
Melik’s Church in Goris

At the beginning of the 16th century, Syunik became part of the Erivan Province within the Safavid Persia. The current spelling of the name was first mentioned in 1624, in a manuscript by a certain Barsegh Yerets. In the 17–18th centuries the princes Melik Husenyans ruled the region around Goris.

At the beginning of the 18th century, the region was the centre of the Armenian liberation campaign led by David Bek against Safavid Persia and the invading Ottoman Turks. In 1750, the region became part of the newly formed Karabakh Khanate.

At the beginning of the 19th century, many territories of Armenia, including the region of old Kores of Syunik, became part of the Russian Empire as a result of the Treaty of Gulistan signed on 24 October 1813 between Russia and Qajar Iran following the Russo-Persian War of 1804–13.

=== Russian rule ===
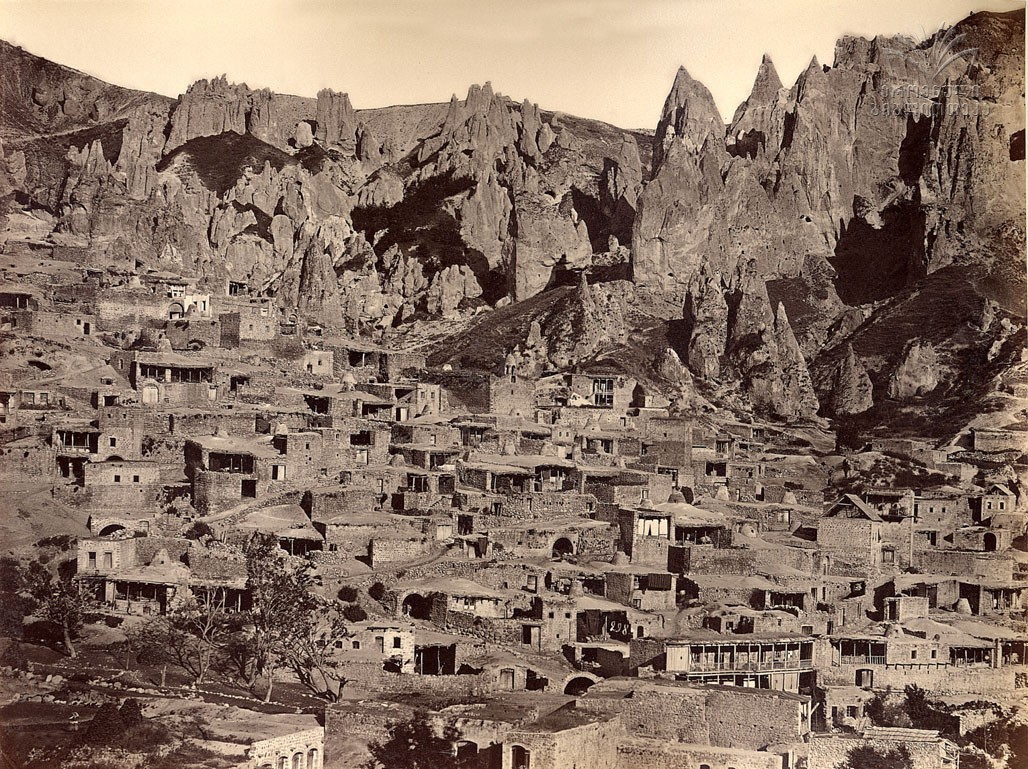
The city of Old Goris before 1898

Under Russian rule, the town of Goris (then called Gerusy) was founded in 1870 to become the centre of Zangezur uezd within the Elizavetpol Governorate of the Russian Empire. In 1876, by the initiative of the uezd governor Staratsky, the recommendation of Prince Manuchar-Bek Melik Huseinyan and using a city plan designed by a German architect, the construction of new Goris was completed near the old town of Kores. By the end of the 19th century, the economic and cultural life of the town had greatly improved through the foundation of a new covered sunday market attracting merchants and artisans, private schools, factories, a printing house, and roads leading to Sisian and Shushi.

=== Brief independence (1918–1921) ===
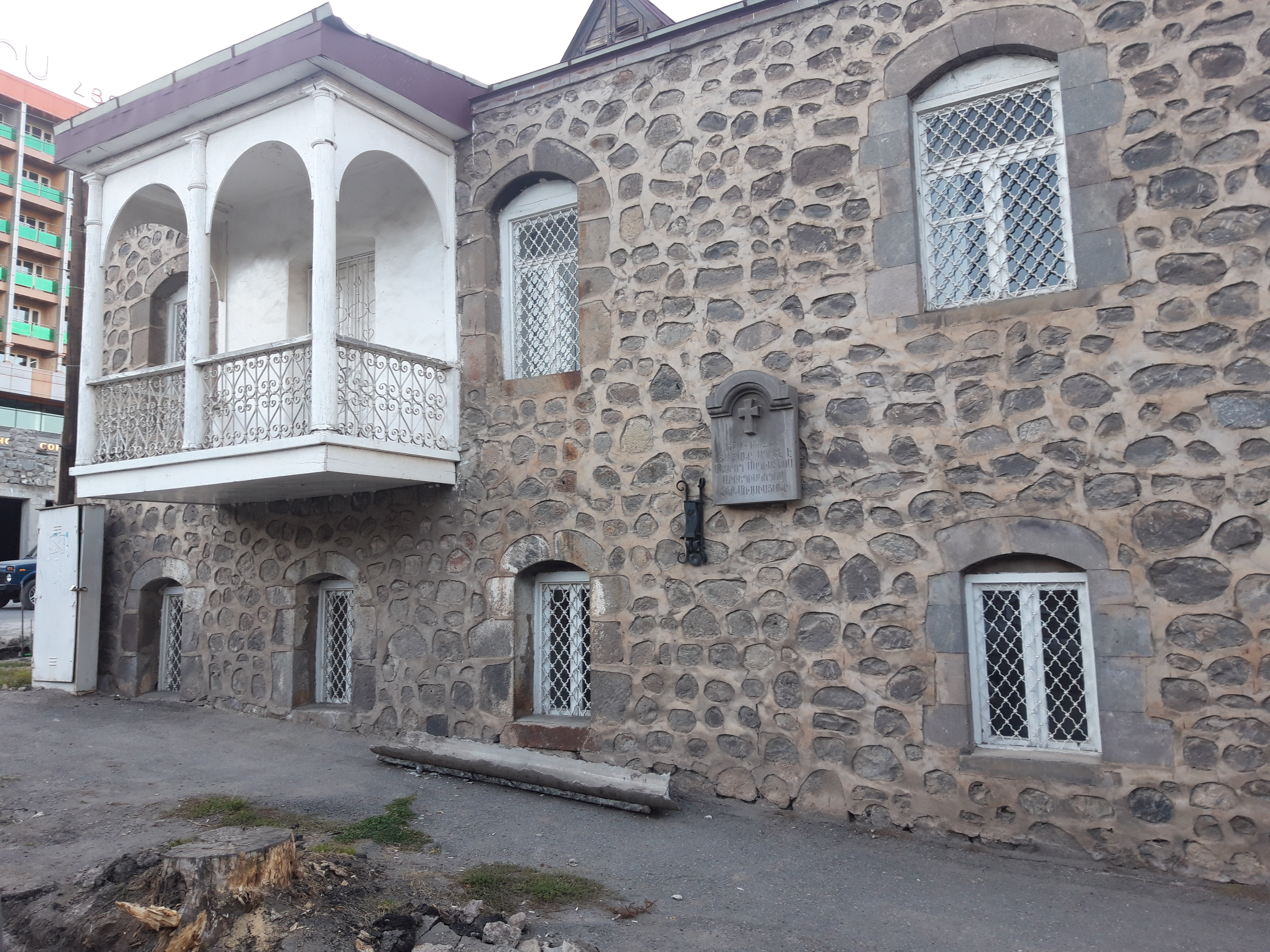
A 19th-century building in Goris

With the establishment of the Republic of Armenia in 1918, Goris was included within the Zangezur gavar ("district"). However, after the fall of the First Republic of Armenia in 1920, the 2nd Pan-Zangezurian congress held in Tatev on 26 April 1921 declared the independence of the self-governing regions of Daralayaz (modern-day Vayots Dzor Province), Zangezur, and parts of Nagorno-Karabakh under the name of the Republic of Mountainous Armenia (Lernahaystani Hanrapetutyun), with Goris as its de facto capital city. Led by Garegin Nzhdeh, the self-proclaimed republic had a short life. The Red Army conducted massive military operations in Syunik during June–July 1921. As a result of fierce battles, the Republic of Mountainous Armenia capitulated on 13 July 1921, following the promises of Soviet authorities to keep Zangezur within the borders of Soviet Armenia.

=== Soviet era ===
As part of the Soviet Union, Goris served as the regional centre of the Zangezur district of the Armenian SSR. Following Zangezur's Sovietization, Goris native Axel Bakunts returned to the town, where he worked as an agronomist until moving to Yerevan in 1926. With the establishment of the Goris raion in 1930, the town became the regional centre of the newly founded district.

During Nikita Khrushchev's Thaw, the economy of the city was boosted with the construction of many hydroelectric power plants in the area. Several new industrial firms were opened, and many modern residential districts were founded. A model of Soviet achievement in Zangezur, Goris attracted several prominent visitors, including Soviet Armenian statesman Anastas Mikoyan.

In 1967, Goris State Institute of Pedagogy was opened as a branch of the Armenian State Pedagogical University. In 1970, Goris was granted the status of a "city of republican subordination" within Soviet Armenia.

=== Post-independence ===
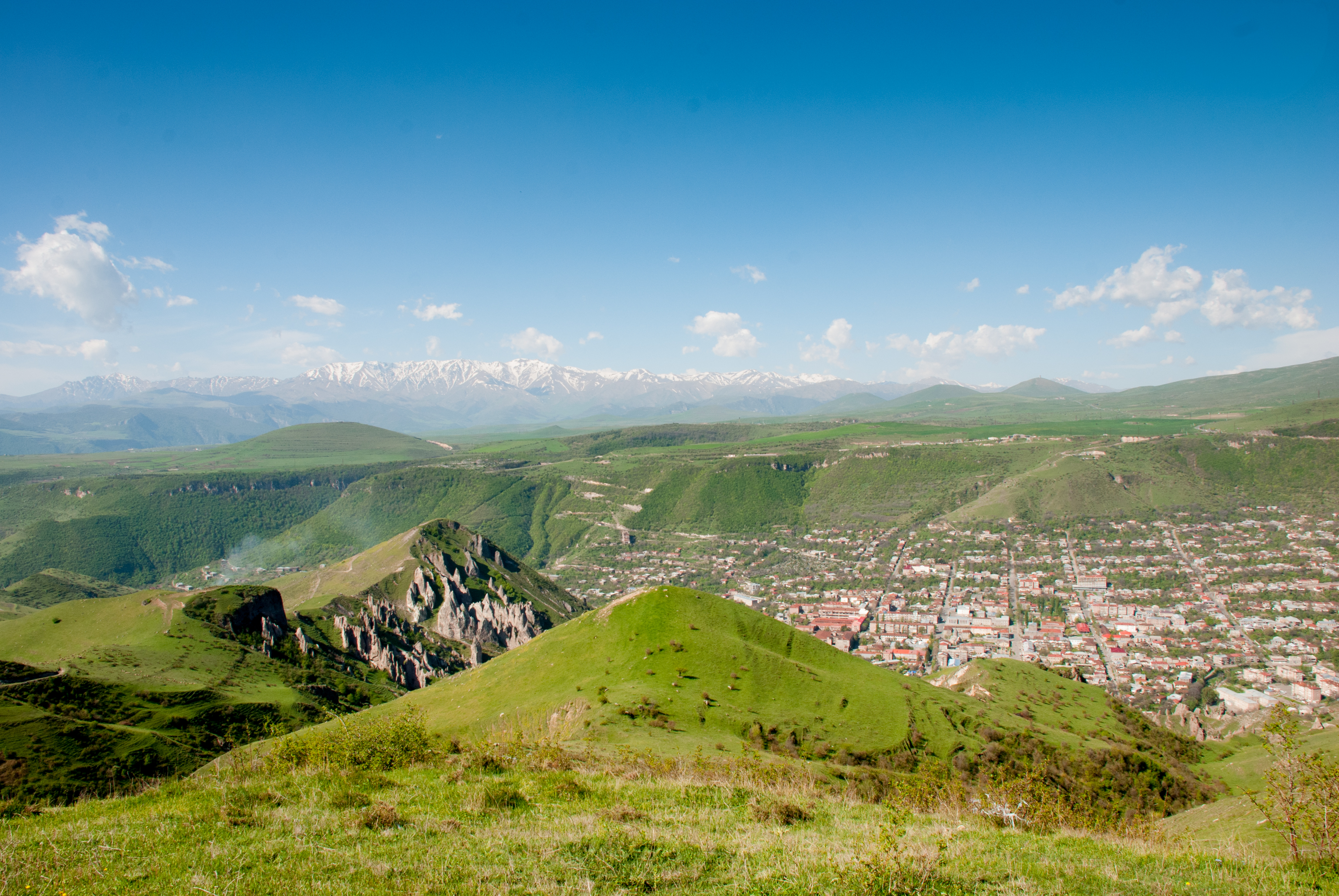
Goris in 2014

After the independence of Armenia, Goris was included within the newly formed Syunik Province as per the 1995 administrative reform.

In 2006, the Goris State Institute of Pedagogy was restructured and turned into Goris State University to become the largest educational institute of Syunik.

As a result of community mergers in 2016, the municipality of Goris was enlarged to include 9 of its nearby villages.

In September 2022, Goris as well as several other Armenian towns, including Vardenis (Gegharkunik Province), Jermuk (Vayots Dzor Province) and Sotk (Gegharkunik), came under attack by Azerbaijani Armed Forces. Many residential houses were damaged as a result of the shelling; people were displaced from their homes.

From 24 September to 2 October 2023, over 100,000 Armenians from Nagorno-Karabakh fled into Armenia, with Goris being the primary destination for refugees. The local theatre was converted into a Red Cross base in order to provide aid to the incoming refugees.

== Geography and climate ==
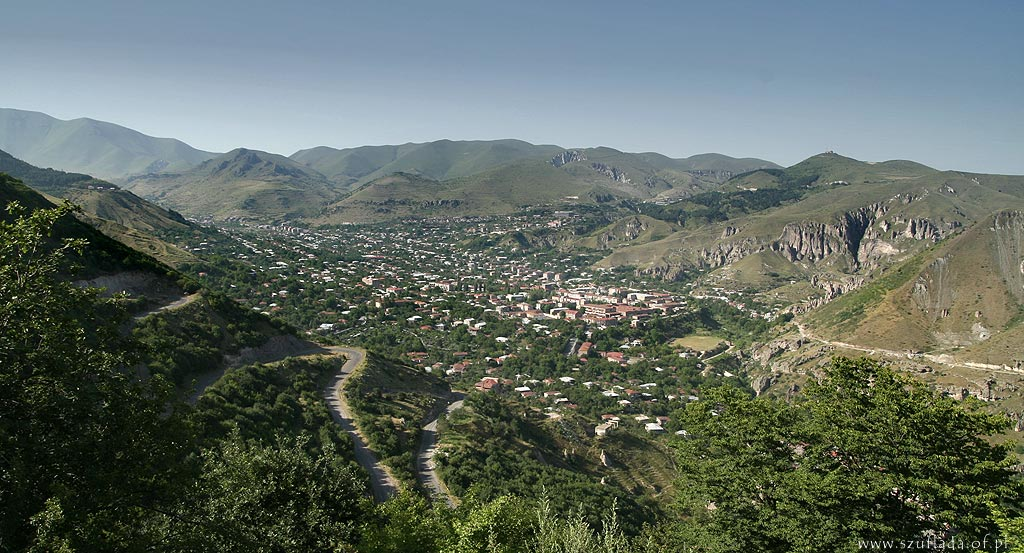
Goris surrounded with the Zangezur Mountains

Goris is situated in the valley of Goris River, also known as Vararak River. The valley is surrounded with the Zangezur Mountains. The town has an average elevation of 1,385 metres above sea level. The surrounding mountains are famous for their medieval cave-dwellings carved out of the soft rock in the southern and eastern parts of the town. The Goris Wildlife Sanctuary is situated at the southeast of the town at a height ranging between 1400 and 2800 meters above sea level, covering an area of 18.5 km^{2}. Caucasian grouse, roe deer and brown bear are among the notable animals in the sanctuary.

Located in a temperate and mild highland climate zone, the climate of Goris is characterized with cold snowy winters and warm summers and classified as oceanic (Köppen Cfb). The average temperature is 0.2 °C in January and +19.7 °C in July. The annual precipitation level is around 700 mm (28 in). Goris has 58.2 days per year with snow cover and 1.2 days with hail.

Climate data for Goris (1991-2020)
Month	Jan	Feb	Mar	Apr	May	Jun	Jul	Aug	Sep	Oct	Nov	Dec	Year
Record high °C (°F)	20.9 (69.6)	19.4 (66.9)	25.5 (77.9)	29.9 (85.8)	29.9 (85.8)	32.7 (90.9)	34.4 (93.9)	35.4 (95.7)	32.5 (90.5)	30 (86)	24.6 (76.3)	21.6 (70.9)	35.4 (95.7)
Daily mean °C (°F)	0.2 (32.4)	0.9 (33.6)	4.4 (39.9)	8.7 (47.7)	13.2 (55.8)	17.2 (63.0)	19.7 (67.5)	19.6 (67.3)	15.5 (59.9)	10.8 (51.4)	5.5 (41.9)	1.9 (35.4)	9.8 (49.7)
Record low °C (°F)	−18.5 (−1.3)	−18.1 (−0.6)	−13.7 (7.3)	−10.4 (13.3)	−2.2 (28.0)	3.8 (38.8)	7.3 (45.1)	6.6 (43.9)	2.6 (36.7)	−3.8 (25.2)	−12.5 (9.5)	−16.1 (3.0)	−18.5 (−1.3)
Average precipitation mm (inches)	29.2 (1.15)	43.4 (1.71)	71 (2.8)	86.2 (3.39)	108.1 (4.26)	84 (3.3)	46.3 (1.82)	34.4 (1.35)	63.8 (2.51)	60.7 (2.39)	48.6 (1.91)	30 (1.2)	705.7 (27.79)
Average precipitation days (≥ 1.0 mm)	5.5	6.6	10.3	11.6	13.6	9.4	5.5	4.4	7.3	7.7	6.8	4.8	93.5
Average relative humidity (%)	65.7	67.9	69.5	72.3	74	70.1	67.2	67.5	73.9	75.5	70.7	65.6	70.0
Mean monthly sunshine hours	110.9	118.7	147.4	158.2	193.6	221.8	229.9	227.2	183.8	145.6	115.9	101	1,954
Source: NCEI

== Demographics ==
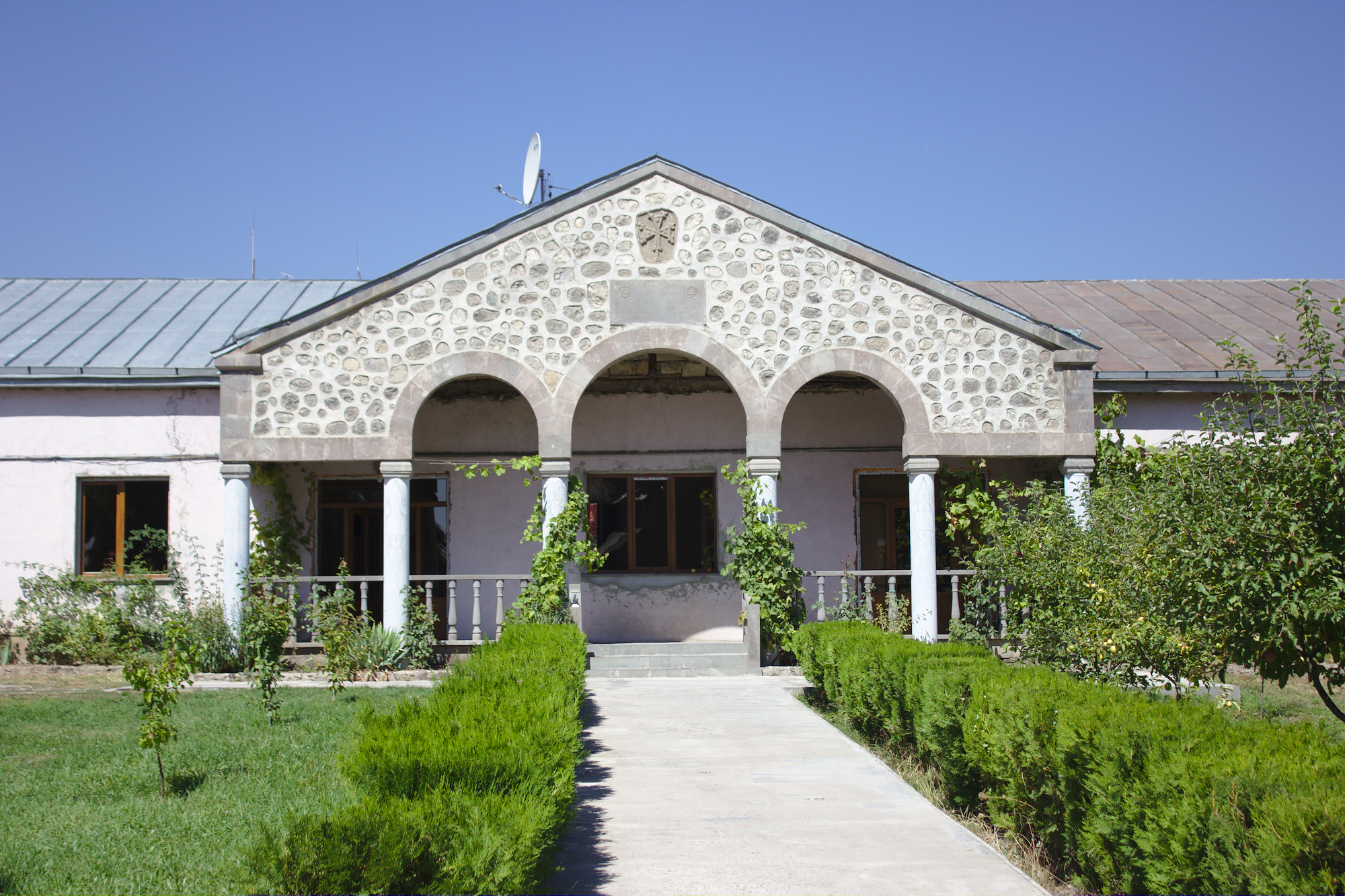
The prelacy building of the Diocese of Syunik, Goris

=== Population ===
Currently, the residents of Goris are entirely Armenians. The population has gradually declined since the collapse of the Soviet Union.

By the end of the 19th century, 74.6% of the population in Goris were ethnic Armenians as per the 1897 census. The figure grew after the Sovietization of Armenia to reach up to 98.1% in the 1926 census.

According to the 1917 publication of the Caucasian Calendar, in 1916 Goris had a population of 2,201, including 1,724 Armenians (78.3%), 202 Shia Muslims (9.2%), and 196 Russians (8.9%).

Historical population
Year	Pop.	±% p.a.
1870	1,000	—
1897	1,450	+1.39%
1916	2,201	+2.22%
1926	2,690	+2.03%
1939	5,571	+5.76%
1959	10,337	+3.14%
1970	14,320	+3.01%
1976	17,400	+3.30%
1989	23,795	+2.44%
2001	20,840	−1.10%
2011	20,591	−0.12%
2022	17,113	−1.67%

=== Religion ===
The Cathedral of Saint Gregory the Illuminator in Goris is the seat of the Diocese of Syunik of the Armenian Apostolic Church. It was constructed between 1897 and 1904. After being consecrated by Catholicos Mkrtich Khrimian in 1903, the church was officially opened in 1904. In February 1921, the Saint Gregory Cathedral of Goris was the location where Garegin Nzhdeh was announced as the Sparapet (commander) of the Armenian forces of the forthcoming Republic of Mountainous Armenia in a solemn ceremony. The church building served as a regional history museum during Soviet times.

== Government ==
Goris is the centre of the Goris Municipality, which includes the villages of Akner, Bardzravan, Hartashen, Karahunj, Khndzoresk, Nerkin Khndzoresk, Shurnukh, Verishen, and Vorotan, as well as the abandoned villages of Aghbulagh, Dzorak and Vanand. The municipality was formed following the administrative reform of 2016. The current mayor of the municipality is Albert Arushanyan.

== Culture ==
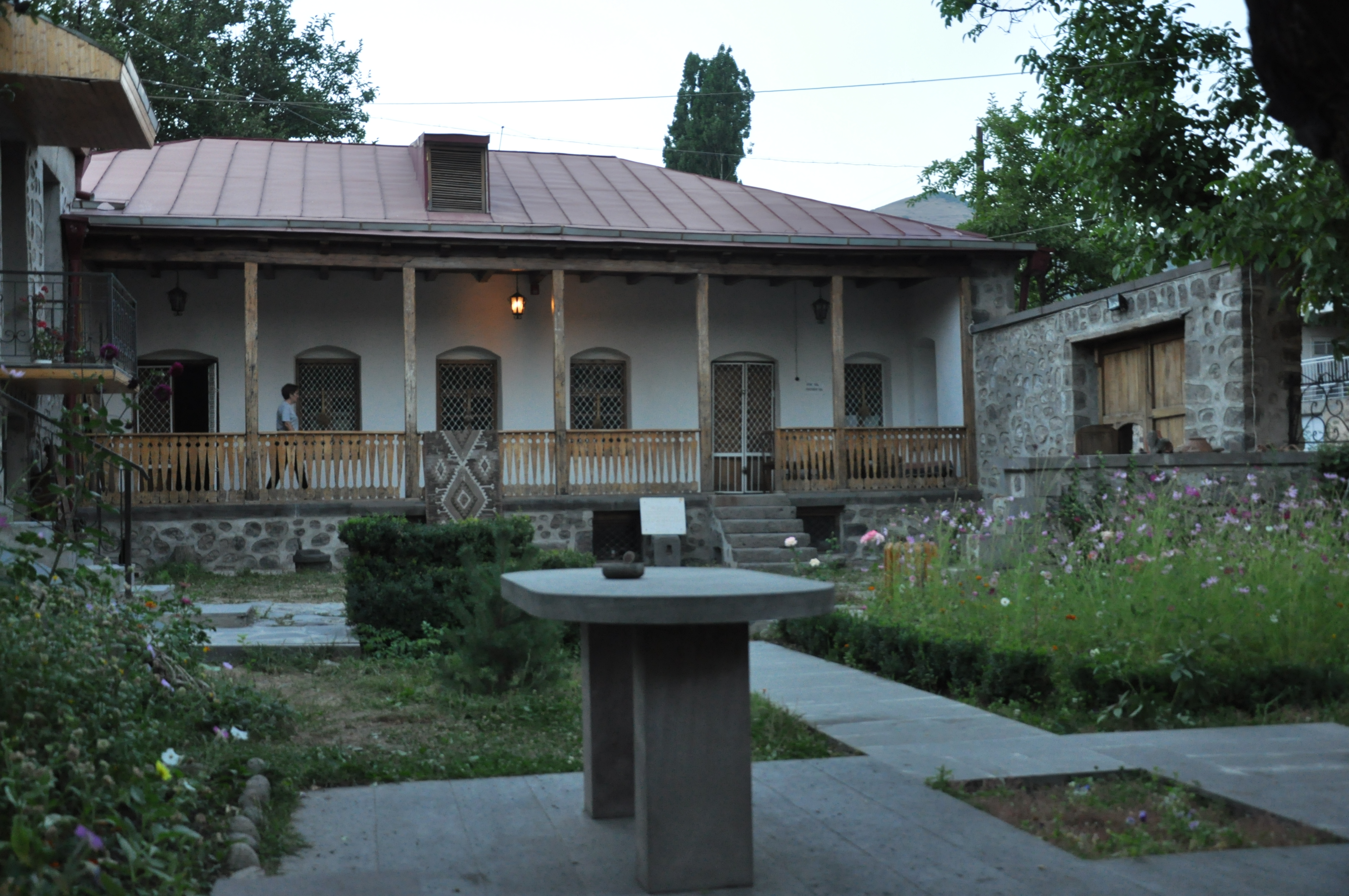
House-museum of Axel Bakunts

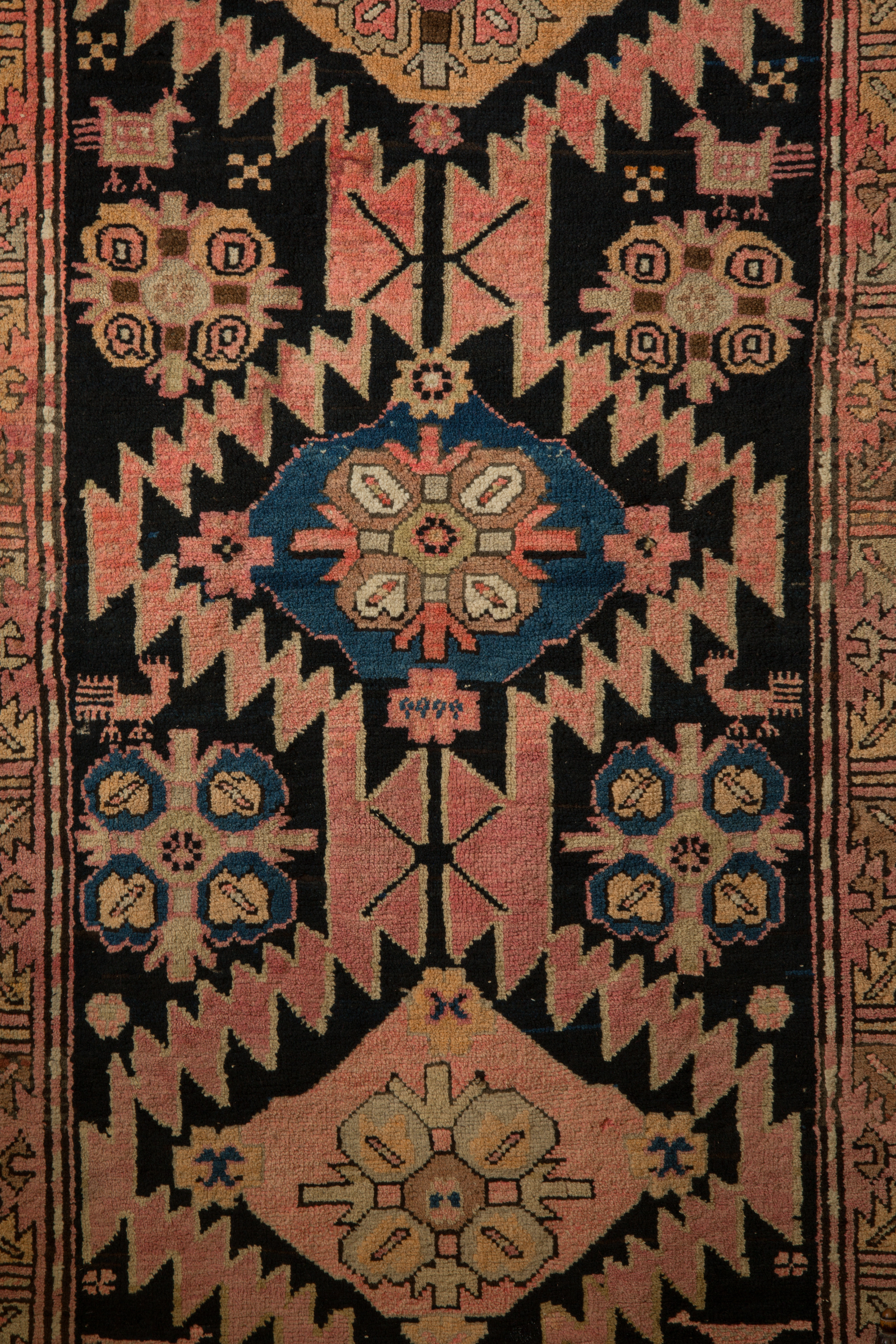
19th century carpet from Goris

The stone pyramids of Old Kores located to the east of the modern town are one of the most attractive sites in Goris. The old town is home to the 4th-century basilica of Saint Hripsime. The basilica was renovated during the 16th century. However, it was closed during the Soviet period. It underwent major renovation in 2010 and was reopened to the public in October 2013.

Goris is a prominent cultural centre in Syunik. It has a cultural palace, a public library and a dramatic theatre.

The archaeological museum of Goris opened in 1948 is dedicated to the rich history of the Syunik region. The house-museum of writer Axel Bakunts has been operating in the town since 1970, while the Goris art gallery has been operating since 2001. Other museums in the town include the geological museum of Goris and the Local Lore Museum of Goris.

Goris has a rich heritage in the music of Armenia and is a major centre for traditional musical instruments. It is the birthplace of the famous musician Gusan Ashot.

The city of Goris is known for its carpets and has long had a rich carpet weaving culture. Goris and its surrounding villages are regarded as the centre of the Zangezur sub-group of the Armenian carpet.

Goris is home to an annual mulberry festival which during the month of August.

== Transportation ==
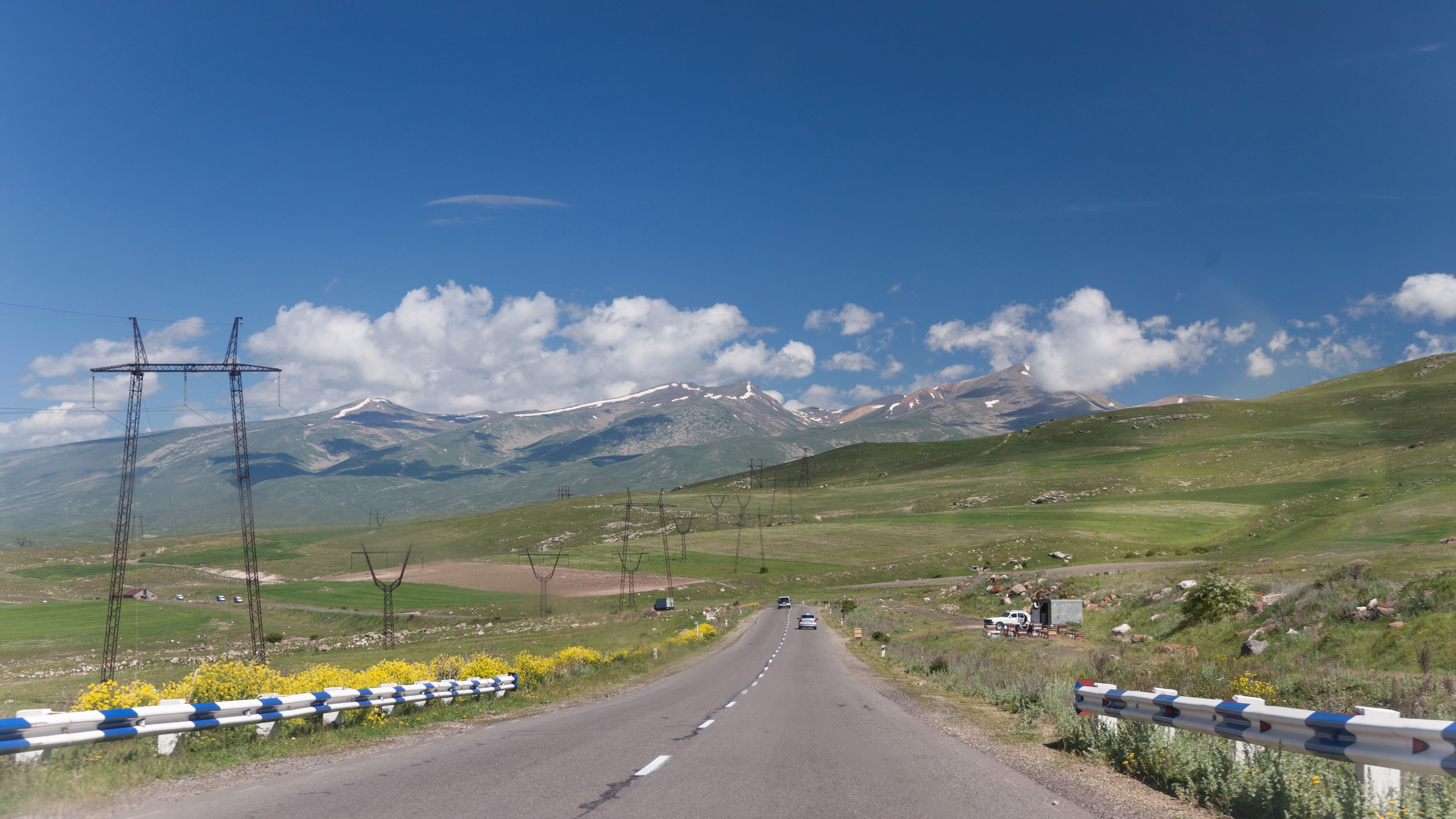
The landscape as seen from the M-2 Motorway between Goris and Shaki

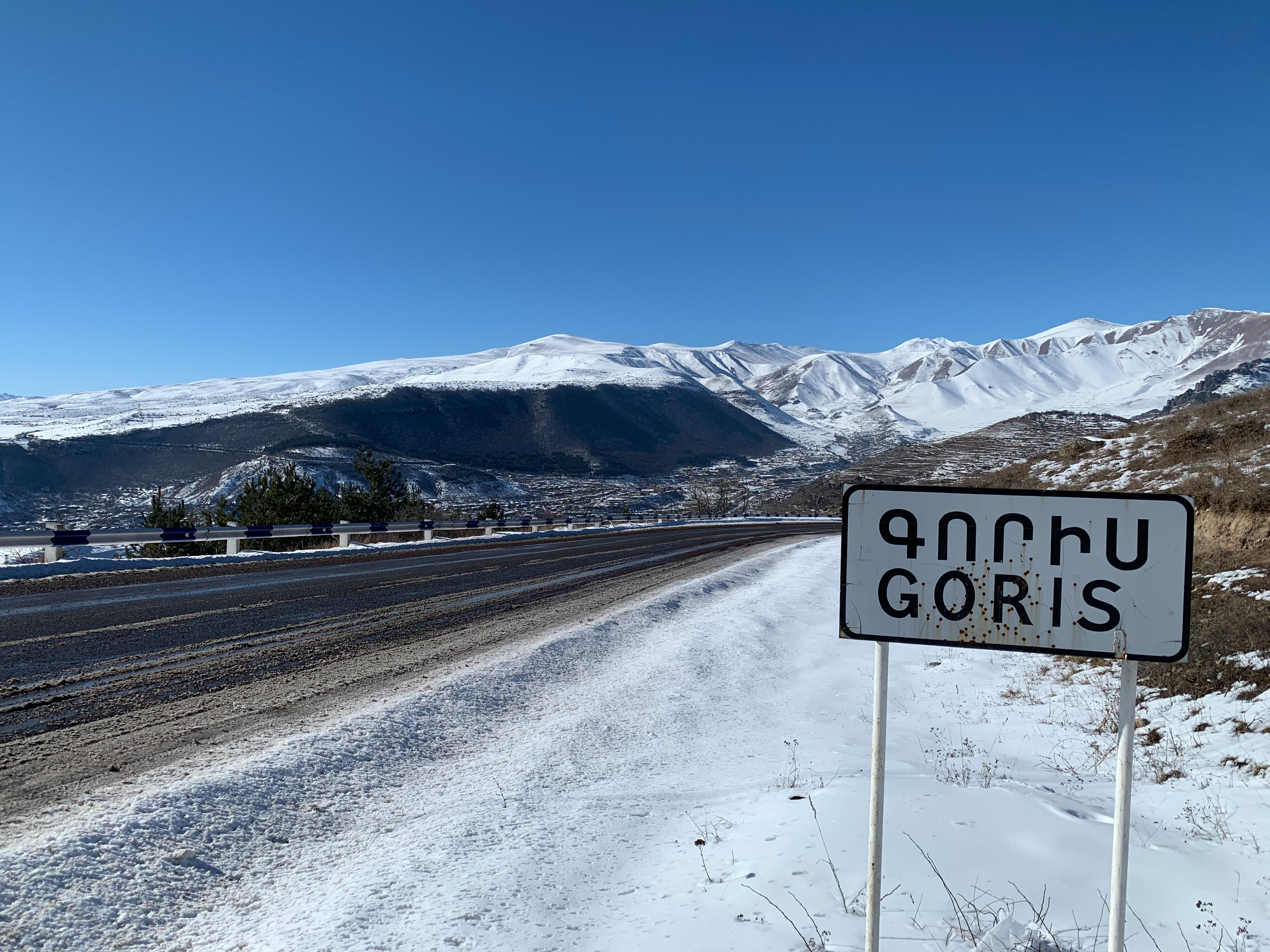
Entrance to the city from highway M-12

The M-2 Highway that connects the capital Yerevan with southern Armenia and Nagorno-Karabakh passes through Goris. Since November 2021, the Goris-Kapan road that connects the town with Kapan and at some points crosses the de facto Armenia-Azerbaijan border has not been in use due to the establishment of Azerbaijani border controls on the road, with an alternative route going through Tatev being used instead.

The Goris Airport, is located 10 kilometers south of Goris, near the village of Khot. It has been closed since 1993. In 2009, the Armenian government declared that it was considering the possibility of reconstructing and reopening the airport. In 2010, it was reported that the reconstruction of the airport would be completed by 2016. However, this did not occur. In September 2023, it was announced that work on the reconstruction of the airport was underway.

== Economy ==
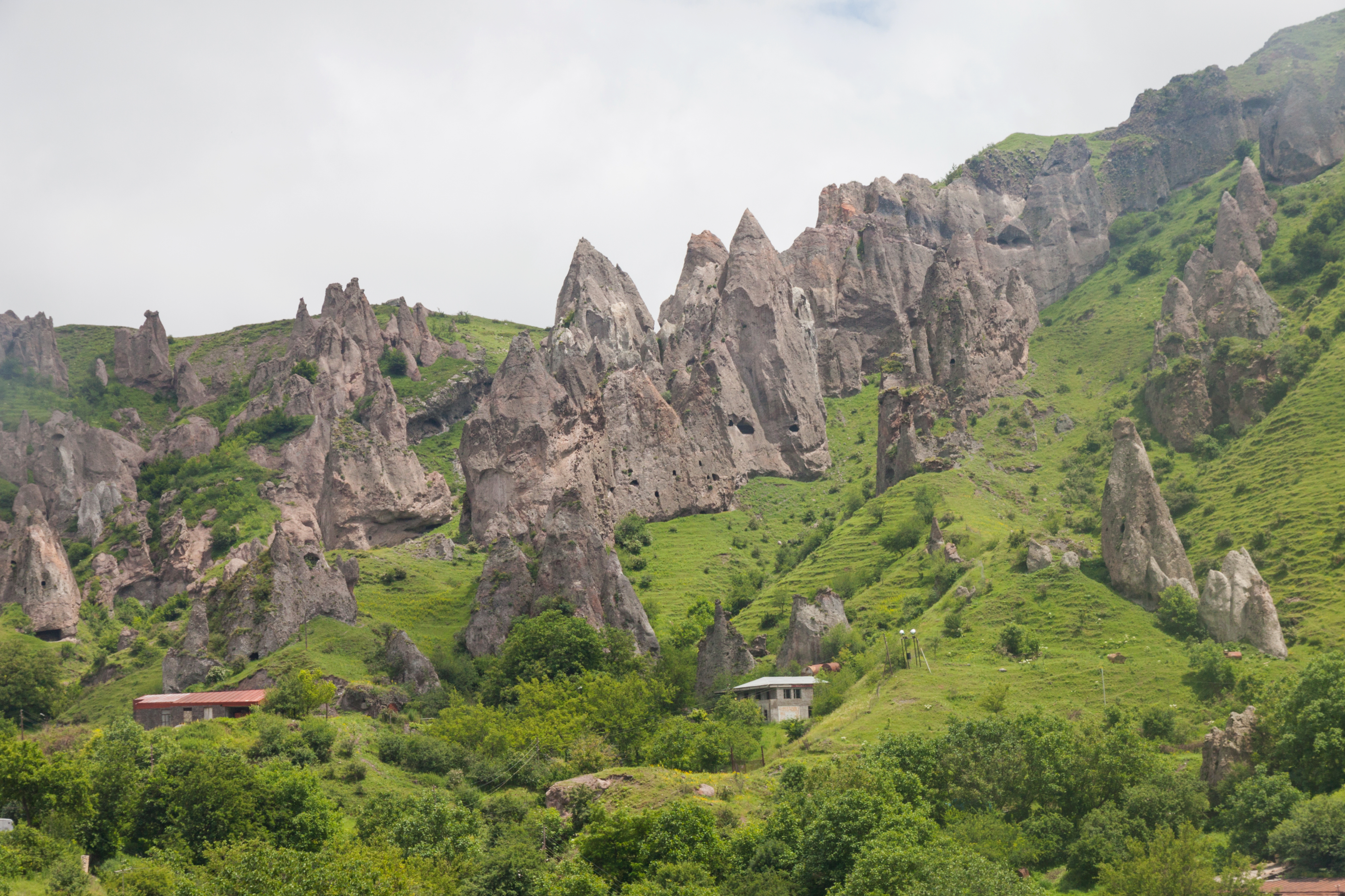
Old Kores

The economy of Goris is mainly based on light industry. It is home to a number of food processing plants. The town's homemade fruit vodkas are particularly famous.

Goris is home to the Vorotan Hydropower Plant (opened in 1989), one of the main providers of electrical power in Armenia. Other large industrial firms in Goris include the road construction company Vosmar LLC (founded in 2002), the electronic device producer Goris Gamma (founded in 2003), and the Goris Group bottled spring water company (founded in 2005).

== Education ==
Goris is an important educational centre in Syunik. It has 7 secondary schools, 2 intermediate colleges, 7 kindergartens, 2 sports schools, 2 music schools and 1 art school.

Goris State University has been operating in the town since 1967. Branches of the State Engineering University of Armenia and Yerevan State Institute of Theatre and Cinematography also operate in the town.

Goris is also home to the Goris Kh. Yeritsyan State Agricultural College.

== Sports ==
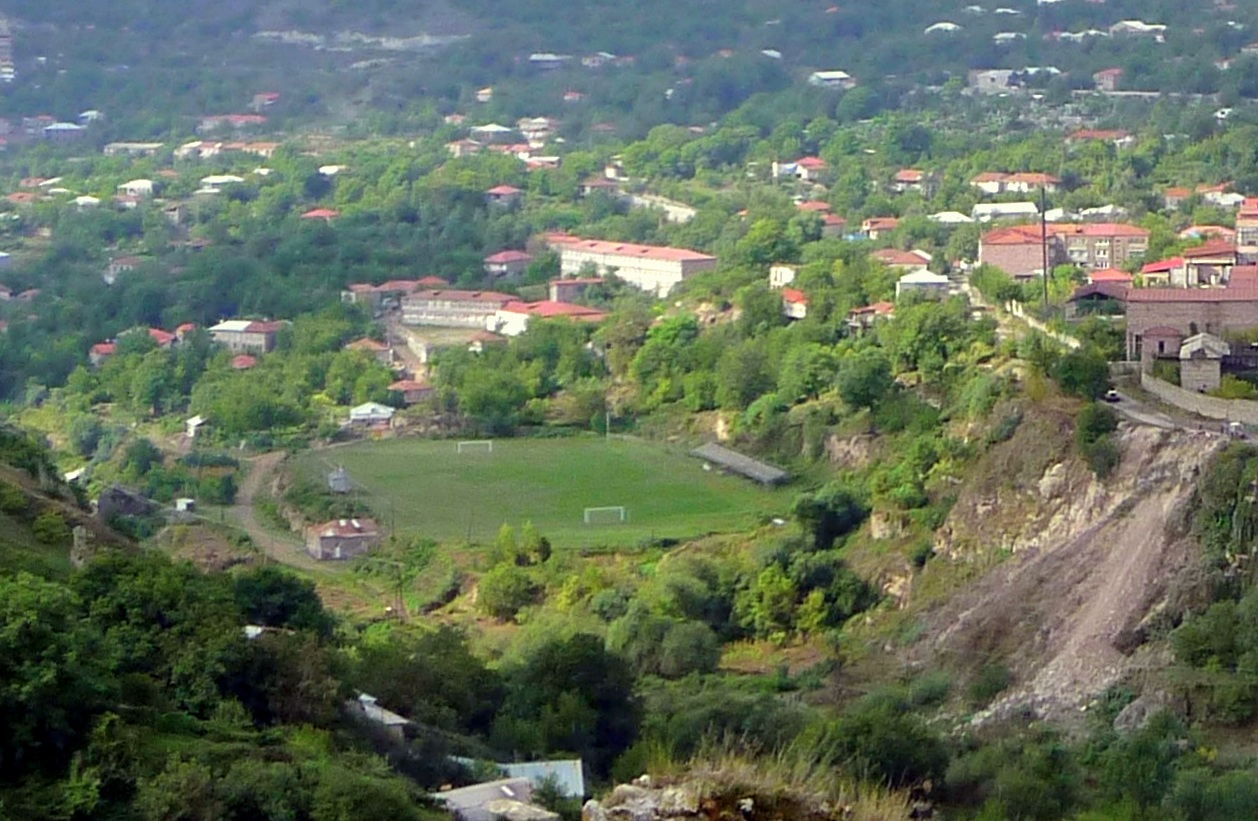
Goris City Stadium

Football, chess, boxing, artistic gymnastics, volleyball and basketball are among the most practiced sports in Goris. The sports sector in the town is served by the Goris Children's and Youth Sports School (opened in 1951), the Goris Regional Children's and Youth Sports School (opened in 2006), and the Albert Ordyan Chess School.

Zangezour Football Club represented the town in professional competitions from 1982 to 1997, when they were forced to quit due to financial difficulties. They played their home games at Goris City Stadium, winning first place in the Armenian First League (2nd division) on 2 occasions.

Goris Rugby club under the leadership of Farzam Sajjadian

== International relations ==
=== Twin towns ===
- Nesvizh, Belarus
- Vienne, Isère, France

== Notable people ==
- Axel Bakunts (1899-1937), Armenian novelist
- Gusan Ashot (1907-1989), Armenian gusan
- Sero Khanzadyan (1915-1998), Armenian novelist
- Yuri Bakhshyan (1947-1999), Armenian politician
- Guros (1905–1981), Armenian painter

== See also ==
- Kingdom of Syunik
- Republic of Mountainous Armenia
