= Local Lore Museum of Goris =

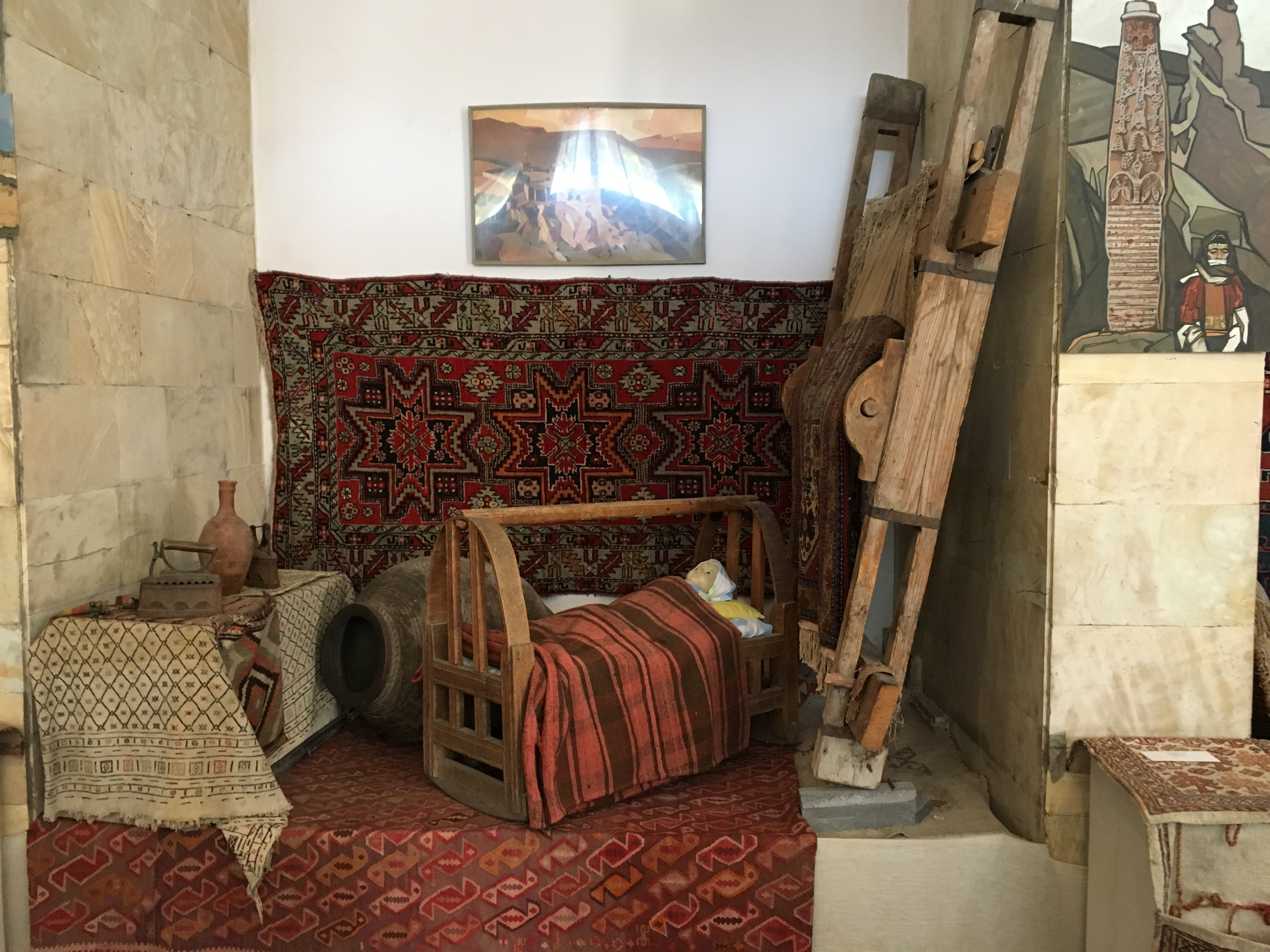
The Local Lore Museum of Goris

The Local Lore Museum of Goris (Armenian: Գորիսի երկրագիտական թանգարան) is the first museum in the Syunik marz of Armenia. The museum opened in 1948 and was originally located in an abandoned church. Located in the center of the city of Goris, it houses a collection of over 5,000 ethnographic and archaeological objects that tell the story of the region's cultural heritage, history, and traditions.

== History ==
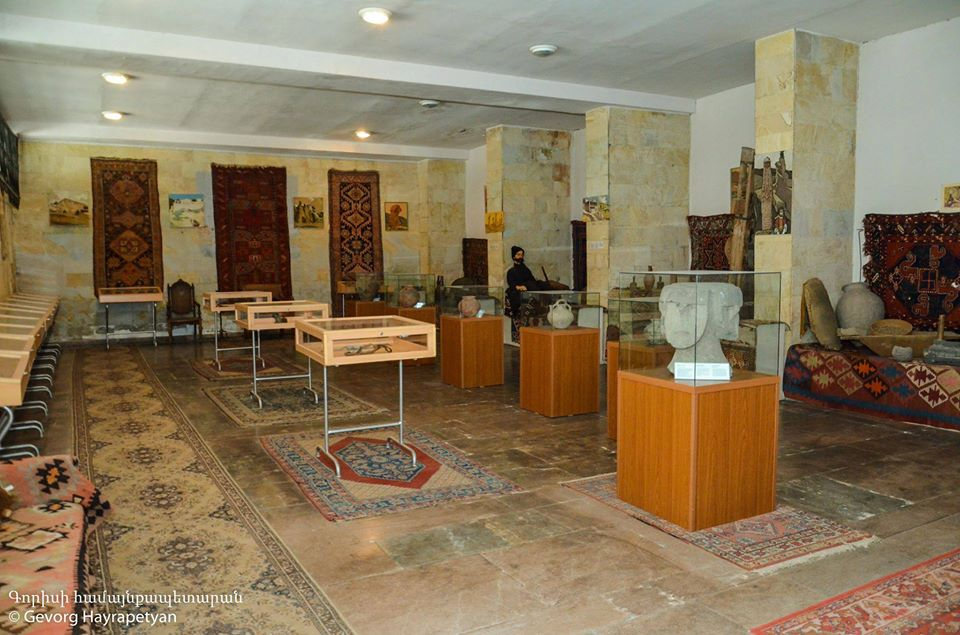
The exhibition hall of the Local Lore Museum of Goris

Originally located in an abandoned church, the Local Lore Museum of Goris opened in 1948 as the first museum in Syunik. The museum was closed in 1988 to safeguard the collection during the Nagorno-Karabakh Conflict, and it remained closed until 2001 when it was relocated and reopened.

The museum is now located in the center of Goris, just off the main Square. Visitors can identify the Museum by the stone sculptures and khachkars sitting outside.

== Collections ==
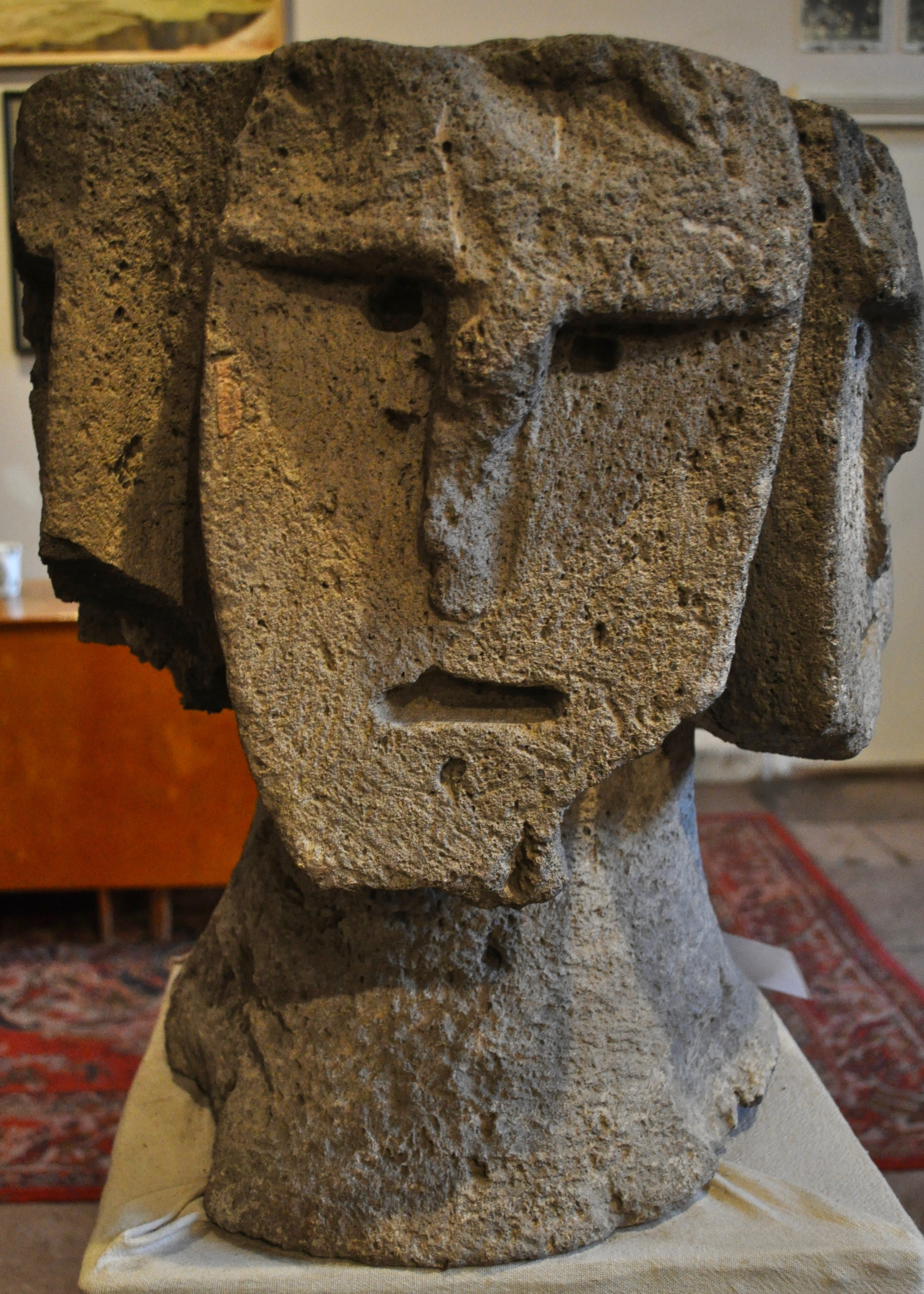
Five-faced idol, 2nd millennium B.C., Harzhis village

The museum shares rich history of Goris, which historically, from ancient times to the modern day, has been a thriving center of the Syunik region. Goris has a long history of stone carving and metal working. The museum has more than 5,000 objects in its collection, of which 400-500 are on display, to illustrate both of these cultural traditions. The collection includes objects from materials from the Soviet-Armenian period, as well as objects from the Early Bronze Age to the present.

The museum collections include weapons, ornaments, belts, ceramics, bronze and beaded jewelry, some with semi-precious stones, and ethnographic objects that speak to a long history of cultural activity. Many objects were excavated near the museum.

Of particular significance is the five-faced idol, which dates back to the 2nd millennium B.C. It is a special pre-Christian object that demonstrates a unique type of imagery. It was found between Tatev and Goris (Harzhis village), and its excavation suggested the location of a pagan temple that existed there previously. Another significant work exhibited at the Museum is the bronze lion from the 7th century B.C. (the Urartian period), symbolic of the Urartian kings.

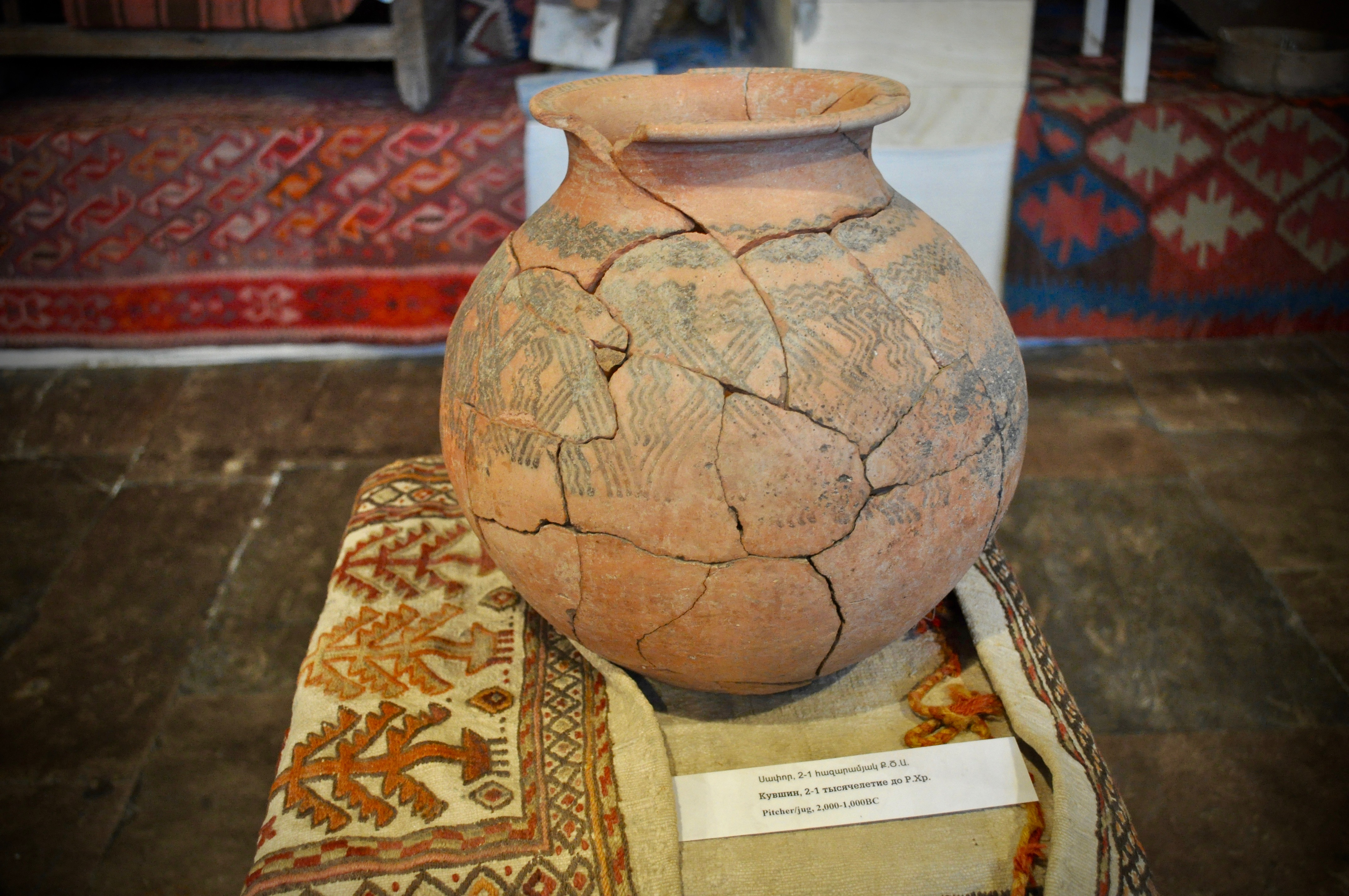
Clay vessel, 2nd-1st millennium BC, Harzhis village

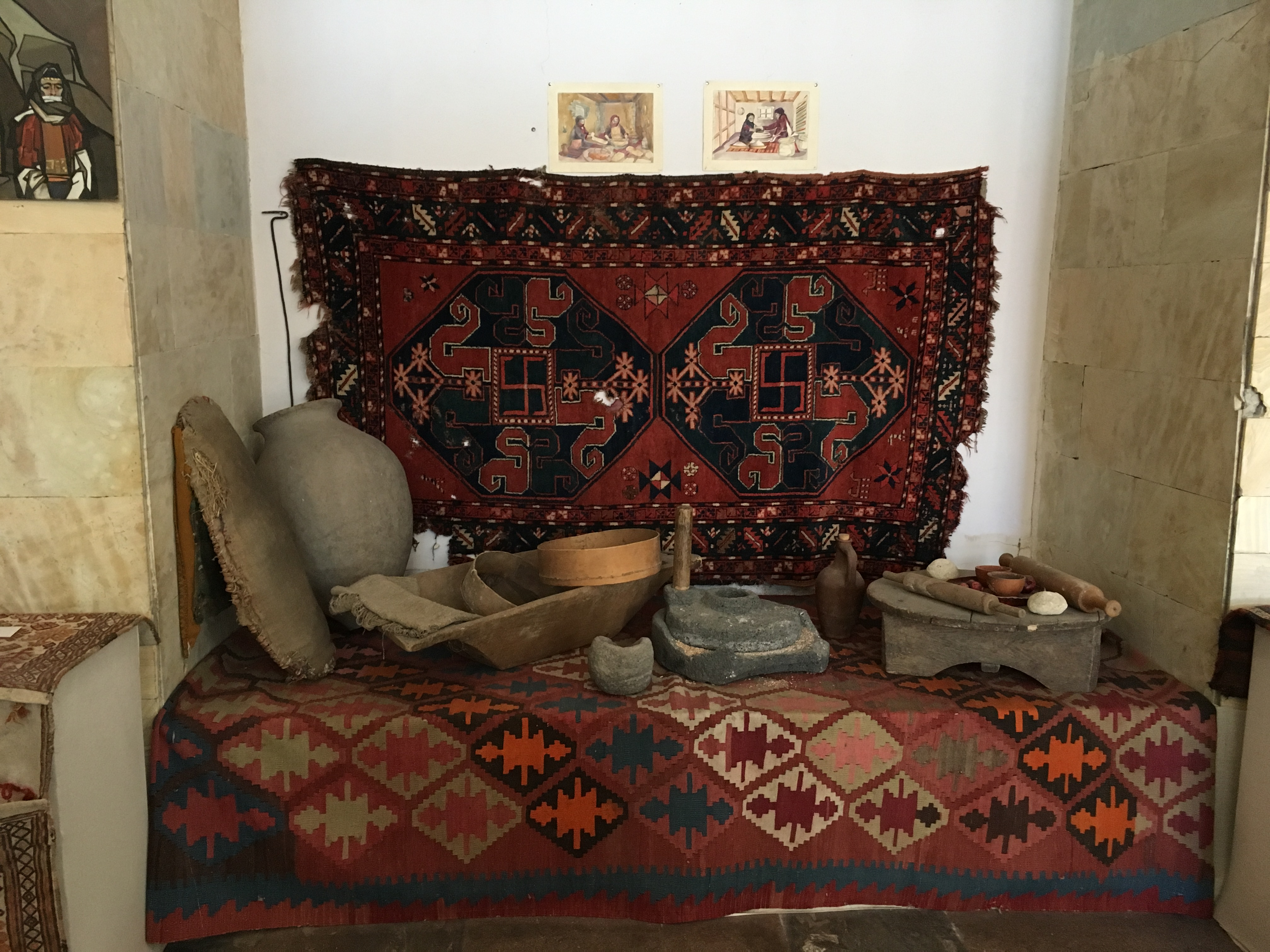
Ethnographic display of objects related to the bread-making tradition at the Local Lore Museum of Goris
