= Goris State University =

University in Syunik, Armenia

- Գորիսի պետական համալսարան
- Type: Public
- Established: 1967; 59 years ago
- Rector: Tigran Vandunts
- Students: 2,000
- Location: Goris, Syunik, Armenia; 39°31′03″N 46°20′44″E
- Campus: Urban
- Website: GorSU (Armenian)
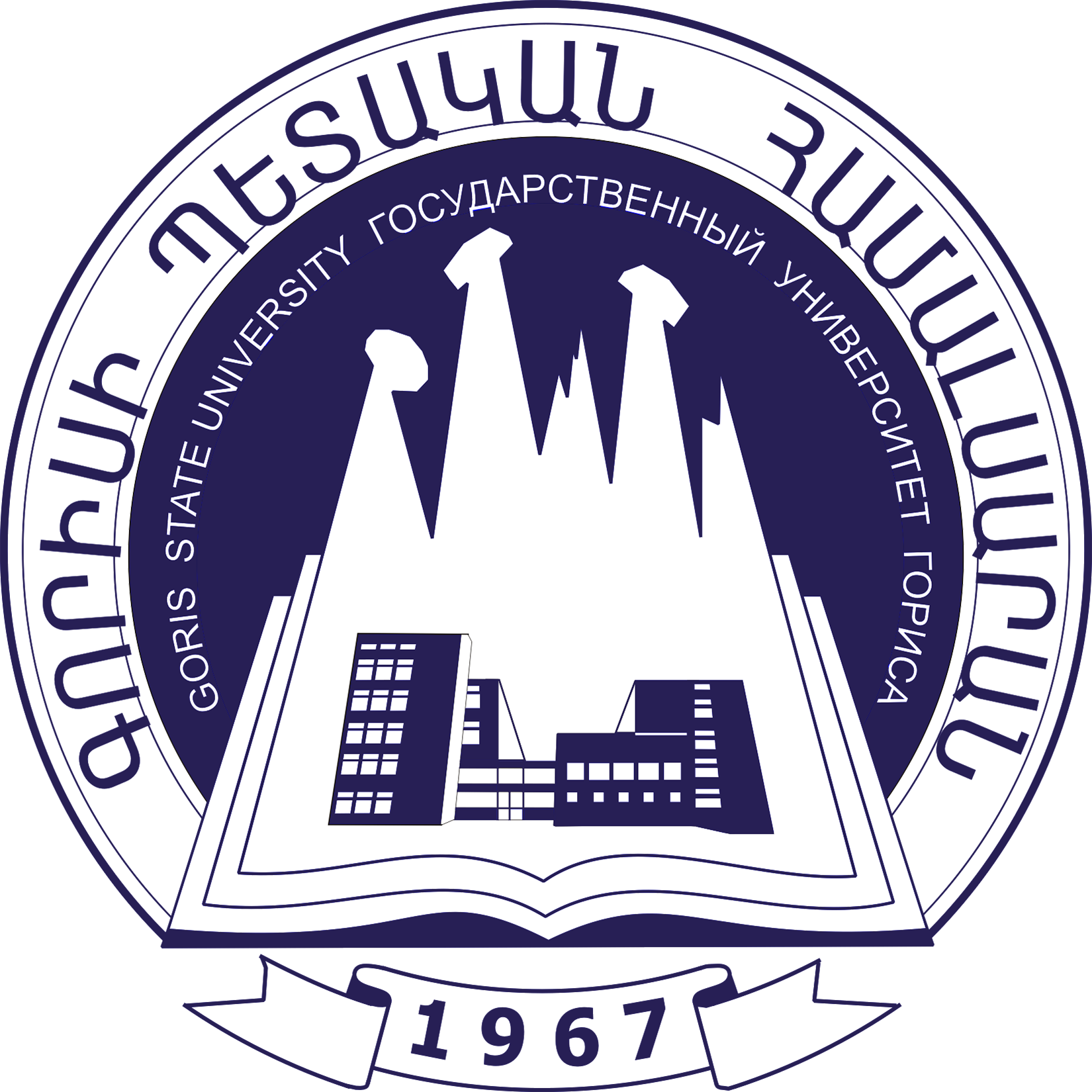

Goris State University (GorSU) (Armenian: Գորիսի պետական համալսարան) is a university in Goris, Syunik Province, Armenia. With 4 faculties, it is the largest university in Syunik Province. It provides degrees in Philology, History and Geography, Pedagogy, Biology and Chemistry, and Physics and Mathematics. Currently, more than 2,000 students are attending the university.

== Overview ==
The origins of the Goris State University trace back to the establishment of the Faculty of Pedagogy in Goris in 1967 as part of the Armenian State Pedagogical University based in Yerevan.

After 4 decades, upon the decision of the government of Armenia, Goris State University was formed in 2006 on the basis of the faculties of the National Polytechnic University of Armenia and the Armenian State Pedagogical University.

The current rector of the university is Tigran Vandunts

== Faculties ==
As of 2017, the university is home to 4 faculties:

- Faculty of Humanities
  - Section of Armenian Language and Literature
  - Section of Pedagogy
  - Section of History
  - Section of Law
- Faculty of Natural Sciences
  - Section of Mathematics
  - Section of Chemistry
  - Section of Biology
- Faculty of Engineering
  - Section of Industrial Electronics and Energy
  - Section of Physics and Engineering
- Faculty of Economics
  - Section of Economics and Public Sciences
  - Section of Foreign Languages
