= Diocese of Syunik =

Diocese of Syunik Սյունյաց թեմ
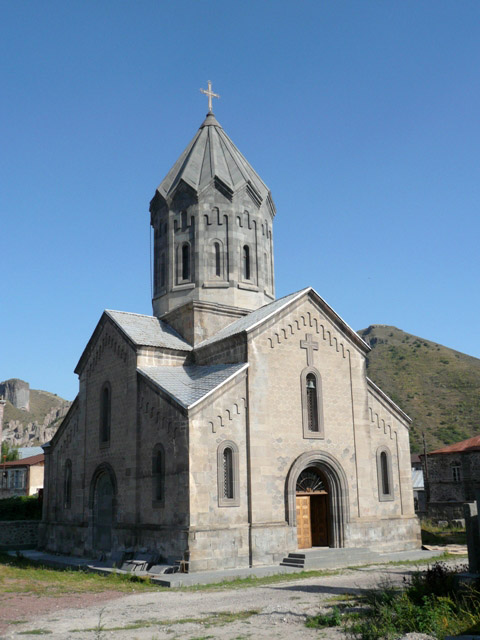
- Saint Gregory Cathedral

Location
- Country: Armenia

Statistics
- Population: Total: (as of 2010); 141,771

Information
- Denomination: Armenian Apostolic Church
- Rite: Armenian Rite
- Established: 1996
- Cathedral: Saint Gregory Cathedral, Goris

Current leadership
- Patriarch: Karekin II
- Primate: Rev. Fr. Zaven Yazichyan

Diocese of Syunik (Armenian: Սյունյաց թեմ Syunyats t'em) is one of the largest dioceses of the Armenian Apostolic Church covering the Syunik Province of Armenia. It is named after the historic province of Syunik; the 9th province of the Kingdom of Armenia. The diocesan headquarters are located in the town of Goris. The seat of the bishop is the Saint Gregory Cathedral.

The diocese was established on 30 May 1996. From its creation until December 2010, bishop Abraham Mkrtchyan has served as its primate. Rev. Fr. Zaven Yazichyan succeeded him as primate of the diocese.

== Gallery ==
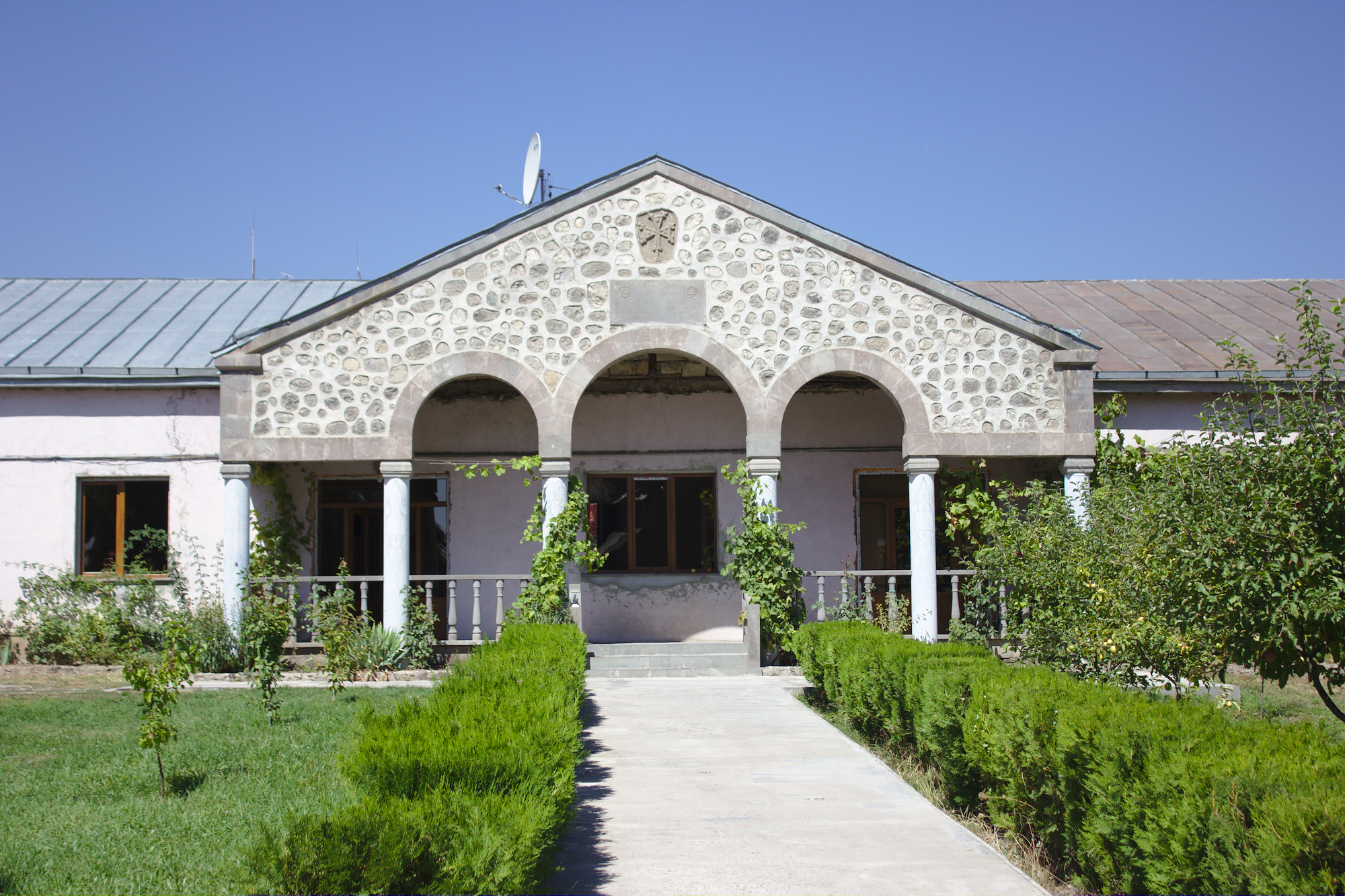
The prelacy building
