= Henry Valen =

Norwegian political scientist (1924–2007)

- Born: 20 May 1924; Hadsel, Norway
- Died: 27 January 2007 (aged 82)
- Awards: Knight, First Class of the Order of St. Olav
- Scientific career
- Fields: Political science
- Workplaces: University of Oslo

Henry Halfdan Valen (20 May 1924 – 27 January 2007) was a Norwegian political scientist.

He was born in Hadsel. He was appointed Professor at the University of Oslo from 1970. His main research interest has been electorate behavior. He chaired the Norwegian Social Science Data Services from 1974 to 1980. He was decorated Knight, First Class of the Order of St. Olav in 1998.

His daughter Guro Valen was a professor of medicine. He was inducted into the Norwegian Academy of Science and Letters in 1993.
