= Guro Valen =

Norwegian professor of medicine

Guro Valen (20 March 1960 – 26 September 2014) was a Norwegian professor of medicine.

She was a daughter of political scientist Henry Valen. She worked at the University of Tromsø, Karolinska Institutet and the University of Oslo, and was a fellow of the Norwegian Academy of Science and Letters. She died from cancer in September 2014.
