= Guros =

Armenian painter

Guros (Gourgen Paronyan)
- Born: Gourgen Gevorg Paronyan; 1905; Goris, Russian Empire
- Died: 1981 (aged 75–76)
- Known for: Painter

Gourgen "Guros" Paronyan (Armenian: Գուրգեն Գևորգի "Գուրոս" Պարոնյան-Հովսեփյան; 1905–1981) was an Armenian painter, Honoured Artist of the Armenian SSR, and Member of the Armenian Artists' Union.

== Biography ==
Guros was born in 1905 in the town of Goris to the famous family of Melik Ohanyans. Melik Ohan was his grandfather and Gevorg Paronyan was his father – a very intelligent person called «a walking encyclopedia» the Paronyan's family used to have a photo studio, a pharmacy, a bookbinder's shop, etc.

Guros was one year old when his father died and at the age of two he lost his mother, thus remaining with his aunt (father's sister). His aunt was a famous carpet weaver.

Guros entered the world of art as a photographer. For ten years he was constantly in the world of photography. He would tour the farthest places to reach and the coziest nooks, he would climb up rocks, go down the deepest canyons to take photos of the most interesting most precious sights. He was fond of taking photos of nature.

In 1928 an art studio opened in Goris and functioned until 1932. In 1931 he took up painting.

In 1933 Guros moved to Yerevan and started to work at a Scientific-research institute as a photographer. In 1936 he took part in republican exhibitions.

In 1938 Guros gave up photography and dedicated himself to painting.

Since 1939 Guros was a Member of Armenian Artists' Union.

In 1945 and 1958 personal exhibitions of Guros were organized in Yerevan and in 1963 in Goris, Sisian, Kapan, Kajaran.

In 1965 Guros was awarded the title of an Honoured Artist of the Armenian SSR.

He died in 1981. After his death several his exhibitions have been organized both in and outside Armenia.
