= Bardzravan =

Bardzravan Բարձրավան
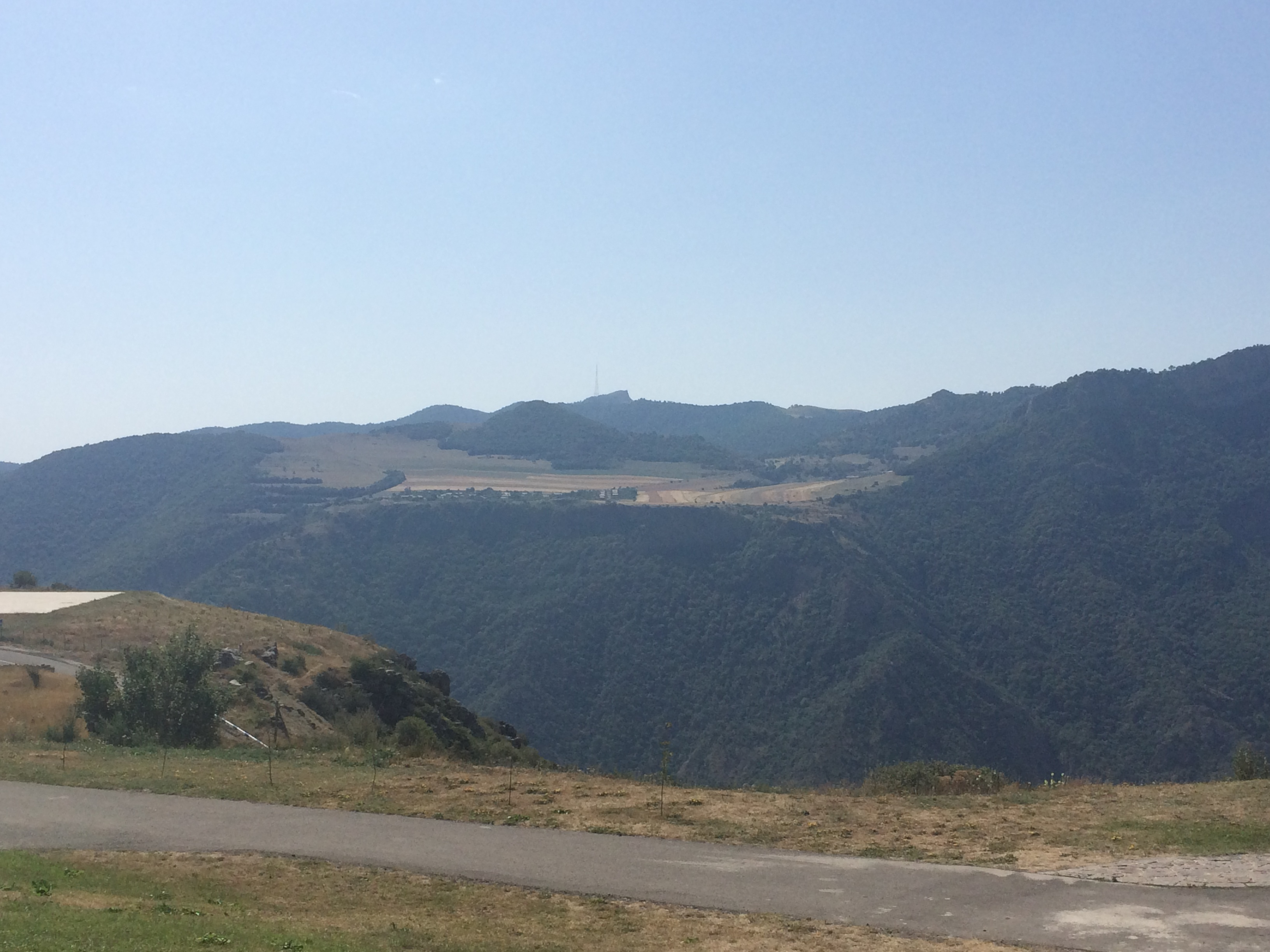

- Location within Armenia Location within Syunik Province
- Coordinates: 39°23′52″N 46°19′47″E
- Country: Armenia
- Province: Syunik

Area
  - Total: 10.15 km^{2} (3.92 sq mi)

Population (2011)
  - Total: 146
  - Density: 14.4/km^{2} (37.3/sq mi)
- Time zone: UTC+4 (AMT)

Bardzravan (Armenian: Բարձրավան) is a village in the Goris Municipality of the Syunik Province in Armenia.

== Toponymy ==
The village was previously known as Yeritsatumb (Armenian: Երիցաթումբ).

== Demographics ==
The Statistical Committee of Armenia reported its population as 175 in 2010, up from 168 at the 2001 census.
