= Nerkin Khndzoresk =

Nerkin Khndzoresk Ներքին Խնձորեսկ
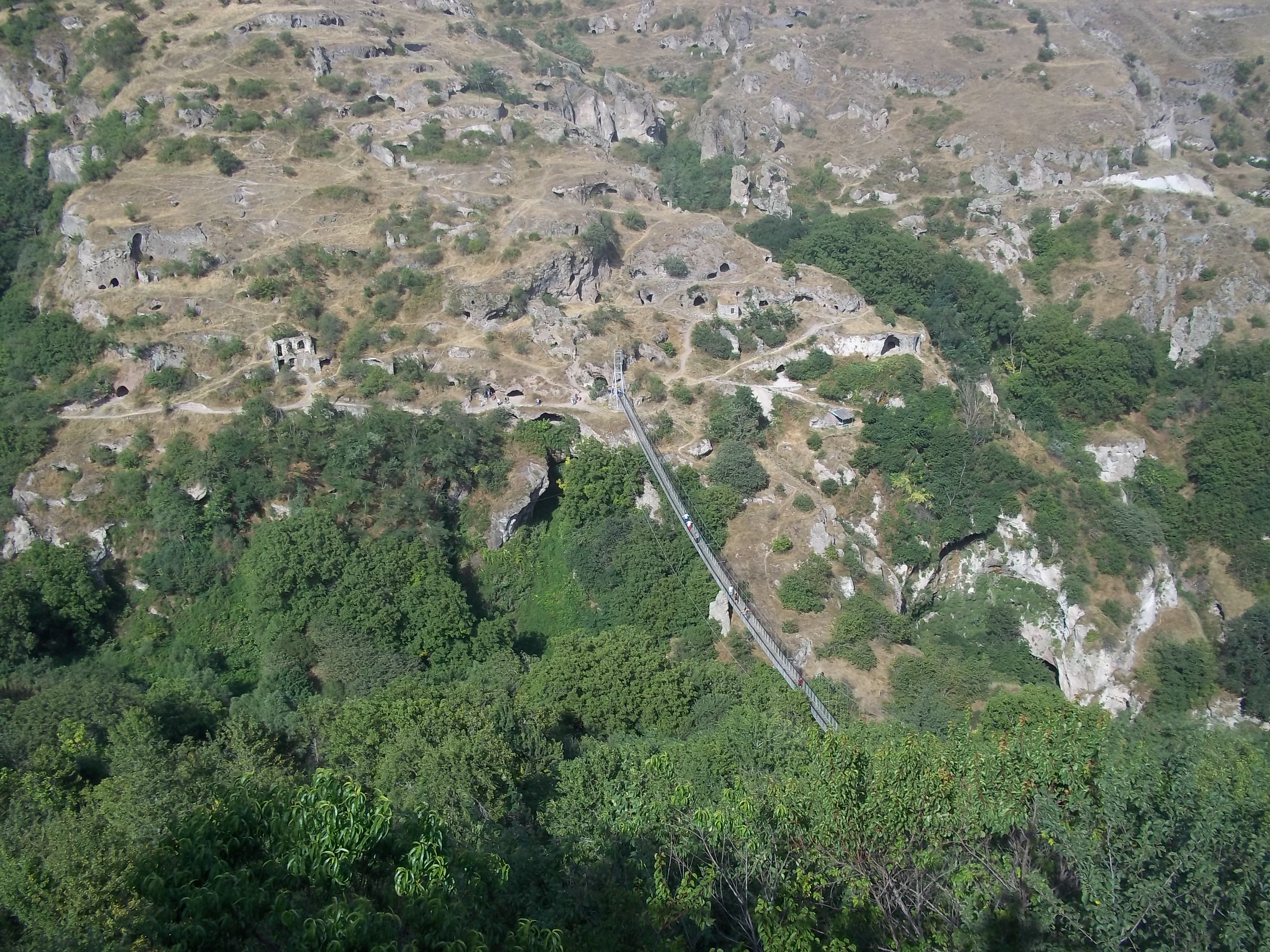

- Location within Armenia Location within Syunik Province
- Coordinates: 39°30′22″N 46°29′46″E
- Country: Armenia
- Province: Syunik
- Municipality: Goris

Area
  - Total: 6.18 km^{2} (2.39 sq mi)

Population (2011)
  - Total: 276
  - Density: 44.7/km^{2} (116/sq mi)
- Time zone: UTC+4 (AMT)

Nerkin Khndzoresk (Armenian: Ներքին Խնձորեսկ) is a village in the Goris Municipality of the Syunik Province in southeastern Armenia. Nerkin Khndzoresk is located close to the border, and is located 21 km from Goris of the Stepanakert highway. The village lies 7 km from the Khndzoresk village connected by farm fields and one dirt road. The remote village is positioned below the larger village and is surrounded by rolling hills, gorges, and scenic mountains.

== History ==
The village was founded in 1983 as a result of resizing of the bigger village of Khndzoresk. After the foundation of the village of Khndzoresk, the lower Nerkin Khndzoresk was established to strengthen the southeastern borders of Armenia, and was strategically placed below the larger village to prevent enemies from attacking. However, any expansion and maintenance of the area ceased after the fall of the Soviet Union.

== Demographics ==
=== Population ===
The National Statistical Service of the Republic of Armenia (ARMSTAT) reported its population was 321 in 2010, up from 184 at the 2001 census. The majority of the population is of Armenian descent, including ethnic Armenian refugees who settled in the area after fleeing Azerbaijan during the First Nagorno-Karabakh War. The citizens mainly identify as Armenian Apostolic Christians and speak Armenian and often Russian.

== Economy ==
The area is impoverished with little employment outside of self-sufficient farming and gardening. Substance farming and animal breeding are the main sources of livelihood.

== Education ==
The village has one school and one kindergarten. Nerqin Khndzoresk Secondary School has approximately 50 students, small but quite beautiful. The school is surrounded by swaying, tall grass fields, sunflowers, and fruit bearing trees. The school was founded on March 10, 1989. The classes began in small cottages and continued to be held in modest areas until the renovation of the school in 2004. The school contains all grades (forms) 1-12. The class sizes range from 1 student to 9 students. The following subjects are taught: Armenian, Armenian Literature, Russian, Russian Literature, English, History, Armenian History, Armenian Church History, Math, Algebra, Geometry, Strategy, Biology, Physical Education, Art, Music, Healthy Lifestyles, Law, and Geography. School begins September 1 and goes through May 25th. The school’s vacation schedule is consistent with that of the rest of Armenia:

- Autumn Break: Usually last week of October
- Winter Break: Usually end of December to mid-January
- Spring Break: Usually last week of March
- Summer Break: Usually end of May to end of August

The daily school schedule begins at 9 am and ends at 3 pm with five-minute breaks between each class and one 15-minute break after the third lesson. There are generally up to six classes within a day. Classes are attended Monday through Saturday.

== Climate ==
The village has four distinct seasons. The summertime is generally quite hot, dry, and relatively humid. The fall often brings thick fog and rain. The winters are mild. The spring is relatively warm and rainy. The weather allows for a plethora of fruits and vegetables to be grown throughout the community. Most citizens have large gardens containing the following, but not limited to: potatoes, cucumber, tomato, squash, green beans, garlic, onion, peppers, cabbage, greens, sunflowers, apples, grapes, pineapples, cherries, plums, figs, apricots, pears, peach, watermelon, melon.
