= Khndzoresk =

Khndzoresk Խնձորեսկ
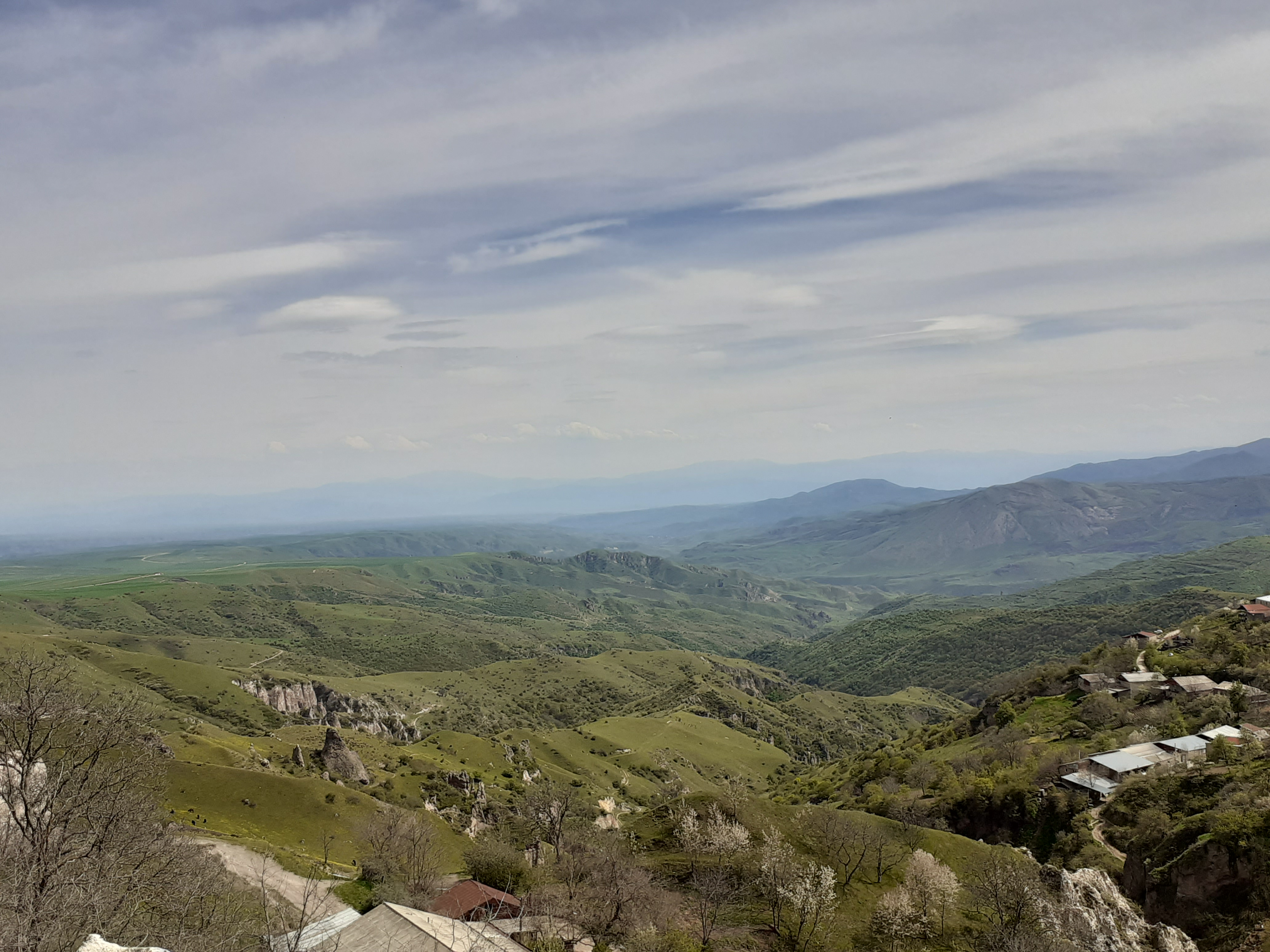

- Location within Armenia Location within Syunik Province
- Coordinates: 39°30′44″N 46°26′01″E
- Country: Armenia
- Province: Syunik
- Municipality: Goris

Area
  - Total: 67.86 km^{2} (26.20 sq mi)

Population (2011)
  - Total: 2,070
  - Density: 30.5/km^{2} (79.0/sq mi)
- Time zone: UTC+4 (AMT)

Khndzoresk (Armenian: Խնձորեսկ, pronounced [χəndzɔˈɾɛsk]) is a village in the Goris Municipality of the Syunik Province in Armenia. The village is located to the east of the Goris-Stepanakert highway, on the steep slopes of Khor Dzor (Deep Gorge), which the village is named after, according to tradition.

Crossing the bridge at the entrance of the village, the road continues towards the towns of Lachin and Stepanakert. New Khndzoresk (the current inhabited area) was built in the 1950s. The village is located at 1,580 m (5,180 ft) above sea level and occupies 6,772.8 ha (26.150 sq mi).

== History ==
In the end of the 19th century, Old Khndzoresk was the biggest village of Eastern Armenia. In the beginning of the 20th century the community had 8,300 inhabitants (1,800 households). In 1913 there were 27 shops, 3 dye-houses, tanneries, 7 schools. The village is famous for taking part in the liberation movement of David Bek. The fortress of Khndzoresk served as a military base for Mkhitar Sparapet in 1728–1730. In 1735 the village was visited by Catholicos (Head of Armenian Apostolic Church) Abraham Kretatsi who gave a thorough description of the community in his chronicles. During the 1980s, an additional village sprouted 7 km (4.3 mi) from Khndzoresk due to resizing and political unrest. This village, considerably smaller than Khndzoresk, is called Lower Khndzoresk, or Nerkin Khndzoresk.

== Cultural heritage ==
Khndzoresk is widely famous for its canyon with picturesque rock formations and ancient cave settlement. The artificial caves, some of which are currently used as stables and warehouses, used to be inhabited till the 1950s. In the bottom of the gorge there is St. Hripsime church, dating back to the 17th century. On a spur beyond on the right side of the gorge there is Anapat (hermitage) with the tomb of Mkhitar Sparapet. The cave church of St. Tatevos can also be found nearby.

== Economy and culture ==
About 90% of the population is engaged in agriculture and animal husbandry. There is a small milk processing enterprise, employing 8 people. The community has a number of administrative and public institutions, such as a community council, a secondary school (with 370 pupils), a musical school, a kindergarten, a library, a museum and a culture club.

== Demographics ==
In the 1823 survey of the province of Karabakh completed by Russian general Aleksey Petrovich Yermolov, Khndzoresk, mentioned as was Khinzyrak, was recorded as an Armenian village consisting of 170 tax-paying households, headed by the Armenian Melik Husein Ali. According to the 1897 census, Khndzoresk—mentioned as Khinzirak (Russian: Хинзиракъ)—had a population of 4,516, all Armenian Apostolics. The village had 2,295 men and 2,221 women.

The National Statistical Service of the Republic of Armenia (ARMSTAT) reported its population as 2,260 in 2010, up from 1,992 at the 2001 census. In 2009, the population of Khndzoresk comprised 2256 people, of which 1126 were women and 1130 were men. There were 516 households in total.

The population of Khndzoresk since 1831 is as follows:

Year	Population	Note
1831	1,342	1,322 Armenians, 20 Muslims
1873	3,369	100% Armenian
1886	4,219	100% Armenian
1897	4,516	100% Armenian Apostolic; 2,295 men.
1904	7,059	
1914	8,335	Mainly Armenian
1916	3,710	
1919	4,550	Mainly Armenian
1922	3,505	100% Armenian
1926	2,596	2,591 Armenians, 5 Persians; 1,233 men
1931	1,980	100% Armenian
1939	2,980	
1959	1,992	
1979	1,820	
1989	1,828	
2001	1,992	
2011	2,070	

== Climate ==
The climate in the community is warm, relatively humid, with mild winters. Annual precipitation is 450-700mm.

== Notable people ==
- Tatevik Sazandaryan, opera singer

== Gallery ==
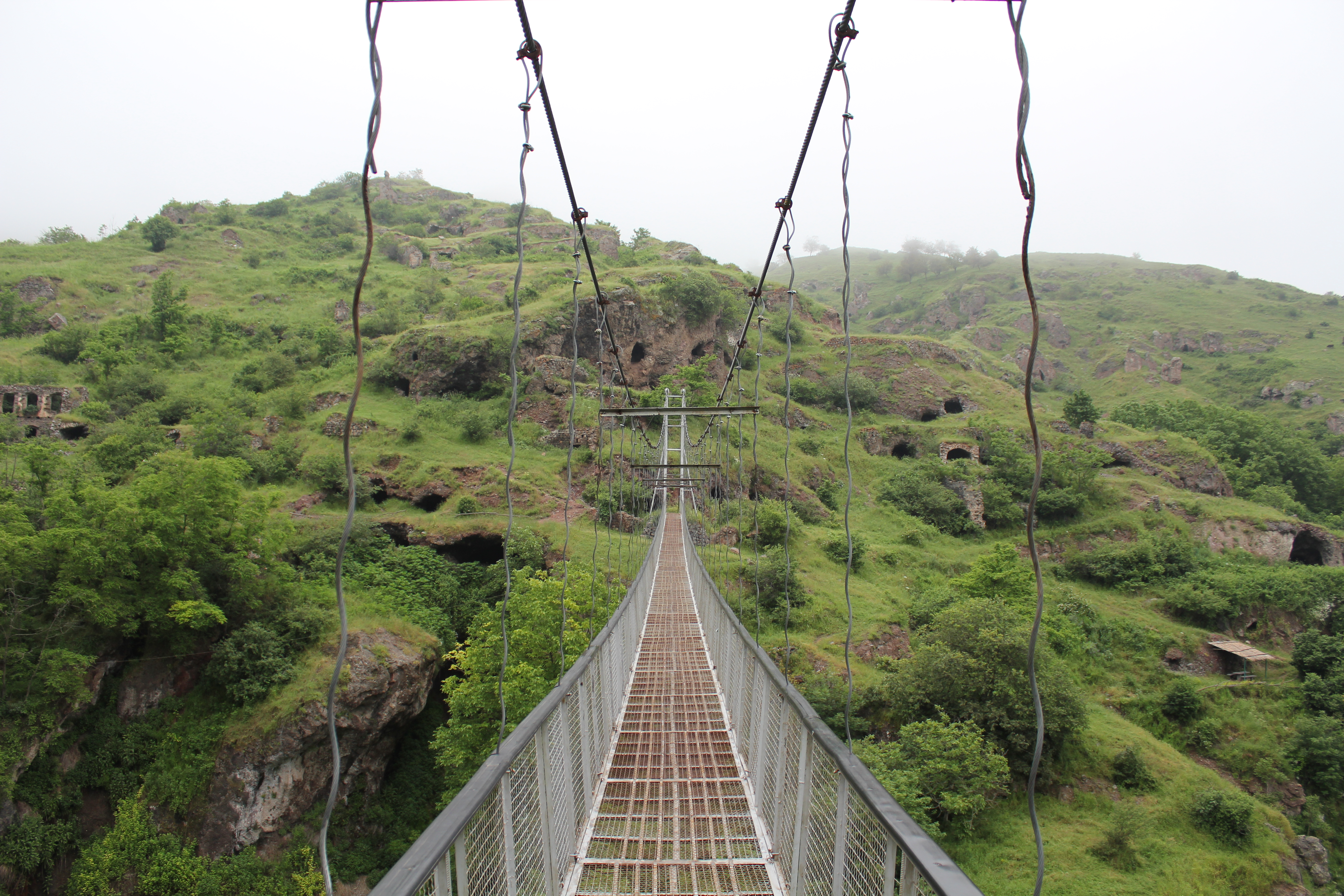

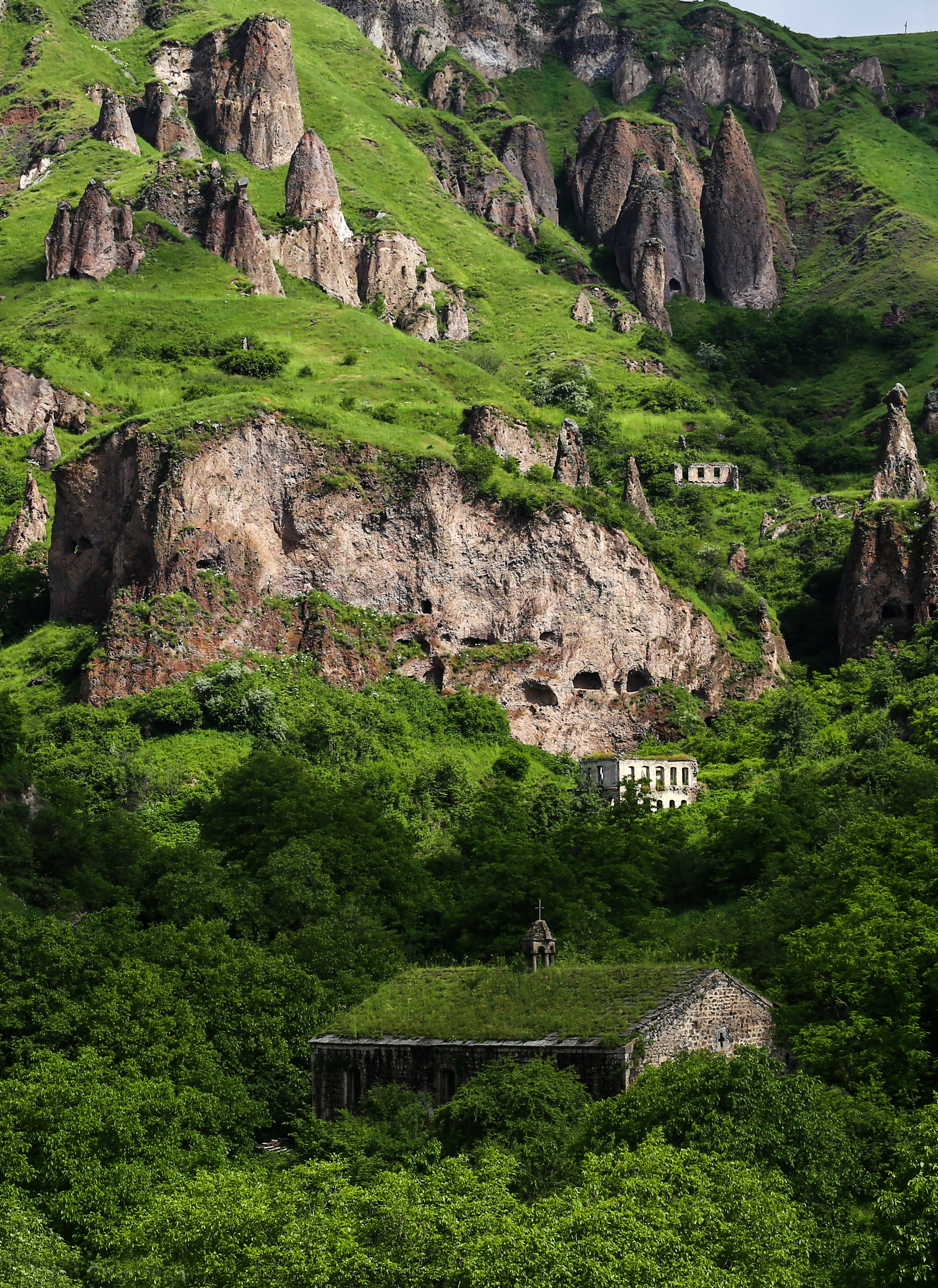
The caves of Khndzoresk

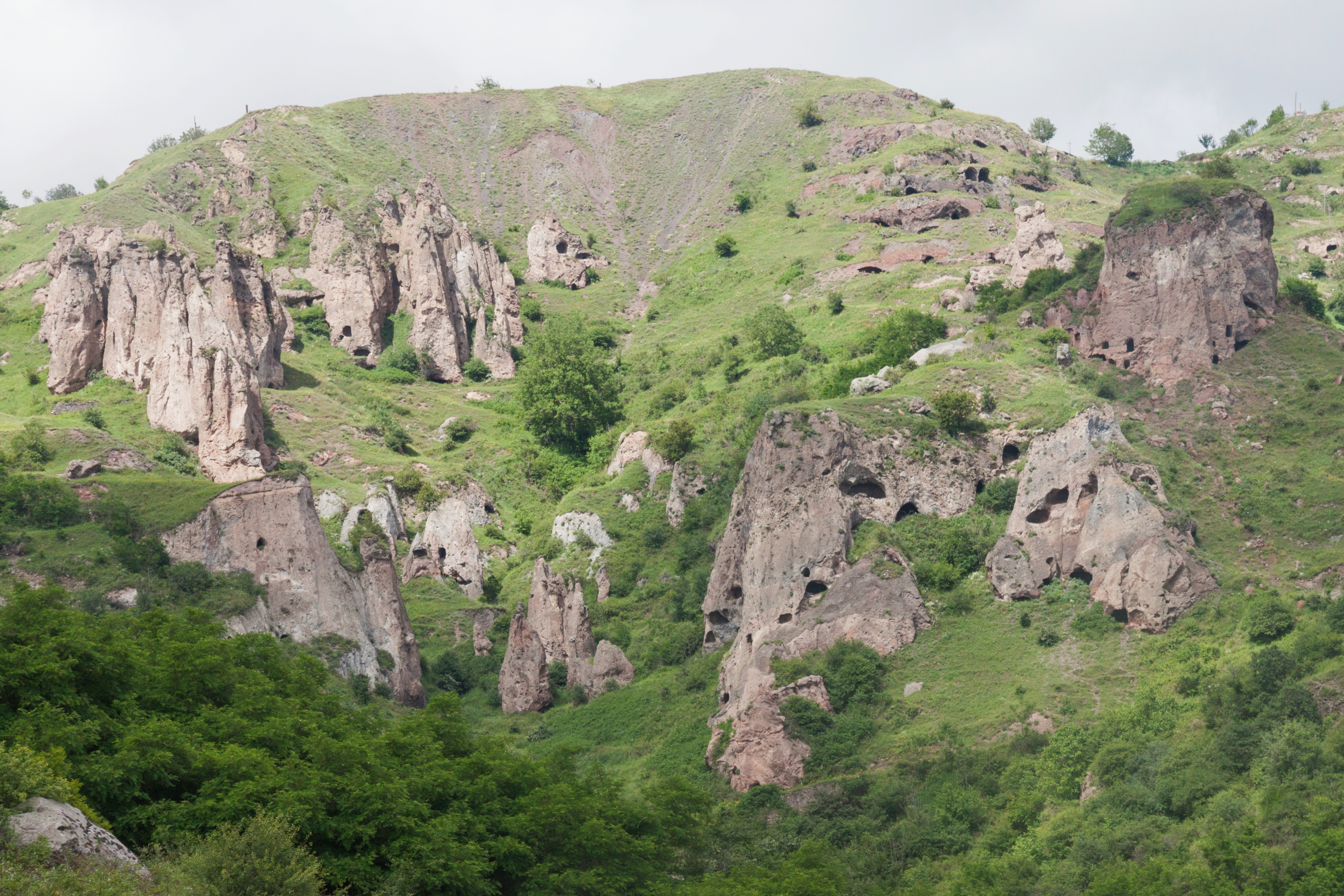
Rock formations and caves

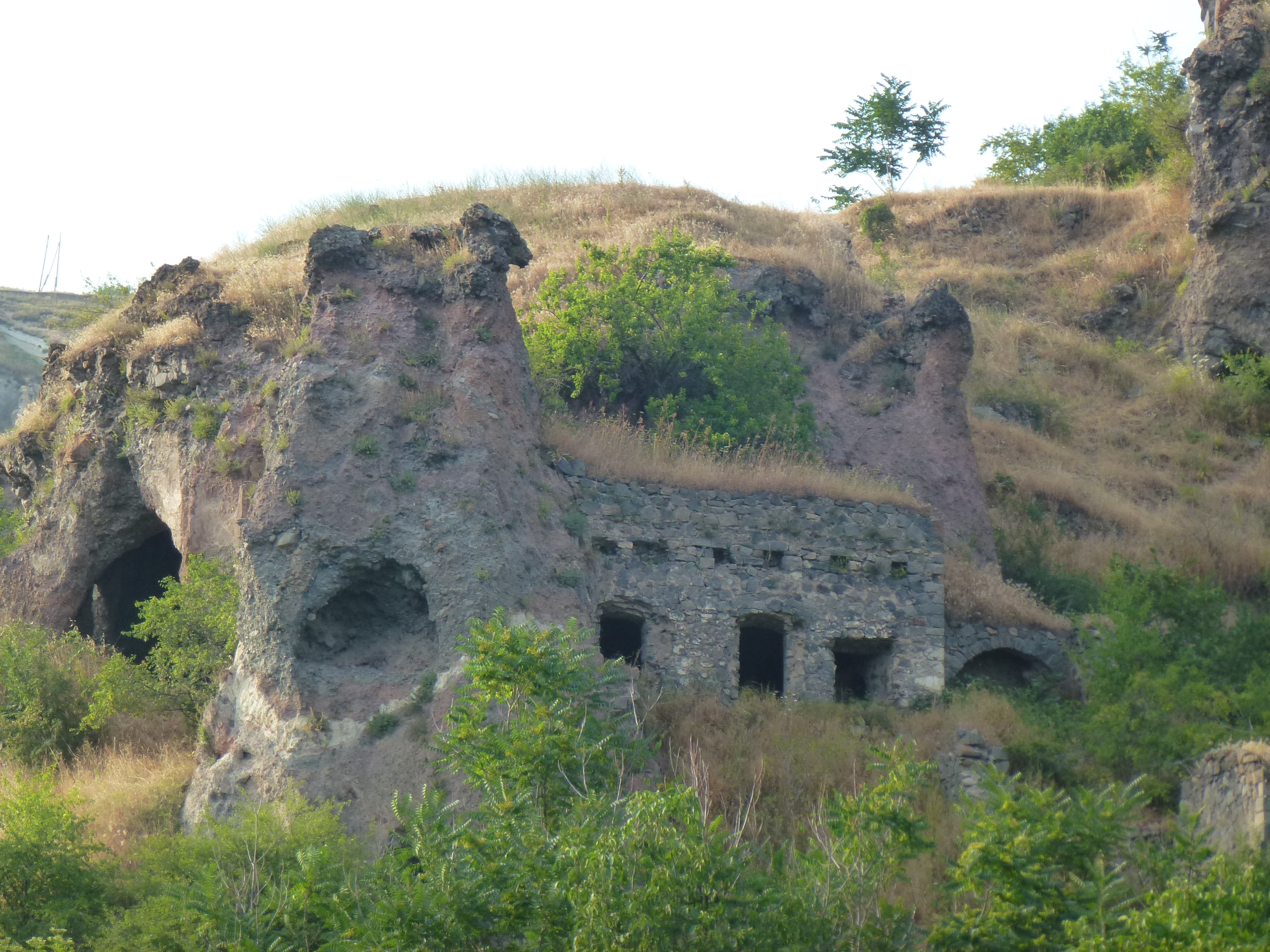
Detail of artificial cave and construction

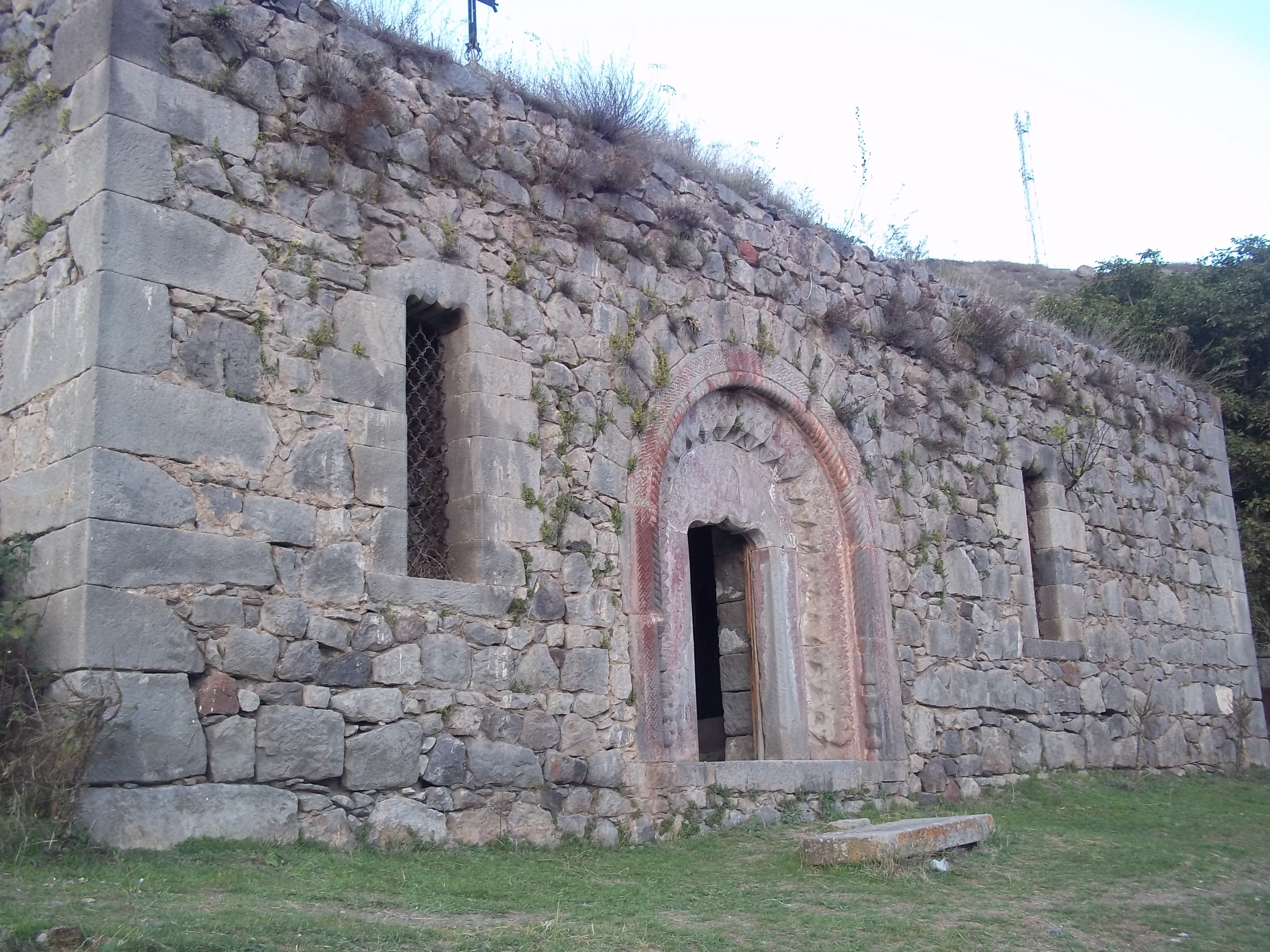

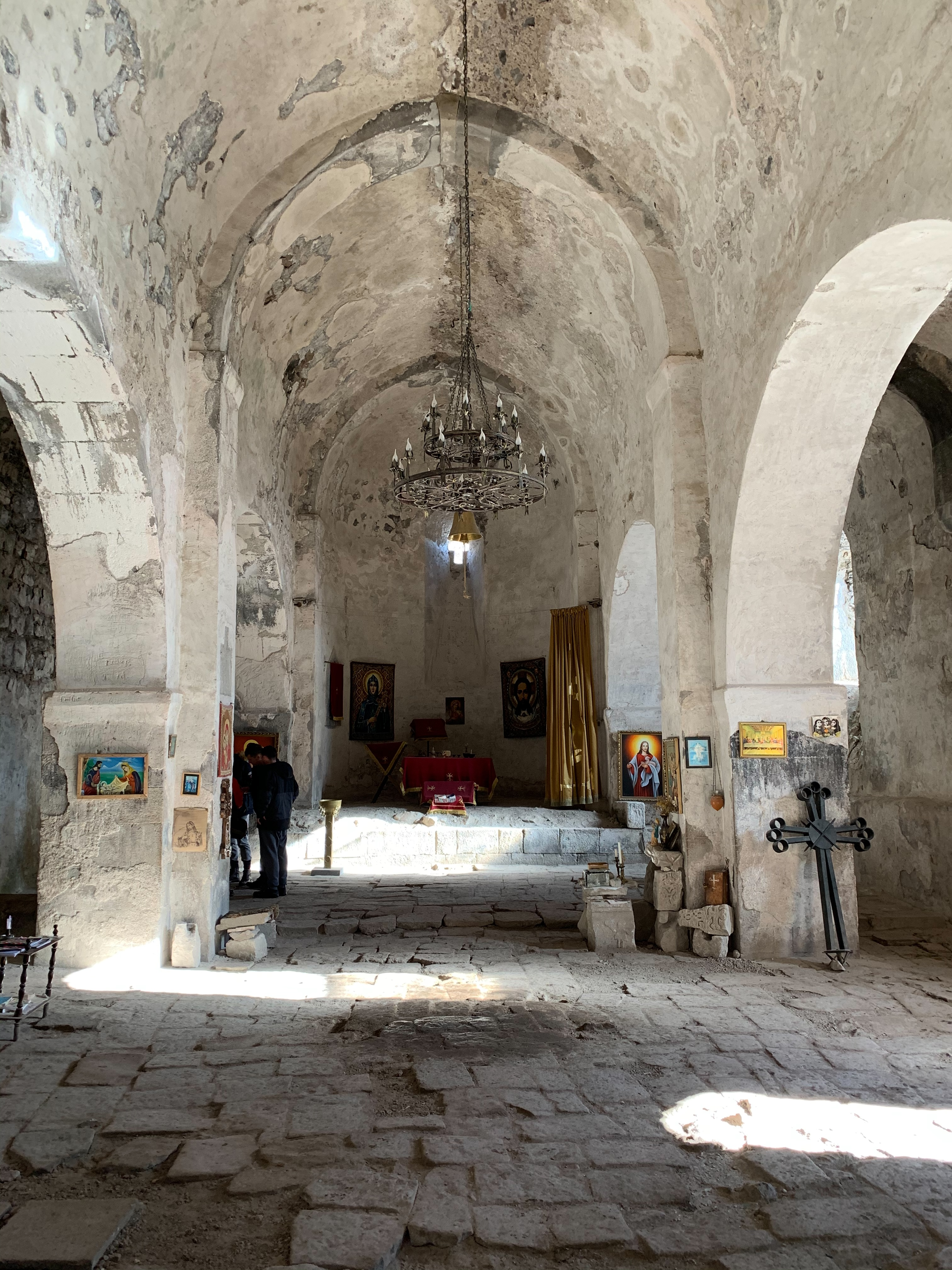

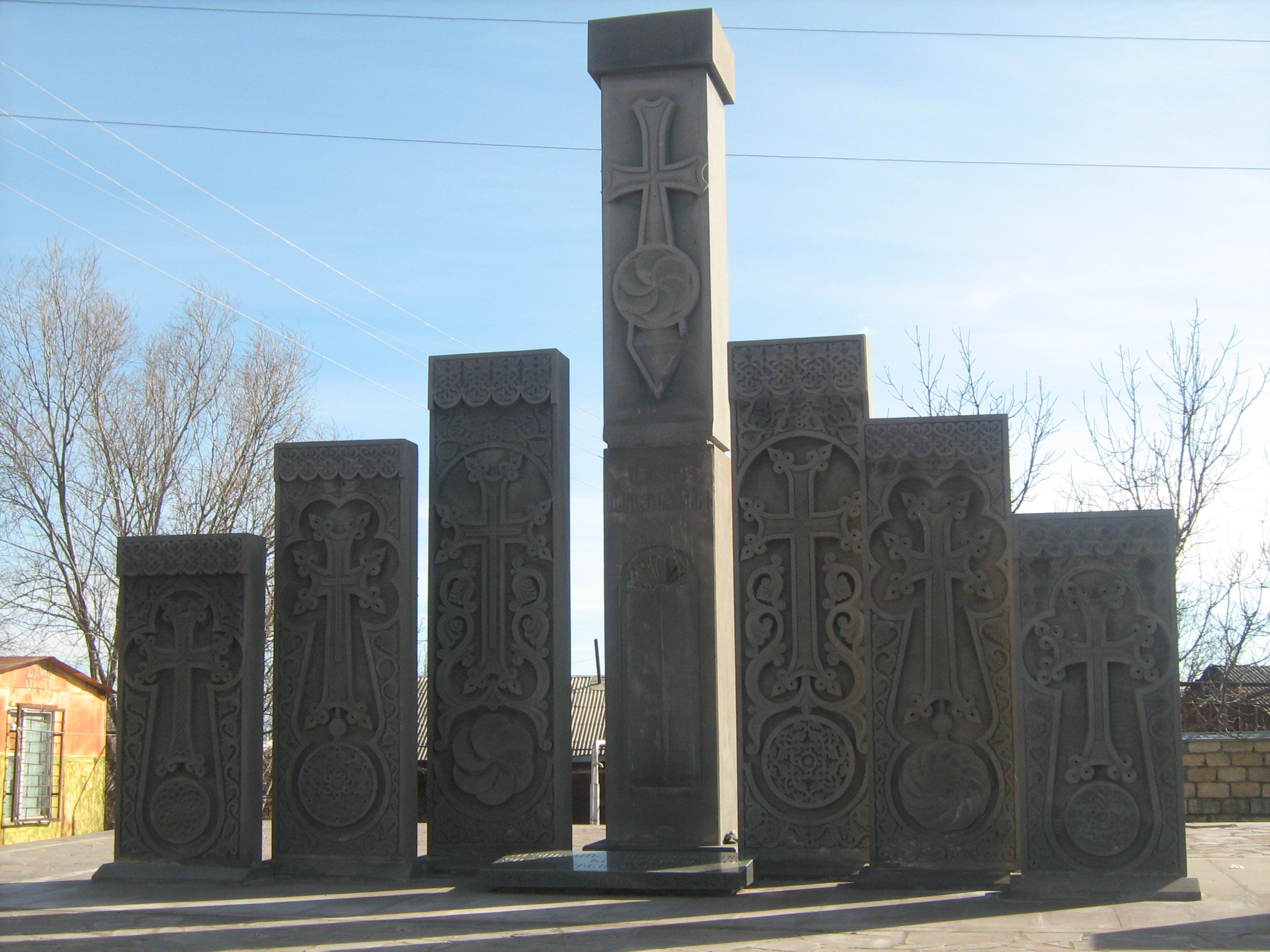

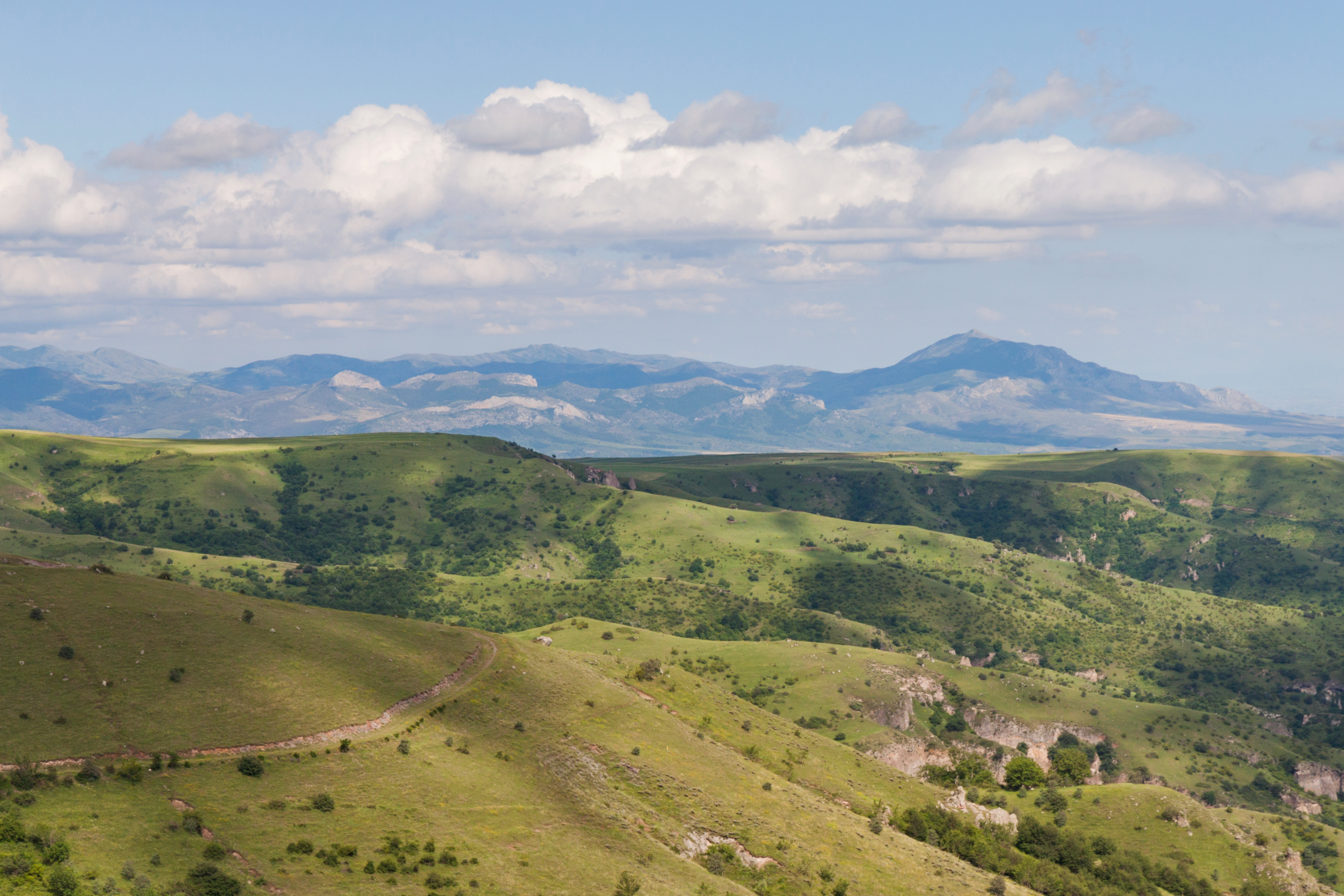

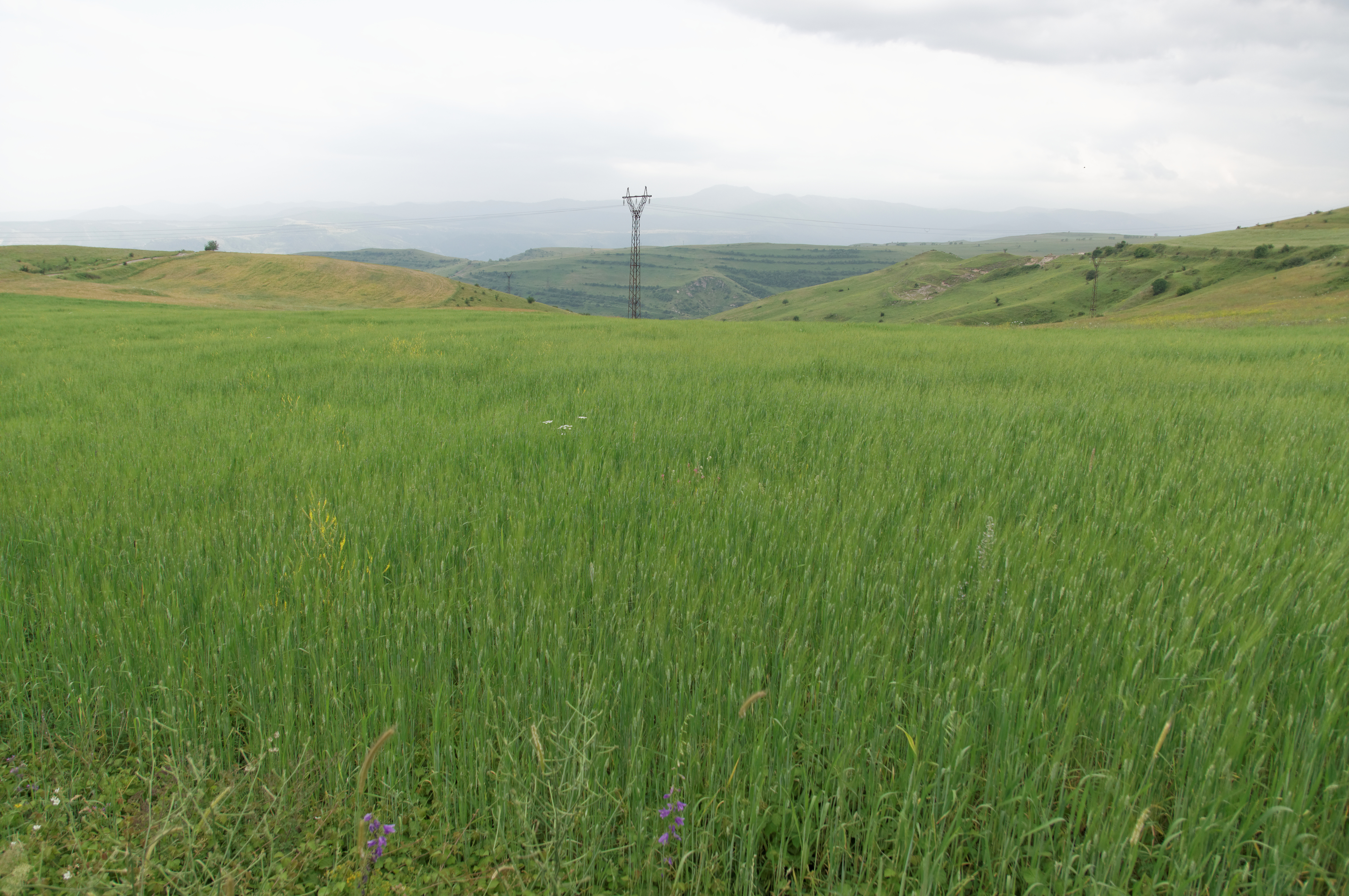

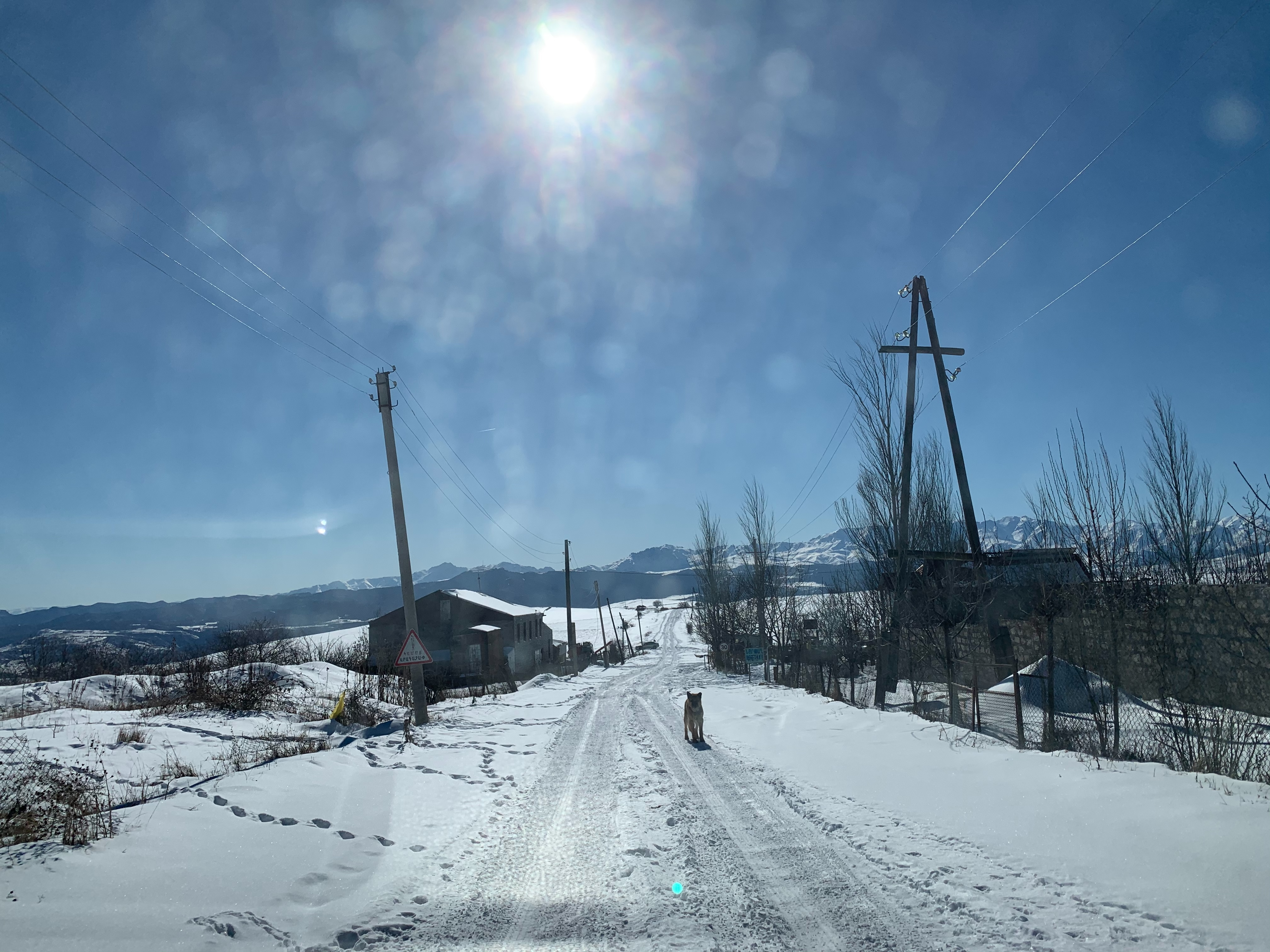

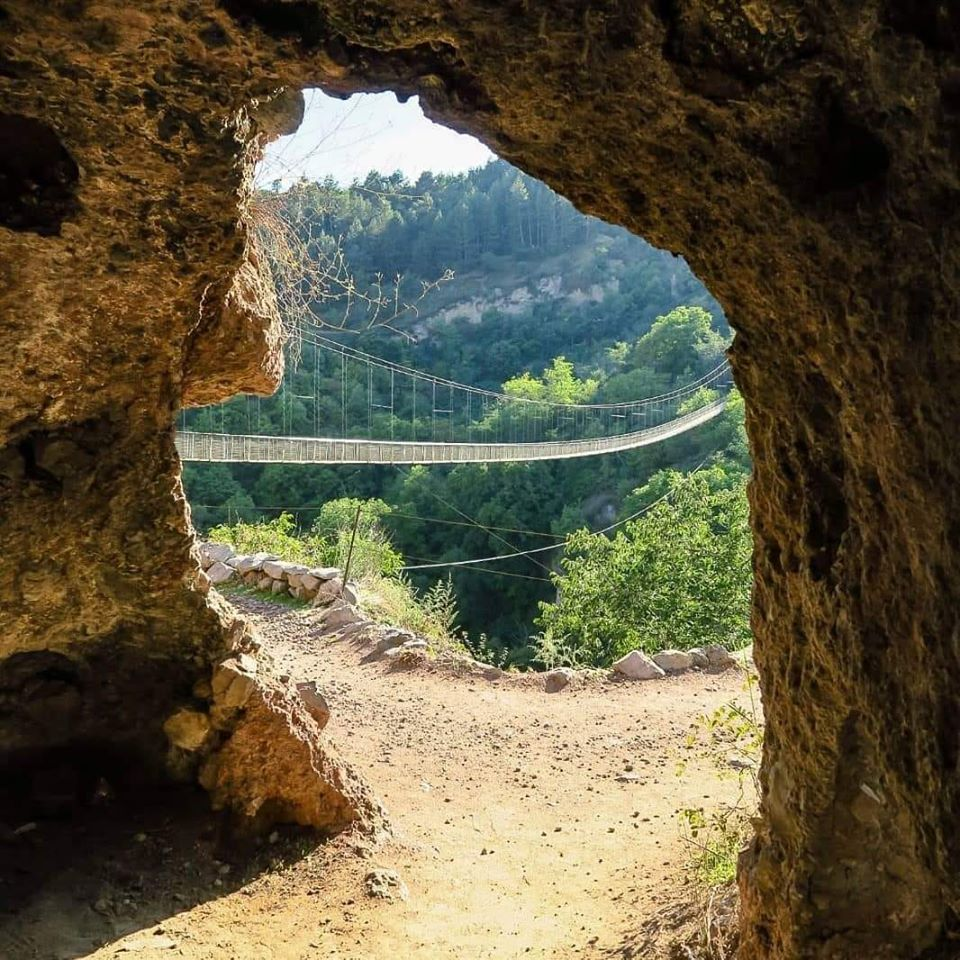

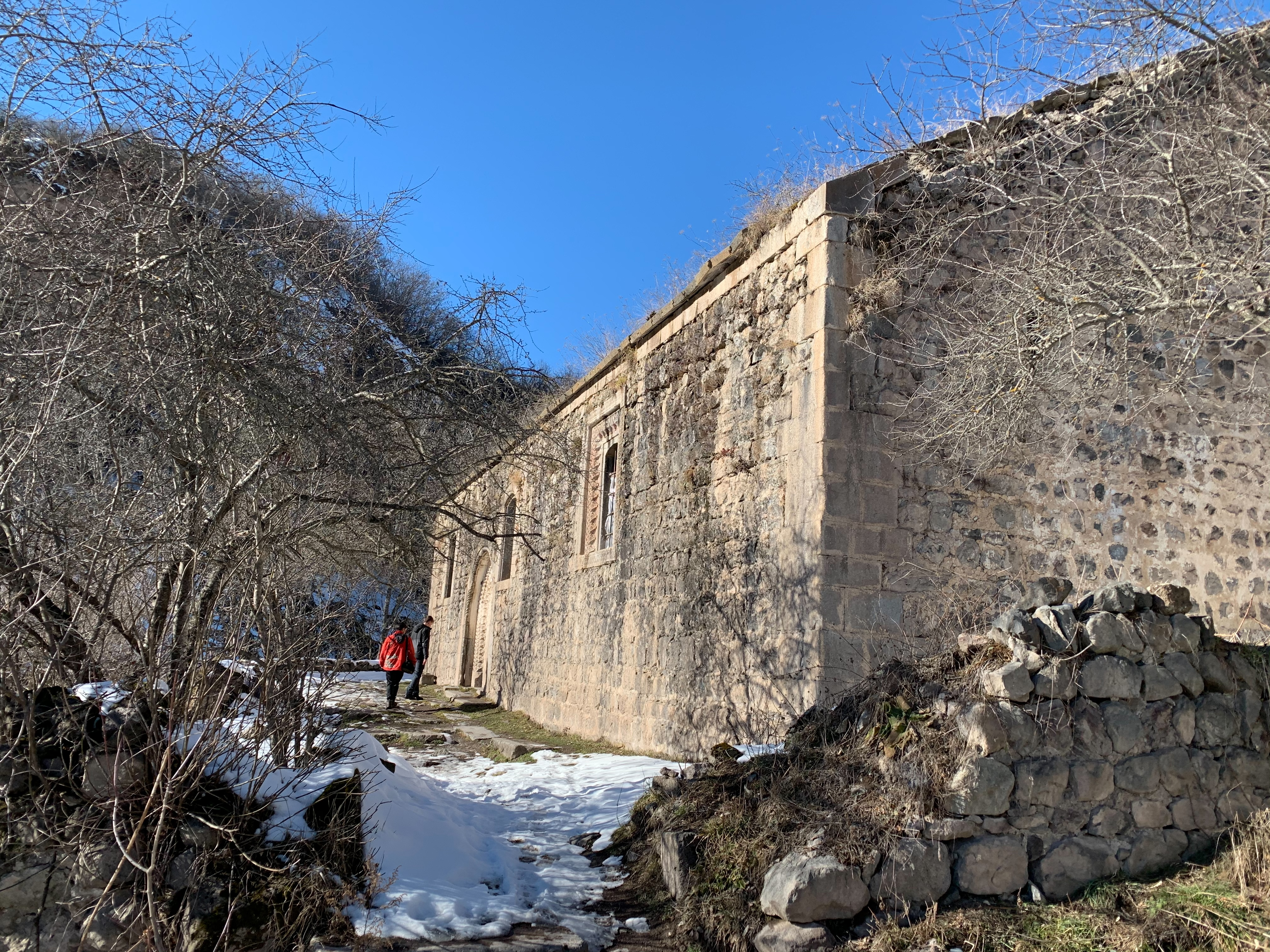

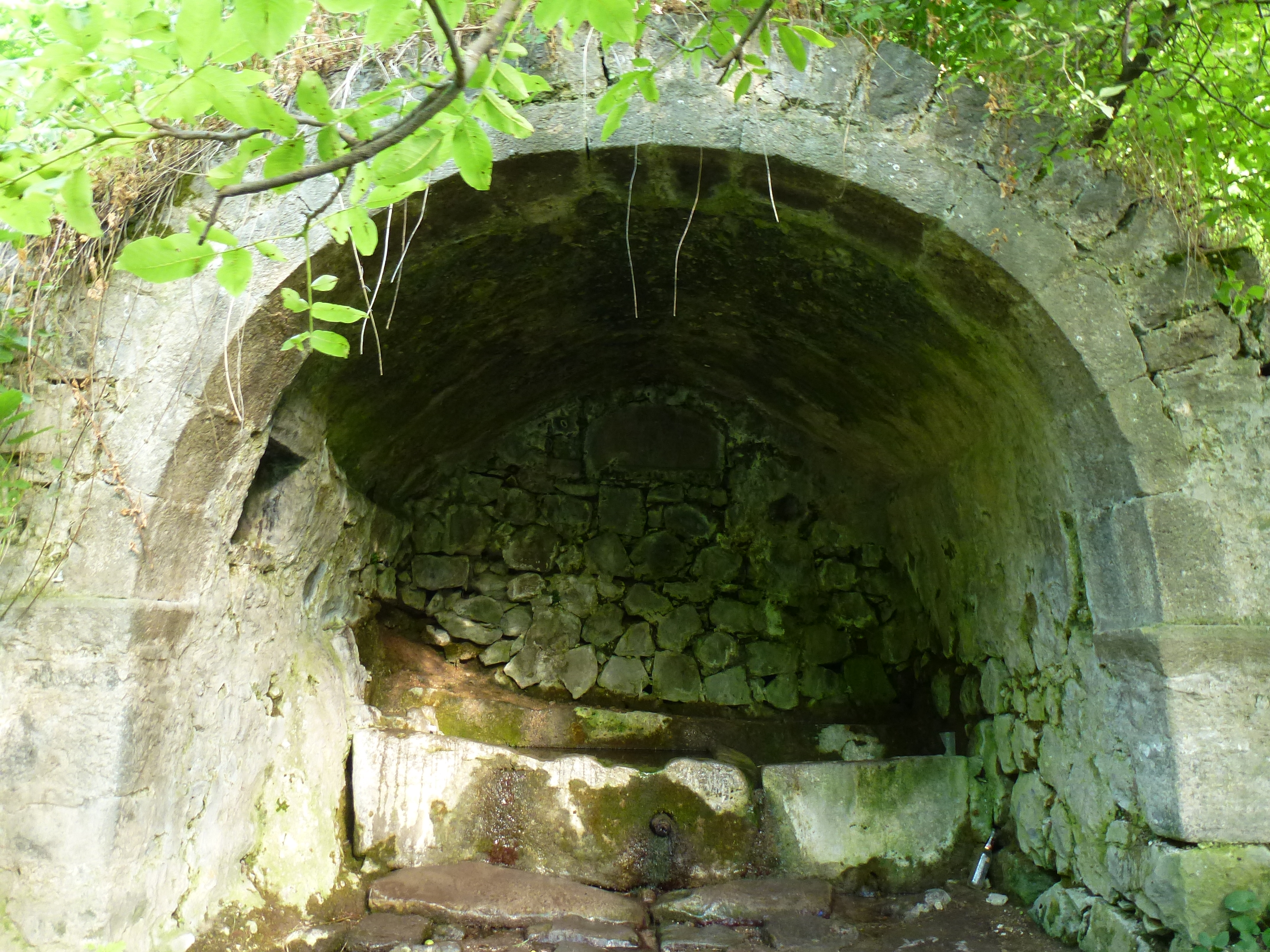

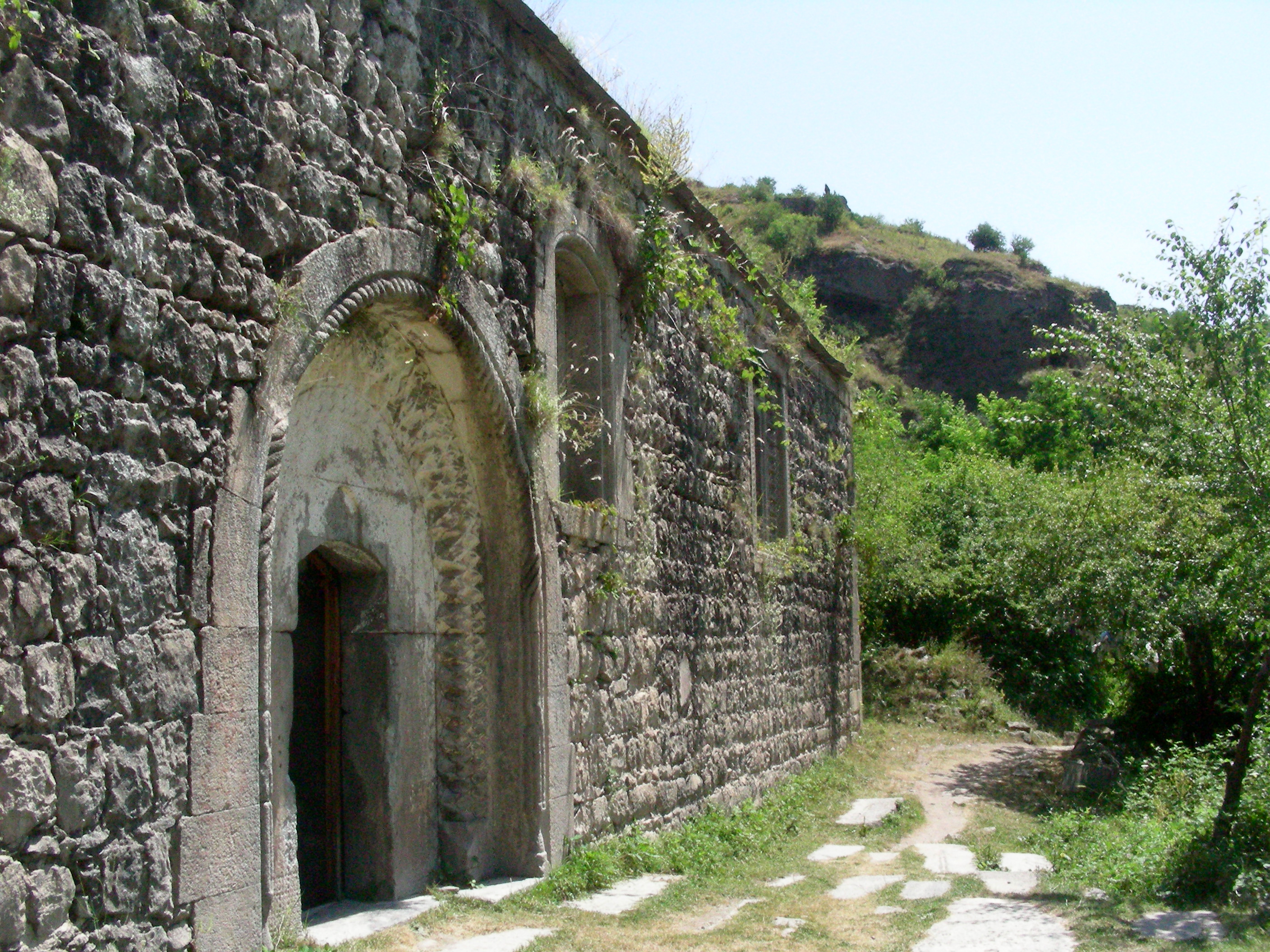

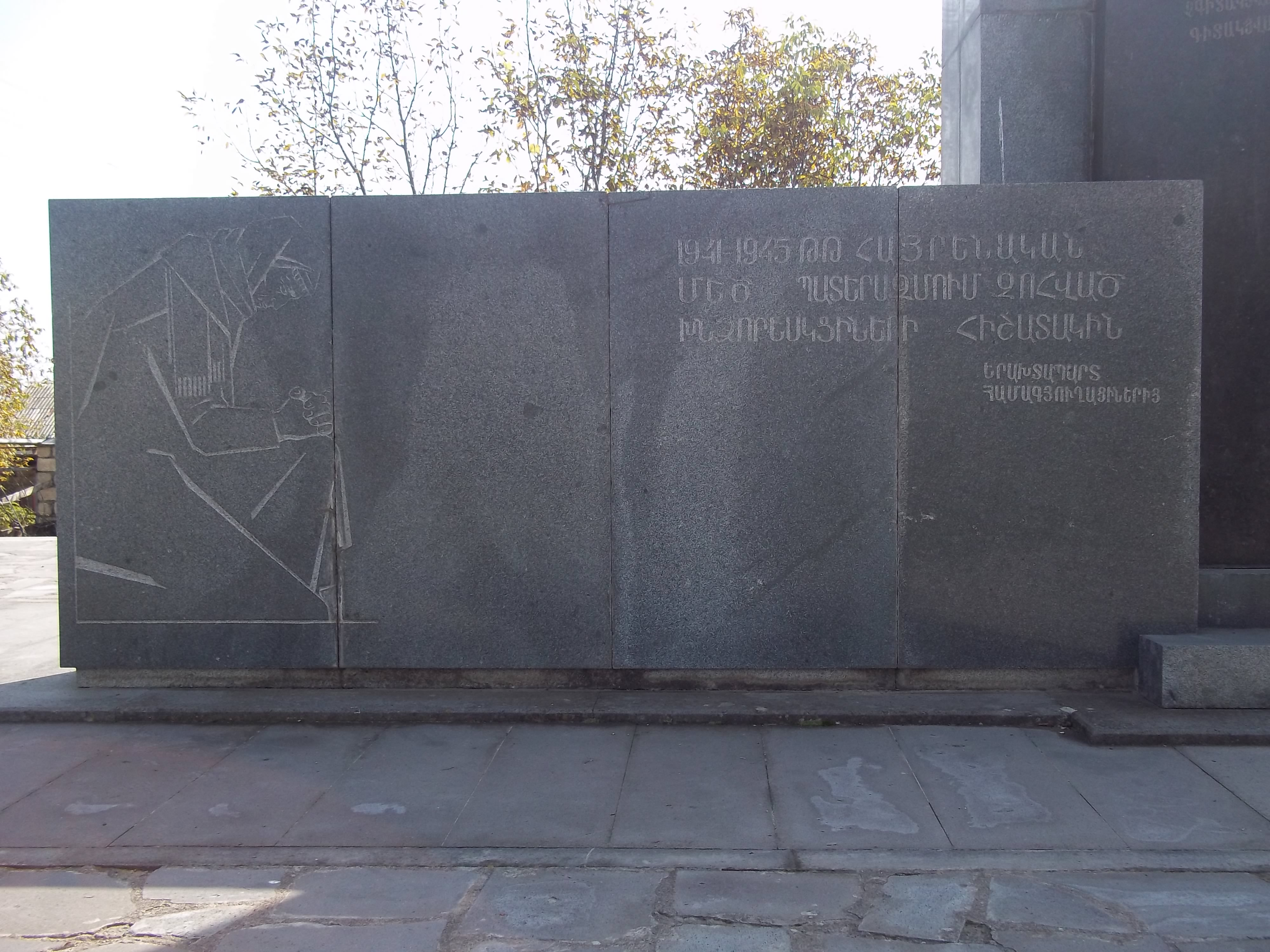
