= Armenia–Azerbaijan border =

International border

Coordinates: 40°18′N 45°50′E

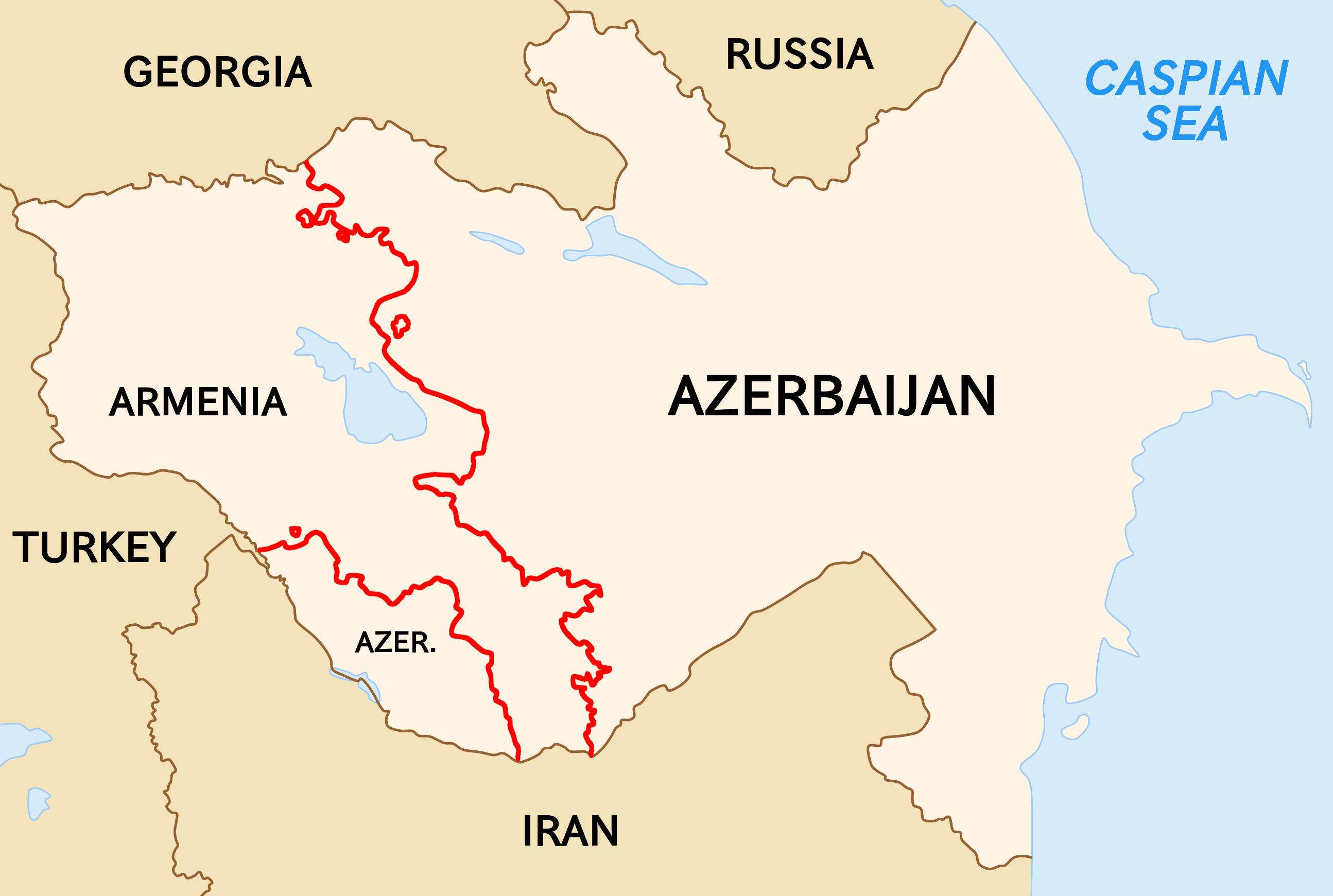
Armenia–Azerbaijan state border, marked in red

The Armenia–Azerbaijan border (Armenian: Հայաստան–Ադրբեջան սահման, romanized: Hayastan–Adrbejan sahman; Azerbaijani: Azərbaycan–Ermənistan sərhədi) is the international border between the Republic of Armenia and the Republic of Azerbaijan. Estimates of the border's length vary from 996 km (619 mi) to 1,007.1 km (625.8 mi). European routes E002 and E117 cross the border.

The de jure border follows that of the former Armenian Soviet Socialist Republic and the Azerbaijan Soviet Socialist Republic and consists of two main segments – that between Armenia and Azerbaijan's Nakhchivan exclave in the west, and the longer section between Armenia and 'mainland' Azerbaijan to the east. Additionally, there are a number of enclaves on either side of the boundary, however these no longer exist except in a de jure sense. The borders between Armenia and Azerbaijan have been closed since 1989 due to the Turkish and Azeri blockade of Armenia, which aimed to suppress the Karabakh Movement which called for independence from Azerbaijan and reunification with Armenia.

Following Armenia's defeat in the Second Nagorno-Karabakh War, a border crisis began with numerous instances of incursions and occupations by Azeri forces of Armenian territory. In October 2022, the two countries reached an agreement that Soviet-era borders should form the basis of border delineation based on the Alma-Ata 1991 Declaration, and Armenia returned four villages within Azerbaijan's de-jure border which Armenia controlled since 1990s. Azerbaijan continues to occupy 215 square kilometers of Armenian territory.

Armenian and Azerbaijani boundary markers

== Geography ==
=== Western (Nakhchivan) section ===
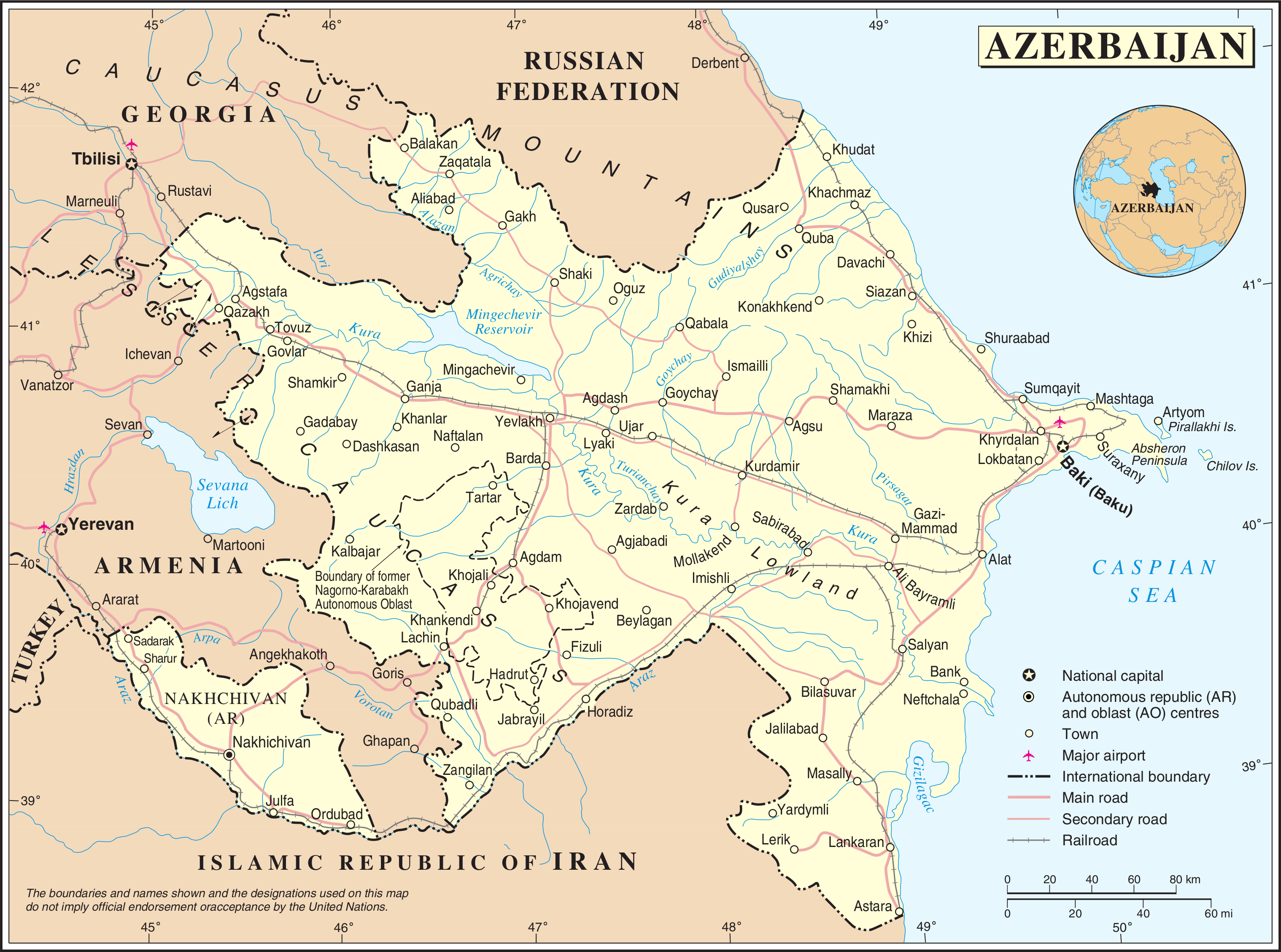
Map of Azerbaijan depicting the de jure Armenia-Azerbaijan border

The border starts in the north at the tripoint with Turkey on the Aras river, and proceeds overland in a south-easterly direction along various mountain ridges, such as the Zangezur Mountains, down to the western tripoint with Iran on the Aras. Additionally, the Azerbaijani enclave of Karki/Tigranashen lies just north of the border, however since May 1992, following the First Nagorno-Karabakh War, Karki has been controlled by Armenia, which administers the 19 km^{2} (7.3 sq mi) territory as part of its Ararat Province.

=== Eastern section ===
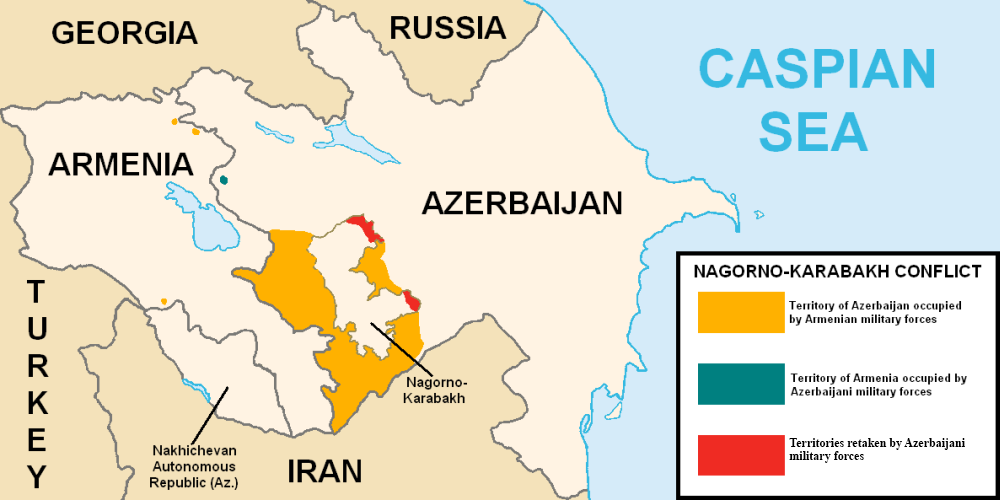
The de facto border in 2019. Armenian forces controlled most of Nagorno-Karabakh and almost 9% of Azerbaijan's territory outside it, and Azerbaijani forces controlled Shahumian and the eastern parts of Martakert and Martuni

The border starts in the north at the tripoint with Georgia and proceeds overland in a broadly south-easterly direction, zigzagging next to and around the Voskepar river, crossing through part of the Joghaz Water Reservoir at the mouth of the Voskepar, and touching the western tip of the Abbasbayli Water Reservoir. It then forms a broad concave arc along the Khndzorut Range and down to the Miapor Range. It then runs parallel with the eastern shore of Lake Sevan along the Sevan Range, runs south along the Eastern Sevan Range, and then west along the Vardenis Range before turning sharply east, thus creating an Azeri protrusion encompassing Böyük Alagöl lake. It then proceeds southwards, crossing the Aylakh-Lich Lake and Sev Lich State Sanctuary, terminating at the Iranian border on the Aras river. The entire border lies mainly in mountainous terrain, with elevations averaging between 600 m (2,000 ft) and 3,400 m (11,200 ft).

Additionally, in the northern stretch of the boundary area there are one Armenian (Artsvashen) and four Azerbaijani (Karki, Yukhari Askipara, Barxudarlı and Sofulu) exclave villages which are now controlled by their 'host' nation. In addition, since the 1990s, Armenia controlled another 4 villages within the de-jure borders of Azerbaijan: Aşağı Əskipara, Bağanis Ayrum, Qızılhacılı, and Xeyrimli, which were returned to Azerbaijan on 24 May 2024 in accordance with the border delimitation agreement.

== History ==
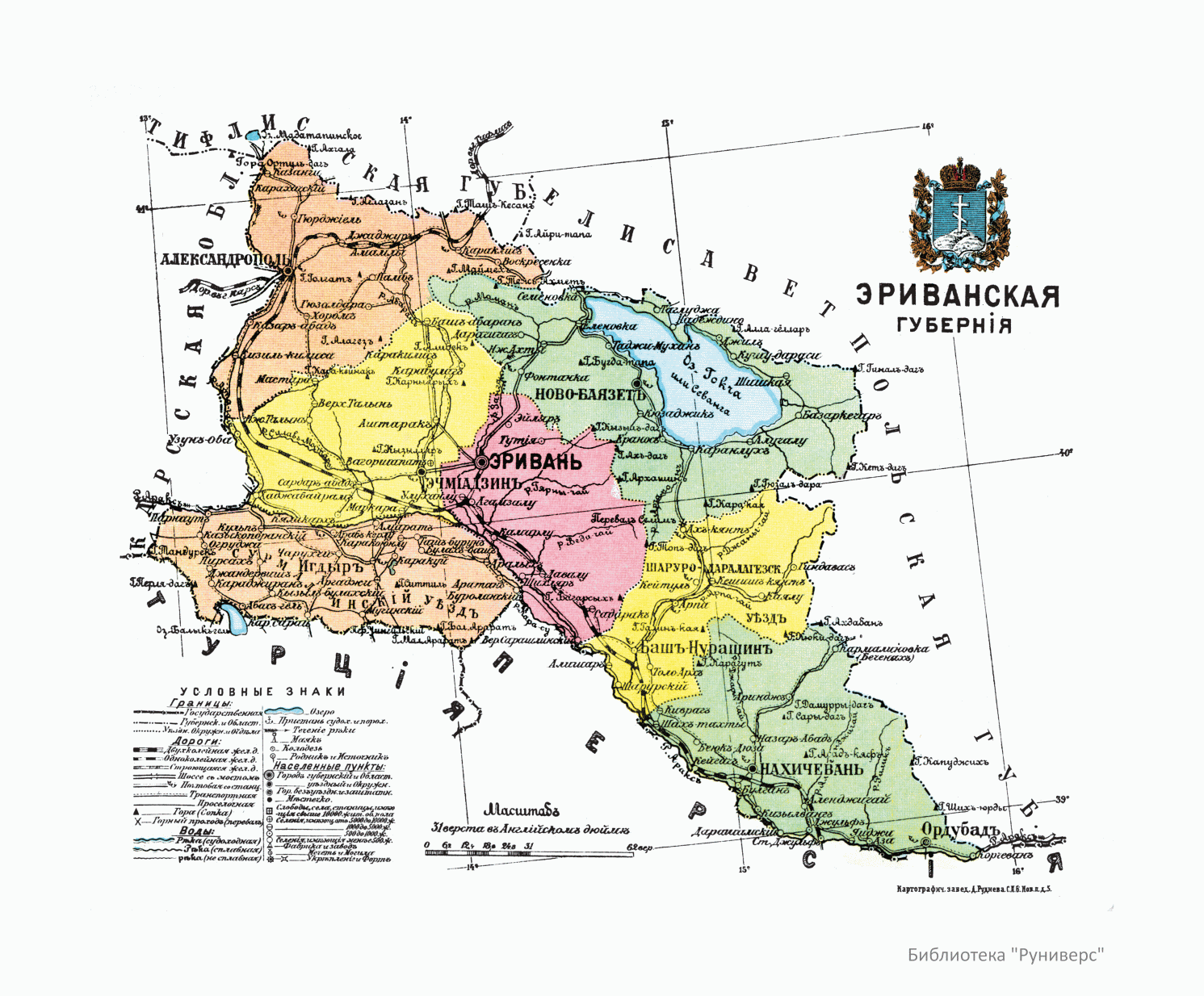
Erivan Governorate

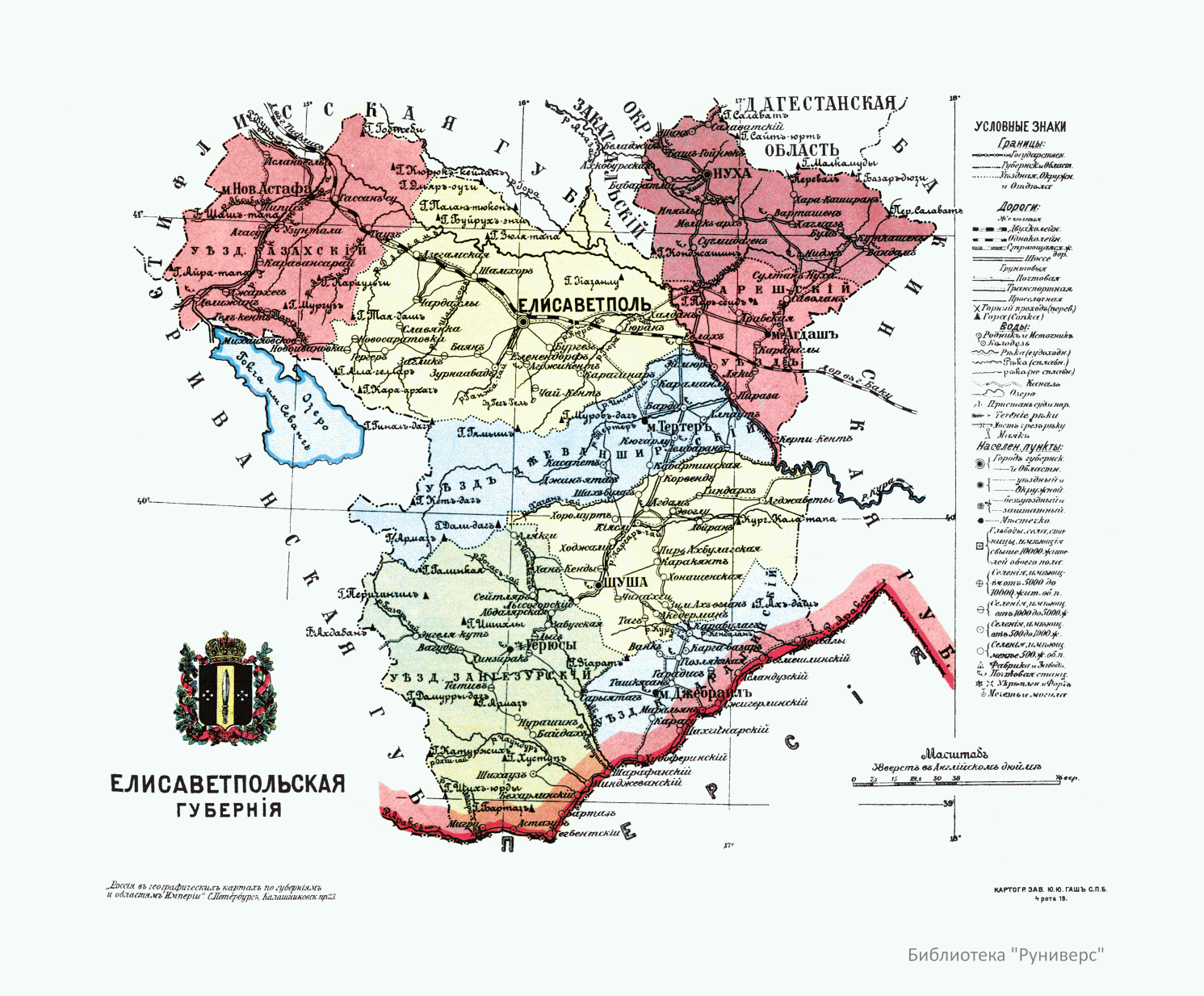
Elisabethpol governorate

Maps of the former Erivan and Elisabethpol governorates

During the 19th century the Caucasus region was contested between the declining Ottoman Empire, Persia and Russia. Over the span of the 1800s, Russia had pushed south at the expense of the Persian and Ottoman Empires. By the Russo-Persian War (1804–1813) and the subsequent Treaty of Gulistan, Russia acquired the bulk of what is now Azerbaijan and part of what is now Armenian's Syunik Province (known as Zangezur within the Russian Empire). Following the Russo-Persian War (1826–1828) and the Treaty of Turkmenchay Persia was forced to cede Nakhchivan and the rest of what is now Armenia.

In 1867 Russia organised its Armenian and Azerbaijani territories into the governorates of Erivan, Tiflis, Baku and Elisabethpol. Relations between Armenians and Azerbaijanis in the governorates were often tense, for example in 1905–07 there was an outbreak of ethnic violence which resulted in thousands of deaths.

Following the Russian Revolution in 1917 the peoples of the southern Caucasus had declared the Transcaucasian Democratic Federative Republic (TDFR) in 1918 and started peace talks with the Ottomans. Internal disagreements led to Georgia leaving the federation in May 1918, followed shortly thereafter by Armenia and Azerbaijan. With the Ottomans having invaded the Caucasus and quickly gained ground, the three new republics were compelled to sign the Treaty of Batum on 4 June 1918, by which they recognised the pre-1878 Ottoman-Russia border, thereby ceding most of Nakhchivan and a considerable part of western Armenia to the Ottomans. Armenia in particular was reeling from the aftermath of the Ottoman-led Armenian genocide, which had resulted in vast numbers of refugees fleeing eastern Turkey. The borders between the three new republics were all disputed. War broke out between Armenia and Azerbaijan over disputed territories along the frontier, lasting from 1918 to 1920, focussing on the disputed areas of Nakhchivan (under the control of the short-lived 'Republic of Aras'), Zangezur and Nagorno-Karabakh.

In April 1920 Russia's Red Army invaded Azerbaijan and Armenia, ending the independence of both, followed in February–March 1921 by Georgia. Fighting continued however in Zangezur, where Armenian forces declared a Republic of Mountainous Armenia and continued to fight against the Bolsheviks until their defeat in July 1921. The Soviet Kavbiuro was tasked with drawing borders between the three former republics in the Caucasus. Armenian control of Zangezur was confirmed in late 1920. In March 1921 Nakhchivan, despite having earlier being promised to Armenia, was allotted to Azerbaijan, partly at the insistence of the new Republic of Turkey via the Treaty of Moscow. On 3 June 1921 the Kavbiuro decided that Nagorno-Karabakh would be included within Armenia, however disputes between the Armenian and Azerbaijani delegates over the issues continued. On 4 July a final Kavbiuro meeting took place to settle the issue, which confirmed the earlier decision to include Nagorno-Karabakh within Armenia. However the next day this decision was reversed and it was granted to Azerbaijan on the proviso that it was granted autonomous oblast status. The precise reasons for the sudden volte-face remain unclear: some scholars think that Joseph Stalin influenced the decision, whereas others (such as Arsène Saparov) point to the fact that the final meeting coincided with Soviet victory in Zangezur and the defeat of the Republic of Mountainous Armenia, after which the Azerbaijanis were able to press their claims more forcefully and the Soviets had little incentive to appease the Armenian side. Also in the period of 1921-1922 districts of Kazah, Akstafa and partially the district of Tauz were part of Armenian SSR

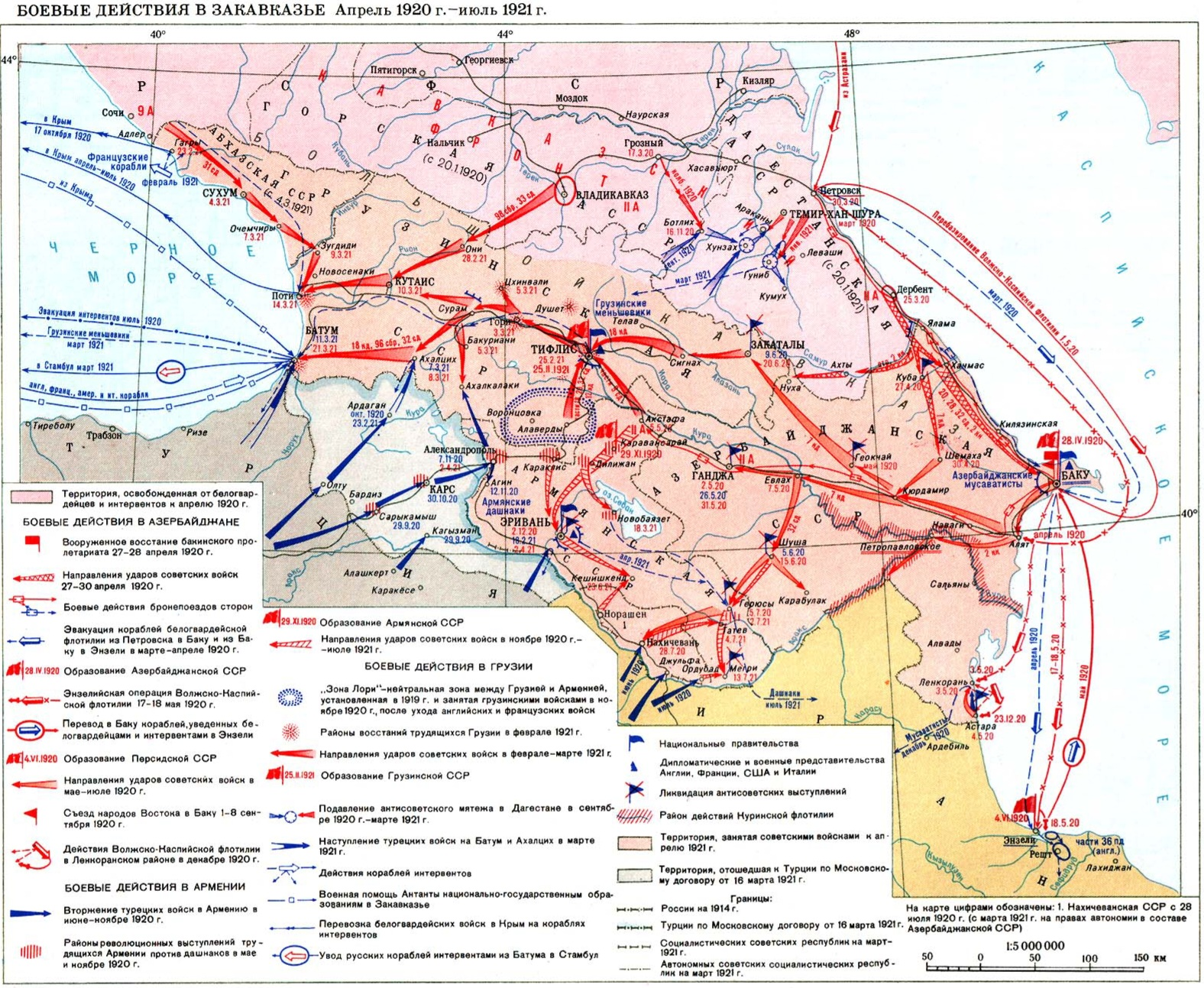
The Transcaucasian Soviet Republics' borders in March 1921, when the 1921 Treaty of Moscow was ratified

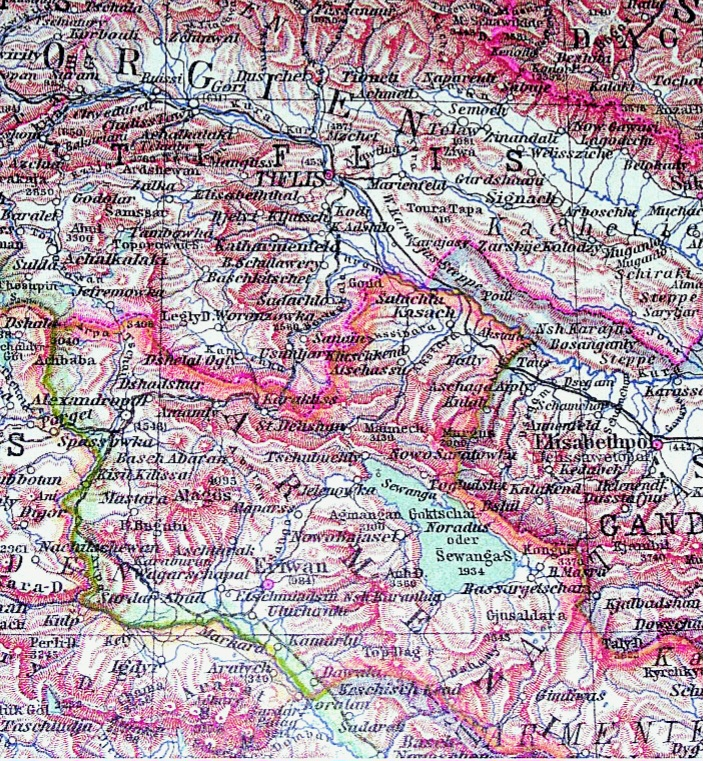
Kazakh is a part of Armenian Soviet Republic as per 1921

In 1922 all three states were incorporated into the Transcaucasian SFSR within the USSR, before being separated in 1936. From 1923 to 1929 the strip of land in Azerbaijan between Nagorno-Karabakh and Armenia was designated as the Kurdistansky Uyezd, known colloquially as Red Kurdistan, later renamed the Kurdistan okrug, and then dissolved in 1930.

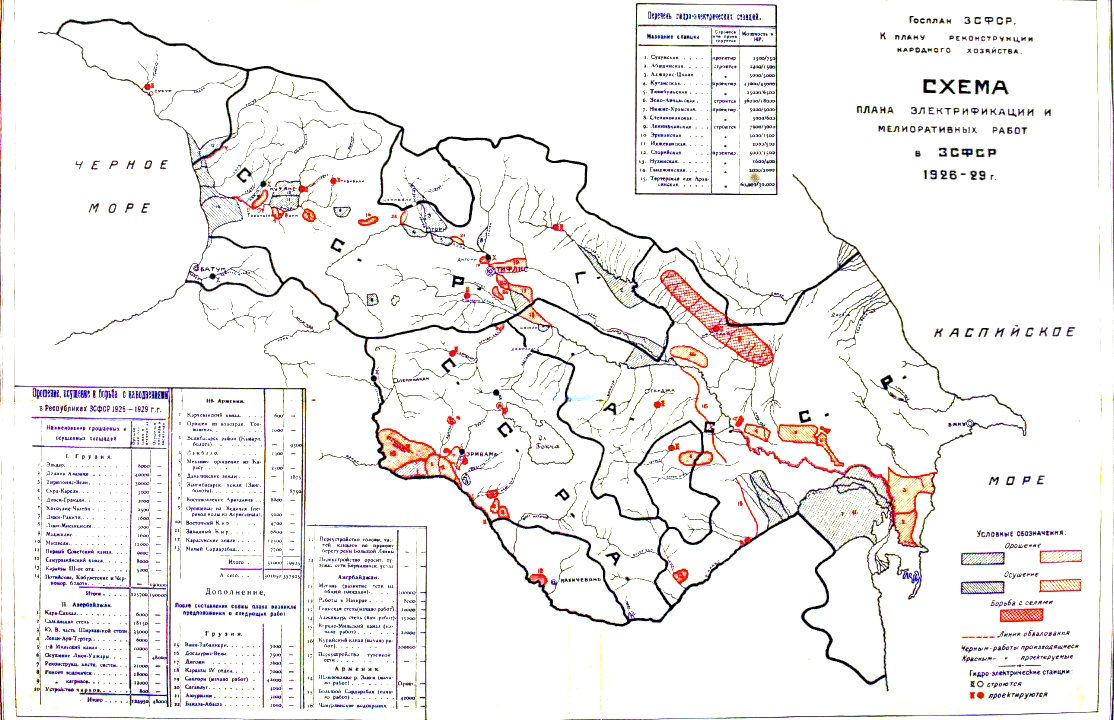
Official scheme of the plan for electrification and reclamation work in the ZSFSR in 1926–29, a plan for the reconstruction of the national economy. "Gosplan of the ZSFSR" 1922-1926

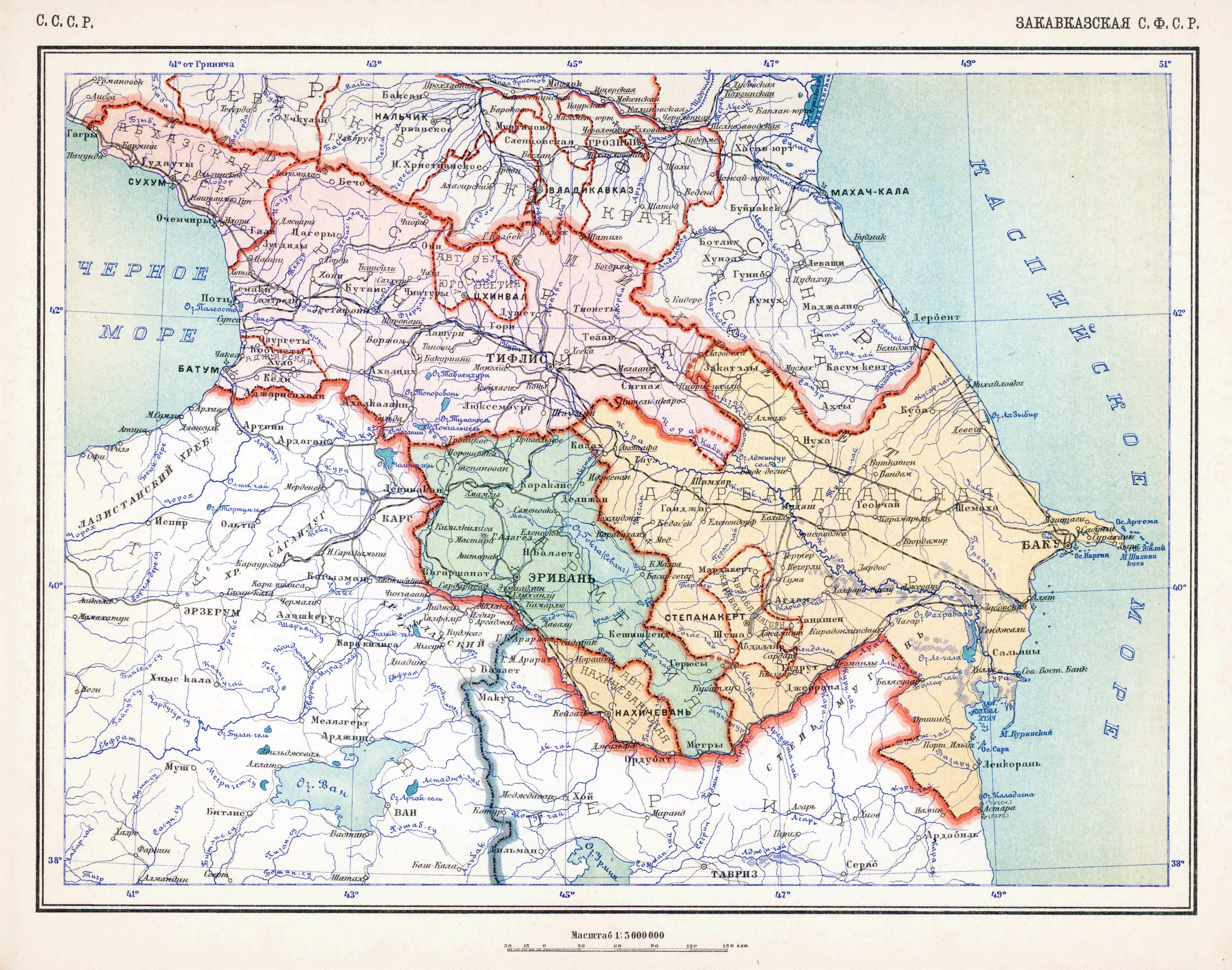
1928 map of the Transcaucasian SFSR

The Azerbaijani officials were deeply reluctant to grant Nagorno-Karabakh autonomous status, and thereafter dragged their feet. They proposed instead to create a larger Karabakh oblast encompassing both lowland and highland areas, which would thereby dilute the Armenian majority in the highland areas. The Armenians raised the slow progress with Soviet authorities, who in turn pressured the Azerbaijanis to press on with the creation of the autonomous oblast. On 7 July 1923 they duly announced that a Nagorno-Karabakh Autonomous Oblast (NKAO) was to be formed. An initial border was decided upon in July 1923, with amendments made later in the same month so as to include Shusha and the Khonashen (Martuni) and Skobolevskoe lowland regions within the NKAO. The issue dragged on into the following year, with a final announcement of the NKAO's borders not being published until 26 November 1924. The boundary thus announced was not a formal, demarcated line as such, but rather a list of the 201 villages which were to be included within the NKAO. The border was then changed again in 1925 so as to include more villages in the NKAO. The boundary that thus emerged used at times geographic and pre-existing administrative lines, but was predominantly based on ethnographic factors.

Over the following decades Armenia pressed for the inclusion of NKAO within the Armenian SSR, notably in the post-Second World War period when the USSR was pushing its territorial claims against Turkey (later dropped) and again in 1960 following the transfer of Crimea from Russia to Ukraine. In 1965 large protests took place in Yerevan calling for greater recognition of the Armenian genocide, with many also calling for the transfer of NKAO to Armenia. Allegations of discrimination against Armenians in the NKAO by Azerbaijan's government continued, with many claiming that Azerbaijanis were being encouraged to move so as to alter the demographic balance in their favour. Mikhail Gorbechev’s announcement of glasnost and perestroika in 1987 allowed these frustrations to be publicly vented, and Armenians began openly pressing for the transfer of NKAO to Armenia. Protests escalated throughout 1988 with increasingly violence, culminating in the Sumgait pogrom in which 32 Armenians were killed. The violence caught Moscow unawares – they introduced direct rule in January 1989, and sent in troops to Azerbaijan in 1990 following further violence.

The boundary became an international frontier in 1991 following the dissolution of the Soviet Union and the declaration of independence by Armenia, Azerbaijan and Nagorno-Karabakh in 1991. Azerbaijan abolished the NKAO, sparking a full-scale war with Armenia. The war ended in a ceasefire in 1994. This left Armenia in control of the vast majority of Nagorno-Karabakh, organised as the Republic of Artsakh, and much of Azerbaijan proper, including the strategically vital Lachin Corridor. Since then the conflict has remained frozen, creating the modern de facto border between the two countries which follows the de jure Soviet-era border only in its northern half. Since the ceasefire relations between the two countries remain extremely tense and there have been numerous flare-ups of fighting along the border, notably in 2008, 2010, 2012, 2014, 2016, 2018, and a war in 2020. While the border has not been formally demarcated, both sides agree it should be based on Soviet maps.

=== Pre-2020 de facto borders ===
As noted, the de jure border follows that of the former Armenian Soviet Socialist Republic and the Azerbaijan Soviet Socialist Republic and consists of two main segments – that between Armenia and Azerbaijan's Nakhchivan exclave in the west, and the longer section between Armenia and 'mainland' Azerbaijan to the east. As also noted, there are a number of enclaves on either side of the boundary, however these no longer exist except in de jure sense. For nearly 30 years until the conclusion of the 2020 Karabakh war the de facto situation was more complex – the western Nakhchivan segment of the boundary was not disputed (minus the Karki/Tigranashen enclave). However the eastern segment was. From the conflict over Nagorno-Karabakh in the 1990s until late 2020, the de jure eastern border held only in the north, with the southern section of the border being formed by a 'Line of Contact' that ran deep into Azerbaijani territory, encompassing not only most of Nagorno-Karabakh but large parts of Azerbaijan proper; Armenia organised this territory into the self-declared Republic of Artsakh, with the border between Armenia and Artsakh running along the de jure Armenia–Azerbaijan border. In late 2020 Azerbaijan took back the occupied territory and parts of Nagorno-Karabakh, with Russian forces stationed in the Lachin corridor connecting Karabakh to Armenia proper. Until mid 2020, the de facto border followed the de jure border southwards from the Georgian tripoint down to Mount Hinaldag. From there the 'Line of Contact' then formed the Armenia–Azerbaijan border for all practical purposes; it proceeded eastwards along the Murovdag mountains, turning south-eastwards near the village of Talish, and continued down to the Iranian border on the Aras river. The area west of this line was organised into the Republic of Artsakh, a self-declared state recognised only by a handful of other non-sovereign entities, functioning effectively as a semi-autonomous part of Armenia. The southern half of the de jure Armenia–Azerbaijan border was during the period retained as the Armenia-Artsakh border. Artsakh encompassed most of the territory of the former Nagorno-Karabakh Autonomous Oblast within Azerbaijan (except for some small areas on its northern and eastern edges), as well as large parts of adjacent Azerbaijani territory.

=== Post-2020 Demarcation Efforts ===
In April 2024, Armenia and Azerbaijan began demarcating their common border based on Soviet-era maps, as a first step towards a potential peace agreement. On April 19, the two countries reached an agreement whereby Armenia handed over four abandoned villages along the border with Tavush Province to Azerbaijan: Bağanis Ayrum, Aşağı Əskipara, Xeyrimli, and Qızılhacılı, all formerly part of the Azerbaijani Soviet Socialist Republic's Qazax District and taken over by Armenia in the 1990s. This condition, imposed by Azerbaijan as a prerequisite for the peace treaty, was described by Armenian Prime Minister Nikol Pashinyan as an alternative to war, although the decision led to backlash in Armenia. Protests erupted in the country, with former residents of two of the villages blocking traffic on the Armenia–Georgia highway near Lake Sevan, Noyemberyan and other places, as sections of the highway risked being handed over.

On April 23, Armenian and Azerbaijani teams began to survey a section of the border, and the first boundary markers were simultaneously placed by both countries. Azerbaijani President Ilham Aliyev supported a proposal from Kazakhstan to host talks between foreign ministers, but stated that this did not constitute international mediation, and that the latter was not needed. A replacement of Russian guards currently posted at the border by Armenian and Azerbaijani border guards was also announced by Nikol Pashinyan.

== Border crossings ==
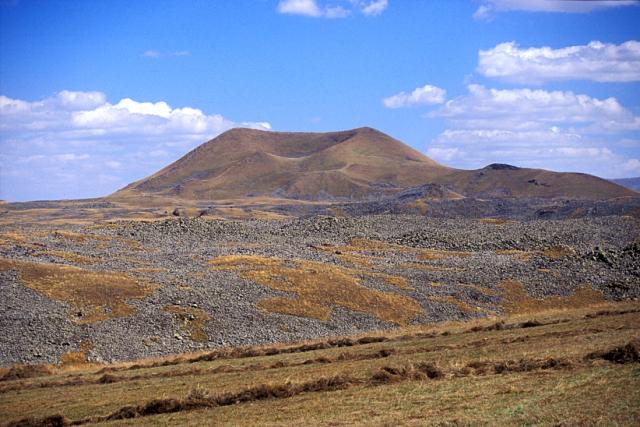
The volcanic field of Porak volcano (called Akharbakhar in Azerbaijan), which straddles the Armenia–Azerbaijan border

The border between Armenia and Azerbaijan has been formally closed since 1989 and the area heavily militarized; however, between 1992 and 2023 a humanitarian corridor known as the Lachin corridor between Armenia and Nagorno-Karabakh remained open.

Until Armenia secured the Lachin corridor in 1992, the Armenians of Nagorno-Karabakh were entirely isolated, relying solely on their own limited resources and aid flown in from Armenia. Following the 2020 Nagorno-Karabakh ceasefire agreement, Armenia conceded control of the corridor to a Russian peacekeeping force. In 2022, the government of Azerbaijan re-imposed a siege of Nagorno-Karabakh which involved blocking the Lachin corridor. These actions were criticized by numerous countries, international organizations and human rights groups, many of which considered them to be a violation of the ceasefire agreement that ended the Second Nagorno-Karabakh War. In 2023, Azerbaijan launched a military operation which resulted in the flight of the entire Armenian population from Nagorno-Karabakh through the Lachin corridor.

== Settlements near the border ==
=== Western (Nakhchivan) section ===
==== Armenia ====
- Yeraskh
- Paruyr Sevak
- Yelpin
- Chiva
- Rind
- Areni
- Amaghu
- Khachik
- Khndzorut
- Nor Aznaberd
- Bardzruni
- Kapuyt
- Shaghat
- Karchevan

==== Azerbaijan ====
- Heydarabad
- Sədərək
- Şahbulaq
- Havuş
- Aşağı Buzqov
- Gərməçataq
- Şada
- Kükü
- Biçənək
- Kilit

=== Eastern section ===
==== Armenia ====
- Berdavan
- Dovegh
- Barekamavan
- Koti
- Voskevan
- Voskepar
- Berkaber
- Vazashen
- Kayan
- Paravakar
- Nerkin Karmiraghbyur
- Aygepar
- Movses
- Chinari
- Aygedzor
- Ttujur
- Chambarak
- Vahan
- Khoznavar
- Vaghatur
- Khnatsakh
- Aravus
- Tegh
- Kornidzor
- Vorotan
- Shurnukh
- Vanand (Ghurdghulagh)
- Davit Bek
- Kaghnut
- Ujanis
- Khdrants
- Eghvard
- Agarak
- Syunik
- Sznak
- Kapan
- Gomaran
- Geghanush
- Chakaten
- Shikahogh
- Srashen
- Nerqin Hand

==== Azerbaijan ====
- Kəmərli
- Fərəhli
- Quşçu Ayrım
- Bağanis Ayrum
- Məzəm
- Qızılhacılı
- Cəfərli
- Bala Cəfərli
- Yaradullu
- Mülkülü
- Köhnəqışlaq
- Koxanəbi
- Ağbulaq
- Sonalar
- Motudərə
- Zamanlı
- Fərzalı
- Göyəlli
- Hüsülü
- Malıbəy
- Malxələf
- Eyvazlı
- Qazançı
- Rəzdərə

== Crossings ==
(Azerbaijan) Azerbaijani checkpoint	Province	(Armenia) Armenian checkpoint	Province	Opened	Route in Azerbaijan	Route in Armenia	Status
Kichik Galadarasi	Lachin	Tegh	Syunik Province	Closed since 2023	Road	Road	Closed
Dəmirçidam	Kalbajar	Sotk	Gegharkunik	Closed since 2020	Road (R19 to Kalbajar)	Road (M11 to Vardenis)	Closed
Agbend	Zangilan	Meghri	Syunik Province	Closed since 1993	Road/ Rail	Road/ Rail	Closed
Kilit	Nakhchivan	Meghri	Syunik Province	Closed since 1993	Road/ Rail	Road/ Rail	Closed
Sadarak	Nakhchivan	Yeraskh	Ararat Province	Closed since 1989	to Baku	to Yerevan	Closed
Qazakh	Gazakh	Ijevan	Tavush Province	Closed since 1990	to Qazakh	to Ijevan	Closed

== See also ==
- Line of Contact (Nagorno-Karabakh)
- Armenia–Azerbaijan relations
- List of border conflicts
