= Geyali =

Geyali may refer to:

- Göyəlli, Azerbaijan
- Gəyəli, Azerbaijan
- Geyali, Zangilan, Azerbaijan
