= Fakhraly =

Fakhraly may refer to:

- Fərəhli, Azerbaijan
- Fəxralı, Azerbaijan
