= Buzqov =

Buzqov or Buzgov or Bizgov may refer to:

- Asağı Buzqov, Azerbaijan
- Yuxarı Buzqov, Azerbaijan
