= Yeni Havuş =

- Municipality
- Location within Azerbaijan
- Coordinates: 39°30′42″N 45°04′26″E
- Country: Azerbaijan
- Autonomous republic: Nakhchivan
- District: Sharur

Population (2005)
  - Total: 196
- Time zone: UTC+4 (AZT)

Yeni Havuş (also, Yeni Havush, New Havush and Havush) is a municipality and village in the Sharur District of Nakhchivan, Azerbaijan. It is located 15 km away from the district center, on the plain. Its population is busy with farming and animal husbandry. It has a population of 196. There are secondary school, library and club in the village. The village was founded by the refugees from the Havuş (Havush) village. (For the etymology and history see the Havuş.)
