= Shahbulaq (disambiguation) =

Shahbulaq, Şahbulaq

- Shahbulaq or Şahbulaq - settlement in Nakhchivan formerly known as Cağazur
- Shah Bulaq - alternate name for Shirin Bolagh village in the Ardabil region of Iran
- Shahbulag Castle - fortress near Agham in Azerbaijan
