= Ttujur =

Ttujur or T’t’ujur or Tytudzhur or Tudzhur or Ttudzhur may refer to:

- Ttujur, Aragatsotn, Armenia
- Ttujur, Gegharkunik, Armenia
