= Mülkülü =

- Municipality
- Location within Azerbaijan
- Coordinates: 40°56′N 45°32′E
- Country: Azerbaijan
- Rayon: Tovuz

Population
  - Total: 987
- Time zone: UTC+4 (AZT)
  - Summer (DST): UTC+5 (AZT)

Mülkülü (also, Mülkiilü and Myul’kyulyu) is a village and municipality in the Tovuz Rayon of Azerbaijan. It has a population of 987.

== See also ==
- Aşağı Mülkülü, Lower Mülkülü
