= Vardenis mountain range =

Mountain range in Armenia and Azerbaijan

The Vardenis mountain range is a mountain range in Armenia and Azerbaijan (in Republic of Artsakh before 2023). It stretches for about 60 km and blocks the Sevan Depression (that contains Lake Sevan) from the south. Its highest peak is Mount Vardenis (3,522m). A part of the Armenia–Azerbaijan border runs along the range.
