= Aşağı Gəyəli =

- Location within Azerbaijan
- Coordinates: 39°08′36″N 46°30′22″E
- Country: Azerbaijan
- Rayon: Zangilan
- Time zone: UTC+4 (AZT)
  - Summer (DST): UTC+5 (AZT)

Aşağı Gəyəli (also, Ashaghy Geyali) is a village in the Zangilan Rayon of Azerbaijan.

== See also ==
- Yuxarı Gəyəli
