= Bardzruni =

Bardzruni Բարձրունի
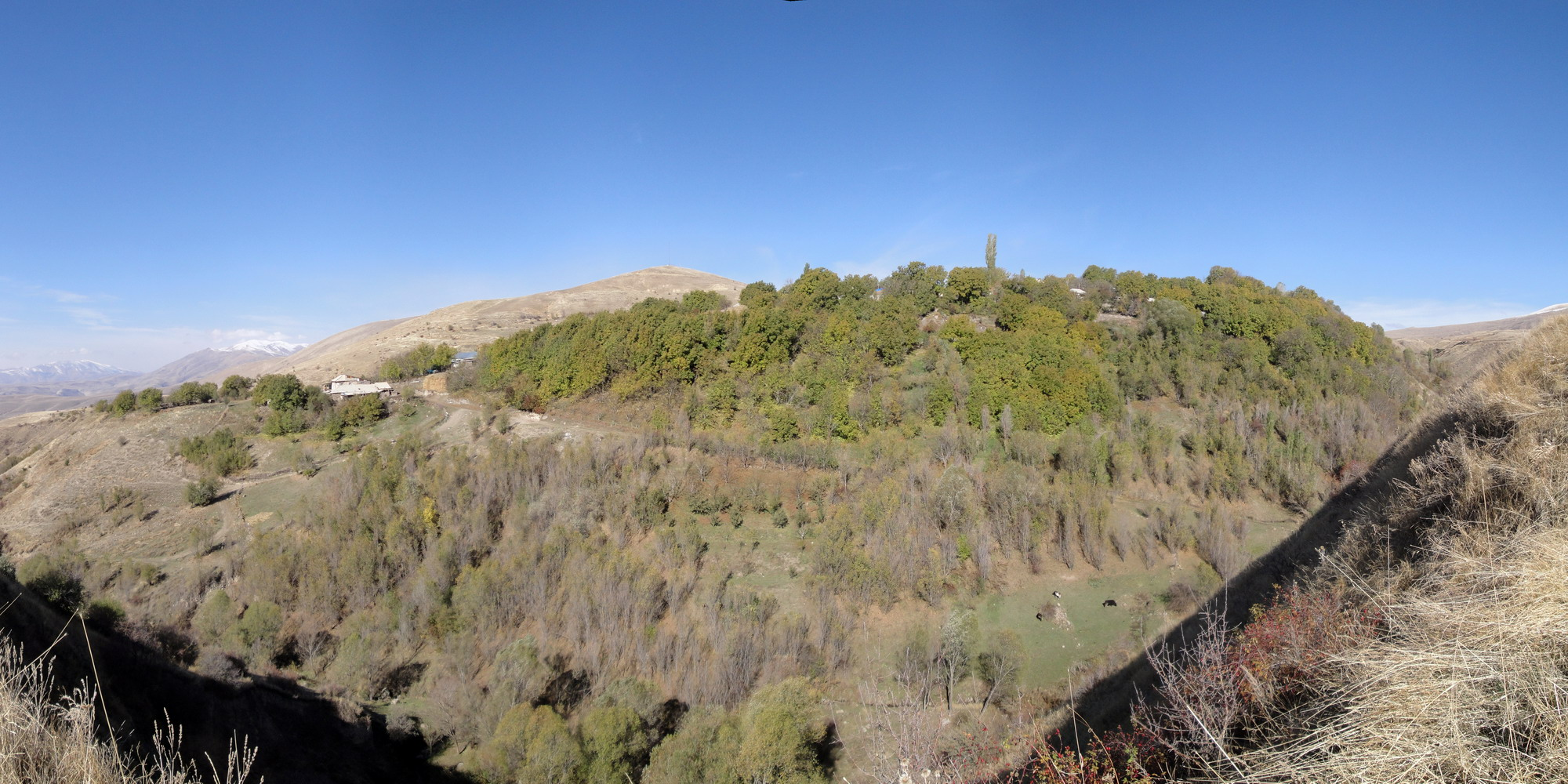

- Location within Armenia Location within Vayots Dzor
- Coordinates: 39°31′15″N 45°28′56″E
- Country: Armenia
- Province: Vayots Dzor
- Municipality: Vayk

Population (2011)
  - Total: 361
- Time zone: UTC+4 (AMT)

Bardzruni (Armenian: Բարձրունի) is a village in the Vayk Municipality of the Vayots Dzor Province of Armenia. The village is located close to the Armenia–Azerbaijan border.

== Toponymy ==
The village was previously known as Sultanbek.

== Gallery ==
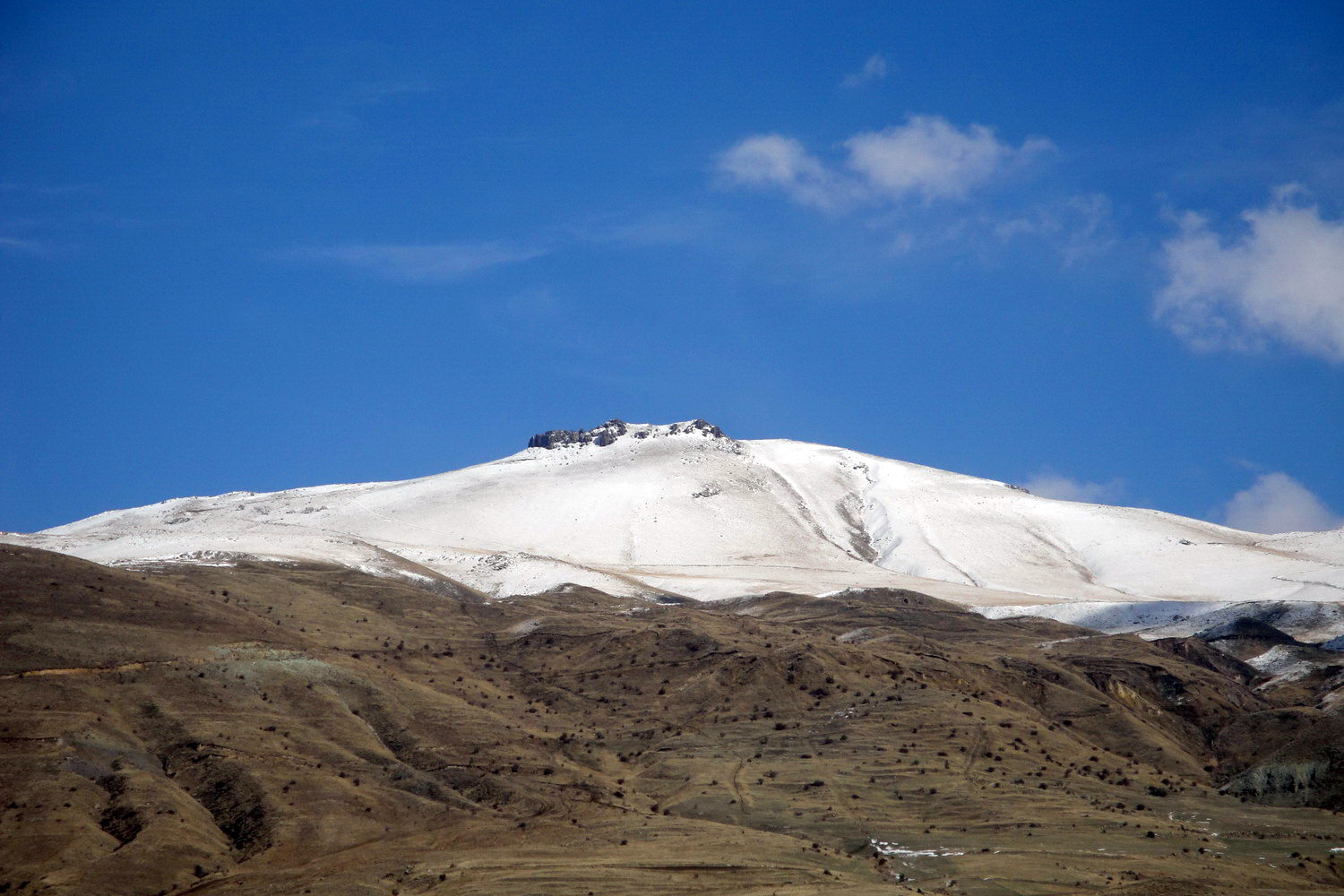
View of Mount Sangyar from Bardzruni

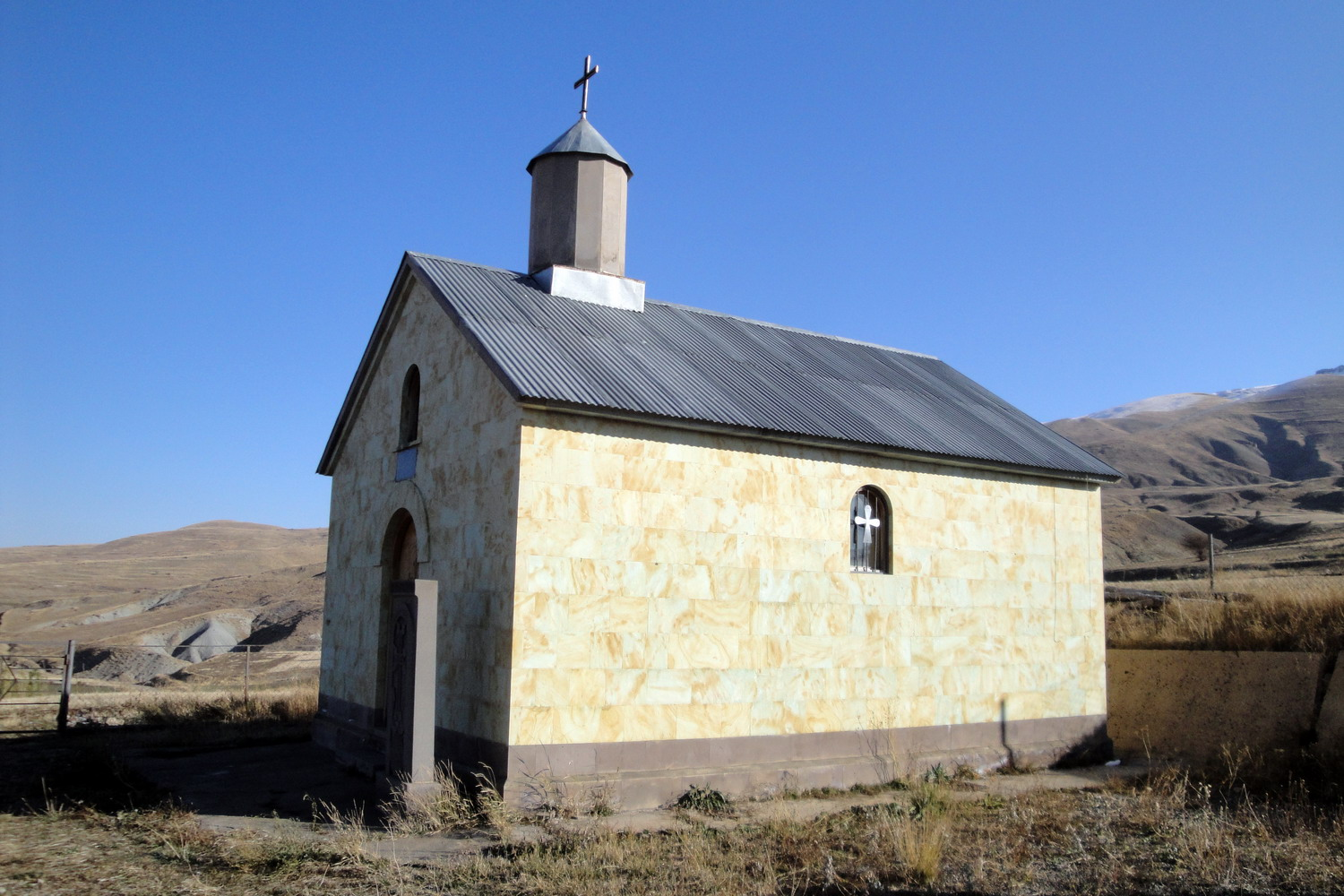
Chapel in Bardzruni

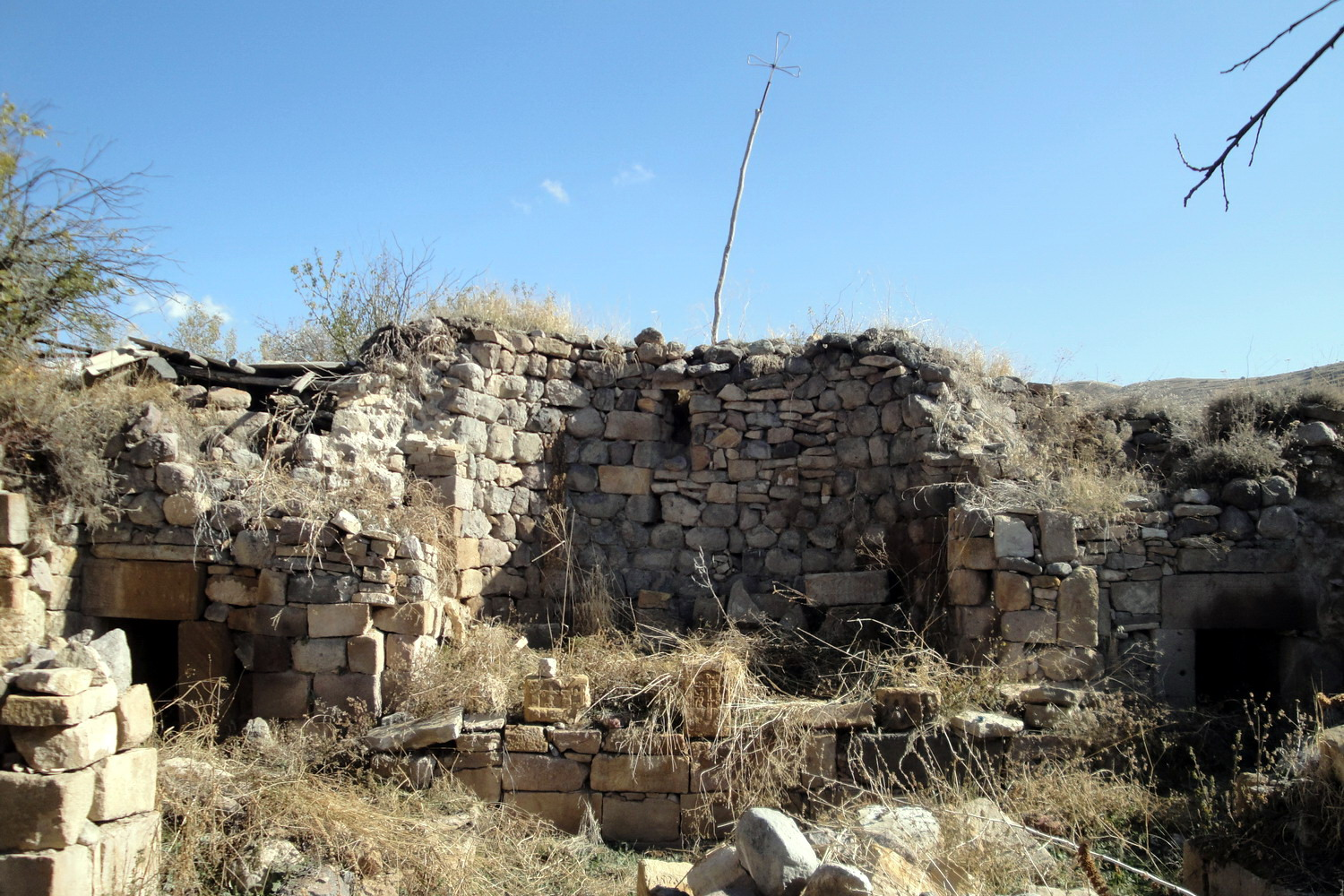
14th-15th century church

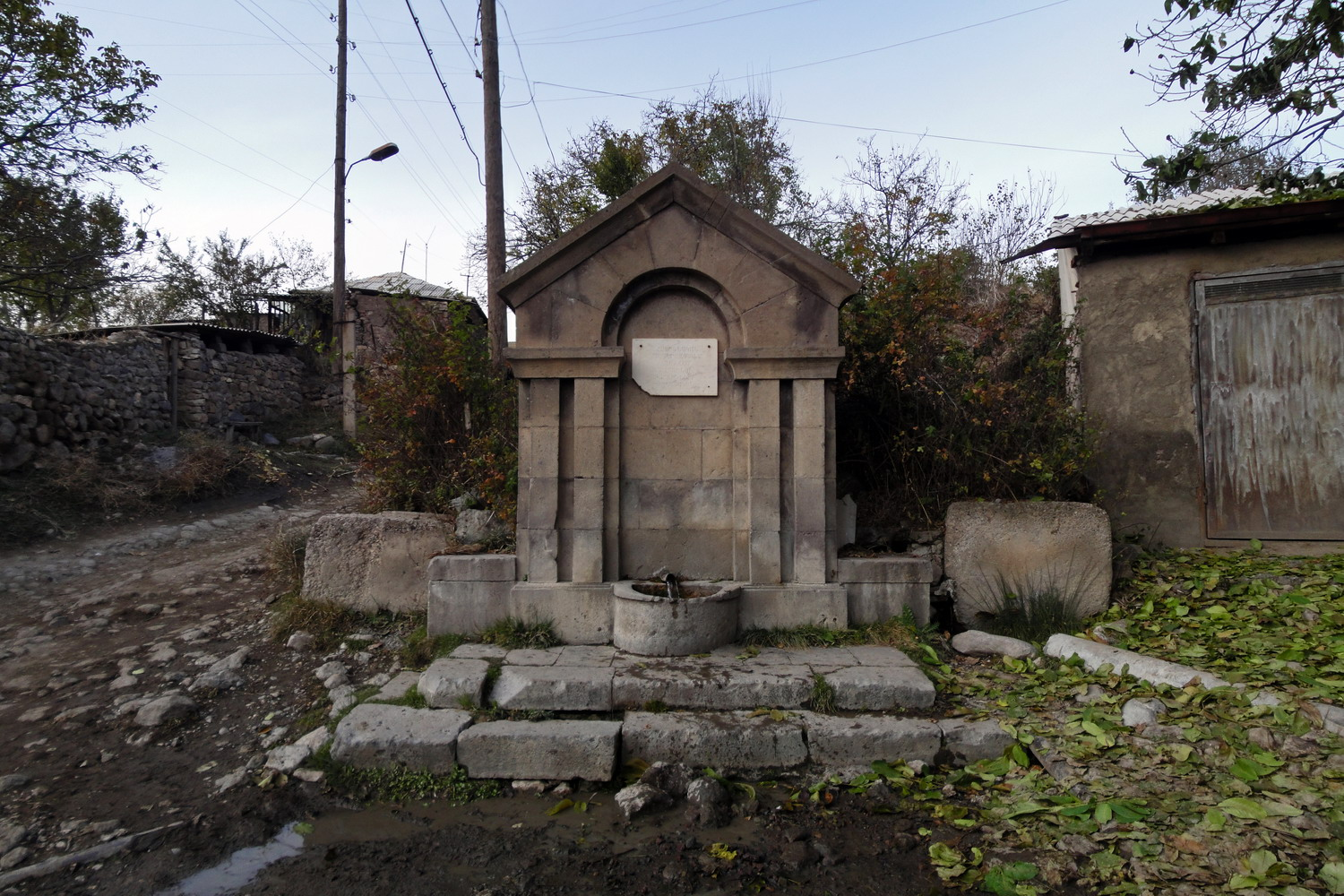
Memorial spring to the fallen in WWII

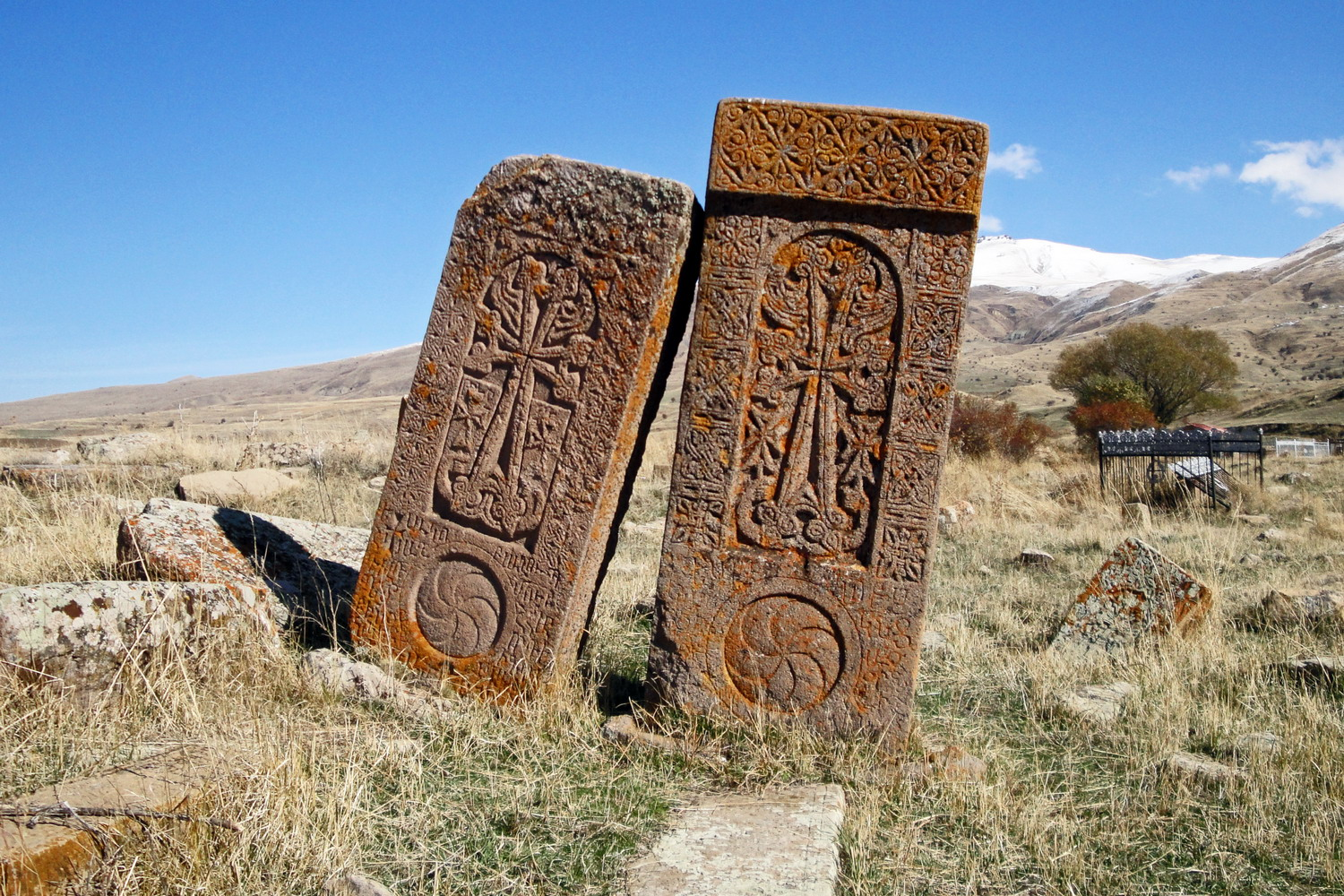
16th century Khachkars
