= Tatlı, Agstafa =

Tatlı
- Municipality
- Location within Azerbaijan
- Coordinates: 41°01′29″N 45°26′53″E
- Country: Azerbaijan
- Rayon: Agstafa

Population
  - Total: 2,765
- Time zone: UTC+4 (AZT)
  - Summer (DST): UTC+5 (AZT)

Tatlı (also, Tatlu and Tatly) is a village and municipality in the Agstafa Rayon of Azerbaijan. It has a population of 2,765. The municipality consists of the villages of Tatlı, Köhnəqışlaq, and Yaradullu.
