= Köhnəqışlaq, Agstafa =

Köhnəqışlaq
- Location within Azerbaijan
- Coordinates: 40°59′22″N 45°25′22″E
- Country: Azerbaijan
- Rayon: Agstafa
- Municipality: Tatlı
- Time zone: UTC+4 (AZT)
  - Summer (DST): UTC+5 (AZT)

Köhnəqışlaq (also, Köhnə Qışlaq and Këgnakyshlak) is a village in the Agstafa Rayon of Azerbaijan. The village forms part of the municipality of Tatlı.
