= Yeghvard, Syunik =

Yeghvard Եղվարդ
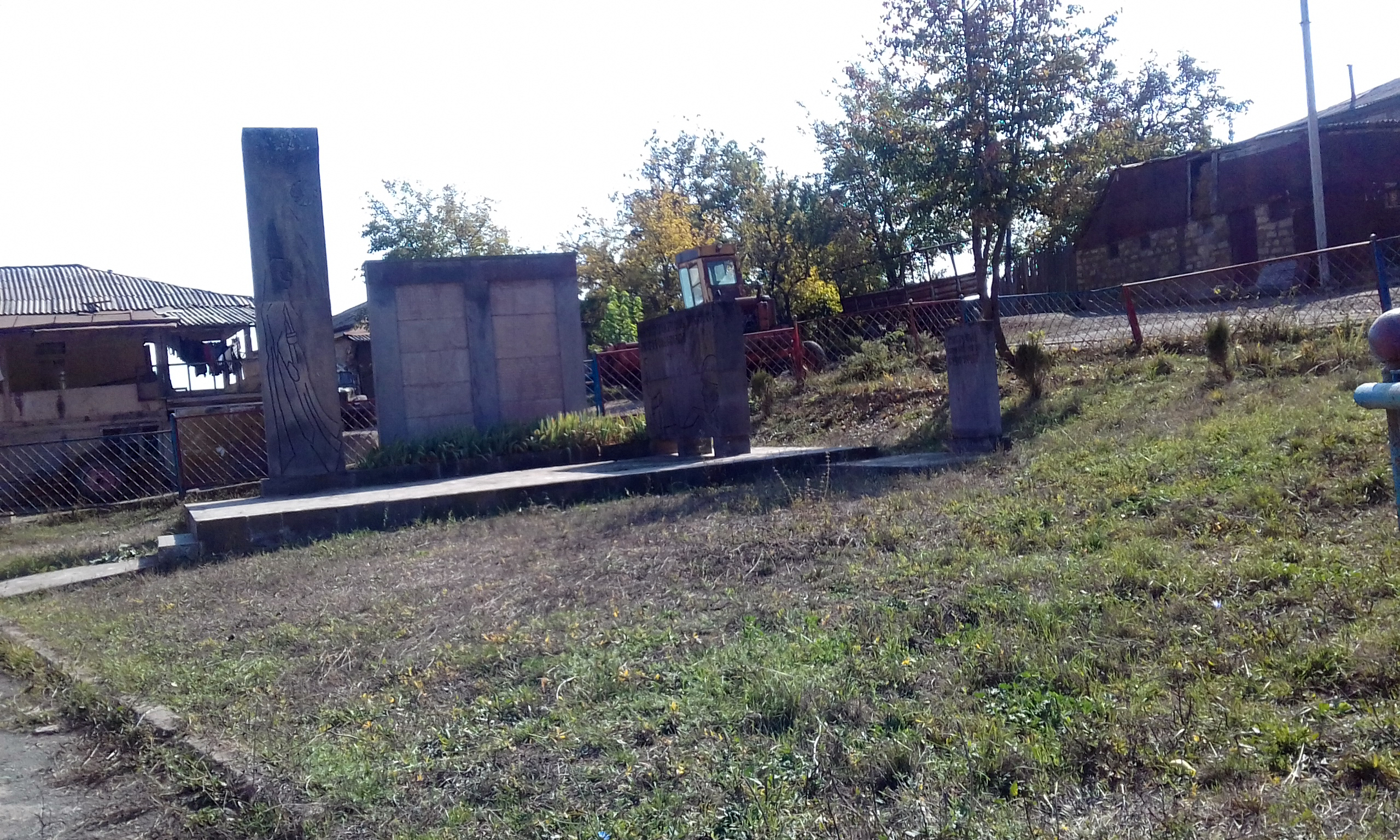
- WWII monument in Yeghvard

- Location within Armenia Location within Syunik Province
- Coordinates: 39°13′29″N 46°33′38″E
- Country: Armenia
- Province: Syunik
- Municipality: Kapan

Area
  - Total: 12.92 km^{2} (4.99 sq mi)

Population (2011)
  - Total: 273
  - Density: 21.1/km^{2} (54.7/sq mi)
- Time zone: UTC+4 (AMT)

Yeghvard (Armenian: Եղվարդ) is a village situated in the Kapan Municipality of the Syunik Province in Armenia.

== Demographics ==
The Statistical Committee of Armenia reported its population as 272 in 2010, up from 270 at the 2001 census.

== Gallery ==
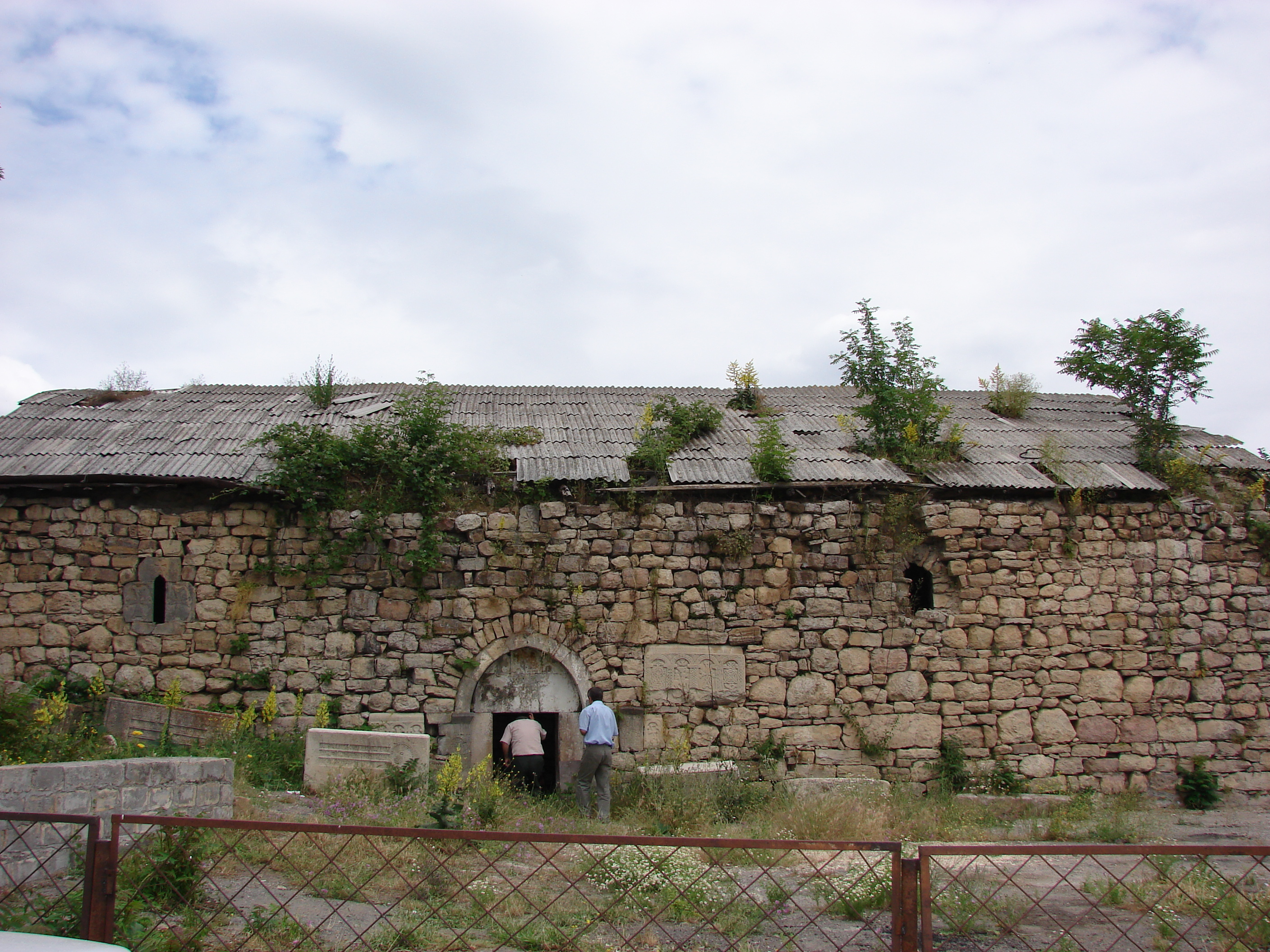
Surb Astvatsatsin Church

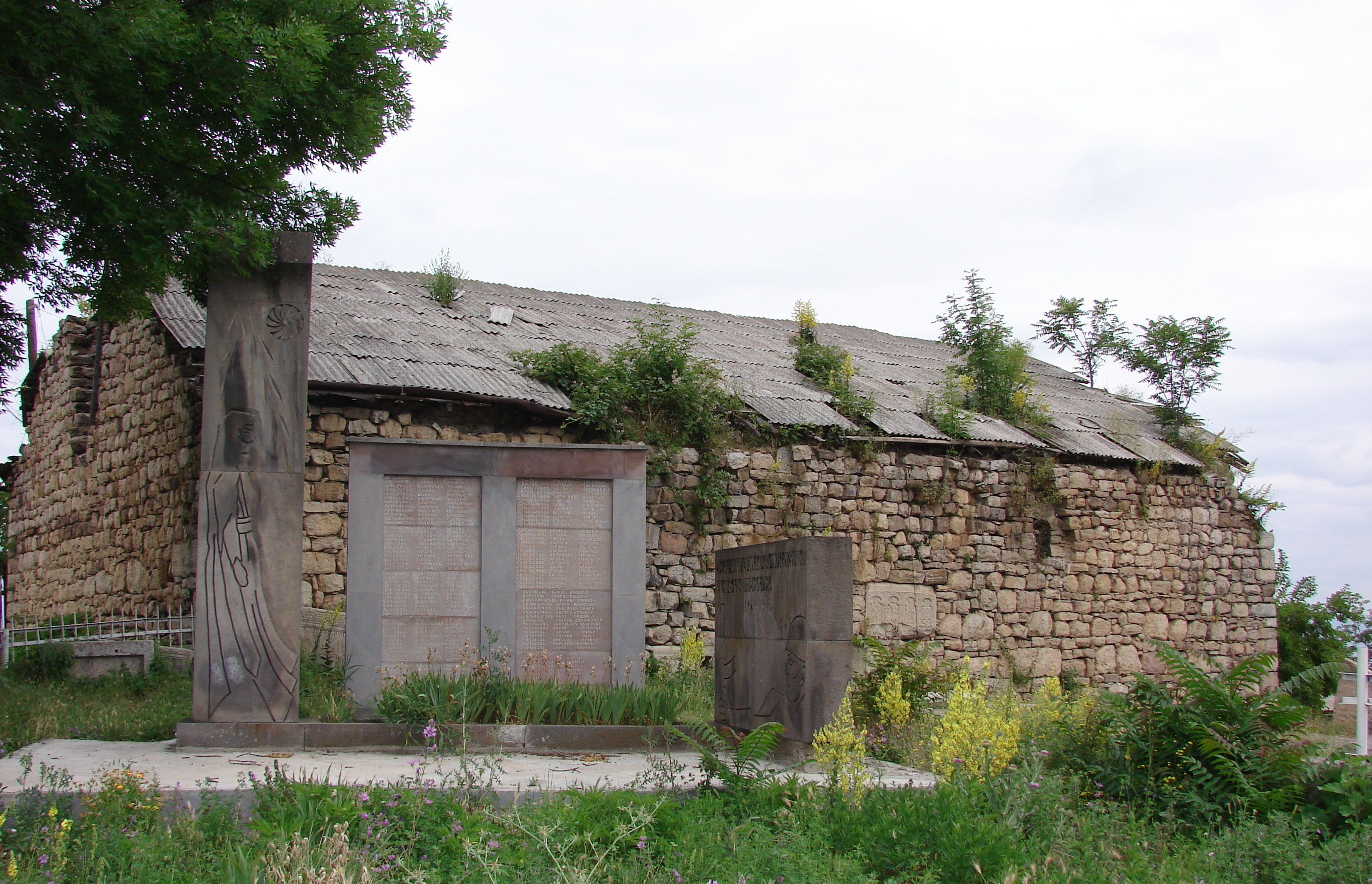
Surb Astvatsatsin Church
