= Qazançı, Zangilan =

Gazanchy
- Azerbaijani: Qazançı
- Location within Azerbaijan
- Coordinates: 39°11′10″N 46°26′04″E
- Country: Azerbaijan
- District: Zangilan
- Elevation: 1,010 m (3,310 ft)
- Time zone: UTC+4 (AZT)
  - Summer (DST): UTC+5 (AZT)

Qazançı (Gazanchy) is a village in the Zangilan District of Azerbaijan.

== History ==
From 1993 until 2020, Qazançı was under the control of the Armenian Armed Forces. During the 2020 Nagorno-Karabakh War, the village was retaken by the Azerbaijani Armed Forces.

In November 2021, Azerbaijan established a new post in the village of Qazançı on the border with Armenia.
