= Yaradullu =

- Location within Azerbaijan
- Coordinates: 41°01′N 45°26′E
- Country: Azerbaijan
- Rayon: Agstafa
- Municipality: Tatlı
- Elevation: 587 m (1,926 ft)

Population (2009)
  - Total: 420
- Time zone: UTC+4 (AZT)
  - Summer (DST): UTC+5 (AZT)

Yaradullu is a village in the Agstafa Rayon of Azerbaijan. The village forms part of the municipality of Tatlı.
