= Barekamavan =

Barekamavan Բարեկամավան
- Location within Armenia Location within Tavush
- Coordinates: 41°10′45″N 45°06′35″E
- Country: Armenia
- Province: Tavush
- Municipality: Noyemberyan

Population (2011)
  - Total: 345
- Time zone: UTC+4 (AMT)

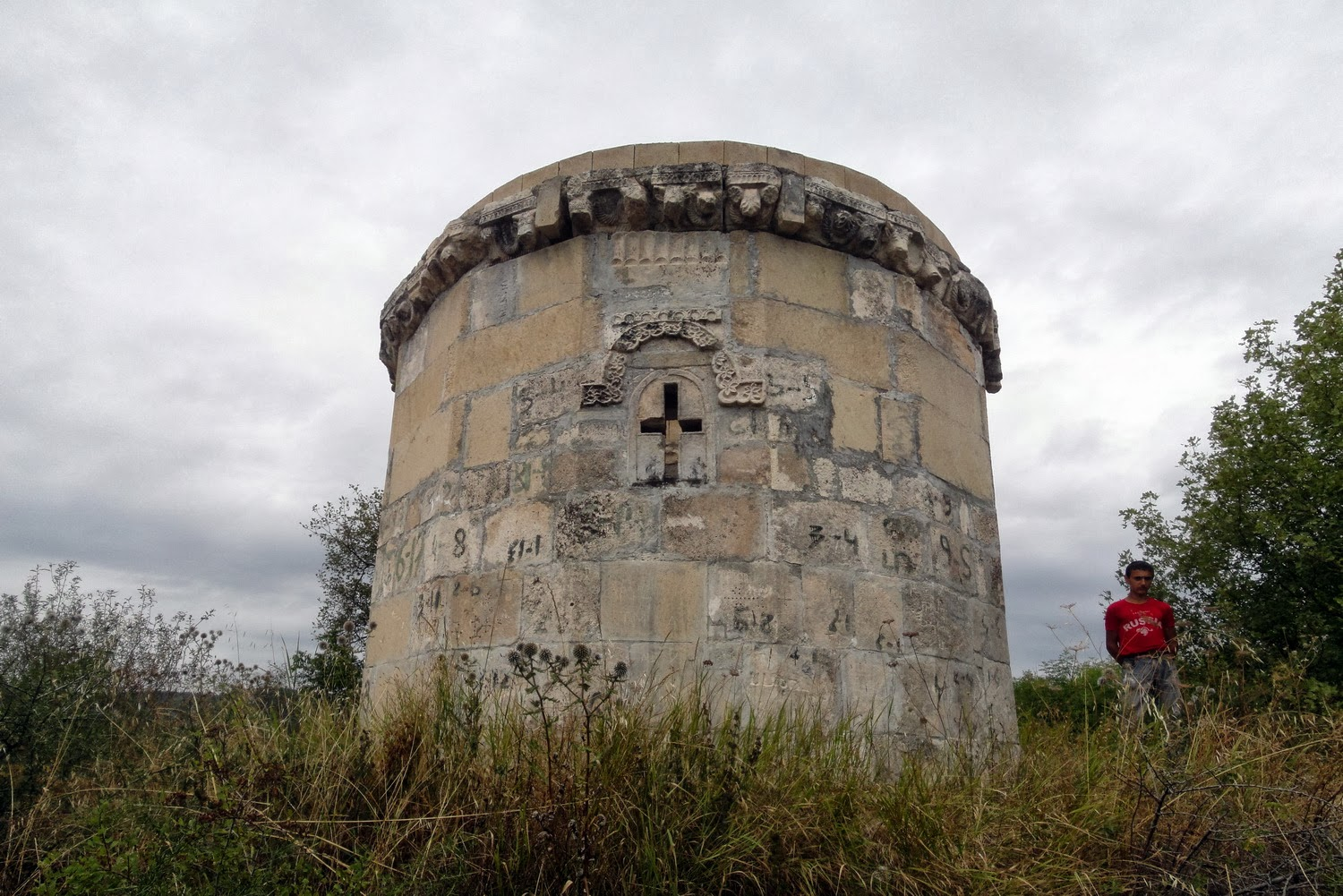
Armenian Christianezed pagan Mausoleum in Barekamavan, Tavush Province

Barekamavan (Armenian: Բարեկամավան) is a village in the Noyemberyan Municipality of the Tavush Province of Armenia.

== Toponymy ==
The village was previously known as Kurumsulu and Dostlu. The inhabitants of Barekamavan have always been exclusively Armenians.
