= Gərməçataq =

- Municipality
- Location within Azerbaijan
- Coordinates: 39°29′29″N 45°25′59″E
- Country: Azerbaijan
- Autonomous republic: Nakhchivan
- District: Babek

Population (2005)
  - Total: 507
- Time zone: UTC+4 (AZT)

Gərməçataq (also, Kərməçatax, Germachatakh, Girmechatakh, and Kyarmachatakh) is a village and municipality in the Babek District of Nakhchivan, Azerbaijan. It is located 41 km in the north from the district center, on the average mountainous area. Its population is busy with gardening, beekeeping and animal husbandry. There are secondary school, club and a medical center in the village. It has a population of 507.

== Etymology ==
The name of the village is associated with Gərməçatax (Garmachatakh) River which is flowing from this area. The original version is Girməcatax. It is the left tributary of the Jahrychay River. Hydronym was made with components of Girmə (the crossing location of the river) and catax (two-headed, double, adjacent to each other) and means "the river adjacent in the crossing place".
