= Havuş =

- Municipality
- Location within Azerbaijan
- Coordinates: 39°36′06″N 45°14′34″E
- Country: Azerbaijan
- Autonomous republic: Nakhchivan
- District: Sharur

Population (2005)
  - Total: 114
- Time zone: UTC+4 (AZT)

Havuş (formerly known as Havus) is a village and municipality in the Sharur District of the Nakhchivan Autonomous Republic enclave in Azerbaijan. It is located 35 kilometers west of the district center on the slope of the Daralayaz ridge, which forms the border with Armenia. Havuş is about 2,000 meters above sea level. There is a secondary school, club, and a medical centre in the village. As of 2005, Havuş had a population of 114. The settlement ofTamaşalı and a cemetery dating back to the Middle Ages are located within its territory.

== Etymology ==
According to some researchers, havuş is a distorted form of the word ağuş. In Persian, the word ağuş means "embrace with open arms." The village derives its name from its location, since it is situated at the foot of Mount Avuş. There is also a spring of the same name located nearby.

Avuş Spring - According to information from local people, the name of the spring is from the word ovuc (the handful). It is called this due to the shape of the spring being similar to the handful. In some Turkic languages, avuş/avuj means "vaccine, alum". This shows the existence of alum salts in the content of the spring water.

== History ==
According to official information dated on January 1, 1914, mostly ethnic Tatars (Tatars in Azerbaijan), consisting of a total of 346 people in both sexes lived in the Havuş (Russian: Авуши) village of Sharur-Daralayaz uyezd of Erivan Governorate.

In May 1992, a part of the population of the village was mandated to move to the other villages due to armed aggression by Armenia.

== Historical and archaeological monuments ==
=== Havuş Maiden's Tower ===
Havuş Maiden's Tower is the monument on the steep rocks east of the village in the Sharur region. The inside of the rock consists of the ending of the shaped crown. It is also called the "Maiden House" and "Maiden Tower". It is commonly said that the monument was built in the Middle Ages.

=== Havuş Necropolis ===
Havuş Necropolis is an ancient cemetery on the mountain slope near Havuş village. As a result of exploration, researchers collected samples of material culture, especially pottery fragments. According to the Azerbaijan National Academy of Sciences, the Havuş Necropolis dates from between the 2nd and 4th century CE.

=== Havush Sanctuary ===
Havush Sanctuary is a cave among the steep rocks northeast of the village. Its depth is more than 15 meters and it is 3 to 4 meters wide. The entrance was carved in the shape of a crown. There are images of several fighters holding spears, which were engraved with a method of scratching and digging at the inside of the cave. After an area of 1х1 m was cleaned out, human skeletons were found at a depth of 40 cm, and a sharp, black arm fracture was found at a depth of 1 m in the cave. The cave is thought to be an ancient human habitation, which later was converted to a sacred place based on the belief in their ancestors and their spirits.
