= Şahbulaq, Sharur =

Şahbulaq
- Municipality
- Location within Azerbaijan
- Coordinates: 39°39′11″N 45°08′46″E
- Country: Azerbaijan
- Autonomous republic: Nakhchivan
- District: Sharur

Population (2005)
  - Total: 564
- Time zone: UTC+4 (AZT)

Şahbulaq (until 2003, Cağazur, Jaghazur, Dzhaghazur, and Dzhagazir) is a village and municipality in the Sharur District of Nakhchivan, Azerbaijan. It is located 22 km away from the district center. The village is surrounded by mountains on all sides which form the border with Armenia. Its population mainly is busy with gardening and animal husbandry. Since 1988 the Şahbulaq village were subjected to incessant armed attacks by the Armenians, however all such attacks were prevented by a self-defence group. The new school has been built and the water pipeline was laid in the Şahbulaq village. There is also a library, club and a medical centre in the village. It has a population of 564.

== Etymology ==
Its previous name was Cağazir (Jaghazir). The name was made out from the components of the Cağa (small) and zir (height) means "small hill, small height". The name reflects the geographical position of the area. Since 2003, it was officially registered as Şahbulaq (Shahbulag). The current name of the village is related with the same named spring in the area.
