= Aşağı Mülkülü =

- Municipality
- Location within Azerbaijan
- Coordinates: 41°02′47″N 45°37′18″E
- Country: Azerbaijan
- Rayon: Tovuz

Population
  - Total: 2,218
- Time zone: UTC+4 (AZT)
  - Summer (DST): UTC+5 (AZT)

Aşağı Mülkülü (also, Alagel-Myulkyulyu, Ashaga-Myul’kyuli, Ashagy Myul’kyulyu, Mülkülü, and Myulkyulyu) is a village and municipality in the Tovuz Rayon of Azerbaijan. It has a population of 2,218.
