= Berkaber =

Berkaber Բերքաբեր
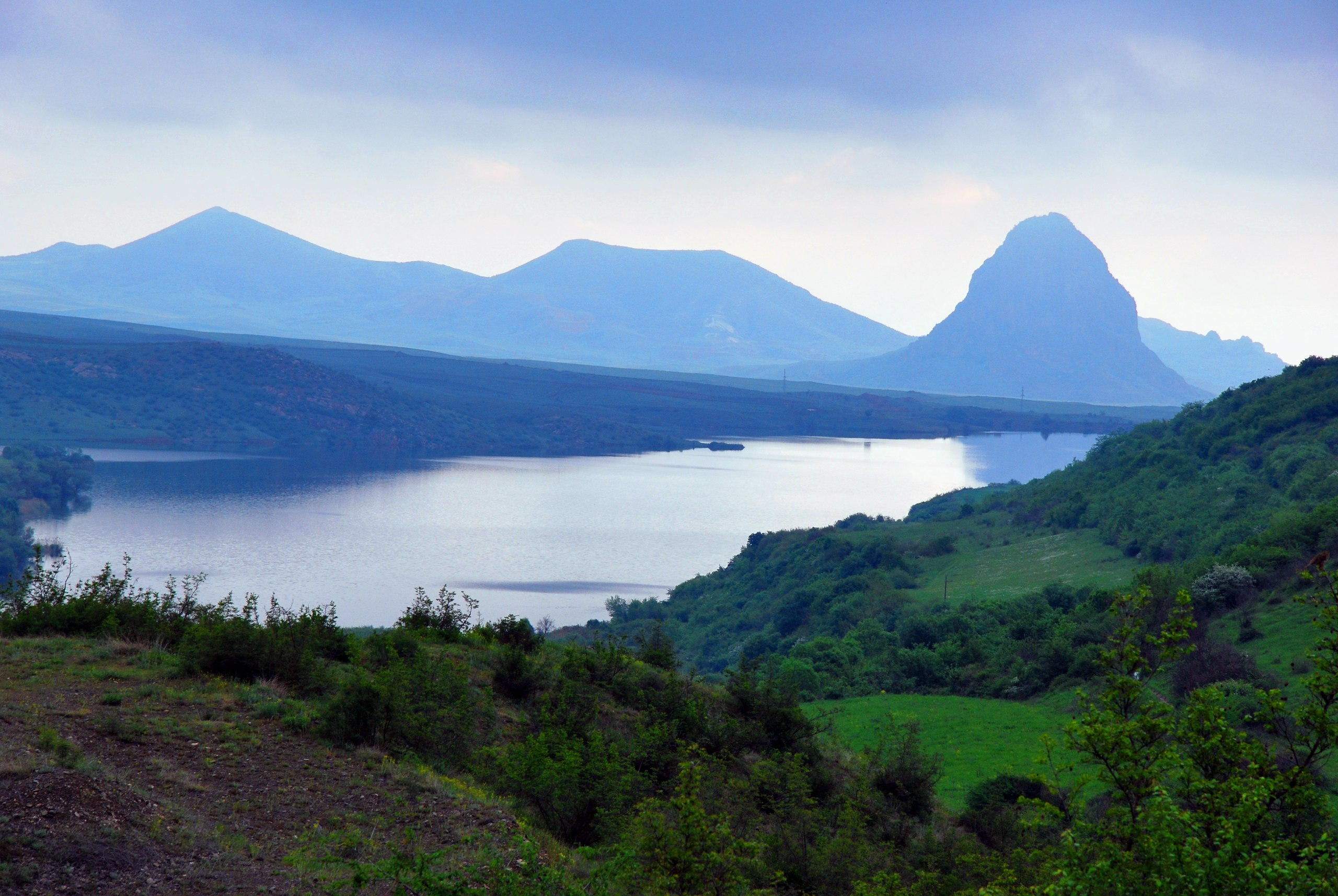
- Berkaber reservoir

- Location within Armenia Location within Tavush
- Coordinates: 41°04′N 45°09′E
- Country: Armenia
- Province: Tavush
- Municipality: Ijevan
- Elevation: 700 m (2,300 ft)

Population (2011)
  - Total: 465
- Time zone: UTC+4 (AMT)

Berkaber (Armenian: Բերքաբեր) is a village in the Ijevan Municipality of the Tavush Province of Armenia.

== Toponymy ==
The village was previously known as Dzhogaz, Joghaz and Pipis.

== Gallery ==
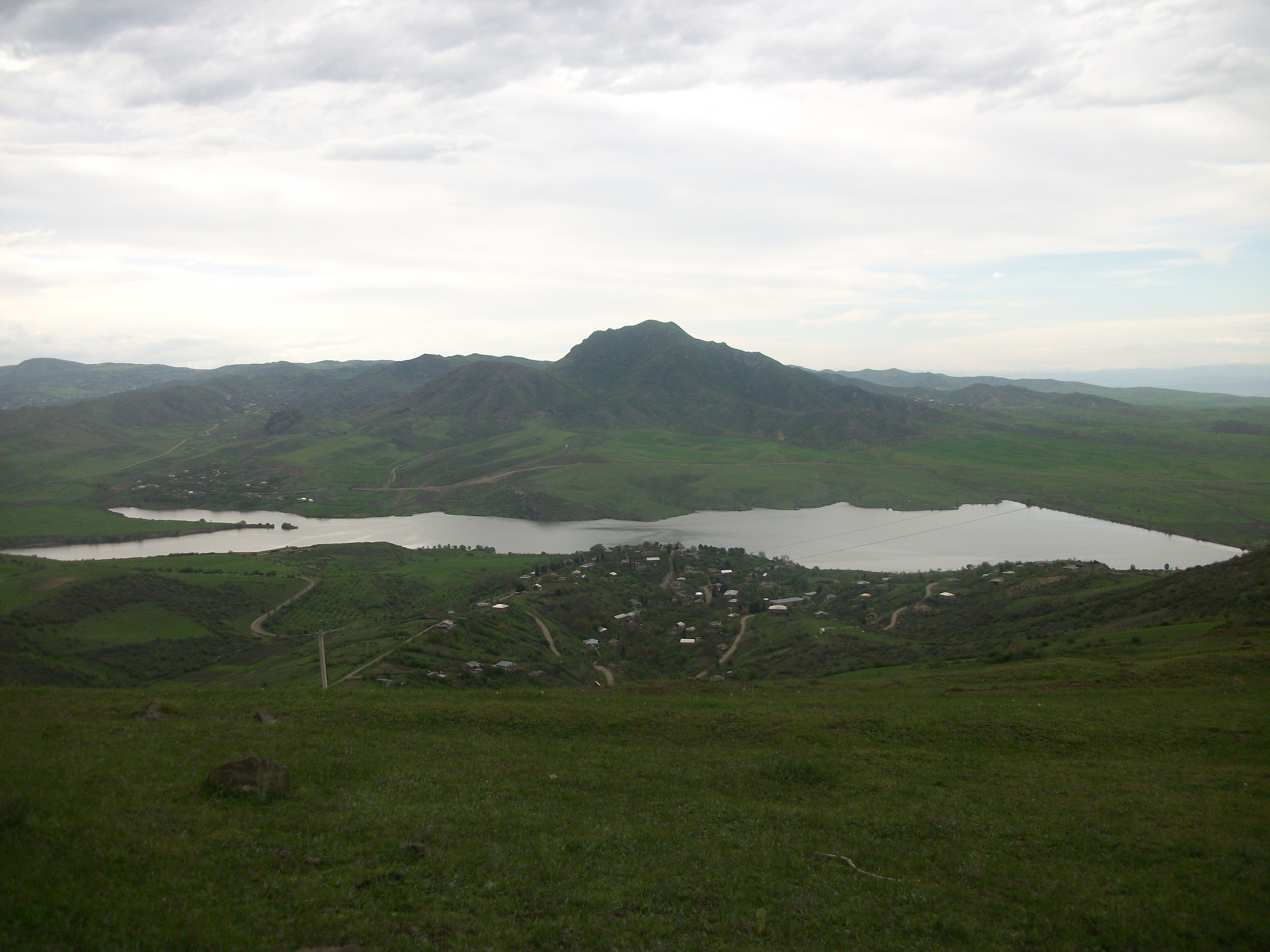
A view of Berkaber and Berkaber reservoir

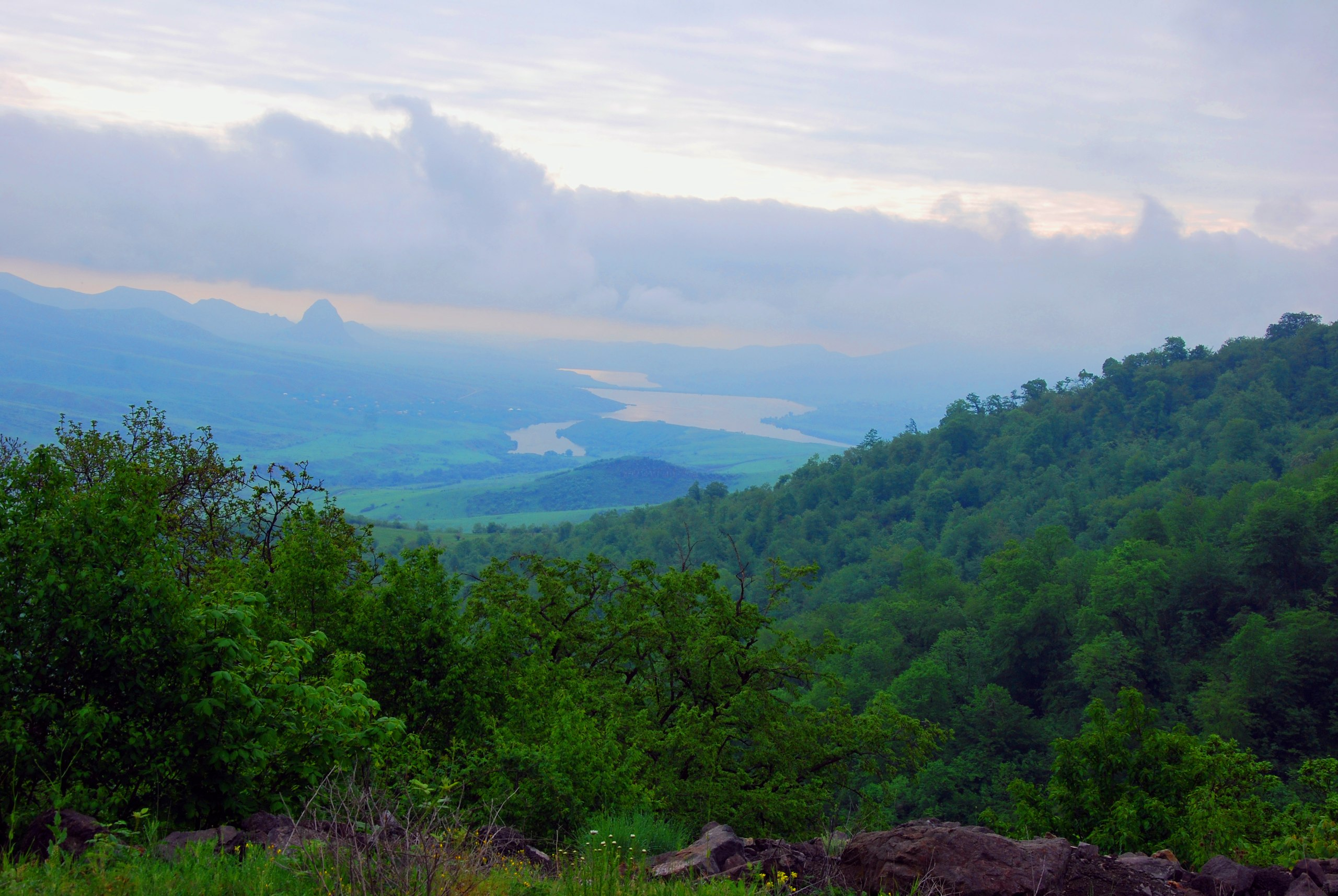
Scenery around Berkaber

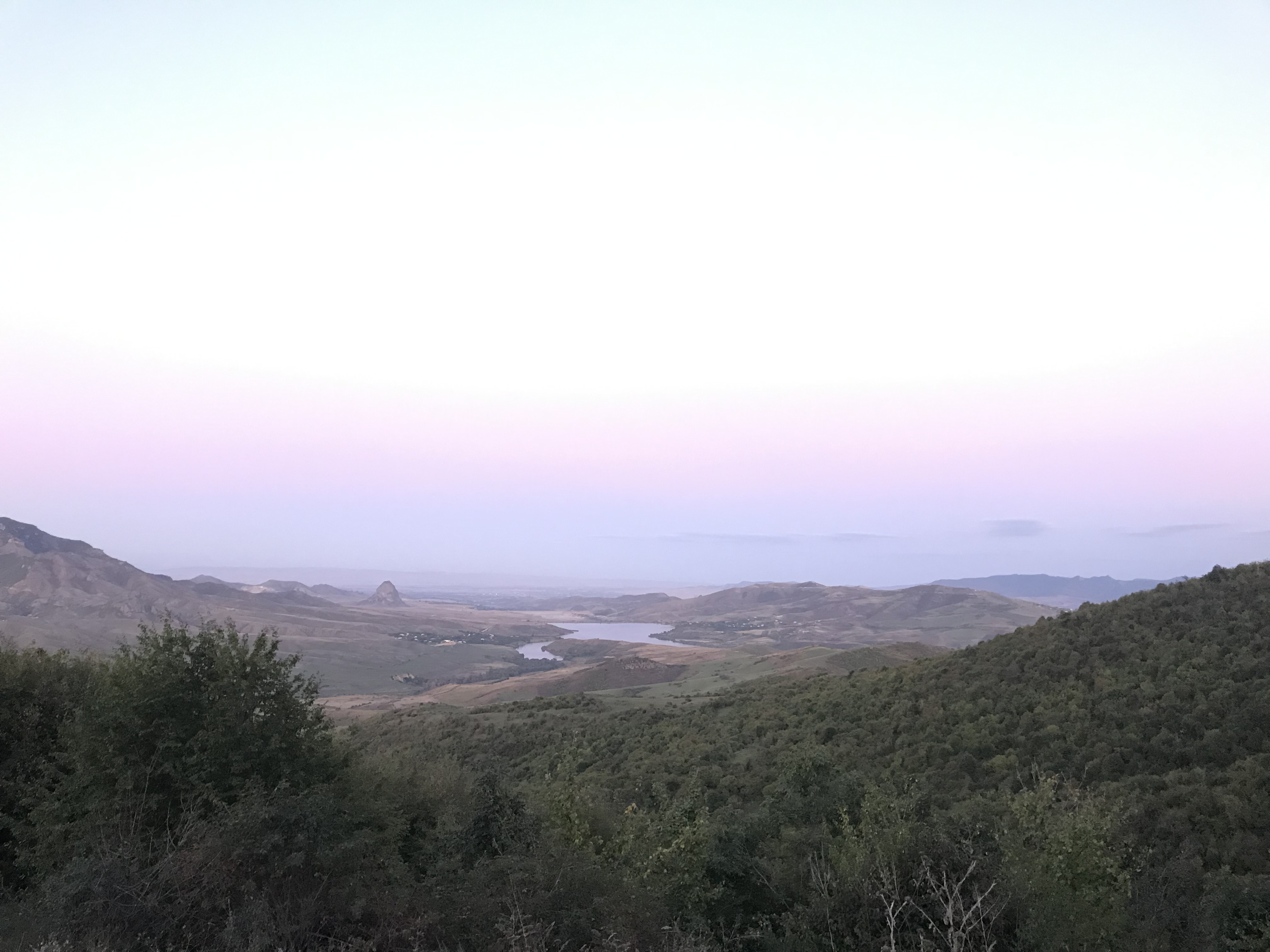
Berkaber reservoir
