= Boyuk Alagol =

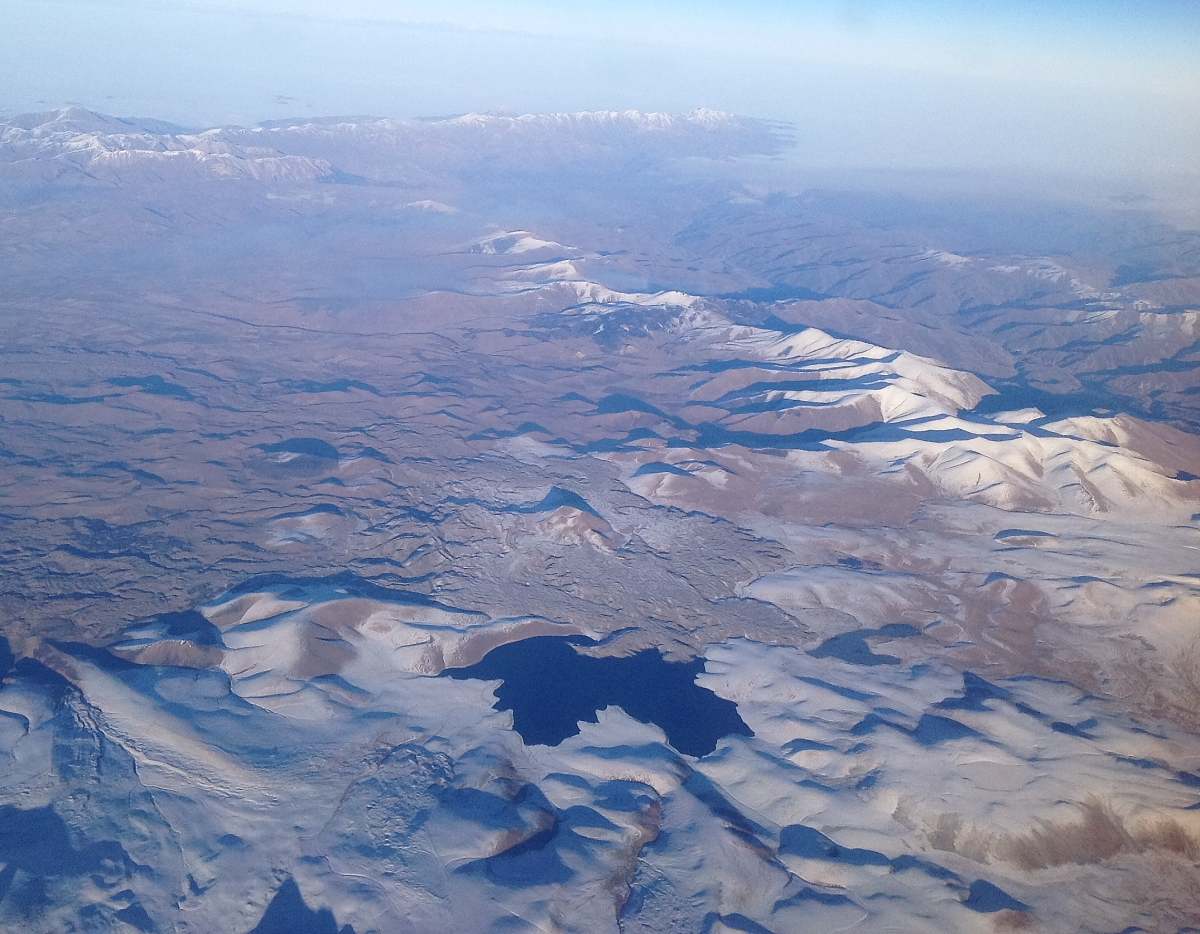
- Satellite view of the lake

- Location within Azerbaijan
- Interactive map of Boyuk Alagol
- Location: Kalbajar District, Azerbaijan
- Coordinates: 40°00′N 45°42′E
- Type: Crater lake
- Basin countries: Azerbaijan
- Surface area: 5.1 km^{2} (2.0 sq mi)
- Water volume: 24,300,000 m^{3} (19,700 acre⋅ft)

Boyuk Alagol (Azerbaijani: Böyük Alagöl) is a lake in the Kalbajar District of Azerbaijan. It is located on the Karabakh volcanic plateau. Its area is 5.1 square kilometres (2.0 sq mi) and the volume of water reaches 24,300,000 m^{3} (860,000,000 cu ft). The Boyuk Alagol is located at an altitude of 2729 meters above sea level. The surface of the lake is covered with ice up to one meter thick from early November to late April. The water temperature is 14–15 degrees from June to August.

The lake was occupied by Armenian forces following the First Nagorno-Karabakh war and was administrated as part of the Shahumyan Province of the self-proclaimed Republic of Artsakh. The Kalbajar District, along with the lake, were returned to Azerbaijan on 25 November 2020 per the 2020 Nagorno-Karabakh ceasefire agreement.

In 2026, a concept was published proposing the use of the Alagöl lake system as the upper reservoir of a large pumped-storage hydroelectric complex.

== Gallery ==
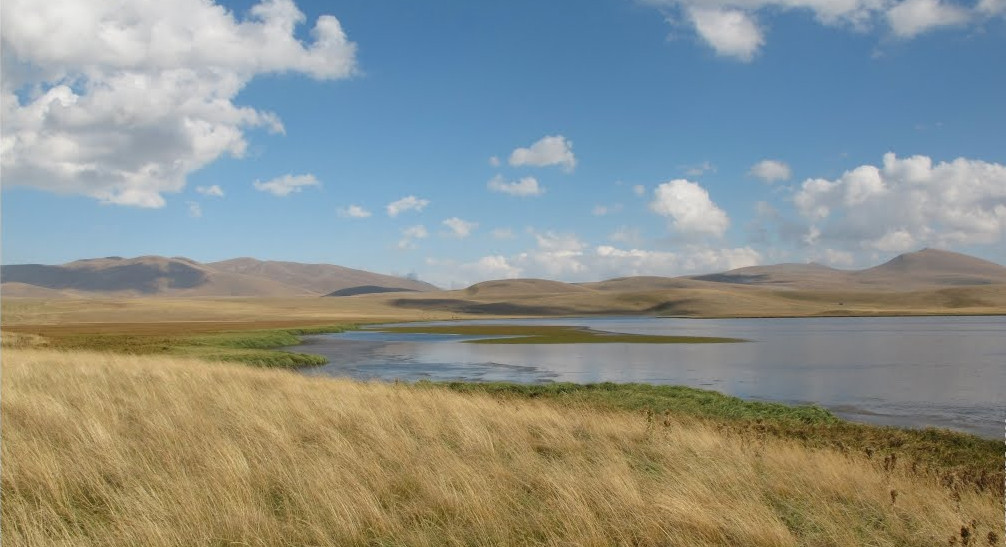

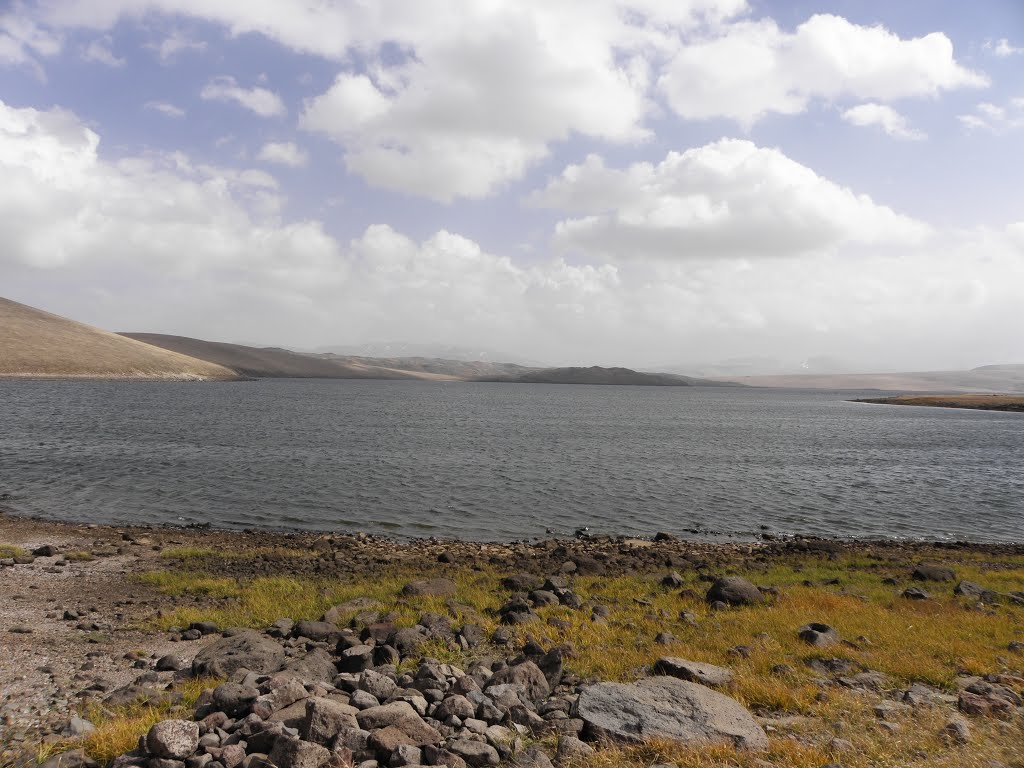

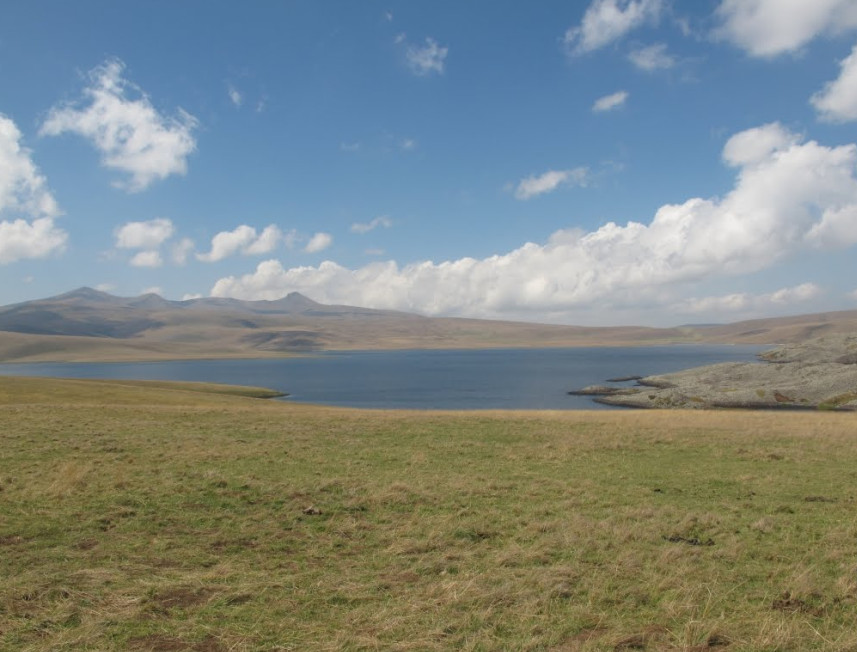
