= Kaghnut =

Kaghnut Կաղնուտ
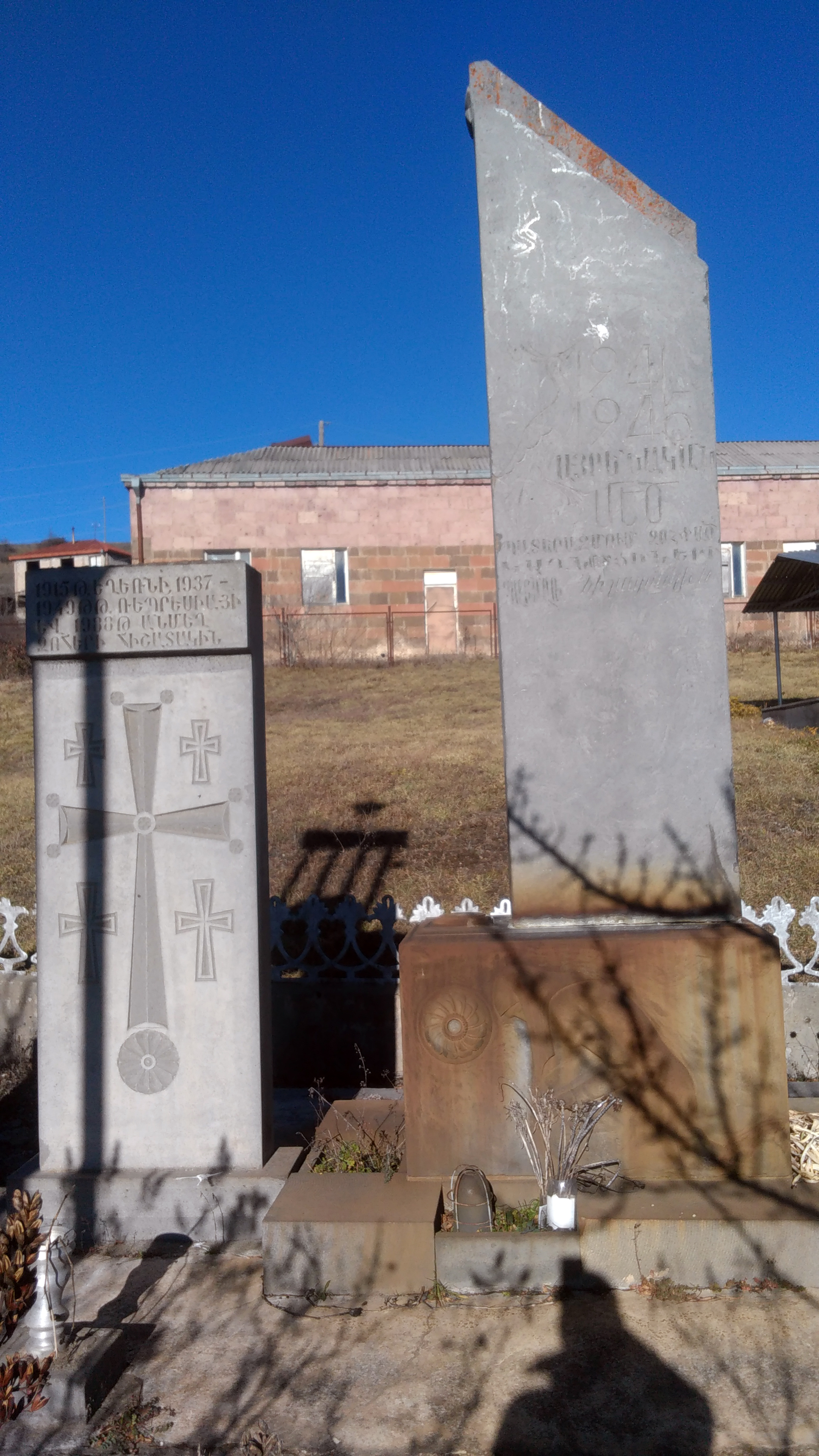
- WWII monument in Kaghnut

- Location within Armenia Location within Syunik Province
- Coordinates: 39°16′27″N 46°30′23″E
- Country: Armenia
- Province: Syunik
- Municipality: Kapan

Area
  - Total: 5.84 km^{2} (2.25 sq mi)

Population (2011)
  - Total: 105
  - Density: 18.0/km^{2} (46.6/sq mi)
- Time zone: UTC+4 (AMT)

Kaghnut (Armenian: Կաղնուտ) is a village in the Kapan Municipality of the Syunik Province in Armenia.

== Etymology ==
The village was previously known as Moghes.

== Demographics ==
The Statistical Committee of Armenia reported its population as 117 at the 2001 census, 109 in 2010, and 105 in 2011.
