= Fəxralı =

- Municipality
- Location within Azerbaijan
- Coordinates: 40°44′52″N 46°33′29″E
- Country: Azerbaijan
- Rayon: Goranboy

Population
  - Total: 2,600
- Time zone: UTC+4 (AZT)
  - Summer (DST): UTC+5 (AZT)

Fəxralı (also, Fakhraly) is a village and municipality in the Goranboy Rayon of Azerbaijan. It has a population of 2,710 2009 year).
