= Paruyr Sevak, Armenia =

Village in Ararat, Armenia

Paruyr Sevak Պարույր Սևակ
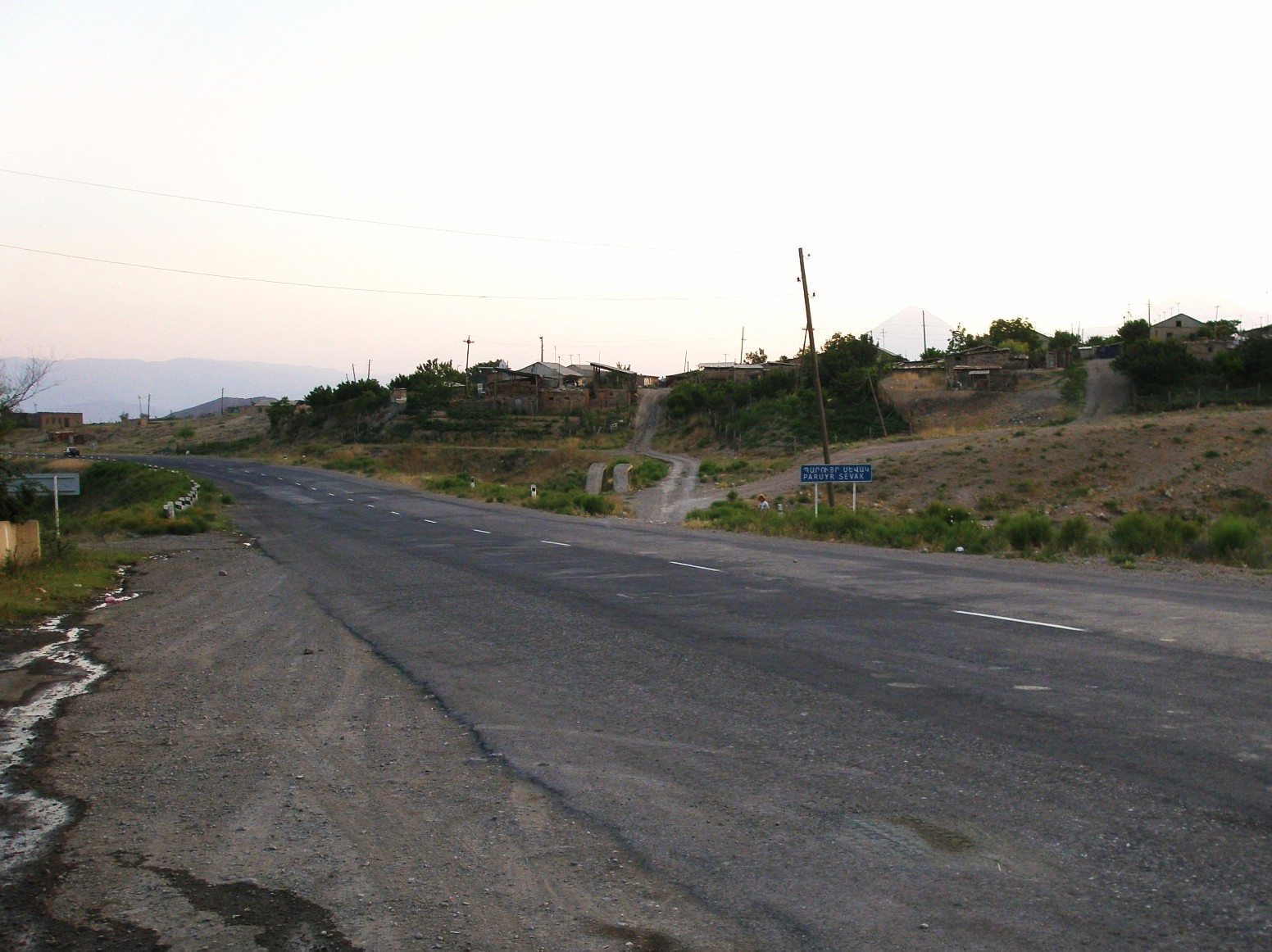
- The road leading to Paruyr Sevak.

- Location within Armenia Location within Ararat
- Coordinates: 39°46′N 44°56′E
- Country: Armenia
- Province: Ararat
- Municipality: Ararat
- Founded: 1978

Population (2011)
  - Total: 398
- Time zone: UTC+4
  - Summer (DST): UTC+5

Paruyr Sevak (Armenian: Պարույր Սևակ) is a village in the Ararat Municipality of the Ararat Province of Armenia. The village was founded in 1978 and is named in honour of the poet Paruyr Sevak.
