= Kəmərli =

- Municipality
- Location within Azerbaijan
- Coordinates: 41°12′26″N 45°04′40″E
- Country: Azerbaijan
- Rayon: Qazakh

Population
  - Total: 2,862
- Time zone: UTC+4 (AZT)
  - Summer (DST): UTC+5 (AZT)

Kəmərli (also, Kemerli, Kyamarli, and Kyamerli) is a village and municipality in the Qazakh Rayon of Azerbaijan, near the border of Armenia. It has a population of 2,862.

== Notable natives ==
- Rafig Alijanov — National Hero of Azerbaijan.
