= Rəzdərə =

- Location within Azerbaijan
- Coordinates: 39°04′05.2″N 46°33′49.1″E
- Country: Azerbaijan
- District: Zangilan

Population (2005)
  - Total: 4
- Time zone: UTC+4 (AZT)

Rəzdərə (Razdara) is a village in the Zangilan District of Azerbaijan.

== History ==
The village was located in the Armenian-occupied territories surrounding Nagorno-Karabakh, coming under the control of ethnic Armenian forces during the First Nagorno-Karabakh War in October 1993. The village subsequently became part of the breakaway Republic of Artsakh as part of its Kashatagh Province and was renamed Artsakhamayr (Armenian: Արցախամայր). It was recaptured by Azerbaijan on 4 November 2020 during the 2020 Nagorno-Karabakh war.
