= Vazashen =

Vazashen Վազաշեն
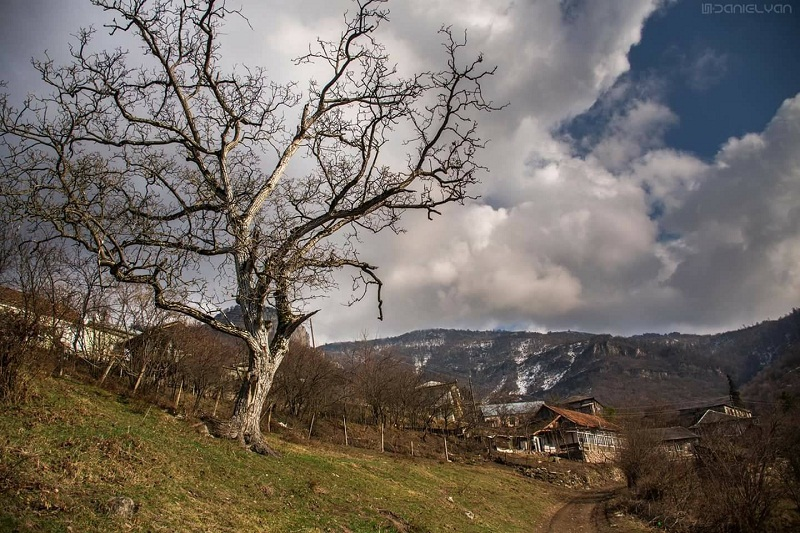
- A view of Vazashen

- Location within Armenia Location within Tavush
- Coordinates: 40°59′32″N 45°17′03″E
- Country: Armenia
- Province: Tavush
- Municipality: Ijevan

Population (2011)
  - Total: 765
- Time zone: UTC+4 (AMT)

Vazashen (Armenian: Վազաշեն) is a village in the Ijevan Municipality of the Tavush Province of Armenia.

== Toponymy ==
The village was previously known as Lala Gegh (Armenian: Լալա գեղ), then Lali Gyugh (Armenian: Լալի գյուղ). The name of Vazashen was chosen to reflect the local vineyard production (վազ/vaz 'grapevine' and շեն/shen 'village').

== History ==
Near Vazashen is the historical site of Khaghkhagh (Armenian: Խաղխաղ), the winter residence of the kings of Ancient Armenia, where Saint Vardan won his first military victory.

== Gallery ==
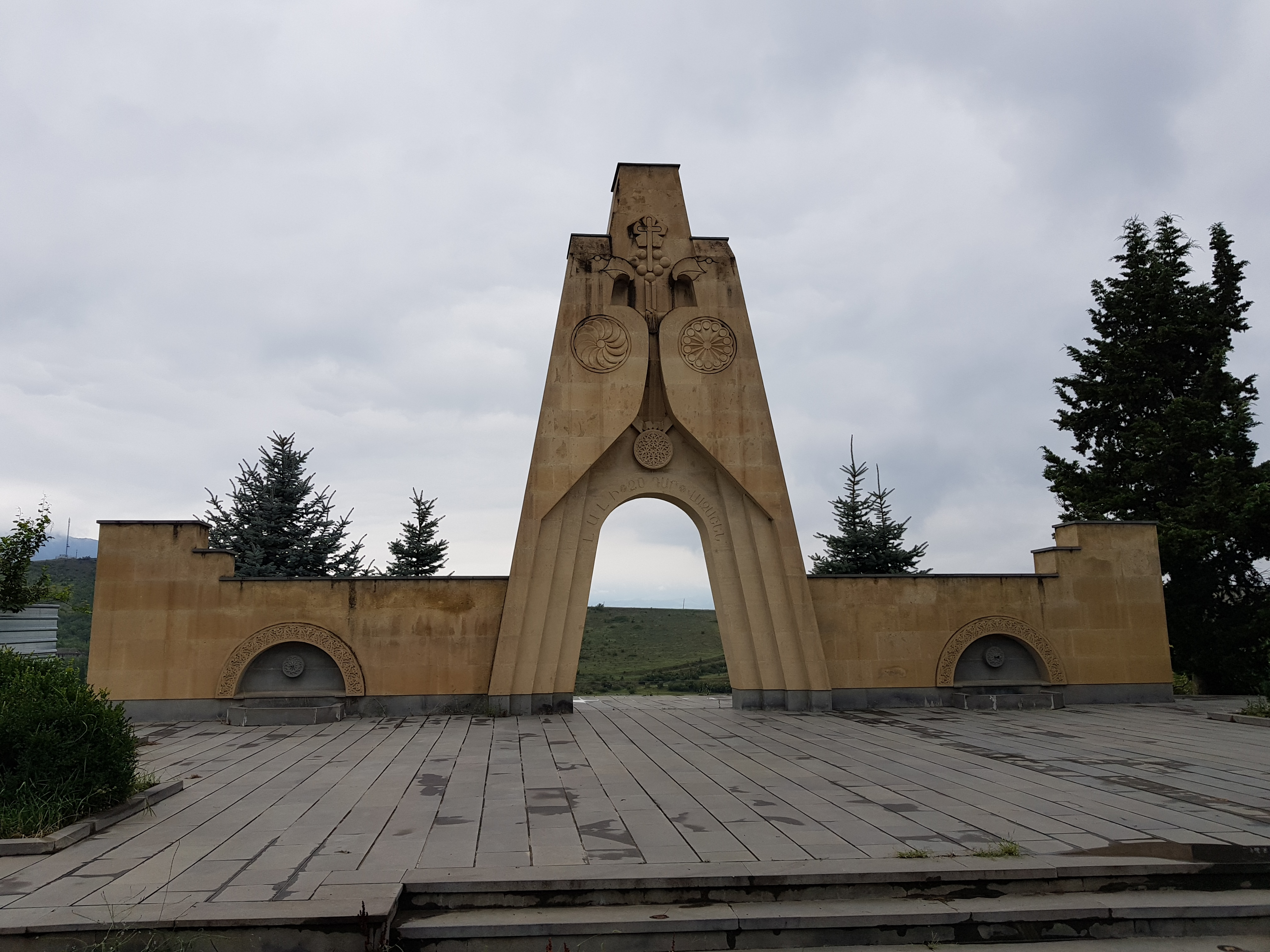
Monument in Vazashen
