= Aşağı Buzqov =

- Municipality
- Location within Azerbaijan
- Coordinates: 39°30′55″N 45°24′08″E
- Country: Azerbaijan
- Autonomous republic: Nakhchivan
- District: Babek

Population (2005)
  - Total: 990
- Time zone: UTC+4 (AZT)

Aşağı Buzqov (also, Ashaghy Buzqov, Ashaga-Buzgov, Ashagy-Bizgov, and Ashagy-Byzgov) is a village and municipality in the Babek District of Nakhchivan, Azerbaijan. It is located 40 km in the north from the district center, on the bank of the Buzgovchay River. Iys population is busy with gardening, beekeeping and animal husbandry. There are secondary school, library, club, mosque and a medical center in the village. It has a population of 990. The postal code is AZ 6711.

== Etymology ==
The components of “buz” in the area names of Shahbuz, Buzqov in the territory of Nakhchivan comes from “bus” tribes, one of the tribes of the Medes. "Buz", "bus" as well as "bos" is "boz oğ" (gray arrow) which is considered a main branch of Oghuz Turks. Yet in the first centuries of the millennium and early Middle Ages, the name of Turkic tribes which settled in Nakhchivan as Turkesh, Pechenegs, Kangars, Az, Ahura, Shada, Yaychi, Karabakhlar, Garachug, Gyzylja and other tribes are reflected in geographical names of Nakhchivan which a part of them are encountered in epos of the "Book of Dede Korkut".
