= Ttujur, Gegharkunik =

Village in Gegharkunik, Armenia

Ttujur Թթուջուր
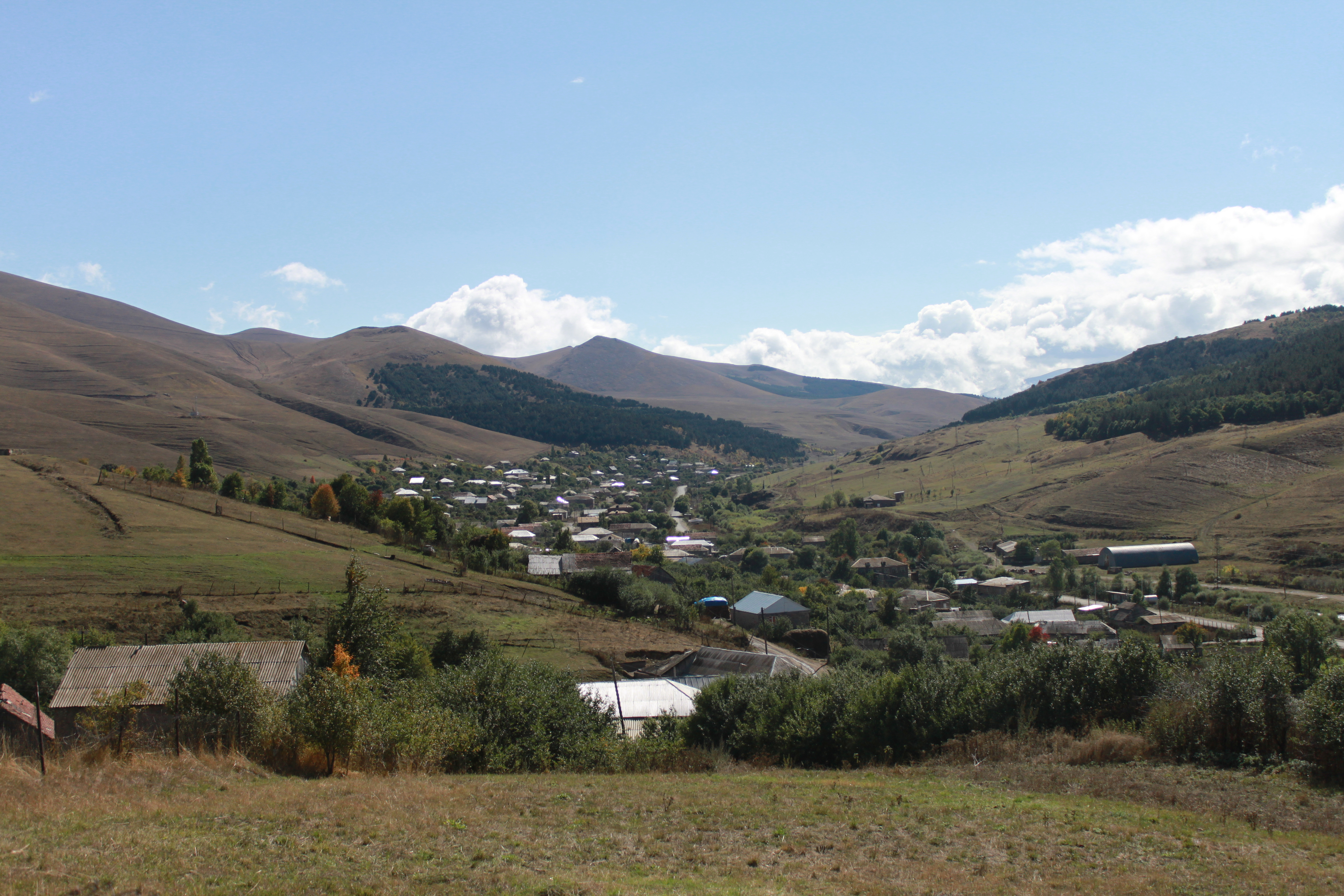
- A view of Ttujur

- Location within Armenia Location within Gegharkunik
- Coordinates: 40°38′50″N 45°18′40″E
- Country: Armenia
- Province: Gegharkunik
- Municipality: Chambarak
- Elevation: 1,741 m (5,712 ft)

Population (2011)
  - Total: 942
- Time zone: UTC+4 (AMT)
- Postal code: 1312

Ttujur (Armenian: Թթուջուր, lit. 'Sour water') is a village in the Chambarak Municipality of the Gegharkunik Province of Armenia. The village is home to the medieval "Kotrats Church" and the nearby ruined settlement of Tsak Kar.

== History ==
On May 6, 2010, the "Monument of Glory and Immortality" was erected in the village dedicated to the German-Soviet War, where 61 Armenians from Ttujur were killed during World War II. The ceremony was conducted within the frames of the 65th anniversary of the Soviet victory over the Nazi Germans. The inauguration ceremony was attended by the Russian ambassador to Armenia.

== Gallery ==
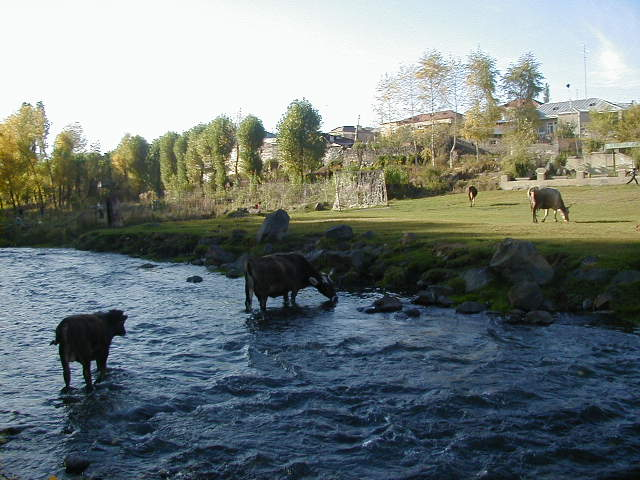
Getik river in Ttujur

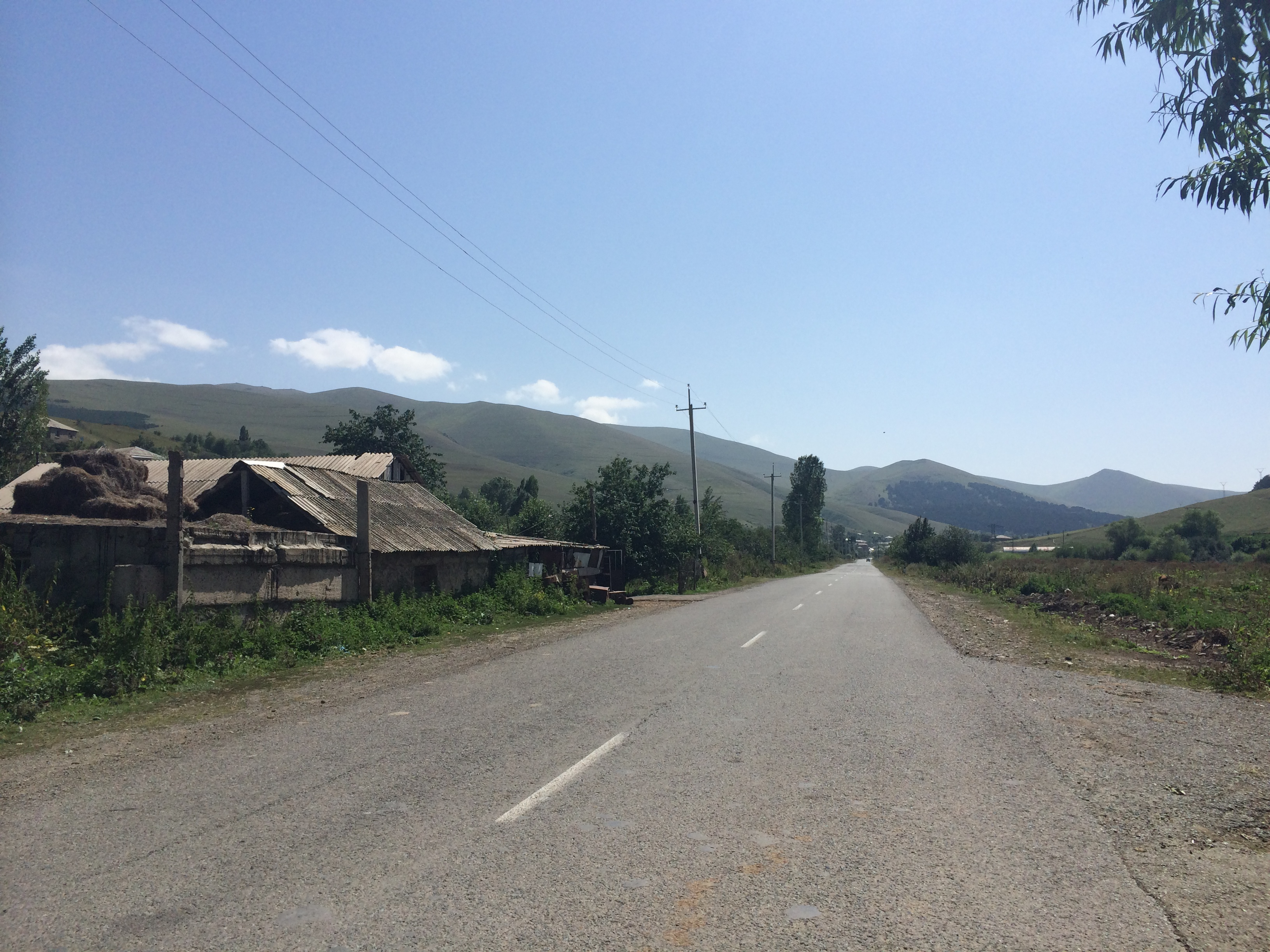
Road in Ttujur
