= Yuxarı Gəyəli =

- Location within Azerbaijan
- Coordinates: 39°10′58″N 46°28′23″E
- Country: Azerbaijan
- Rayon: Zangilan
- Time zone: UTC+4 (AZT)
  - Summer (DST): UTC+5 (AZT)

Yuxarı Gəyəli (also, Yukhary Geyali) is a village in the Zangilan Rayon of Azerbaijan.
