= Fərəhli =

- Location within Azerbaijan
- Coordinates: 41°06′23″N 45°08′45″E
- Country: Azerbaijan
- Rayon: Qazakh
- Time zone: UTC+4 (AZT)
  - Summer (DST): UTC+5 (AZT)

Fərəhli (also, Fakhraly, Farakhli, and Farakhly) is a village in the Qazakh Rayon of Azerbaijan.
