= Göyəlli =

- Municipality
- Location within Azerbaijan
- Coordinates: 40°41′51″N 45°25′19″E
- Country: Azerbaijan
- Rayon: Gadabay

Population
  - Total: 1,393
- Time zone: UTC+4 (AZT)
  - Summer (DST): UTC+5 (AZT)

Göyəlli (also, Göyəli, Geyali, and Geyalli) is a village and municipality in the Gadabay Rayon of Azerbaijan. It has a population of 1,393.

== Notable natives ==
- Aytakin Mammadov — National Hero of Azerbaijan.
