= July 2020 Armenian–Azerbaijani clashes =

Border clashes between Armenia and Azerbaijan

- Part of the Nagorno-Karabakh conflict
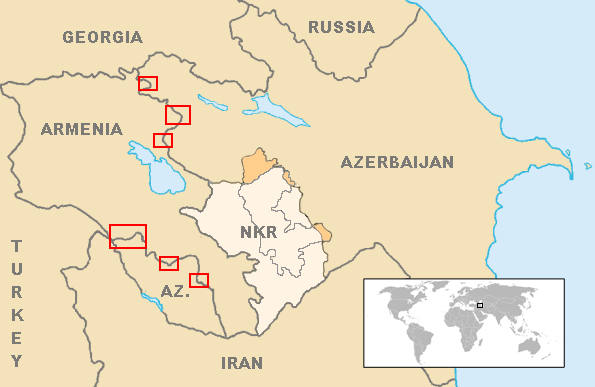
- Locations of confirmed skirmishes marked with red squares.
Date	12–16 July 2020 (4 days)
Location	Mainly Tavush, Armenia/Tovuz, Azerbaijan; Minor fighting near Chambarak, Armenia/Qazakh, Gadabay, Azerbaijan and Nakhchivan–Armenia border
Result	Both sides claim victory: 2020 Azerbaijani protests
Territorial changes	Status quo ante bellum

Belligerents
Armenia	Azerbaijan

Commanders and leaders
(Armenia) Nikol Pashinyan (Prime Minister, Commander-in-Chief); Armen Sargsyan (President) (Armenia) David Tonoyan (Minister of Defence) (Armenia) Ruben Sanamyan (Field Commander)	(Azerbaijan) Ilham Aliyev (President, Commander-in-Chief) (Azerbaijan) Zakir Hasanov (Minister of Defence) (Azerbaijan) Maj. Gen. Polad Hashimov † (3rd Corps chief of staff)

Units involved
Armed Forces of Armenia	Azerbaijani Armed Forces

Casualties and losses
Per Armenia: 6 soldiers killed; 35 servicemen injured; 2 police officers and 1 Armenian civilian injured; 1 fire engine; Azerbaijani claim: ~120 soldiers killed; 1 tank destroyed; 1 APC destroyed; 5 UAVs downed; 1 EW unit destroyed; Several armored vehicles destroyed	Per Azerbaijan: 12 servicemen and 1 civilian killed; 4 soldiers wounded; Armenian claim: 21 soldiers killed; 13 UAVs downed; 3 tanks destroyed

The July 2020 Armenian–Azerbaijani clashes (Note: Also called Tavush clashes (Armenian: Տավուշի բախումները Armenian pronunciation: [tɑvuʃiˈ bɑχumnɛˈɹə]) or Tovuz clashes (Azerbaijani: Tovuz döyüşləri).) began on 12 July 2020 between the Armenian Armed Forces and Azerbaijani Armed Forces. Initial clashes occurred near Movses in Tavush Province of Armenia, and Ağdam in Tovuz District of Azerbaijan at the Armenian–Azerbaijani state border.

Both sides accused each other of reigniting the conflict, which erupted near the Ganja gap, a strategic route that serves as an energy and transport corridor for Azerbaijan. According to ex-presidents of Armenia, Robert Kocharyan and Serzh Sargsyan, the skirmishes were provoked by Armenia, and Russian minister of foreign affairs Sergey Lavrov stated that "a trigger of sorts was the geographical factor: Armenia’s decision to restore an old border checkpoint, located in 15km distance from Azerbaijan’s export pipelines, caused strong concerns on one side and unwarranted response from the other". According to Stefan Meister, the head of the Heinrich Böll Foundation’s office for the South Caucasus, the escalation was caused by the Azerbaijani side entering the Armenian territory to which the Armenians reacted immediately. The International Crisis Group states that the violence erupted after an Azerbaijani military vehicle drove close to the border with Armenia near the Armenian village of Movses.

The skirmishes continued on 13 July and continued with varying intensity, injuring many, and killing at least 17 military and one civilian. Among Azerbaijani military casualties were one major general, one colonel and two majors. The government of Armenia also reported the deaths of one major, one captain and two sergeants. The skirmishes were conducted mainly through artillery and drones, without infantry.

Hostilities between the two sides resumed on 27 September 2020, this time in Nagorno-Karabakh rather than the same areas as the July clashes. This ultimately escalated to the scale of full-on warfare, resulting in the Second Nagorno-Karabakh War.

== Background ==
The primary matter of contention between the warring sides is the Nagorno-Karabakh conflict that escalated to the First Nagorno-Karabakh War between 1988 and 1994, between the majority ethnic Armenians of Nagorno-Karabakh backed by Armenia, and the Republic of Azerbaijan. By the end of the war in 1994, the Armenians were in full control of the enclave (with the exception of the Shahumyan Province) in addition to areas of Azerbaijan proper connecting the enclave to Armenia. A Russian-brokered ceasefire, the Bishkek Protocol, was signed in May 1994, but numerous violations of the ceasefire have occurred since then, most notably the 2016 Nagorno-Karabakh clashes. Skirmishes have also spilled over to the Armenian–Azerbaijani state border outside Nagorno-Karabakh, with the 2012, 2014 and 2018 border clashes being prominent.

Tovuz District, the site of the main skirmishes, lies opposite to Armenia's Tavush Province, in Azerbaijan's northwestern and borderline territories, along the routes of the Baku–Tbilisi–Akhalkalaki–Kars railway, Baku–Supsa Pipeline, Baku–Tbilisi–Ceyhan oil pipeline, South Caucasus Pipeline, and the Southern Gas Corridor. The Southern Gas Corridor is a major pipeline that carries natural gas from Azerbaijan to Turkey and Europe through Georgia, located 78 kilometers west of the town of Tovuz.

== Timeline ==
=== 12 July ===
The exact cause of the initial skirmishes has been unclear. At 16:08, the Azerbaijani Ministry of Defence reported that starting from the afternoon "units of the Armenian Armed Forces, grossly violating the ceasefire on the direction of the Tovuz region of the Azerbaijani–Armenian state border, fired on our positions using artillery mounts". According to Azerbaijani Meydan TV reporter, Habib Muntazir, artillery fire was also conducted from Goranboy District, but this was not confirmed. In December 2020, the former president of Armenia Robert Kocharyan declared that the Armenian Armed Forces have provoked the clashes by attacking on Azerbaijani territory. In June 2021, the other ex-president of Armenia Serzh Sargsyan made similar statements, also adding that "simply drove Azerbaijan into a corner, and Azerbaijan certainly had to do something", referring to the Second Nagorno-Karabakh War.

Then, at 16:55, Shushan Stepanyan, press secretary of the Armenian Minister of Defence David Tonoyan posted a written statement on her Facebook account. According to Stepanyan, at around 12:30, the servicemen of the Azerbaijani Armed Forces attempted to cross the state border of Armenia in a UAZ vehicle for unknown reasons. After the warning of the Armenian side, the Azerbaijani servicemen left their vehicle and returned to their position. At 13:45, the servicemen of the Azerbaijani Armed Forces repeated the attempt to occupy the border position of the Armenian Armed Forces, now using artillery fire, but were pressured by the Armenian side, being thrown back. According to Stepanyan, the vehicle previously controlled by the Azerbaijani servicemen was destroyed shortly after.

After that, at 17:20, the Azerbaijani Ministry of Defence gave a statement about the incident. According to the statement, "as a result of adequate measures taken, the enemy was hit and he was repulsed with losses". In response to statements by Stepanyan regarding the UAZ allegations, the Azerbaijani side stated that "if the Azerbaijani Army wanted to cross the state border of Armenia, it would do so not with cars, but with armored vehicles", and pointed out that the fact that the "protection of the border with Armenia in Qazakh, Ağstafa, Tovuz, Gadabay and Dashkasan was transferred from the Ministry of Defence to the State Border Service", and noted that this "confirms that Azerbaijan has no military purpose on the state border".

A recording, allegedly recorded by nearby civilians, was published by local Azerbaijani media. In the recording, Azerbaijani soldiers are shouting "Forward, soldier of Azerbaijan", while shooting sounds are heard in the background.

The Azerbaijani Ministry of Defence reported on 13 July that Armenian forces have attacked Azerbaijani positions in Shahbuz and Julfa districts with large-caliber weapons at 22:45.

At 22:50, Shushan Stepanyan stated that "Azerbaijani forces resumed shelling from the 82mm grenade launcher in the direction of our same position from the tank". This report was confirmed by Habib Muntazir who wrote that "the situation in the direction of Tovuz has become tense again. Artillery fire was heard on both sides" in his Twitter account.

=== 13 July ===
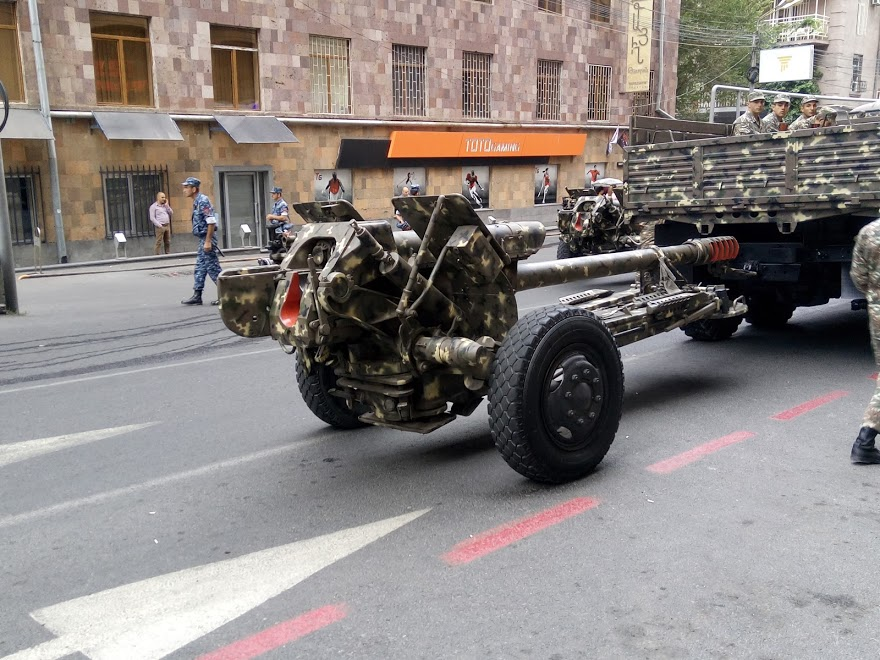
A D-30 howitzer in Armenian service, 2017

The Azerbaijani Ministry of Defence reported that clashes in Shahbuz–Julfa direction have stopped. According to the report, the use of rocket-propelled grenades and incendiary shells by the Armenian forces resulted in the burning of up to 5 hectares (0.050 km^{2}) of land area.

At 1:30, the Azerbaijan State News Agency reported that Armenian forces were shelling Ağdam, Tovuz with 120mm artillery. Stepanyan, in response to the reports, stated that the Armenian forces only targeted the "engineering infrastructure and technical means of the Azerbaijani Armed Forces".

At around 14:00, the head of the press service of the Azerbaijani Ministry of Defense, Colonel Vagif Dargahli said that Armenia's "positions, bases, artillery, vehicles, and manpower [deep in the country] were hit" in the morning. A video posted by the Azerbaijani Ministry of Defence shows an Armenian military base getting destroyed by Azerbaijani artillery fire.

At around 17:00, Stepanyan wrote that the "Azerbaijani Armed Forces have fired three projectiles from a 120 mm caliber grenade launcher in the direction of Chinari". According to her, one of the projectiles fell on the house, and two more in a yard. Azerbaijani Ministry of Defence denied these claims and stated that the "Azerbaijani side does not fire on the civilian population and civilian settlements".

At 18:45, Dargahli stated that the Armenian Armed Forces have "fired upon Ağdam and Dondar Quşçu villages of Tovuz District with 120mm mortars and D-30 howitzers", with Azerbaijani media sharing images of damaged houses. According to the information given by Ağdam municipality, all of the "women, children and the elderly were evacuated from the village", but "some residents stayed".

=== 14 July ===
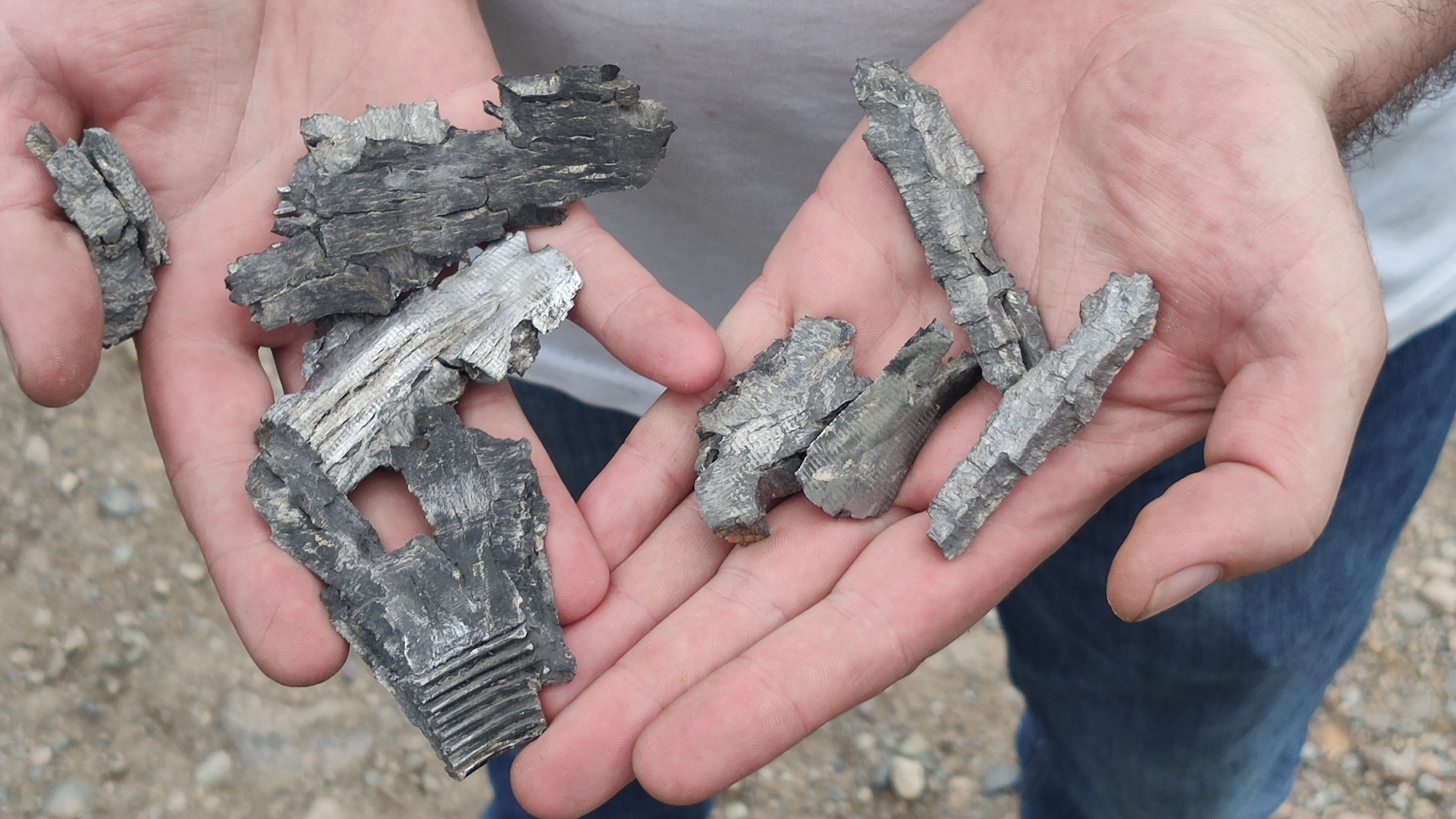
A shrapnel fired by the Armenian forces during the clashes

At around 5:30, Azerbaijani local media outlets reported that Armenian units fired at the Azerbaijani positions with large-caliber weapons from 3:00 to 4:00. Azerbaijani journalists in the area reported that more skirmishes occurred at around 7:00. At 7:21, the head of the Head of the Command and Personnel Faculty of the Vazgen Sargsyan Military University of the Ministry of Defense of Armenia, Artsrun Hovhannisyan wrote that the "night went relatively calm", despite the claims of the Azerbaijani media. Azerbaijani journalists reported that after "a few minutes of silence, the ceasefire was violated again at 8:15".

At around 9:00, Dargahli stated that the "Armenian Armed Forces fired on Ağdam and Əlibəyli villages of Tovuz District with large-caliber weapons and artillery in the morning", also noting that there were no civilian casualties in the Azerbaijani side. Meanwhile, Stepanyan wrote that Azerbaijani "tank movement was observed from combat positions of the Armenian Armed Forces and was curtailed" by fire from the Armenian side. At 09:16, Azerbaijani Ministry of Defence issued a statement, saying that the "military units of the armed forces of Armenia violated ceasefire 74 times throughout the day in various direction of the front, using large-caliber machine guns, grenade launchers, sniper rifles, 60, 82 and 120mm mortars and the other artillery mounts to escalate the situation", also noting that the attack was "suppressed by retaliation fire". Then, at 10:30, Dargahli said that the units of the Armenian Armed Forces have "fired at Dondar Quşçu village of Tovuz District with large-caliber weapons and artillery". According to him, civilians were not harmed.

At 11:16, Stepanyan stated that the Azerbaijani forces have "targeted the civilian infrastructure of Berd with a UAV strikes". According to her, there were no casualties. Less than 10 minutes later, she shared a video of Armenian forces destroying the "Azeri bases that were shelling border settlements in Tavush".

At 12:51, the Azerbaijani Ministry of Defence shared a video of Azerbaijani drones destroying Armenia's "military equipment, ammunition, command post, reserves in the depths of its defense and manpower". At about 14:28, Azerbaijani media reported that the Armenian Armed Forces have "opened fire from artillery in the direction of Xanlıqlar village of Qazakh District".

At 13:00, Armenian media outlets reported that criminal cases have been opened in the Investigative Committee of Armenia on the "fact of shelling of the Tavush branch of the State Border Service of the Police of Armenia, and of shelling of the village of Chinari in the Tavush Province of Armenia by the Azerbaijani Armed Forces".

At about 14:30, Hovhannisyan reported that on 13 July Armenian-made combat UAVs were "successfully used in action for first time". At about 15:20, Stepanyan shared satellite photos, according to which, Azerbaijani village of Dondar Quşçu was "surrounded by armed battery positions". Stepanyan said that the Azerbaijani side "surrounded its own population with gun batteries, making it become a target". At around 17:50, Armenian media outlets reported that the Armenian side got control of an "important height". Later, Hovhannisyan also stated that the Armenian forces have "gained better positions", with no confirmation from the Azerbaijani side.

According to the statement issued by Prosecutor General's Office of the Republic of Azerbaijan, "roofs of houses belonging to residents of Xanlıqlar village, Salmina Aliyeva, Mahbub Orujova, Aziz Shirinov, Ilham Mehdiyev, Razim Musayev and Kamil Jahanov" were damaged due to the "detonation of a projectile fired by a unit of the Armenian Armed Forces at about 15:00".

At 19:36, the Azerbaijani Ministry of Defence published a video, where artillery fire from Azerbaijani units allegedly destroyed a "command post of the artillery division of the Armenian Armed Forces". Azerbaijani media outlets reported that the "ceasefire was violated yet again at 19:45". This was confirmed by the Azerbaijani Ministry of Defence at 20:00, which stated that the "Armenian Armed Forces resumed intensive fire on the settlements of Tovuz District and the positions of our units using large-caliber weapons and artillery at 19.30".

A subsidiary of Russian oil and gas company Gazprom, Gazprom Armenia's press service stated that the "gas pipelines have been damaged near the border with Azerbaijan", and the "supply of gas to Nerkin Karmiraghbyur, Aygepar and partly to the settlement of Chinari has been halted" because of this.

=== 15 July ===
At 00:00, Azerbaijani Ministry of Defence publishes a video, where the "military equipment belonging to the Armenian armed forces" was allegedly "destroyed by the precise fire" of Azerbaijani units. At 7:30 Azerbaijani Ministry of Defence published another video, where the "base of a unit of the Armenian Armed Forces" was allegedly destroyed. At 15:02, Azerbaijani Ministry of Defence yet again published a video, and reported that the Armenian forces have allegedly violated the ceasefire in Şərur, Babək and Ordubad districts, also noting that Armenia's "military vehicle moving to the command observation post was destroyed" by Azerbaijani artillery fire. At 16:00, Azerbaijani Ministry of Defence published another video, where a "field control post of one of the units of the Armenian Armed Forces" was allegedly "destroyed by the precise fire" of Azerbaijani units.

At around 16:00, Hovhannisyan shared a video on his Facebook page and accused Azerbaijan of shelling Armenian villages. Few minutes later, Armenian Prime Minister Nikol Pashinyan shared a video of two "Su-30SMS"s taking off, stating that they will "go on combat duty to ensure the inviolability of the Armenian aerial borders". At around 20:00, Stepanyan stated that the "operational situation on the Armenian-Azerbaijani state border remains calm", although "random shootings have been registered from the Azerbaijani side". This was also confirmed by Hovhannisyan.

=== 16 July ===
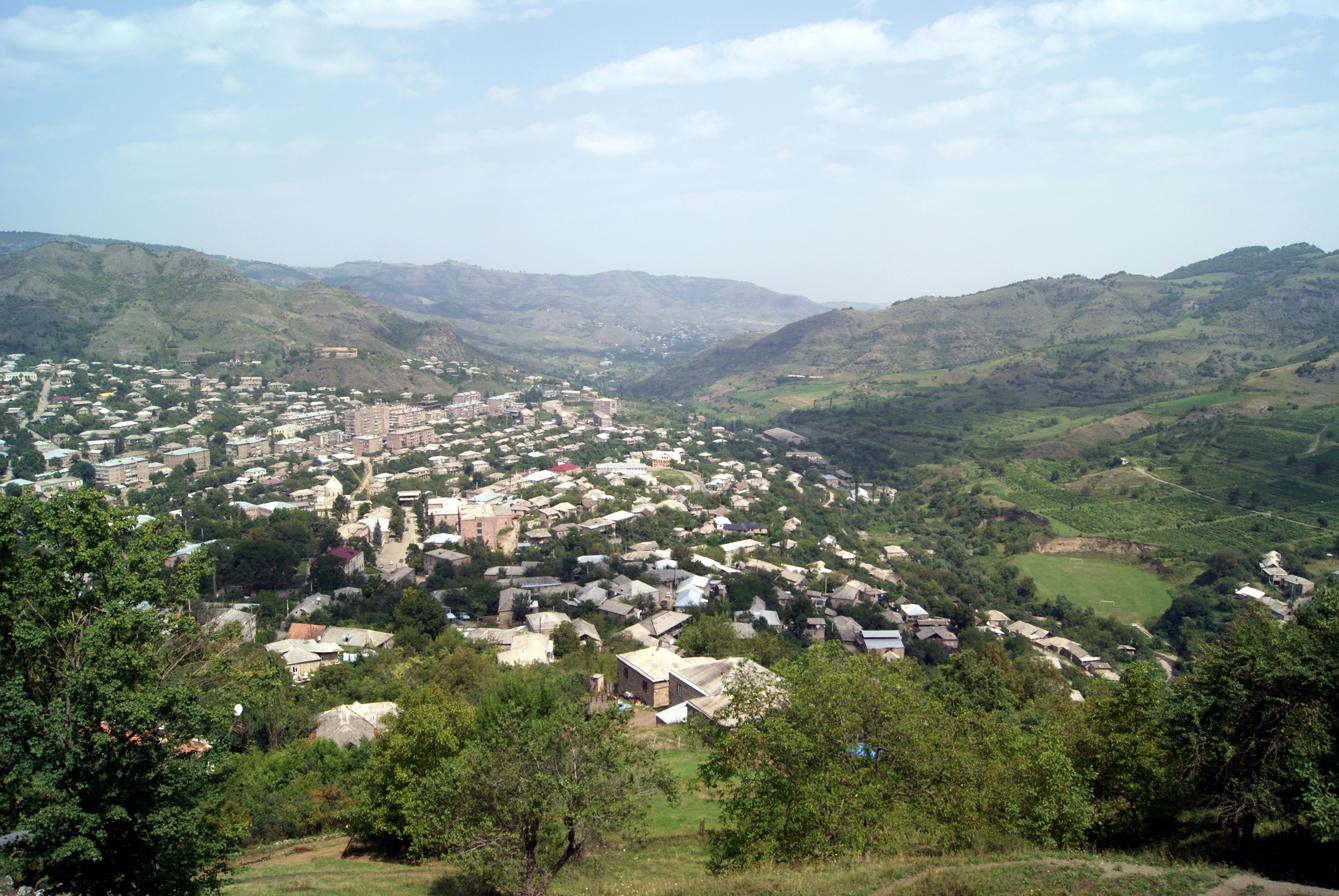
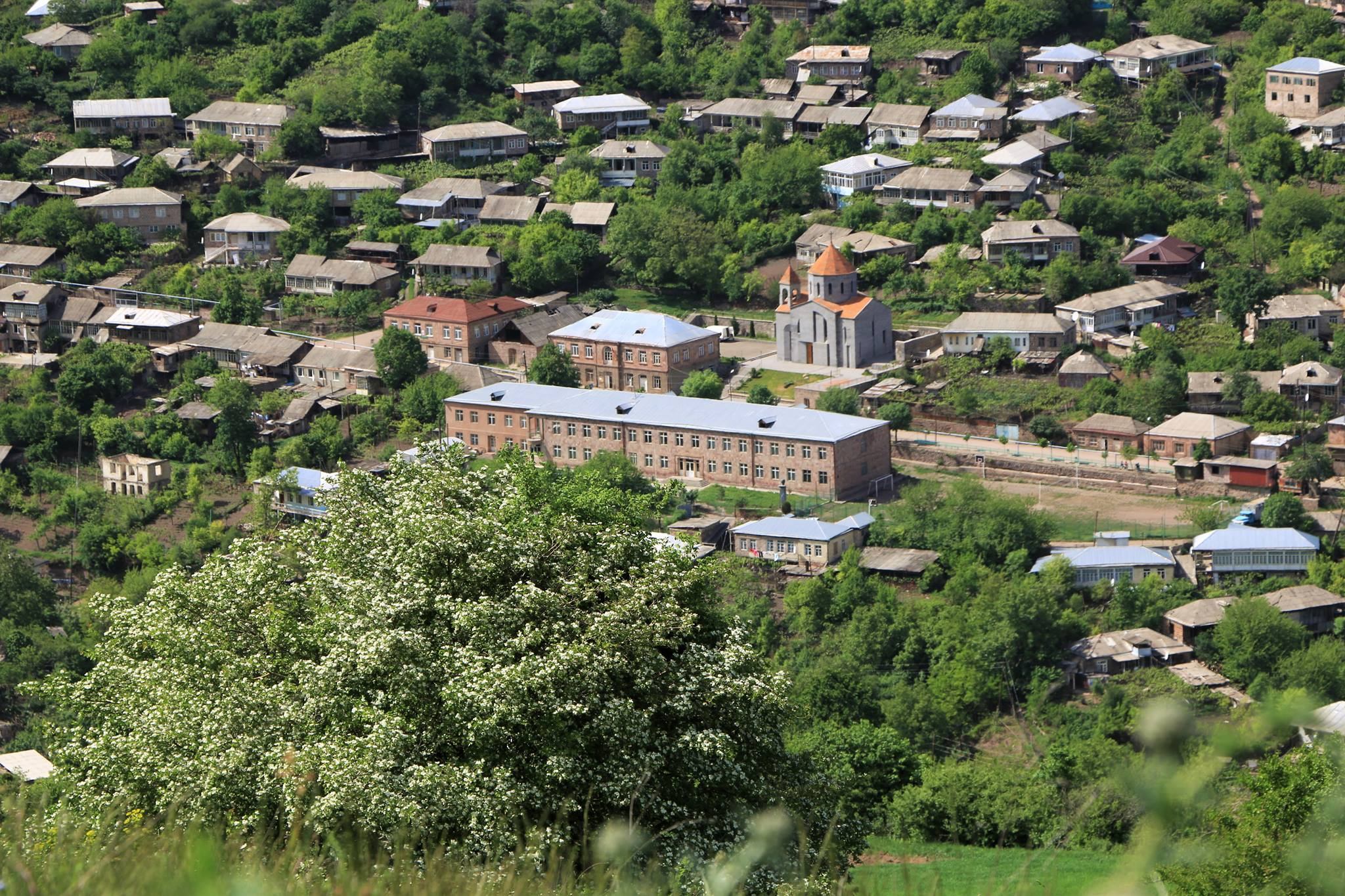
Berd (left) and Movses (right) in Tavush Province were fired upon by the units of the Azerbaijani Armed Forces, according to the Armenian side.

At 05:53, Stepanyan stated that at around 03:40, positions of the Armenian Armed Forces "noticed enemy movement", noting that the Armenian forces repelled Azerbaijan's alleged "attempt of infiltration". According to her, at 05:20, the "Azerbaijani units started shelling the villages of Aygepar, Movses, using mortars and a D-30 howitzer". Dargahli then denied these claims, saying that the Azerbaijani Armed Forces "never fire on settlements" and that on the contrary, the Armenian Armed Forces has "fired on the villages of Ağdam, Dondur Quşçu and Vahidli in the Tovuz District" this morning, where shells have "hit residential buildings".

Azerbaijani media outlets reported that the tensions yet again aggravated at about 4:00. Also, reports were made about one of the artillery shells "fired by the Armenian forces" hitting the "yard of a house in Dondar Quşçu". At 8:00, Azerbaijani Ministry of Defence confirmed these claims, stating that "Ağdam, Dondar Quşçu and Vahidli villages were fired upon with large-caliber weapons and mortars", noting that "no one was injured among the civilian population".

At about 12:50, Armenian media outlets claimed that the Azerbaijani shelling have "damaged a bakery and an adjacent house in Chinari". Then, at about 15:13 the Armenian Ministry of Defense stated that "at this moment there is no need to volunteer" and expressed its deep gratitude to the Armenian "citizens for their readiness to support the defense of the homeland's borders".

But at about 16:30, Dargahli claimed that the "recent heavy losses of the Armenian Army in the battles on the border with Azerbaijan forced the Armenian Defense Ministry to arm anyone who can handle a weapon". He also noted that the "leadership of the Armenian Army is urgently mobilizing former servicemen, conscripts, including the second and third groups of the disabled, as well as prisoners to the Tavush Province". In addition to that, he stated that "there are large gaps in the border among the enemy's personnel".

At 21:00, Azerbaijani Ministry of Defence published a video, where an Azerbaijani artillery fire allegedly destroys "military barracks belonging to the Armenian Armed Forces". An hour later, Azerbaijani Ministry of Defence published another video, this time showing an Azerbaijani artillery fire allegedly destroying "vehicles that delivered the Armenian reserve forces to" the Armenian battle positions.

=== 17 July ===
At 10:05, the Azerbaijani Ministry of Defense issued a statement, reporting that the Armenian Armed Forces "violated ceasefire 97 times throughout the day in various direction of the front". According to the ministry, the Armenian Armed Forces fired upon the Azerbaijani positions in Ağdam, and Muncuqlu in Tovuz, and Zamanlı in Gadabay.

At about 11:00, at a daily briefing, Hovhannisyan stated that the Azerbaijani Armed Forces "violated the ceasefire regime about 120 times along the entire perimeter of the border", noting that artillery was not used.

=== 18 July ===
At 09:58, the Azerbaijani Ministry of Defence issued a statement, reporting that the Armenian Armed Forces "violated ceasefire 53 times throughout the day in various direction of the front, using large-caliber machine guns and sniper rifles". According to the ministry, Armenian Armed Forces fired upon the "positions of the Azerbaijan Army located" in Ağdam, Tovuz, and in Göyəlli, Gadabay.

The Armenian side reported that the night on the border passed quite calmly, but the Azerbaijani side "violated the ceasefire several times, opening fire from small arms at the positions of the Armenian forces".

=== 19 July ===
At 10:00, the Azerbaijani Ministry of Defence issued a statement, reporting that the "military units of the Armed Forces of Armenia violated ceasefire 70 times throughout the day in various direction of the front, using large-caliber machine guns and sniper rifles". According to the ministry, Armenian forces fired upon Zamanlı in Gadabay.

The Armenian Ministry of Defense stated that the night at the border was relatively calm. In some parts of the border, however, "Azerbaijani troops fired about 70 shots".

=== 20 July ===
At 09:29, the Azerbaijani Ministry of Defence issued a statement, reporting that the "military units of the Armed Forces of Armenia violated ceasefire 60 times throughout the day in various direction of the front, using large-caliber machine guns and sniper rifles". According to the ministry, Armenian forces fired upon Koxanəbi, Əsrik Cırdaxan in Tovuz, and Zamanlı in Gadabay.

=== 21 July ===
The Azerbaijani Ministry of Defense stated that at night, around 00:30 near Agdam and in the morning at 08:45 near Tovuz two Armenian UAVs attempted to conduct reconnaissance, but were shot down by the Azerbaijani Air Defense Forces. The Armenian Ministry of Defense denied the Azerbaijani statement, calling it disinformation and lies, adding that if there is such a case, the Armenian side will be the first to report it.

According to the Ministry of Defense of Azerbaijan, Armenian forces violated the ceasefire along the line of contact, to which Azerbaijani units responded. According to the Azerbaijani MoD two Armenian servicemen were seriously wounded.

=== 22 July ===
In the morning, the press secretary of the Armenian Defense Ministry Shushan Stepanyan stated that at night the Azerbaijani forces had tried to seize the "Fearless" post, but were thrown back by the fire of the Armenian forces, suffering significant losses, while the Armenian side had no casualties or wounded. The press secretary added that some Azerbaijani servicemen were cut off from the main unit of the troops and were in a blockade. Azerbaijani Ministry of Defense denied this information claiming that there was no new attack in that direction and no losses from Azerbaijan. However, according to the head of press service of the Ministry of Defense Vagif Dargahli, on the other side of the border, there was panic among the Armenian servicemen, shots from small arms were heard at the positions of the Armenian Armed Forces.

The Azerbaijani Ministry of Defense stated that at the Agdam direction one Armenian UAV attempted to perform reconnaissance, but were shot down by the Azerbaijani Air Defense Forces.

=== 23 July ===
At 09:30, the Azerbaijani Ministry of Defence issued a statement, reporting that the "military units of the Armed Forces of Armenia had violated ceasefire 47 times throughout the day in various direction of the front". According to the ministry, Armenian forces fired upon Ağdam in Tovuz, and military positions in Gadabay.

=== 24 July ===
At 09:26, the Azerbaijani Ministry of Defence issued a statement, reporting that the "military units of the Armed Forces of Armenia had violated ceasefire 45 times throughout the day in various direction of the front". According to the ministry, Armenian forces fired upon Ağdam, and Ağbulaq in Tovuz.

Later, the Armenian Ministry of Defence issued a press release, reporting that the "military positions located near the settlements of Chiva, Khndzorut, Movses, Paravakar, the Azerbaijani side violated the ceasefire four times with firearms, firing about 28 shots at the Armenian positions".

=== 25 July ===
At 09:30, the Azerbaijani Ministry of Defence issued a statement, reporting that the "military units of the Armed Forces of Armenia violated ceasefire 35 times throughout the day in various direction of the front, using sniper rifles". According to the ministry, Armenian forces fired upon Ağdam in Tovuz, and military positions in Gadabay.

=== 26 July ===
At 09:44, the Azerbaijani Ministry of Defence issued a statement, reporting that the "military units of the Armed Forces of Armenia violated the ceasefire 60 times throughout the day in various direction of the front, using large-caliber machine guns and sniper rifles". According to the ministry, Armenian forces fired upon Koxanebi in Tovuz, and Zamanlı in Gadabay.

=== 27 July ===
At 01:10, the Armenian soldier Ashot Mikaelyan was shot and killed by an Azerbaijani sniper.

=== 28 July ===
At 08:55, the press secretary of the Armenian Defense Ministry Shushan Stepanyan issued a statement, reporting that "the Azerbaijani side violated the ceasefire 17 times, firing about 220 shots", adding that the shots were mainly fired at the military positions located in the direction of Chinari, Tsghun, Zangakatun, Chiva communities.

=== 29 July ===
At 08:55, the press secretary of the Armenian Defense Ministry Shushan Stepanyan issued a statement, reporting that "the Azerbaijani side violated the ceasefire regime 22 times from firearms, firing 497 shots at the Armenian positions", adding that the shots were mainly fired at the military positions located in the direction of Kolagir, Movses, Nerkin Karmiraghbyur, Koti, Yeraskh, Chiva, Zangakatun, Yelpin, Bardzruni, Angeghakot communities.

=== 30 July ===
At 09:05, the press secretary of the Armenian Defense Ministry Shushan Stepanyan issued a statement, reporting that "the Azerbaijani side violated the ceasefire regime 15 times, firing nearly 120 shots from firearms at the Armenian positions”. Shooting was reported in the direction of the military positions located near the villages of Chinari, Aygedzor, Movses, Paravakar, Koti, Yeraskh, Areni and Zangakatun. Shushan Stepanyan informed that the Azerbaijani side also fired ineffective shots twice from Igla-S and OSA-AK surface-to-air missile systems.

== Cyber attacks ==
On 14 July, Azerbaijani hackers attacked more than 30 Armenian websites, including the official websites of the Armenian government, and the Prime Minister of Armenia, posting slogans such as "Soldier of Azerbaijan", and "Karabakh is Azerbaijan, and exclamation mark", with the pictures of the Azerbaijani President Ilham Aliyev, and Mubariz Ibrahimov. In response, the Armenian side turned off the access to these websites. According to Samvel Martirosyan, no confidential information was leaked as result of the attacks, which was allegedly carried by "Anti-Armenia Team" hacker group. Then, at 19:46, Samvel Martirosyan reported on his Facebook page that one of the Armenian hacker teams had attacked, and hacked the Wi-Fi devices of about two thousand households and offices in Azerbaijan, and changed their DNS settings. In addition to that, at 20:03, "Monte Melkonian Cyber Army" claimed that they broke into the database of the Azerbaijani Navy.

On 15 July, Martirosyan reported that Armenian hackers had attacked the official website of the "Anti-Armenia Team".

== Aftermath ==
=== Casualties ===
Armenian

On 12 July, Armenian Ministry of Defence reported that there were no casualties on the Armenian side. Despite that, the Azerbaijani Ministry of Defence reported that both sides had suffered casualties.

On 13 July, Dargahli claimed that Armenian forces suffered "heavy losses" as a result of Azerbaijani artillery attacks conducted in the early morning. Later, Stepanyan wrote that two Armenian police officers who "carried out duty at the border" sustained minor injuries from the use of weapons by the Azerbaijani forces, while Chobanyan stated that 3 soldiers were wounded.

At 21:00, Azerbaijani Ministry of Defence reported that "firing positions, radar station of the intelligence unit, storage for military vehicles, tanks, armored personnel carriers, more than 20 [military] personnel, battalion headquarters, and military infrastructure units" of the Armenian Armed Forces were 'completely destroyed', but these claims were denied by Hovhannisyan.

On 14 July, at around 13:20 Deputy Minister of Defense, Lieutenant General Karim Valiyev reported that "about 100 troops, a large number of military and transport equipment, and important facilities" of the Armenian Armed Forces have been destroyed. At 14:42, Stepanyan confirmed that two Armenian soldiers have been KIA. At around 16:00, Azerbaijani Ministry of Defence reported that a "UAV belong to the Armenian Armed Forces was shot down" and that an "artillery device located in the firing position of Armenians together with combat personnel was destroyed by the accurate fire" of the Azerbaijani units. At around 18:15, Armenian Ministry of Defence confirmed that two more Armenian soldiers were KIA.

On 15 July, Stepanyan stated that ten Armenian servicemen were injured in total, while one of them was "in an extremely serious condition".

On 16 July, Azerbaijani Ministry of Defence reported that an Armenian "X-55" UAV was "immediately detected and destroyed". This claim was later denied by Stepanyan. Hovhannisyan then reported that Aramayis Hovakimyan, a resident of Chinari, was "injured after the strike of the combat UAV of the Azerbaijani side". At 17:35, Azerbaijani Ministry of Defence claimed that 20 more Armenian servicemen were killed, while another armored vehicle was destroyed. Despite that, the Armenian Ministry of Defense denied these statements.

On 17 July, the Investigative Committee of the Republic of Armenia issued a statement, confirming that 36 Armenian soldiers were wounded. 20 of them were hospitalized, and received appropriate medical care, while the other 16 servicemen had minor injuries.

On 22 July, Azerbaijan's Defense Ministry claimed that an X-55 UAV was shot down while on reconnaissance mission over Azerbaijani positions near Ağdam.

Rank	Name	Year of birth	Date of death	Date of burial	Place of burial
Captain	Sos Elbakyan	1992	14 July	15 July	Marmashen
Junior Sergeant	Smbat Gabrielyan	1999 or 2000	14 July	16 July	Chambarak
Junior Sergeant	Grisha Matjosyan		14 July		
Major	Garush Hambardzumyan	1989	14 July	16 July	Yerablur, Yerevan
Private Soldier	Arthur Muradyan Ashot Mikaelyan	2001 1989	23 July 27 july	25 July 29 July	Yerablur, Yerevan

Azerbaijani

On 12 July, Azerbaijani Ministry of Defence initially reported that 2 Azerbaijani soldiers were killed, while 5 were wounded in the clashes. A few hours later, it was reported that one of the wounded soldiers died despite medical intervention. Hovhannisyan stated that the "enemy did not suffer only human losses. They also lost a precious bird", but Azerbaijan Ministry of Defence denied these claims.

On 13 July, Dargahli said that the number of Azerbaijani casualties had risen, with an additional soldier dying. Three hours later, Armenian media shared an image of allegedly downed Azerbaijani UAV. Then, Armenian MP Andranik Kocharyan stated that the Armenian Armed Forces have shot down "several drones of the Azerbaijani side, one of which is a kamikaze drone".

On 14 July, Azerbaijani media reported that 76 year old Aziz Azizov, a civilian residing in Ağdam, died as a result of Armenian artillery fire, which was confirmed by Prosecutor General's Office of the Republic of Azerbaijan the next that. Later that day, Valiyev said that Major General Polad Hashimov and Colonel Ilgar Mirzayev were killed during the fighting in the morning. Five more soldiers were confirmed KIA afterwards. At 18:45, Stepanyan shared a video, where Armenian forces allegedly shot down an Azerbaijani "Elbit Hermes 900" UAV. Azerbaijani side denied losing any of its drones.

Hovhanisyan then stated that there was "no clear and conclusive information about the human losses suffered" by the Azerbaijani side, but noted the 11 confirmed KIAs.

On 15 July, Azerbaijani President Ilham Aliyev "sent condolences to the families of General Polad Hashimov and Colonel Ilgar Mirzayev". Stepanyan reported that the "defense units of the Armenian Armed Forces have shot down 13 UAVs" of the Azerbaijani Armed Forces, "10 of which were for combat, and 3 were reconnaissance". But this claim was denied by Dargahli next day.

On 16 July, Stepanyan wrote that "after a fierce battle", the Azerbaijani forces were "thwarted back, suffering losses". She later said that Armenian units have damaged the Azerbaijani "tanks, artillery and firing positions", but Dargahli denied this claim. At 17:35, Azerbaijani Ministry of Defence confirmed that Private Nazim Afgan oglu Ismaliyov was KIA. claimed that Armenia had "photo evidence of the removal of 10 corpses of the Azerbaijani Armed Forces from the territory of Armenia".

Rank	Name	Year of birth	Date of death	Date of burial	Place of burial
Private	Khayyam Mahammad oglu Dashdemirov	2002	12 July	13 July	Balik
Private 1st Class	Elshad Donmaz oglu Mammadov	1996	12 July	13 July	Ağdam
Sergeant	Vugar Latif oglu Sadigov	1987	12 July	13 July	Yuxarı Göycəli
Senior lieutenant	Rashad Rashid oglu Mahmudov	1992	13 July	13 July	Aşağı Cürəli
Colonel	Ilgar Anzor oglu Mirzayev	1973	14 July	15 July	Alley of Honor, Baku
Major	Anar Gulverdi oglu Novruzov	1976	14 July	14 July	Masallı
Major	Namig Hazhan oglu Ahmadov	1984	14 July	14 July	Yuxarı Salahlı
Major General	Polad Israyil oglu Hashimov	1975	14 July	15 July	Alley of Honor, Baku
Private	Elchin Arif oglu Mustafazade	1992	14 July	14 July	Həsənsu
Warrant Officer	Ilgar Ayaz oglu Zeynalli	1995	14 July	14 July	Cəlilli
Warrant Officer	Yashar Vasif oglu Babayev	1987	14 July	15 July	Köçəsgər
Private	Nazim Afgan oglu Ismaliyov	1996	16 July	16 July	Kolxəlfəli

=== Official statements ===
Armenian

On 12 July, Anna Naghdalyan, spokeswoman of Armenian Minister of Foreign Affairs accused Azerbaijani Armed Forces of violating the ceasefire and condemned the Azerbaijani government for it. According to Naghdalyan, the "entire responsibility for the provocative actions carried out in the face of these threats lies with the military-political leadership of Azerbaijan".

Hayk Chobanyan, Governor of Tavush Province stated that "the army is in full control of the situation, there is no need to worry and panic".

Nikol Pashinyan, Prime Minister of Armenia shared a video posted by his wife Anna Hakobyan a few days ago, where a girl dances to the song "Our Name is the Armenian Army" in the yard of a private house.

On 13 July, the Armenian Ministry of Foreign Affairs issued a statement regarding "unconditional support" stated by the Turkish Foreign Ministry, condemning "Turkey's attempts to instigate instability" in the region.

Armenian MP Tigran Karapetyan said that the "military-political leadership of Azerbaijan did not learn from the slap in the face received yesterday, 12 July. Well, the choice is theirs, the answer will be very painful" and that the "leadership of the Republic of Armenia will not hesitate for a second, nor will it hesitate for a second to give an order to destroy any target when it comes to the sovereignty of the Republic of Armenia and Artsakh. This adventure will have irreversible consequences for Azerbaijan".

Naghdalyan wrote on her Facebook page that Armenia strongly condemns Azerbaijan's "ongoing attempts to maintain tensions in the northeastern part of the Armenian–Azerbaijani border", and the "criminal targeting of the population of Chinari, Aygepar villages of Tavush Province, which is a clear violation of international humanitarian law". She also noted that Azerbaijan must "unconditionally stop such actions, take the necessary steps to prevent further tensions, for which it bears full responsibility".

At around 22:52, Hovhannisyan wrote on his Facebook page: "I really like the D-30. Ağdam and D-30 are for each other. Both Ağdams".

On 14 July, Armenia's permanent and plenipotentiary representative to CSTO Permanent Council Viktor Biyagov presented the situation on the Azerbaijani–Armenian border, saying Armenia calls its "allies to demonstrate solidarity and support in line with the nature of the CSTO Charter".

On 15 July, Armenian President Armen Sarkissian stated that Azerbaijan has a "complete lack of responsibility and humanity" to "impose military actions" in the "days of the general spread of the coronavirus". He also noted that "if Azerbaijan prefers the language of force, then the Armenian Army is ready to give a worthy response to save the lives of its citizens".

On 16 July, Armenian Ministry of Foreign Affairs issued a statement, accusing Azerbaijan of "criminally targeting the civilian infrastructure", and noting that the "aggressive action took place in a treacherous violation of the earlier ceasefire agreement". At noon, Stepanyan stated that if the Azerbaijani Armed Forces "stop the fire and favorable conditions are created, the Armenian side is ready to permit the recovery and retrieval of the Azerbaijani killed and injured from the battlefield". Then, the Armenian Ministry of Foreign Affairs issued a statement, saying that the actions threatened by the Ministry of Defense of Azerbaijan are "a flagrant violation of the International Humanitarian Law in general and the First Additional Protocol to Geneva Conventions in particular", and "an explicit demonstration of state terrorism and genocidal intent of Azerbaijan".

On 17 July at a meeting of the Eurasian Economic Union Intergovernmental Council in Minsk, Armenian Prime Minister Nikol Pashinyan stated that the "aggression of Azerbaijan took place at a time when the economy and health care of all countries of the World are experiencing stress". The Prime Minister noted that Azerbaijan's "aggressive policy is directed nowhere", and that a "prerequisite for a successful fight against the pandemic is the preservation of peace and the absence of armed conflicts". Pashinyan said that Azerbaijan has taken "military action on the north-eastern border of Armenia. The Armenian Armed Forces did not fail to respond to provocative actions. Unfortunately, they continue to this day, contributing to tensions. Azerbaijan's aggressive policy, escalating leads nowhere. It will not be able to break our resolve and make unreasonable and unilateral concessions". He also noted that there is "no military solution to the conflict and there is no alternative to peace negotiations".

On 18 July, the press secretary of the Armenian Foreign Ministry categorically denied all allegations of "Armenia wanting to lure the CSTO into the conflict", noting that Armenia do not need help. According to her, "Armenia, as a member state of the CSTO, considered itself obliged to notify its colleagues and structural partners about what is happening on the border".

On 19 July, Armenian Foreign Minister Zohrab Mnatsakanyan, in an interview with Sky News Arabia, calling the skirmishes a "renewed attempt by Azerbaijan by way of attacking Armenia on 12 July to once again attempt to impose unilateral concessions from Armenia on the question of Nagorno-Karabakh", and that the "ongoing rhetoric, the very aggressive, inflammatory, warmongering rhetoric of Azerbaijani leadership addressed to Armenia, and the Armenian people in general, the territorial, historical claims to Armenia and Nagorno-Karabakh, the use of force, the threat of force, have been the clear underlying reason" of the skirmishes.

On 30 July, Armenia's Permanent Representative to the United Nations sent a letter to U.N. Secretary-General condemning "the instigation of inter-ethnic clashes and violence against the Armenian communities in various parts of the world". He noted that the "violent attacks perpetrated against ethnic Armenians in different parts of the world, involving the deliberate damage and destruction of property belonging to Armenians, including the vandalization of a school and other disruptive acts of ethnically motivated violence and aggression" were carried out with the "direct participation of Azerbaijani officials", and "the hateful and racist rhetoric dominating the political discourse of the Azerbaijani leadership constitutes all elements of incitement to violence and represents a significant indicator of risk of atrocity crimes".

Azerbaijani

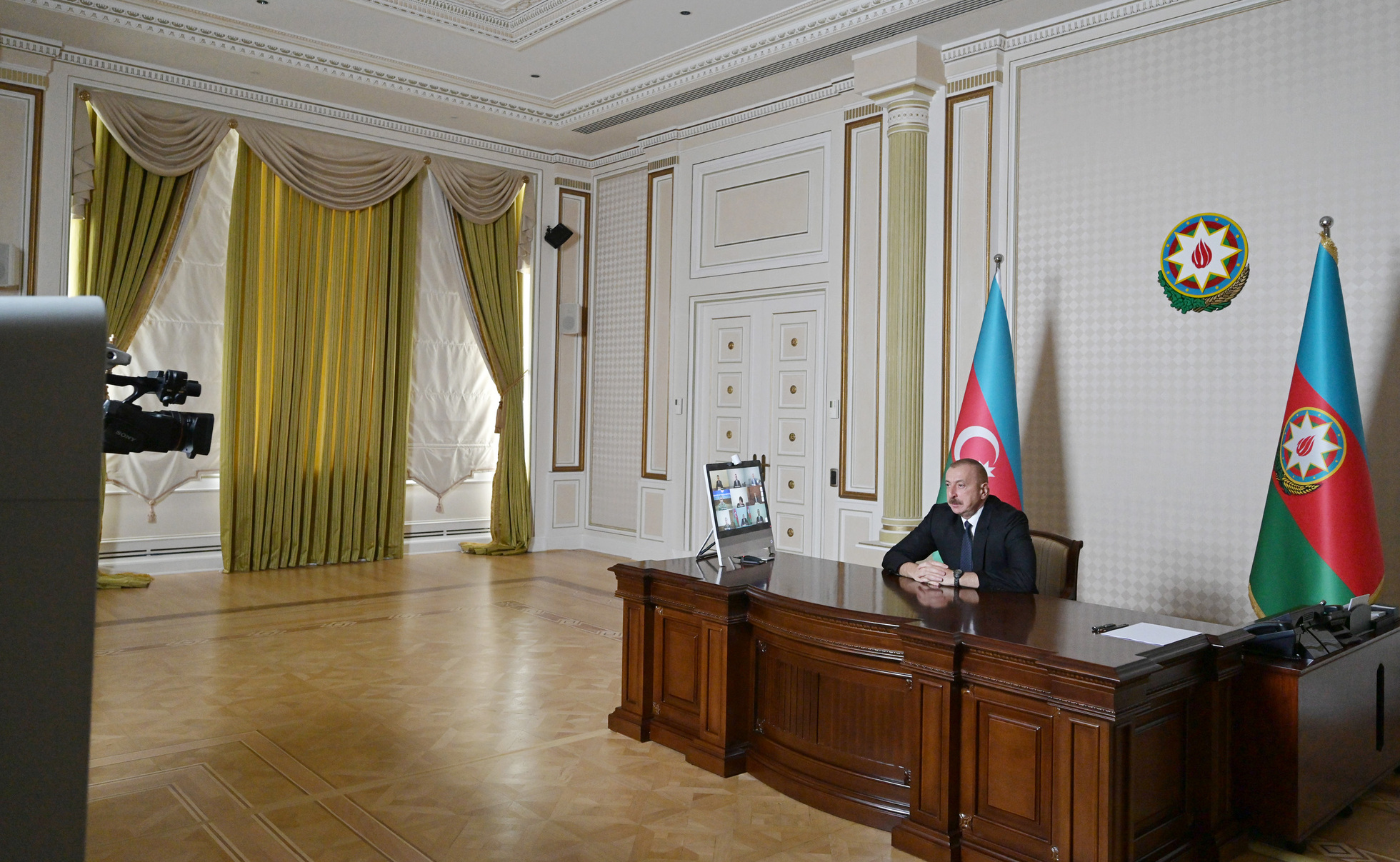
President of Azerbaijan Ilham Aliyev during an online meeting with the Azerbaijan Security Council on 13 July

On 12 July, Head of the Foreign Policy Department of the Presidential Administration of Azerbaijan Hikmat Hajiyev accused the Armenian government of "aggravating the situation and diverting attention from domestic problems against the background of socio-economic problems exacerbated by the spread of COVID-19 in Armenia as a result of incomplete policy". Azerbaijani Ministry of Defence reported that no loss of territory occurred from the Azerbaijani side during the clashes.

On 13 July President of Azerbaijan Ilham Aliyev attended an online meeting with the Azerbaijan Security Council. There, he accused Armenia of starting the military confrontation, claimed that "all the responsibility lies with the military-political leadership of Armenia", and noted that military representatives of foreign countries operating in Azerbaijan will be invited to the area to "let them see the situation with their own eyes" as soon as the operational situation allows. Then, said that the "blood of our servicemen and martyrs has not remained and will not remain on the ground. We will use every opportunity to defend ourselves and show the enemy their place again". He also talked about Armenia's "incomprehensible position" in dealing with the COVID-19 pandemic, saying that "how can it be that at a time when Azerbaijan demands that the whole world unites in this struggle, Armenia has opposed it".

Polad Bülbüloğlu, Azerbaijan's ambassador to Russia said that "Azerbaijan will never accept the loss of 20 percent of its territory".

Ali Ahmedov, Deputy Prime Minister of Azerbaijan, Deputy Chairman-Executive Secretary of the ruling New Azerbaijan Party said that the "Azerbaijani army, our knightly soldiers heroically prevented the provocations of the depraved Armenian bandits on the line of contact in the direction of Tovuz, and responded to the enemy with dignity."

Azerbaijani MP Mazahir Afandiyev said that "all provocative attempts of the Armenian side are doomed to failure", while Chairwoman of the State Committee for Family, Women and Children Affairs of Azerbaijan Republic Hijran Huseynova said that the "Azerbaijani army is ready to prevent any provocation of the enemy".

Gudsi Osmanov, Azerbaijan's ambassador to Moldova said that "against the background of the spread of COVID-19, the Armenian leadership is trying to divert attention from the socio-economic problems in the country by committing provocations against Azerbaijan with such acts of aggression. With this provocation, the Armenian leadership is trying to solve its domestic policy problems at the expense of the image of a "foreign enemy" by focusing on Azerbaijan".

Erkin Gadirli, Azerbaijani MP and co-founder of the Republican Alternative Party wrote on his Facebook page: "Do not listen to those who try to distract you from the main goal. We all have one enemy – Armenia. Armenians do not divide us into rightist or leftist, rich or poor, liberal or conservative, pro-government or anti-government, religious or atheist, Turk, Talysh, Tat, Lezgin and so on. They see us as the same – enemy".

On 14 July, Commissioner for Human Rights (Ombudsman) of the Republic of Azerbaijan Sabina Aliyeva visited Ağdam, which was "subjected to the artillery fire from the Armenian Armed Forces". She also visited the house of a resident of the village, 76-year-old Aziz Azizov, who was reportedly as a result of artillery shelling. She said that Armenia, "continuing its aggressive and occupational policy, grossly violated Article 18 of the Geneva Convention", that she condemned this act, and that she will "inform the relevant international structures about it as soon as possible".

Hajiyev said that Armenia's "impunity tempts it to further military adventures and provocations. The international community, as well as the co-chairs of the OSCE Minsk Group, must redouble their efforts. Armenia is trying to create another source of conflict in the region on the border between the two countries" and that this is Armenia's "irresponsible actions to threaten the already sensitive regional peace and security".

Leyla Abdullayeva, Chief of the Press Service of the Ministry of Foreign Affairs of Azerbaijan posted a tweet saying that the Armenian forces targeted "civilians living in the villages of Tovuz district along the state border of Azerbaijan & Armenia" and that the "aggressive & terrorist nature of Armenia is again revealed".

On 15 July, President of Azerbaijan Ilham Aliyev, at the cabinet meeting on results of socio-economic development in first quarter of 2020 and future tasks, said that after committing "dirty acts and receiving a worthy response from the Azerbaijani army, Armenia immediately turned to the Collective Security Treaty Organization and asked it for help, immediately raised a hue and cry, asking it not to let us strangle them, destroy them", also noting that "Azerbaijan did not violate the state border of Armenia, did not commit provocations and did not invade the territory of Armenia", questioning the relevance of the skirmishes to the CSTO. He then stated that "this step demonstrates their helplessness and cowardice. It shows that they cannot resist Azerbaijan on their own and they know that", saying that Armenia's "appeal to the CSTO is another manifestation of their cowardice".

On 16 July, the head of the press service of the Ministry of Defence Vagif Dargahli, as an answer to a local journalist's question about the threat of the ex-Defence Minister of Armenia Ter-Tadevosyan's alleged suggestion of "using Mingachevir reservoir as a target", told that the "relief of the territory where the Mingachevir reservoir is located, the strengthening work implemented in this building, as well as modern air assault tools at the disposal of our Air Defense Forces do not allow to hit our strategic object". In addition to that, he stated that the "Armenian side should not forget that the latest missile systems that are in the arsenal of our army make it possible to hit the Armenian Nuclear Power Plant with high accuracy, which can lead to a great catastrophe for Armenia". Then, Azerbaijani President Ilham Aliyev said that "some diplomats have betrayed the state, and are not hiding it", also noting that they "are under the control of the special services of the countries where they live". In addition to that, he said that Azerbaijan has "enough information".

On 18 July, Bülbüloğlu stated that "Armenia's actions are a provocation aimed at luring the CSTO countries, especially Russia as the main member of the bloc to this conflict, since it did not occur on the line of contact with Nagorno-Karabakh, but on the border of Armenia and Azerbaijan".

On 21 July, during a press conference, Hajiyev said that the "provocation committed by Armenia on July 12 in the direction of Azerbaijan's Tovuz in the Azerbaijani-Armenian border was pre-planned", was "aimed at diverting attention from the settlement of the Nagorno-Karabakh conflict, aggravating the situation on the border and endangering the region, involving third parties in the conflict, damaging the international success of Azerbaijan, the East-West Transport Corridor, bringing the region face to face with new environmental threats". In addition to that, he stated that Azerbaijan is not "going to participate in the imitated negotiations on the Nagorno-Karabakh conflict", and that "mandate envisions holding negotiations, guided by international principles, the Helsinki Final Act and UN Security Council resolutions". Then, he added that "in contrast to Armenia, Azerbaijan has never planned attacks on civilian targets. The Armenian side is deliberately trying to politicize the problem by spreading such misinformation. The Azerbaijani side has never voiced the idea of attacking civilian targets. The Armenian side, however, has repeatedly made threatening statements about striking the Mingachevir water reservoir, oil and gas pipelines and cities of Azerbaijan". In addition to that, he said that the "Armenian military and political leadership creates bogus companies, and weapons purchased at low prices are then sold to third parties", noting that "there is strong evidence that these weapons fall into the hands of terrorists", calling on the "countries cooperating with Armenia to be more careful".

On 22 July, President of the Republic of Azerbaijan Ilham Aliyev, during a phone call with United Nations Secretary-General Antonio Guterres, expressed his "gratitude to the UN Secretary-General for his phone call and personal attention to the events at the border". Aliyev said that the "Armenian side had fired not only on Azerbaijani military but also targeted Azerbaijani villages, killing a 76-year-old civilian along with the Azerbaijani servicemen".

=== Detention of Rahim Gaziyev ===
On 13 July, Azerbaijani State Security Service and Prosecutor General's Office of the Republic of Azerbaijan issued a statement, accusing former Azerbaijani Defense Minister Rahim Gaziyev of deliberately spreading "untrue information about the nature of the events on social network platforms", acting "to weaken the defense capabilities of the Republic of Azerbaijan", and inciting "riots and violent seizure of state power". Gaziyev was detained as a suspect in a criminal case under Articles 281 (public incitement against the state) and 282 (provocation) of the Criminal Code of the Republic of Azerbaijan. Gaziyev's daughter Sevinj Jamilova said that "these criminal codes have nothing to do with my father".

=== Dismissal of Elmar Mammadyarov ===
On 16 July, Azerbaijani President Ilham Aliyev conducted an online meeting of the Cabinet of Ministers. There, he criticized the Foreign Ministry, being unable to find the Foreign Minister Elmar Mammadyarov. Stating that while "the Prime Minister is at work, I am at work until the morning, the Minister of Defense, the Chief of General Staff, as well as the Chief of the State Security Service, the Minister of Internal Affairs, the Chief of the Foreign Intelligence Service, and the Secretary of the Security Council are at work until the early hours of the morning", Aliyev asked about Foreign Minister's whereabouts. Prime Minister Ali Asadov replied that Mammadyarov was "working from home". Mammadyarov was dismissed from his position a few hours later. Jeyhun Bayramov was swiftly appointed as a new Foreign Minister.

=== Georgia and Serbia's involvement ===
On 19 July, Haqqin.az, a news website tied to the Azerbaijani security services, reported that several days before the attack and during the height of hostilities, a large batch of mortar ammunition of various calibers was delivered from Serbia, which acquired a license to export armaments to Armenia in 2019, through Georgia to Armenia.

The next day, Danica Veinović, chargé d'Affaires of Serbia in Azerbaijan, was summoned by Azerbaijan's Ministry of Foreign Affairs, and met with Deputy Foreign Minister Khalaf Khalafov. Khalafov said that "according to reliable and confirmed information, a large amount of ammunition was sent from Serbia to Armenia, including mortars and ammunition of various calibers". In response, Veinović said that she had no information about the mentioned issues, promised to deliver the information to the Serbian side.

Salome Samadashvili, a leader of the Georgia's opposition party United National Movement said that Georgia knows that "Russia’s policy of destabilizing the region is partly based on supplying arms to both Armenia and Azerbaijan", and that Georgia has "an international obligation not to transport military cargo through Georgia to any of the parties to the conflict", calling on the "Foreign Ministry to lend clarity to this issue immediately". Gia Volski, the deputy speaker of the Georgian Parliament and a senior member of the ruling Georgian Dream party, dismissed the report as nothing but gossip, saying that "there are several media outlets – both in Azerbaijan and Georgia – that unfortunately picked up this rumor".

The Ministry of Foreign Affairs of Georgia then issued a statement, calling the claims of the transportation of military ammunition to Armenia from Serbia through the territory of Georgia "disinformative", and noting that it is "aimed at artificially creating problems on relations between the two strategic partners".

On 21 July, Rasim Ljajić, Serbian Minister of Trade, Deputy Prime Minister confirmed weapon exportation to Armenia. According to him, weapons, for which the approval of four Serbian ministries was obtained, were exported by a private company in May and June. Ljajić said that everything was legal since there had not been sanctions implemented by international organizations against Armenia. He added that total cost of the armaments does not exceed a million euros.

On 23 July, Khalafov stated that "an investigation into the Armenian attacks revealed that the weapons were of Serbian origin." Deputy Foreign Minister noted that the Ministry is awaiting official comments by Serbia regarding the final remarks of Azerbaijan.

On 31 July, the President of Serbia, Aleksandar Vučić, answered a question about weapon sales to Armenia. He said that both Armenia and Azerbaijan are friendly countries for Serbia, and weapons produced by Serbia are sold to both. He noted, that "over the past few years, we have sold ten times more weapons to Azerbaijan".

=== Jordan's involvement ===
On 24 July, Haqqin.az, yet again published a report, this time accusing the Hashemite Kingdom of Jordan of "exporting weapons to Armenia". The next day, Azerbaijani MP Fazil Mustafa wrote on his Facebook page that if the "investigation by haqqin.az is confirmed true", he "will resign from the Azerbaijan-Jordan inter-parliamentary working group". He added that as a "devout Muslim", he considers someone who "arms an enemy who is killing Muslims more dangerous than the Armenians".

On 27 July, the Ambassador of Jordan to Azerbaijan was summoned to the Azerbaijani Ministry of Foreign Affairs. Deputy Foreign Minister of Azerbaijan Araz Azimov and the Jordanian Ambassador Sami Abdullah Ghosheh held a meeting. Azimov said that the "reports on Jordan's arms sales to Armenia caused dissatisfaction in the public when Armenia's recent military provocation on the international border of the two countries has demonstrated its aggressive intentions".

=== Israel's involvement ===
Armenian officials and media outlets reported that during the clashes Armenia had successfully downed Israeli-made drones operated by Azerbaijan. On 29 July, Armenian minister of foreign affairs Zohrab Mnatsakanyan told The Jerusalem Post, "Arms trade to Azerbaijan is fatal, because Azerbaijan never hesitates to use those weapons against civilian infrastructure, the civilian population". He further said, "Israel needs to halt all weapon sales to Azerbaijan"; he promised that the Ministry would "consistently pursue this issue". In 2016, Azerbaijani president Aliyev revealed that his country had signed $5 billion worth of long-term contracts with Israel to buy weapons and security equipment.

=== Azerbaijani–Turkish military exercises ===
Armenian authorities accused Turkey for "resorting to unprecedented threats against Armenia and unilateral support to Azerbaijan" during the clashes. According to the Armenian Foreign Ministry, the holding of joint Turkey-Azerbaijan large-scale military exercises "further aggravates the situation". On 29 July, the Permanent Mission of the Republic of Armenia to the OSCE circulated a note verbale informing that the Republic of Armenia will suspend military inspections and guest inspectors from Turkey under the CFE treaty and the Vienna Document on the territory of the Republic of Armenia.

On 31 July, during a telephone call to Erdogan President Ilham Aliyev highly appreciated the "strong support of the President of Turkey in connection with the recent events on the Azerbaijani-Armenian border".

In an interview to RFE/RL, Armenian Security Council Secretary Armen Grigoryan said that the reason for Turkey's recent support to Azerbaijan is the "serious failures of the Ilham Aliyev's administration" during the Tavush clashes.

=== Vandalism in KZV Armenian School ===
On 24 July, KZV Armenian School and its adjacent Armenian Community Center in San Francisco were vandalized with racist anti-Armenian graffiti. The messages contained curse words and appeared to be connected to increased tensions between Azerbaijan and Armenia. The US House of Representatives Speaker Nancy Pelosi noted that the "KZV Armenian School is a part of the beautiful fabric of our San Francisco family. The hateful defacing of this place of community and learning is a disgrace". San Francisco District Attorney Chesa Boudin, San Francisco Mayor London Breed and lieutenant governor of California Eleni Kounalakis also condemned the act. California Governor Gavin Newsom wrote that "these acts of hatred have no place in California". California State Senator Anthony Portantino called "on Azerbaijan to stop the unprovoked violence on the Armenian border and end this assault on American institutions where we send our children”.

=== Military awards ===
Four Armenian servicemen who were killed on 14 July were posthumously awarded with the decrees of the Armenian President Armen Sarkissian. By a Presidential decree, the commanders of 1st and 5th Army Corps, Colonel Zhirayr Poghosyan and Colonel Andranik Piloyan, who took part in the skirmishes, were awarded the rank of Major General.

On 25 July, by the decree of the President of Armenia, a private of the Armed Forces of Armenia Artur Muradyan was posthumously awarded the medal "For Combat Service".

On 14 August, the Prime Minister of Armenia Nikol Pashinyan has signed a petition asking President Armen Sarkissian to award a group of participants of the clashes with the first and second class Order of The Combat Cross, as well as to honor captain Ruben Sanamyan with the title of National Hero of Armenia. On 18 August, by the President Sarkissian's decree, Ruben Sanamyan has been awarded the Order of the Homeland and the highest title of National Hero of Armenia for "exceptional courage, selflessness and bravery in ensuring the defense and security of the homeland". 199 more servicemen of Armenia have been awarded state awards.

== Reactions ==
=== Domestic reactions ===
Armenian

On 13 July, Bagrat Galstanyan, Primate of the Tavush Diocese of the Armenian Apostolic Church said that "no matter how much the enemy forces try to cause trouble, this is our village, our people, peaceful and calm, ready for anything at any moment" and that the Armenian people are "in this situation together. Both the losses and achievements are ours".

On 15 July, several dozen representatives of the youth wing of the Armenian Revolutionary Federation held a rally in front of the Ukrainian Embassy in Yerevan and poured borscht on the building, because of the statement issues by Ministry of Foreign Affairs of Ukraine on 13 July.

Turkey's support to Azerbaijan during the clashes and Erdogan's subsequent statements are seen by many ethnic Armenians as a demonstration of Turkey's genocidal intentions.

Azerbaijani

On 12 July, a few hours after the initial clashes, civilians in Ağdam village held a demonstration in support of the Azerbaijani soldiers.

At around 23:00, mass pro-war protests erupted in Qobu, where Azerbaijani IDPs live. Protesters shouted "Karabakh!", "Freedom!", and "Martyrs do not die, the homeland will not be divided" while moving to Freedom Square. Local police intervened, but were initially not able to stop the protesters. At around 1:00, protestors reached Sabail. Protesters were broadcasting the events via Facebook Live. Around 30 thousand people were watching it. At around 1:40, Rapid Police Unit dispersed the crowd, and live-stream was deleted.

At around 03:20, pro-war protests erupted in Xocəsən, which lasted for 20 minutes until Rapid Police Unit and Internal Troops intervened.

At around 20:00, a group of protesters with Azerbaijani and Turkish flags gathered in Tovuz District to support the Azerbaijani Armed Forces. The protesters, who showed the "Grey Wolves gesture", chanted slogans such as "we are fearless Turks!" and "long live Azerbaijan!". The protesters wanted to voluntarily join the army.

On 14 July, at around 16:00, "Karabakh March" started in Sumqayıt and Əhmədli, where hundreds of participants shouted chants such as "Azerbaijan!", "Karabakh is ours!", "Martyrs do not die, the homeland will not be divided", and "You have a martyr, Sumqayıt". The demonstrations then spread to others parts of Baku, gathering thousands of participants. According to the participants, there were around 15 thousand demonstrators when they reached the Maiden Tower. At 23:30, the demonstrators reached Martyrs' Lane, shouting chants like "Either Karabakh, or death!" and "Let the quarantine end, let the war begin!". BBC News reported that up to 30 thousand demonstrators took the streets. According to Muntazir, there were about 10 thousand demonstrators at the end of the initial demonstrations.

After the initial demonstrations, a smaller group breached the National Assembly. The demonstrators, who gathered on the first floor of the National Assembly, damaged number of the properties of the Parliament that worths 22,150 AZN in total. Police called on the demonstrators to leave the building and they were evicted from the parliament building. Despite that, some demonstrators started to throw stones at police officers, and injured seven police officers. In addition to that, the demonstrators turned over and damaged two cars owned by State Traffic Police Department, and damaged 14 more state-owned cars.

In a screed delivered on 15 July, the day after the rally, President Aliyev targeted the largest opposition party, the Popular Front Party of Azerbaijan. He declared that “we need to finish with the ‘fifth column‘" and the Popular Front is “worse than the Armenians.” Azerbaijani security services began arresting party members and others. According to Azerbaijani sources as many as 120 people are currently held in jail, including some deputy leaders of the party as well as journalists. On 20 July the U.S. State Department urged Azerbaijan to avoid using the pandemic to silence “civil society advocacy, opposition voices, or public discussion.” On 13 August the Amnesty International also urged to end the "violent persecution of opposition activists". These actions are widely seen as an attempt "to eliminate pro-democracy advocates and political rivals once and for all".

=== International reactions ===
Representatives of Cyprus and the United States condemned Azerbaijan, whereas representatives of Pakistan and Turkey as well as the Organisation of Islamic Cooperation and the Turkic Council condemned Armenia.

== See also ==
- First Nagorno-Karabakh War
- 2014 Armenian–Azerbaijani clashes
- 2016 Armenian–Azerbaijani conflict
- List of conflicts between Armenia and Azerbaijan
