= List of border conflicts =

The following is a list of border conflicts between two or more countries. The list includes only those fought because of border disputes. See list of territorial disputes for those that do not involve fighting. Over 50% of the world’s borders today were drawn as a result of British and French imperialism. The British and French drew the modern borders of the Middle East, 80% of the borders of Africa, in Asia after the independence of the British Raj and French Indochina and the borders of Europe after World War I as victors, as a result of the Paris treaties.

== 19th century ==
Start	Finish	Conflict	Combatants	Disputed Territories	Fatalities
1811	1812	Portuguese invasion of the Banda Oriental	Portugal v. United Provinces	Banda Oriental	Unknown
1816	1820	Portuguese conquest of the Banda Oriental	Portugal v. Federal League	Banda Oriental	Unknown
1825	1828	Cisplatine War	Empire of Brazil v. United Provinces	Banda Oriental	Unknown
1828	1829	Gran Colombia–Peru War	Gran Colombia v. Peru	pre-modern Ecuador–Peru border	~7,600
1837	1838	Upper Canada Rebellion (Patriot War)	United Kingdom (Province of Upper Canada) and United States v. Republic of Upper Canada	Canada–United States border	~325
1837	1839	Tarija War	Argentine Confederation v. Peru–Bolivian Confederation	Tarija Department	Unknown
1841	1843	Texas-Mexico boundary dispute	Mexico v. Texas	New México; Rio Grande	Unknown
1846	1848	Mexican–American War	United States v. Mexico	Texas; Santa Fe de Nuevo México; Alta California	~29,000
1859	1859	Pig and Potato War	United States v. United Kingdom (Colony of Vancouver Island)	San Juan Islands	None
1861	1865	War Between the States	United States v. Confederate States	Fort Sumter, Charleston Harbor; Arizona Territory; Border states	~1,692,000
1864	1870	War of the Triple Alliance	Paraguay v. Argentina, Empire of Brazil, and Uruguay	Uruguay; Río de la Plata Basin	378,000-500,000
1879	1883	War of the Pacific	Chile v. Bolivia and Peru	Litoral Department	~10,000
1885	1885	Panjdeh incident	Russia v. Afghanistan and United Kingdom	Kushka (present-day Serhetabat, Turkmenistan)	400 or 1042
1896	1896	Battle of Shangi	Congo Free State v. Kingdom of Rwanda	Southwestern Rwanda	Unknown
1898	1898	Fashoda Crisis	France v. United Kingdom	Fashoda, Mahdist State (modern-day Sudan)	None

== 20th century before World War II (1918-1939) ==
Start	Finish	Conflict	Combatants	Disputed Territories	Fatalities
1900	1900	Russian invasion of Manchuria (Boxers Rebellion)	Russia v. China and Society of Righteous and Harmonious Fists	Amur River	More than 1000
1910	1918	Mexican Border War	United States v. Mexico	Mexico–United States border	100+
1925	1925	Klaipėda Revolt	League of Nations under the French Administration v. Lithuania	Memelland; East Prussia, Germany	15
1925	1925	War of the Stray Dog	Greece v. Bulgaria	Petrich (modern borders with Greece and North Macedonia)	171
1932	1935	Chaco War	Bolivia v. Paraguay	Northern Gran Chaco	~100,000
1938	1938	Changkufeng Incident	Soviet Union v. Japan	Manchukuo–Soviet Union border region	~1,300
1939	1939	Slovak–Hungarian War	Slovakia v. Hungary	Eastern Slovakia	69
1939	1939	Nomonhan Incident	Soviet Union and Mongolia v. Japan and Manchukuo	Manchukuo–Soviet Union border region	~48,000

== 20th century after World War II (1945–2000) ==
Start	Finish	Conflict	Combatants	Disputed Territories	Fatalities
1945	1945	Levant Crisis	France v. United Kingdom	Syria-Lebanon and Transjordan	0
1945	1946	War in southern Vietnam	France v. Viet Minh	Southern Vietnam	2500+
1946	1948	Beitashan Incident	China v. Soviet Union and Mongolia	Chinese–Mongolian border	Unknown
1947	1948	1947–1948 Kashmir War	India v. Pakistan	Jammu and Kashmir	2000+
1947	1948	Annexation of Junagadh	India v. Junagadh	Junagadh State	Unknown
1948	1948	1948 Arab-Israel War	Arab League and All-Palestine Protectorate v. Israel	Mandatory Palestine	10000+
1948	1948	Annexation of Hyderabad	India v. Hyderabad	Hyderabad	1000+
1949	1956	Palestinian Fedayeen insurgency	Palestine Fedayeens v. Israel	West Bank and Israel	3300+
1950	1950	Chinese Invasion of Tibet	China v. Tibet	Chamdo	200+
1950	1953	Korean War	North Korea v. South Korea	Korea	3000000+
1954	1954	Annexation of Dadra and Nagar Haveli	India v. Portugal	Dadra and Nagar Haveli	2
1954	1955	First Taiwan Strait Crisis	China v. Taiwan and United States	Taiwan Strait	900+
1956	1956	Suez Crisis	Israel v. Egypt	Sinai Peninsula; Suez Canal Zone	1800+
1957	1958	Ifni War	Morocco v. France and Spain	Spanish Ifni	1000+
1958	1958	Second Taiwan Strait Crisis	China v. Taiwan and United States	Quemoy and Amoy	950+
1958	1958	1958 Pakistan–India border skirmish	Pakistan v. India	East Pakistan Border	5+
1959	1960	Dir campaign	Pakistan v. Afghanistan and Dir state	Durand Line	Unknown
1960	1961	Bajaur Campaign	Pakistan v. Kingdom of Afghanistan and Dir militants	Durand Line	Unknown
1961	1961	Annexation of Goa	India v. Portugal	Goa, Daman and Diu	50+
1961	1961	Operation Vantage	United Kingdom and Kuwait v. Iraq	Kuwait	Unknown
1961	1962	Western New Guinea War	Indonesia and Soviet Union v. Netherlands	Western New Guinea	210+
1962	1962	Sino-Indian War	China v. India	Aksai Chin	2000+
1964	1964	First Ethio–Somali Border War	Somalia v. Ethiopia	Ethiopia–Somalia border	1000+
1965	1965	Indo-Pakistani War of 1965	Pakistan v. India	Kashmir	5000+
1967	1967	Nathu La and Cho La clashes	China v. India	Nathu La and Cho La (Sikkim and Tibet)	110+
1967	1967	Six-Day War	Egypt, Syria and Jordan v. Israel	Golan Heights, Sinai Peninsula, West Bank, Gaza	12000+
1969	1969	Sino-Soviet border conflict	Soviet Union v. China	Zhenbao Island; Ussuri River	120+
1971	1971	Indo-Pakistani War of 1971	Pakistan v. India	Kashmir	4000+
1972	1972	First Yemenite War	North Yemen v. South Yemen	North Yemen–South Yemen border	Unknown
1973	1973	1973 Samita border skirmish	Kuwait v. Iraq	Samita border Outpost	Unknown
1973	1973	Yom Kippur War	Egypt and Syria v. Israel	Golan Heights, Sinai Peninsula, Suez Canal	22000+
1974	1975	Shatt al-Arab conflict	Iran v. Iraq	Shatt al-Arab	1000+
1974	1974	Turkish invasion of Cyprus	Turkiye v. Cyprus and Greece	Cyprus	7000+
1975	1975	Tulung La incident	China v. India	Arunachal Pradesh	4
1975	1991	Western Sahara War	Morocco and Mauritania v. Sahrawi Arab Democratic Republic	Western Sahara	2000+
1975	1978	Indonesian invasion of East Timor	Indonesia v. East Timor	East Timor	186000+
1977	1978	Ogaden War	Somalia v. Ethiopia, Cuba and South Yemen	Ogaden	12000+
1978	1979	Uganda–Tanzania War	Uganda v. Tanzania	Kagera Salient	2000
1979	1979	Second Yemenite War	North Yemen v. South Yemen	North Yemen–South Yemen border	2700+
1979	1979	Sino-Vietnamese War	China v. Vietnam	Cao Bằng, Lạng Sơn and Spratly Islands	50000+
1980	1988	Iran–Iraq War	Iran v. Iraq	Western Iran	500000+
1981	2005	Bakassi clashes	Nigeria v. Cameroon	Cameroon–Nigeria border	70
1981	1981	Paquisha War	Peru v. Ecuador	Cordillera del Cóndor	50+
1982	1982	Falklands War	Argentina v. United Kingdom	Falkland Islands,South Georgia and the South Sandwich Islands	800+
1982	1982	Second Ethio–Somali Border War	Somalia v. Ethiopia	Hiran and Mudug regions	400+
1983	1983	Chadian–Nigerian War	Chad v. Nigeria	Lake Chad	100+
1984	2022	Whisky War	Denmark v. Canada	Hans Island	0
1984	2003	Siachen conflict	Pakistan v. India	Siachen Glacier	1000
1985	1985	Agacher Strip War	Burkina Faso v. Mali	Agacher Strip	140+
1985	2000	South Lebanon conflict	Lebanon and Hezbollah vs Israel	Southern Lebanon	2300+
1986	1987	Sumdorong Chu standoff	India v. China	Sumdorong Chu	Unknown
1986	1987	Ciskei–Transkei War	Ciskei v. Transkei	Ciskei-Transkei Border	Unknown
1987	1988	Thai–Laotian Border War	Laos and Vietnam v. Thailand	Chat Trakan district Botene district	140+
1987	1993	First Palestinian Intifada	Palestine v. Israel	West Bank and Gaza Strip	2000+
1988	1988	Johnson South Reef skirmish	Vietnam v. China	Johnson South Reef	60+
1988	1988	First Nagorno-Karabakh War	Azerbaijan v. Armenia	Nagorno-Karabakh	17000+
1989	1991	Mauritania–Senegal Border War	Mauritania v. Senegal	Mauritania–Senegal border	Unknown
1995	1996	Third Taiwan Strait Crisis	China v. Taiwan and United States	Taiwan Strait	Unknown
1995	1995	Hanish Islands conflict	Yemen v. Eritrea	Hanish Islands	20+
1998	2000	Eritrean–Ethiopian War	Eritrea v. Ethiopia	Badme	300000
1998	2018	Eritrean–Ethiopian border conflict	Eritrea v. Ethiopia	Eritrea–Ethiopia border	100000
1999	1999	Kargil War	Pakistan v. India	Kargil district	900+

== 21st century ==
Start	Finish	Conflict	Combatants	Disputed Territory	Fatalities
2000	2005	Second Palestine Intifada	Palestine v. Israel	Israeli-occupied territories	4000+
2000	2006	2000–2006 Shebaa Farms conflict	Israel v. Hezbollah	Shebaa farms	30+
2001	2001	2001 Bangladesh–India border clashes	Bangladesh v. India	Bangladesh–India border region	19
2001	2002	2001–2002 India–Pakistan standoff	India v. Pakistan	Kashmir	700+
2002	2002	Perejil Island crisis	Morocco v. Spain	Perejil Island	0
2003	2005	Conflict in Tuzla Island	Ukraine v. Russia	Tuzla Island	0
2006	2006	2006 Lebanon War	Israel v. Lebanon and Hezbollah	Northern District, Southern Lebanon, Golan Heights	1500+
2008	2008	Djiboutian–Eritrean border conflict	Djibouti v. Eritrea	Ras Doumeira	140+
2008	2008	2008 Mardakert clashes	Azerbaijan v. Republic of Artsakh	Line of Contact	4+
2008	2008	Russo-Georgian War	Georgia v. Russia	South Ossetia and Abkhazia	340+
2008	2011	2008–2011 Cambodian–Thai border crisis	Cambodia v. Thailand	Preah Vihear	25+
2008	2008	2008 India–Pakistan standoff	India v. Pakistan	India–Pakistan border region	Unknown
2009	2009	2009 Afghanistan–Iran clash	Iran v. (Islamic Republic of Afghanistan) Afghanistan	Afghanistan–Iran border	1
2010	2010	2010 Mardakert clashes	Azerbaijan v. Republic of Artsakh and Armenia	Line of Contact	6+
2010	2010	Costa Rica–Nicaragua San Juan River border dispute	Costa Rica v. Nicaragua	San Juan River	0
2010	2010	February 2010 Nagorno-Karabakh clashes	Armenia v. Azerbaijan	Line of Contact	3
2011	2011	Wazzin Clashes	Libya v. Tunisia	Wazzin	20+
2011	2011	2011 India–Pakistan border skirmish	India v. Pakistan	Kashmir (Kupwara district and Neelum Valley)	8
2012	2012	Heglig Crisis	Sudan v. South Sudan	Unity State; South Kordofan	260+
2012	2022	Syrian–Turkish border clashes during the Syrian civil war	Syria v. Turkey	Akçakale	15+
2012	2012	2012 Armenian–Azerbaijani border clashes	Azerbaijan v. Armenia	Line of Contact	9
2012	2017	2012–2017 Lebanon–Syria border clashes	Lebanon v. Syria	Lebanon–Syria border	100+
2012	2024	Israeli–Syrian ceasefire line incidents during the Syrian civil war	Syria v. Israel	Quneitra Governorate and Golan Heights	250+
2013	2013	2013 India–Pakistan border skirmishes	India v. Pakistan	Kashmir Line of Control	28
2014	2015	2014–2015 India–Pakistan border skirmishes	India v. Pakistan	Kashmir Line of Control; Indo-Pakistani border region	55+
2014	2014	2014 Armenian–Azerbaijani clashes	Azerbaijan v. Armenia	Line of Contact	10+
2014	2014	2014 Russian annexation of Crimea	Russia v. Ukraine	Crimea	3
2014	2022	War in Donbas	Russia v. Ukraine	Donetsk and Luhansk oblasts	10000+
2016	2016	2016 Belize–Guatemala border standoff	Belize v. Guatemala	Sarstoon River	1
2016	2018	2016–2018 India–Pakistan border skirmishes	India v. Pakistan	Kashmir	165+
2017	2017	2017 Afghanistan–Pakistan border skirmish	Afghanistan v. Pakistan	Chaman	8+
2017	2017	2017 China–India border standoff	China v. India and Bhutan	Doklam	0
2018	2018	2018 Armenian–Azerbaijani clashes	Armenia v. Azerbaijan	Nakhchivan Autonomous Republic (Sharur District and Sadarak District)	2+
2018	2018	2018 Syrian Kurdish–Turkish border clashes	Rojava v. Turkiye	Northern Syria	5+
2019	2019	2019 India–Pakistan border skirmishes	India v. Pakistan	Line of Control	50+
2020	2020	2020 Armenian–Azerbaijani clashes	Armenia v. Azerbaijan	Movses, Armenia and Ağdam, Azerbaijan	17+
2020	2020	Second Nagorno-Karabakh War	Azerbaijan v. Armenia	Nagorno-Karabakh and Armenian-occupied territories	5000+
2020	2021	2020–2021 China–India skirmishes	China v. India	Sikkim, Ladakh and Line of Actual Control	30+
2020	2021	2020–21 India–Pakistan border skirmishes	Pakistan v. India	Line of Control, Kashmir	40+
2020	2022	Ethiopian–Sudanese border conflict	Ethiopia v. Sudan	Ethiopian–Sudanese border	90+
2021	2021	2021 Kyrgyzstan–Tajikistan conflict	Kyrgyzstan v. Tajikistan	Leilek District	55
2022	2022	2022 Kyrgyzstan–Tajikistan clashes	Kyrgyzstan v. Tajikistan	Kyrgyzstan–Tajikistan border	140+
2022	2022	Al-Shabaab campaign in Ethiopia	Islamic Wilayaat of Somalia v. Ethiopia	Somali Region	900+
2023	2023	January 2023 Jenin incursion	Palestine v. Israel	West Bank	5+
2023	2023	February 2023 Nablus incursion	Palestine v. Israel	West Bank	11
2023	2023	2023 Afghanistan–Iran border clash	Afghanistan v. Iran	Afghanistan–Iran border	3+
2023	2023	June 2023 Jenin incursion	Palestine v. Israel	West Bank	3+
2023	2023	July 2023 Jenin incursion	Palestine v. Israel	West Bank	13+
2023	2023	Las Anod conflict	Somaliland v. Somalia and Puntland	Sool, Sanaag and Buhodle regions	4000+
2023	2023	2023 Nagorno-Karabakh conflict	Azerbaijan v. Republic of Artsakh	Nagorno-Karabakh	300+
2024	2026	Afghanistan–Pakistan border conflict	Pakistan v. Afghanistan	Durand Line	80+
2025	2025	2025 Cambodian–Thai border crisis	Cambodia v. Thailand	Cambodia–Thailand border	150+

== Ongoing ==
Start	Finish	Conflict	Combatants	Disputed Territory	Fatalities
2020	Ongoing	Western Saharan clashes	Morocco v. Sahrawi Arab Democratic Republic	Moroccan Western Sahara Wall	15+
2021	Ongoing	Armenia–Azerbaijan border crisis	Armenia v. Azerbaijan	Armenia–Azerbaijan border	600+
2022	Ongoing	North Kosovo crisis	Kosovo v. Kosovo Serb rebels and Serbia	North Kosovo, Merdare border and Central Serbia	4
2022	Ongoing	Fourth Taiwan Strait Crisis	China v. Taiwan	Taiwan Strait	-
2022	Ongoing	Russo-Ukrainian war (2022–present)	Russia v. Ukraine	Ukraine and Russia	2,000,000+
2023	Ongoing	Israeli incursions in the West Bank during the Gaza war	Israel v. Palestine	West Bank	1,000+
2023	Ongoing	Third Lebanon War	Israel v. Lebanon and Hezbollah	Blue Line	9,000+
2023	Ongoing	Lebanon–Syria clashes (2024–present)	Syria v. Lebanon and Hezbollah	Lebanon–Syria border	5+
2024	Ongoing	Israeli invasion of Syria (2024–present)	Israel v. Syria	Quneitra Governorate and Daraa governorates	100+

== See also ==
- Border incident
- List of territorial disputes
- List of national border changes from 1815 to 1914
- List of national border changes (1914–present)
