= Pirili =

Pirili may refer to:

- Pirili, Agstafa, Azerbaijan
- Pirili, Kurdamir, Azerbaijan
