= Aghdam (disambiguation) =

Aghdam is a city in Azerbaijan. It may also refer to:

- Aghdam District, Azerbaijan
- Ağdam, Khojavend, Azerbaijan
- Ağdam, Tovuz, Azerbaijan
- Ağdamkənd, Azerbaijan
- Nasim Najafi Aghdam
