= Border incident (disambiguation) =

A border incident is an event at a border.

Border Incident may also refer to:

- Border Incident, a 1949 American film
- Border Incident (horse), a racehorse

== See also ==
- List of border conflicts
