= Nagorno-Karabakh war =

Nagorno-Karabakh war may refer to:

== Most often ==
- First Nagorno-Karabakh War (1988–1994)
- Second Nagorno-Karabakh War (2020)

Other conflicts include:

- 2008 Mardakert clashes
- 2010 Mardakert clashes
- 2010 Nagorno-Karabakh clashes
- 2012 Armenian–Azerbaijani border clashes
- 2014 Armenian–Azerbaijani clashes
- 2016 Nagorno-Karabakh conflict
- September 2022 Armenia–Azerbaijan clashes
- 2023 Azerbaijani offensive in Nagorno-Karabakh

== Military clashes outside Nagorno-Karabakh but part of the broader conflict ==
- 2018 Armenian–Azerbaijani clashes
- July 2020 Armenian–Azerbaijani clashes
- 2021–2022 Armenia–Azerbaijan border crisis

== See also ==
- Nagorno-Karabakh conflict
- Armenian–Azerbaijani war (disambiguation)
- 2020 Nagorno-Karabakh clashes (disambiguation)
- Battle of Qarabagh
