= Mazahir =

Mazahir is a masculine given name and surname of Arabic origin. Notable people with the name include:

== Given name ==
- Mazahir Abasov (1918–2002), Azerbaijani aviator
- Mazahir Afandiyev (born 1976), Azerbaijani politician
- Mazahir Amir Khan (born 1971), Pakistani politician
- Mazahir Rustamov (1960–1992), Azerbaijani war hero

== Surname ==
- Nisham Mazahir (born 1989), Sri Lankan cricketer
