= Naig Yusifov =

Azerbaijani soldier (1970–1992)

- Born: 5 January 1970; Ağdam, Tovuz, Azerbaijan
- Died: 24 March 1992 (aged 22); Koxanəbi, Tovuz District, Azerbaijan
- Military career
- Allegiance: Republic of Azerbaijan
- Service years: 1991-1992
- Conflicts: First Nagorno-Karabakh War
- Awards: National Hero of Azerbaijan; 1992

Naig Yusifov (Azerbaijani: Yusifov Naiq Nəsir oğlu) (5 January 1970 – 24 March 1992) was an Azerbaijani soldier and National Hero of Azerbaijan who was killed during the First Nagorno-Karabakh War.

== Biography ==
Naig Yusifov was born on 5 January 1970 in the village of Agdam in the Tovuz District. In 1987, after graduating from high school, he was called to serve in the Soviet Army. During the period of Naig's military service, there was a tense situation at the borders of Azerbaijan with Armenia; the border regions with Armenia were almost uncontrolled.

Since the National Army was not yet created at that time, only local self-defense battalions were overseeing the area. After completing his military service in the Soviet Army, he joined a self-defense battalion in the village.

== Military career ==
On 24 March 1992 Armenian soldiers attacked Koxanəbi, a village in the Tovuz District. He came to the village to help rescue soldiers of the Azerbaijani Army who were surrounded. After a fierce battle which lasted for about an hour, he exploded his grenade in order not to be captured by the enemy. As a result of the explosion, nearby Armenian soldiers were also killed.

== Memorial ==
He was posthumously awarded the title of "National Hero of Azerbaijan" by Presidential Decree No. 833 dated 7 June 1992. He was buried in Agdam village of Tovuz district. The school that he graduated from is named after him.

== See also ==
- First Nagorno-Karabakh War
- List of National Heroes of Azerbaijan

== Sources ==
- Vugar Asgarov. Azərbaycanın Milli Qəhrəmanları (Yenidən işlənmiş II nəşr). Bakı: "Dərələyəz-M", 2010, səh. 227.
