= Armenian War =

Armenian War may refer to:

- Armenian-Parthian War, 87-85 BCE
- Roman-Parthian War of 58-63 CE
- Georgian-Armenian War, 1918
- Armenian–Azerbaijani war (disambiguation), 1918-1922
