= Armenian–Azerbaijani war =

Armenian–Azerbaijani war may refer to:

- Armenian–Azerbaijani war (1918–1920)
- Nagorno-Karabakh conflict, primarily:
  - First Nagorno-Karabakh War (1988–1994)
  - Second Nagorno-Karabakh War (2020)

== Other conflicts this may refer to ==
- 2008 Mardakert clashes
- 2010 Nagorno-Karabakh clashes
- 2010 Mardakert clashes
- 2012 Armenian–Azerbaijani border clashes
- 2014 Armenian–Azerbaijani clashes
- 2016 Nagorno-Karabakh conflict (also called the Four-Day War)
- 2018 Armenian–Azerbaijani clashes
- July 2020 Armenian–Azerbaijani clashes
- 2021–2023 Armenia–Azerbaijan border crisis
  - September 2022 Armenia–Azerbaijan clashes
- 2023 Azerbaijani offensive in Nagorno-Karabakh

== See also ==
- List of conflicts between Armenia and Azerbaijan
- Nagorno-Karabakh war (disambiguation)
