= 2020 Nagorno-Karabakh clashes =

2020 Nagorno-Karabakh clashes may refer to:

- July 2020 Armenian–Azerbaijani clashes
- Second Nagorno-Karabakh War (27 September–10 November 2020)

== See also ==
- Nagorno-Karabakh war (disambiguation)
