= Yusif Sadykhov =

Azerbaijani Red Army starshina (1918–1971)

Yusif Madat oglu Sadykhov
- Yusif Mədət oğlu Sadıqov
- Born: 1918; Agdam
- Died: 11 December 1971 (aged 52–53); Tovuz, Azerbaijan SSR, Soviet Union
- Military career
- Allegiance: Soviet Union
- Branch: Red Army
- Service years: 1938–1945
- Rank: Starshina
- Unit: 19th Guards Mechanized Brigade
- Conflicts: World War II; Battle of Kursk; Operation Bagration; Vistula-Oder Offensive; Battle of Berlin
- Awards: Hero of the Soviet Union

Yusif Madat oglu Sadykhov (Azerbaijani: Yusif Mədət oğlu Sadıqov; 1918 – 11 June 1971) was an Azerbaijani Red Army Starshina and Hero of the Soviet Union. Sadykhov was a gun commander in an artillery battalion and was awarded the title for his actions during the Vistula–Oder Offensive. In the offensive, he was credited with knocking out several German armored vehicles and suppressing firing positions, enabling the creation of a bridgehead. He was discharged in 1945 and returned to Tovuz, becoming director of an oil depot.

== Early life ==
Sadykhov was born in 1918 in the village of Ağdam to a peasant family. He received secondary education and afterwards worked as a farmhand. In 1938, he was drafted into the Red Army.

== World War II ==
Sadykhov fought in combat from February 1942. He fought on the Voronezh Front. He became a gun commander in the 19th Guards Mechanized Brigade's Artillery Battalion. In 1943, he joined the Communist Party of the Soviet Union. During the summer of 1943 during the Battle of Kursk Sadykhov's battery was attacked by 40 German tanks supported by infantry. Despite being wounded twice, Sadykhov reportedly did not leave the front line and replaced the badly wounded gunner. In this action, his gun reportedly knocked out nine German vehicles, five of which were personally destroyed by Sadykhov. Fire from the gun also reportedly killed hundreds of German soldiers.

During the summer of 1944, Sadykhov fought in Operation Bagration and then the Lublin–Brest Offensive. Around this time, he reportedly captured a German infantry division staff officer. From January 1945, he fought in the Vistula-Oder Offensive. On 16 January 1945, during Soviet efforts to the breakthrough German defenses around the Magnuszew bridgehead in Nowe Miasto nad Pilicą he was reportedly among the first to cross the Pilica. His gun suppressed German firing points, contributing to the formation of the bridgehead. On 18 January, near Zgierz while repulsing counterattacks Sadykhov's gun reportedly knocked out a tank and two armored personnel carriers, as well as killing a group of German soldiers. He was wounded in these battles and returned to the brigade two months later. Sadykhov was awarded the Medal "For Courage" on 21 February. On 15 March, he was awarded the Order of the Red Star.

Sadykhov fought in the Battle of Berlin. On 26 April, 25 tanks and an infantry battalion attacked the positions of his battery. The German troops attempted to break through the encirclement and reach Baruth. In two hours, the battery reportedly destroyed eight tanks and killed over 200 German soldiers. Sadykhov was seriously wounded in the head but reportedly did not leave the battlefield. He received the Medal "For Courage" on 16 May. On 31 May, he was awarded the title Hero of the Soviet Union and the Order of Lenin.

== Postwar ==
In 1945, Sadykhov was discharged. He returned to Tovuz and became director of an oil depot. He died on 11 November 1971 and was buried in Agdam.

A street in Tovuz is named for Sadykhov. A bust of him was erected in the village of Bozargan in Tovuz District.
