= Ruben Sanamyan =

Armenian military personnel

National Hero of Armenia Ruben Sanamyan
- Ռուբեն Սանամյան
- Born: 22 September 1976 (age 50); Dilijan, Armenian SSR, USSR
- Military career
- Allegiance: Armenian Armed Forces
- Conflicts: 2020 Armenian–Azerbaijani clashes
- Awards: National Hero of Armenia

Ruben Razmiki Sanamyan (Armenian: Ռուբեն Ռազմիկի Սանամյան; born 22 September 1976) is an Armenian military officer, Captain of the Armenian Armed Forces, and National Hero of Armenia.

== Military service ==
Ruben completed the compulsory military service in 1995-1997 and joined the Armenian Armed Forces as contract serviceman in 2006.

=== 2020 Armenian-Azerbaijani clashes ===
Ruben Sanamyan took part in the July 2020 Armenian–Azerbaijani clashes. As a commander, he "accurately analyzed the enemy’s actions, assessed the situation, predicted possible developments, and kept the Anvakh combat position invincible through joint efforts with the position’s personnel."

According to Armenian sources, Sanamyan organized suspension of the multiple attacks in the direction of the “Anvakh” (Fearless) military post and made the adversary suffer significant casualties in terms of living force, arms and military equipment. Sanamyan and his group’s fighters carried out complicated engineering works near the military post and procured "valuable documents, weapons, ammunition, several technical means and other data through intelligence operations".

== Awards and honors ==
On 21 August 2020, the president Armen Sarkissian has signed a decree to award the title of National Hero of Armenia to Ruben Sanamyan. He has been also awarded an Order of the Fatherland.

== Family ==
He is married and has two children.
