= Mormor =

- Municipality
- Location within Azerbaijan
- Coordinates: 40°36′47″N 45°28′41″E
- Country: Azerbaijan
- Rayon: Gadabay

Population
  - Total: 1,018
- Time zone: UTC+4 (AZT)
  - Summer (DST): UTC+5 (AZT)

Mormor is a village and municipality in the Gadabay Rayon of Azerbaijan. It has a population of 1,018. The municipality consists of the villages of Mormor and Zamanlı.
