= Border incident =

A border incident, also known as cross-border incident, is an event at a border, often in the form of armed clashes.

== See also ==
- List of border conflicts
