= Vahidli =

- Municipality
- Location within Azerbaijan
- Coordinates: 40°55′51″N 45°35′26″E
- Country: Azerbaijan
- Rayon: Tovuz

Population
  - Total: 1,074
- Time zone: UTC+4 (AZT)
  - Summer (DST): UTC+5 (AZT)

Vahidli (also, Vaitly and Vayytly) is a village and municipality in the Tovuz Rayon of Azerbaijan. It has a population of 1,074.
