= Zamanlı =

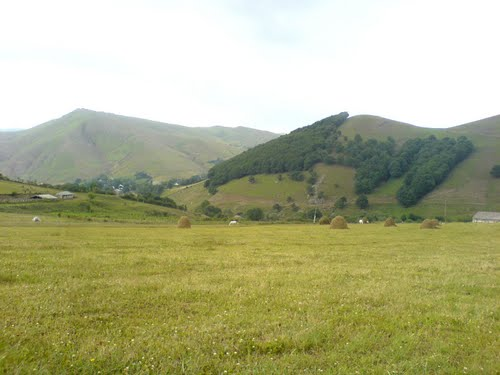

- Location within Azerbaijan
- Coordinates: 40°39′18″N 45°25′44″E
- Country: Azerbaijan
- Rayon: Gadabay
- Municipality: Mormor
- Time zone: UTC+4 (AZT)
  - Summer (DST): UTC+5 (AZT)

Zamanlı (also, Zamanly) is a village in the Gadabay Rayon of Azerbaijan. The village forms part of the municipality of Mormor.
