= Dondar Quşçu =

Dondar Gushchu
- Municipality
- Azerbaijani: Dondar Quşçu
- Location within Azerbaijan
- Coordinates: 40°57′17″N 45°38′38″E
- Country: Azerbaijan
- District: Tovuz

Population
  - Total: 3,482
- Time zone: UTC+4 (AZT)
  - Summer (DST): UTC+5 (AZT)

Dondar Quşçu (also, Dondar Gushchu) is a village and municipality in the Tovuz District of Azerbaijan. It has a population of 3,482.
