= Pirili, Agstafa =

Pirili
- Municipality
- Location within Azerbaijan
- Coordinates: 41°12′36″N 45°23′19″E
- Country: Azerbaijan
- Rayon: Agstafa

Population
  - Total: 2,112
- Time zone: UTC+4 (AZT)
  - Summer (DST): UTC+5 (AZT)

Pirili is a village and municipality in the Agstafa Rayon of Azerbaijan. It has a population of 2,112. The municipality consists of the villages of Pirili and Kolxəlfəli.
