= Kolxəlfəli =

- Location within Azerbaijan
- Coordinates: 41°12′19″N 45°25′30″E
- Country: Azerbaijan
- Rayon: Agstafa
- Municipality: Pirili
- Elevation: 252 m (827 ft)
- Time zone: UTC+4 (AZT)
  - Summer (DST): UTC+5 (AZT)

Kolxəlfəli (also, Këlkhalfali and Kel-Khalfaly) is a village in the Agstafa Rayon of Azerbaijan. The village forms part of the municipality of Pirili.
