= Ağdamkənd =

Aghdamkend
- Azerbaijani: Ağdamkənd
- Location within Azerbaijan
- Coordinates: 40°00′N 46°58′E
- Country: Azerbaijan
- District: Agdam
- Time zone: UTC+4 (AZT)

Ağdamkənd (Aghdamkend) is a village in the Agdam District of Azerbaijan.

== History ==
The village was located in the Armenian-occupied territories surrounding Nagorno-Karabakh, coming under the occupation of ethnic Armenian forces during the First Nagorno-Karabakh War.

The town subsequently was declared part of the self-proclaimed Republic of Artsakh as part of its Martakert Province.

It was returned to Azerbaijan as part of the 2020 Nagorno-Karabakh ceasefire agreement.
