= Pirili, Kurdamir =

Pirili
- Municipality
- Location within Azerbaijan
- Coordinates: 40°10′55″N 48°15′03″E
- Country: Azerbaijan
- Rayon: Kurdamir
- Time zone: UTC+4 (AZT)
  - Summer (DST): UTC+5 (AZT)

Pirili is a village and municipality in the Kurdamir Rayon of Azerbaijan.
