= Movses, Armenia =

Movses Մովսես
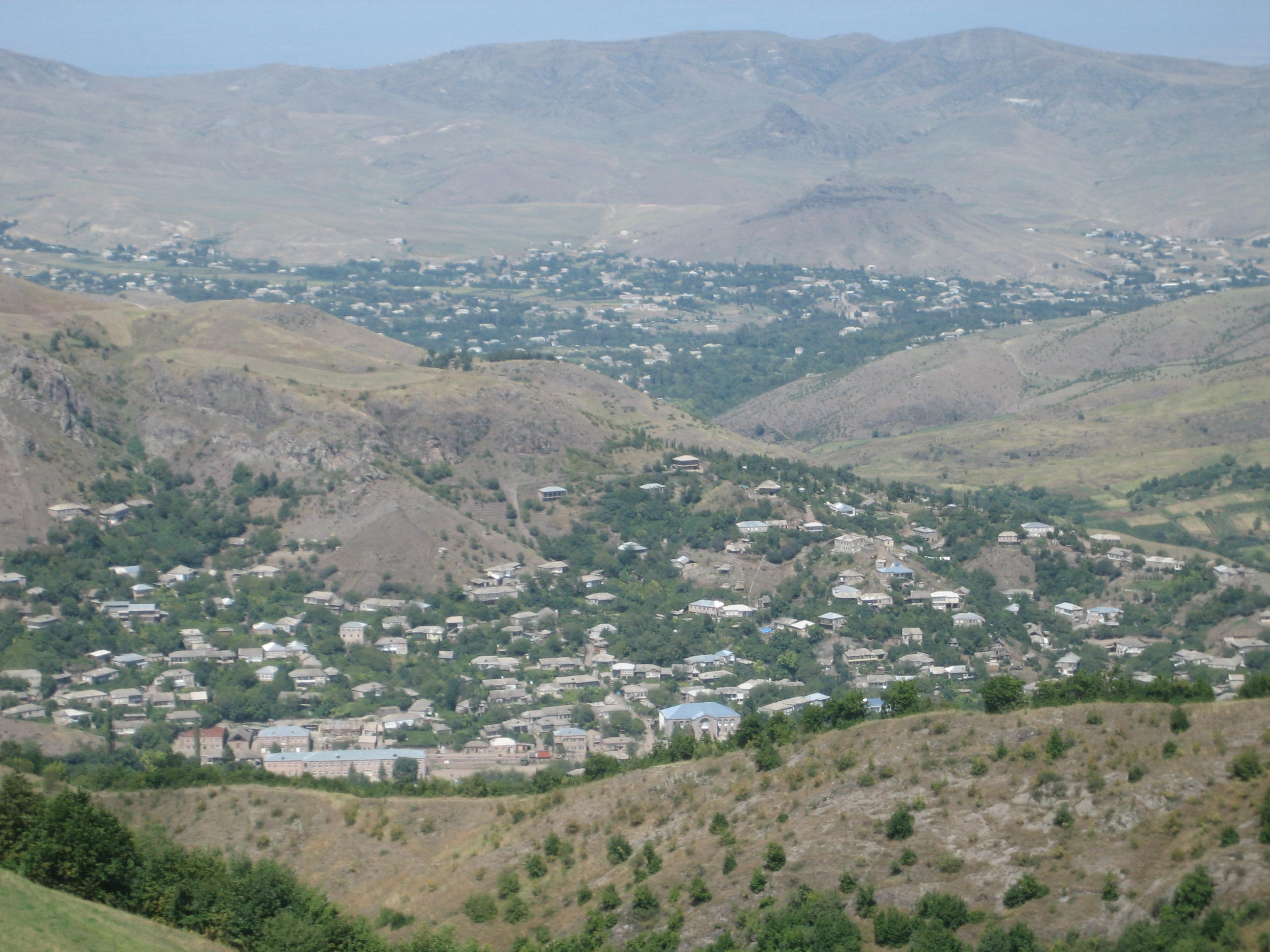
- A view of Movses

- Location within Armenia Location within Tavush
- Coordinates: 40°54′23″N 45°29′29″E
- Country: Armenia
- Province: Tavush
- Municipality: Berd

Population (2011)
  - Total: 1,748
- Time zone: UTC+4 (AMT)
- Website: Official website

Movses (Armenian: Մովսես) is a village in the Berd Municipality of the Tavush Province of Armenia.

== Etymology ==
The village is also known as Mosesgegh (Մոսեսգեղ) and Movsesgyugh (Մովսեսգյուղ).

== Gallery ==
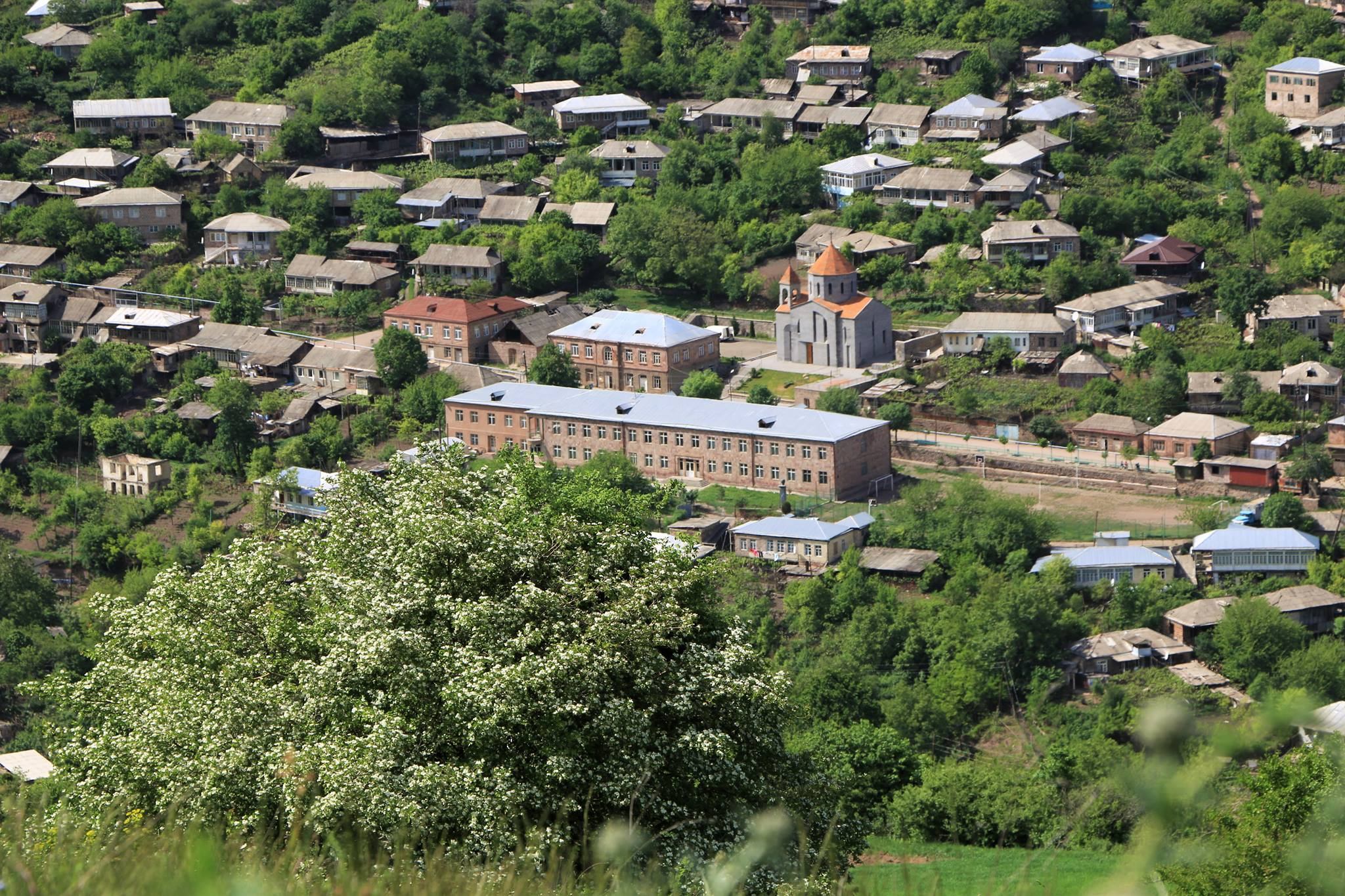
A view of Movses

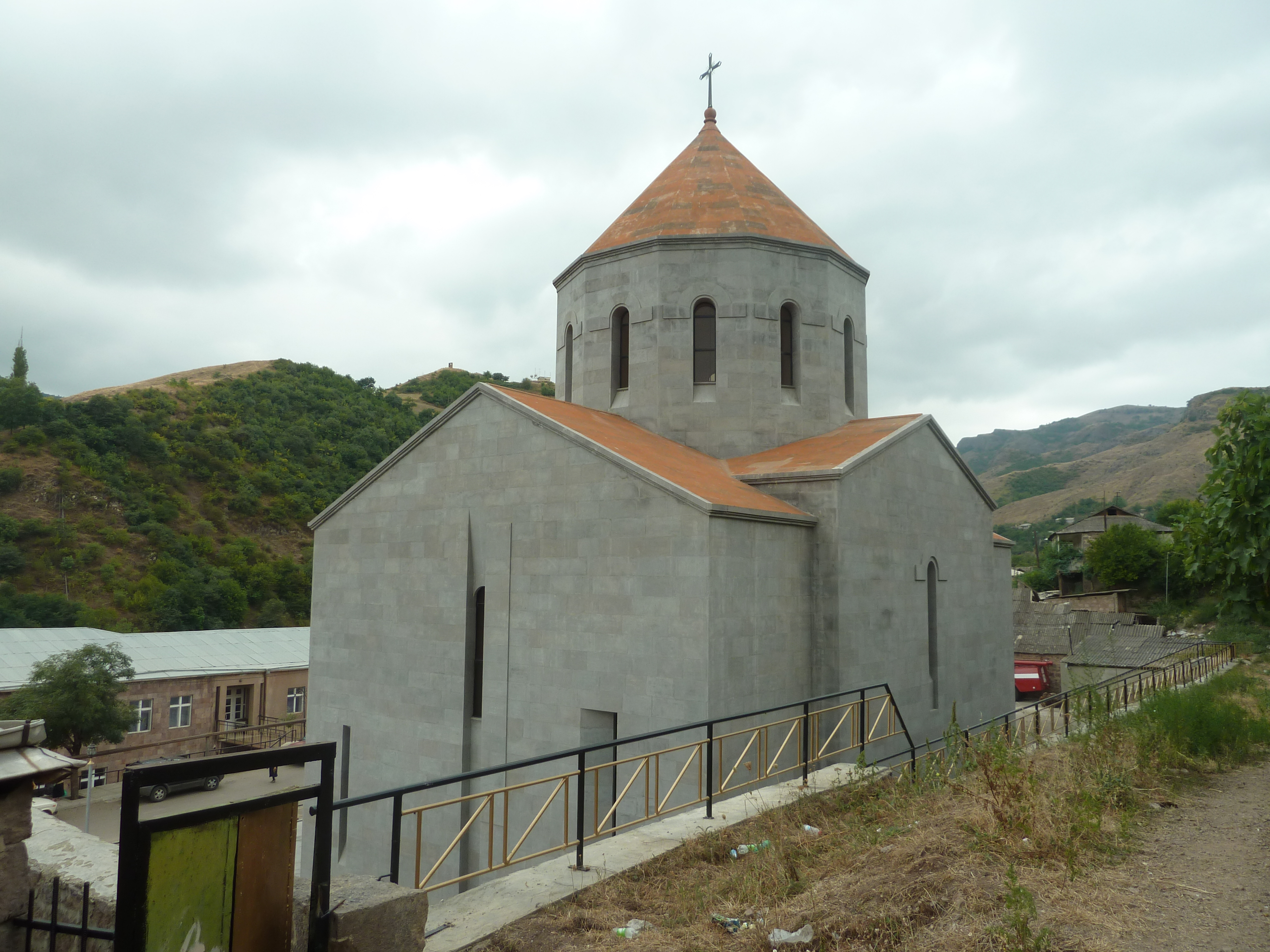
Holy Mother of God Church

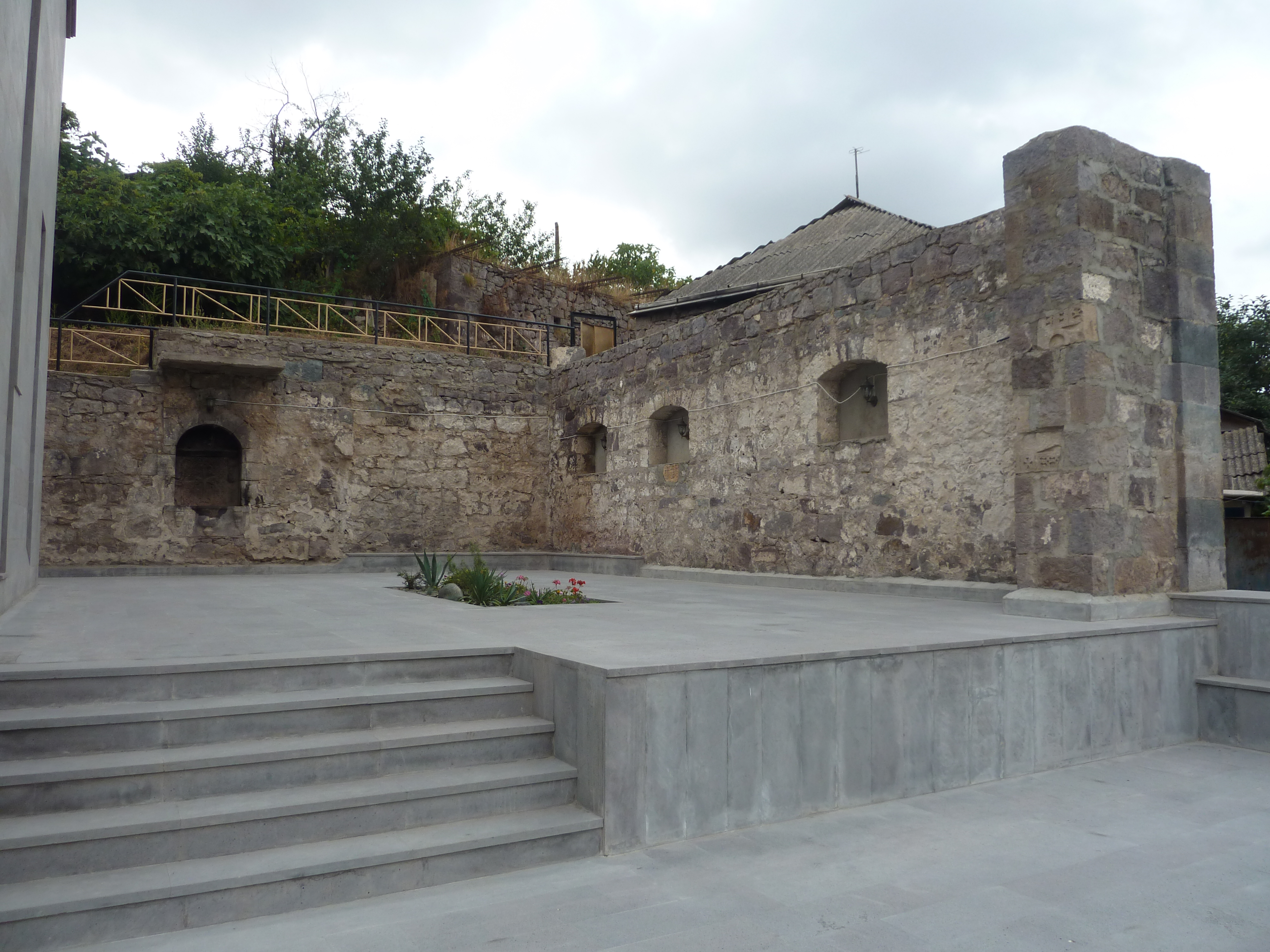
St. Astvatsatsin Church

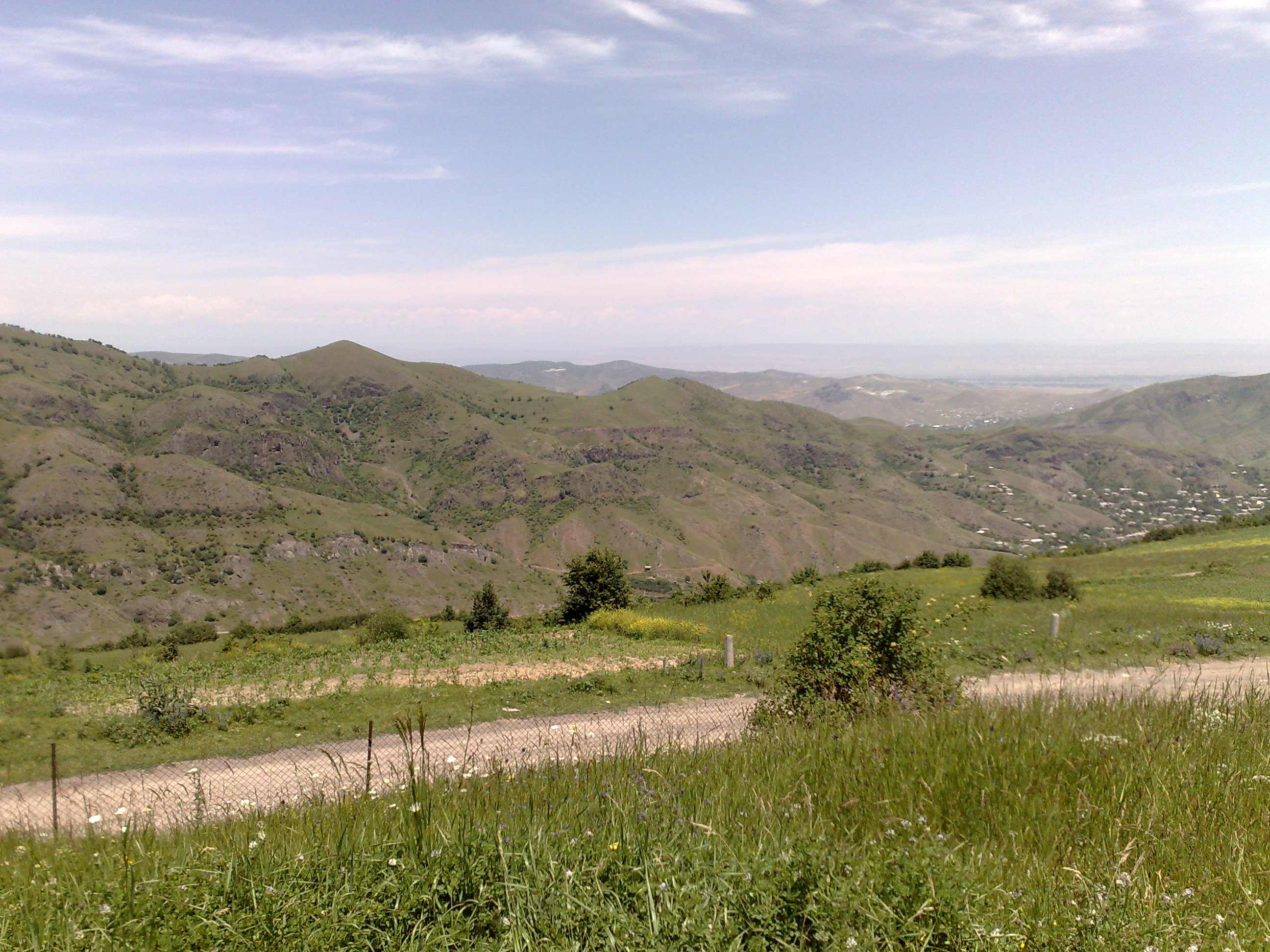
Scenery around Movses
