= Chinari, Armenia =

Chinari Չինարի
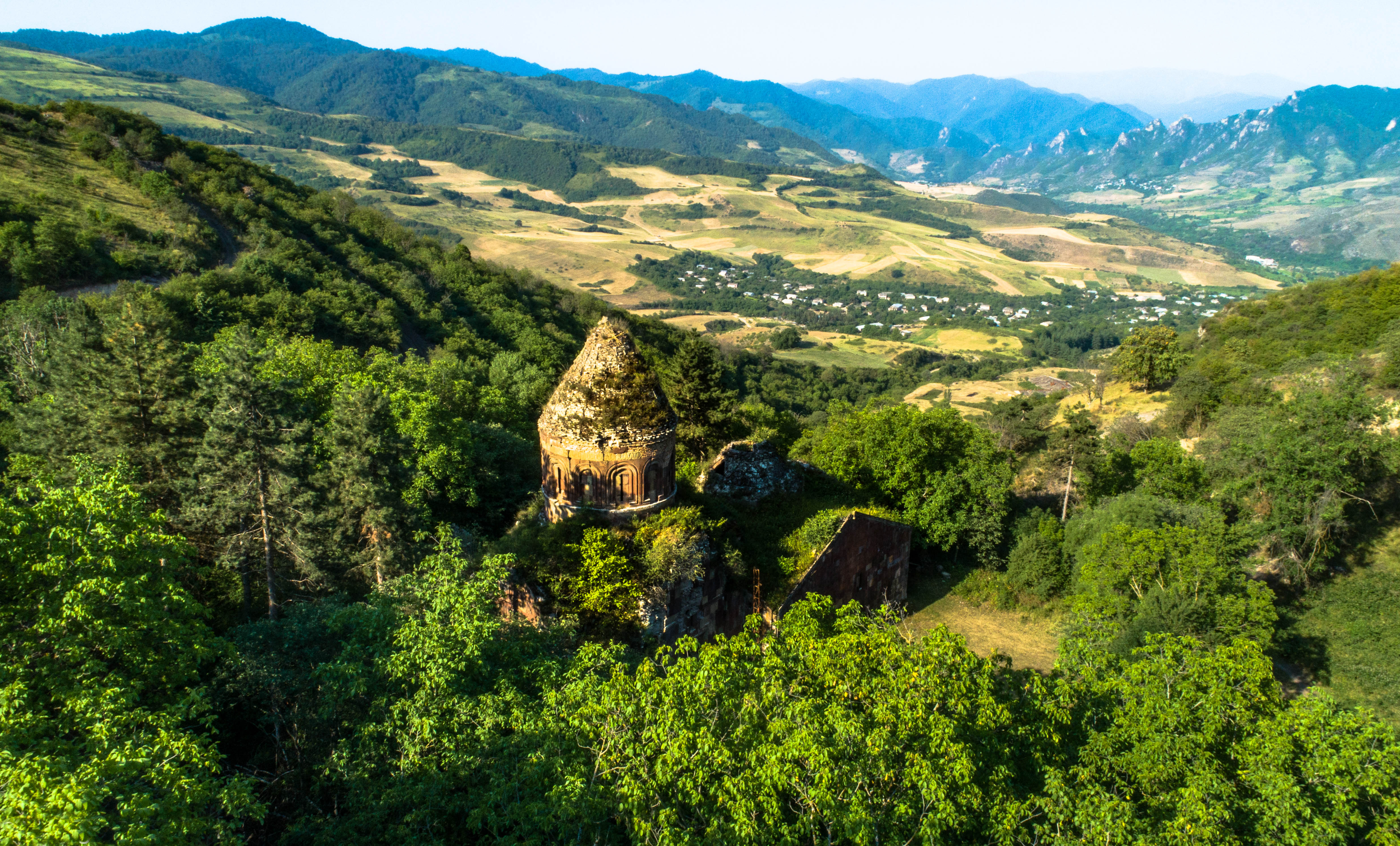
- A view of Chinari and Khoranashat Monastery

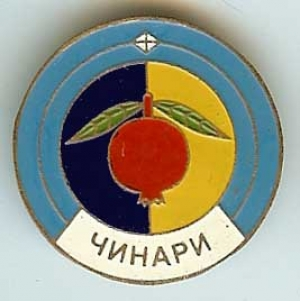
- Coat of arms

- Location within Armenia Location within Tavush
- Coordinates: 40°50′59″N 45°34′19″E
- Country: Armenia
- Province: Tavush
- Municipality: Berd
- Elevation: 750 m (2,460 ft)

Population (2011)
  - Total: 887
- Time zone: UTC+4 (AMT)

Chinari (Armenian: Չինարի) is a village in the Berd Municipality of the Tavush Province of Armenia. Chinari lies very close to the Armenia–Azerbaijan border, and is the village closest to the abandoned Khoranashat monastery, which lies on a hill northeast of the town, only feet away from the border.

== Gallery ==
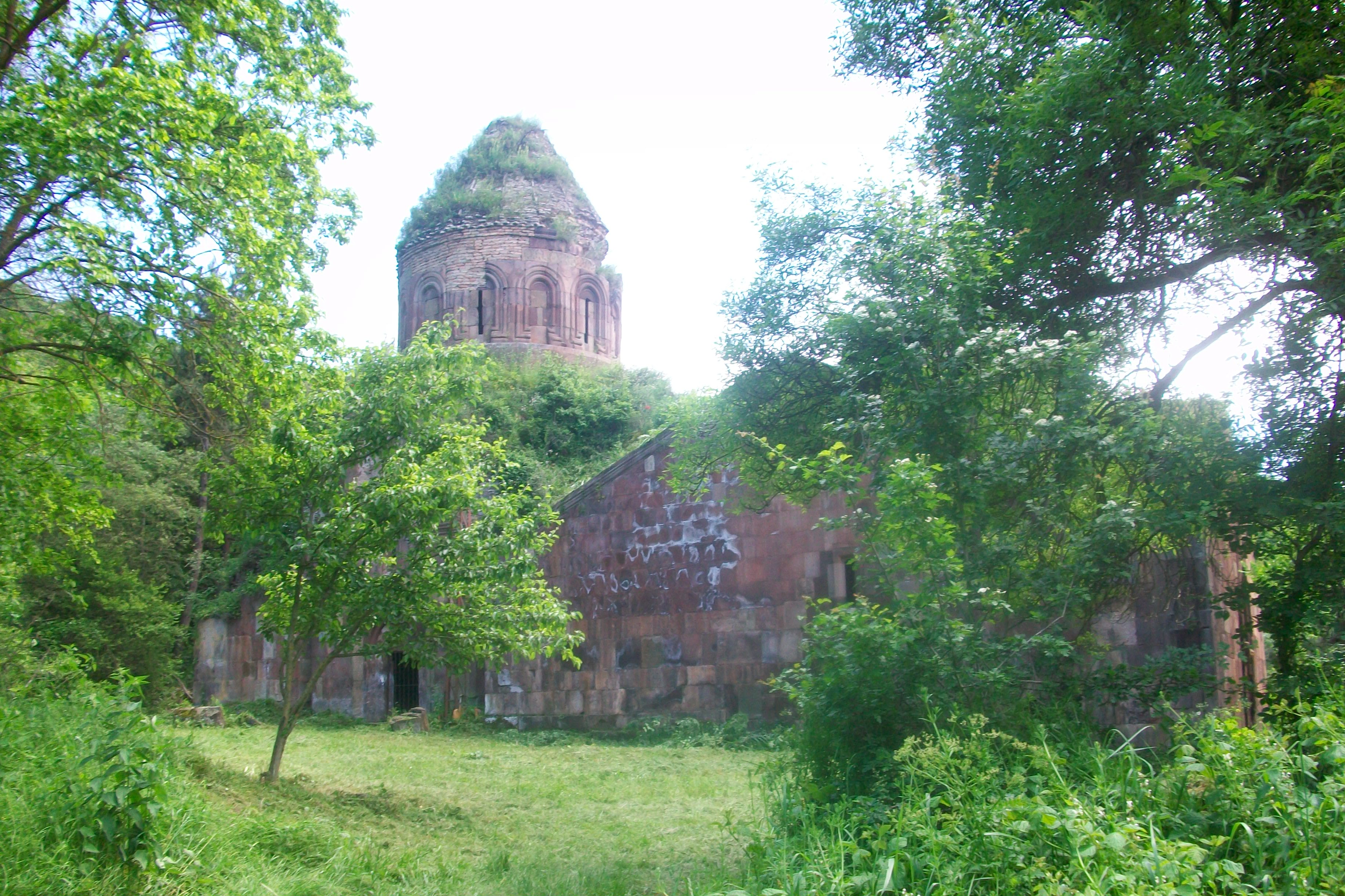
Khoranashat Monastery

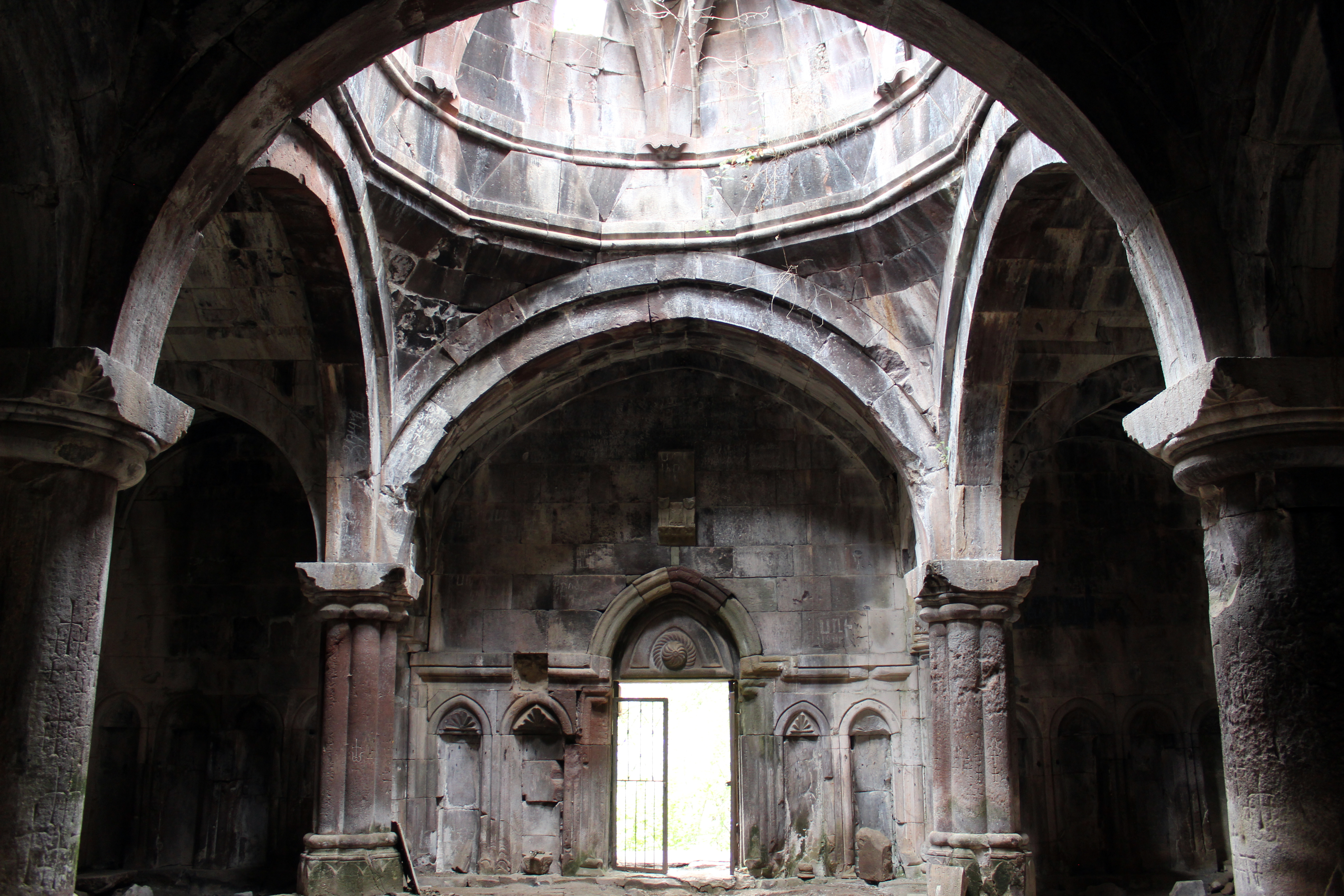
Khoranashat Monastery interior

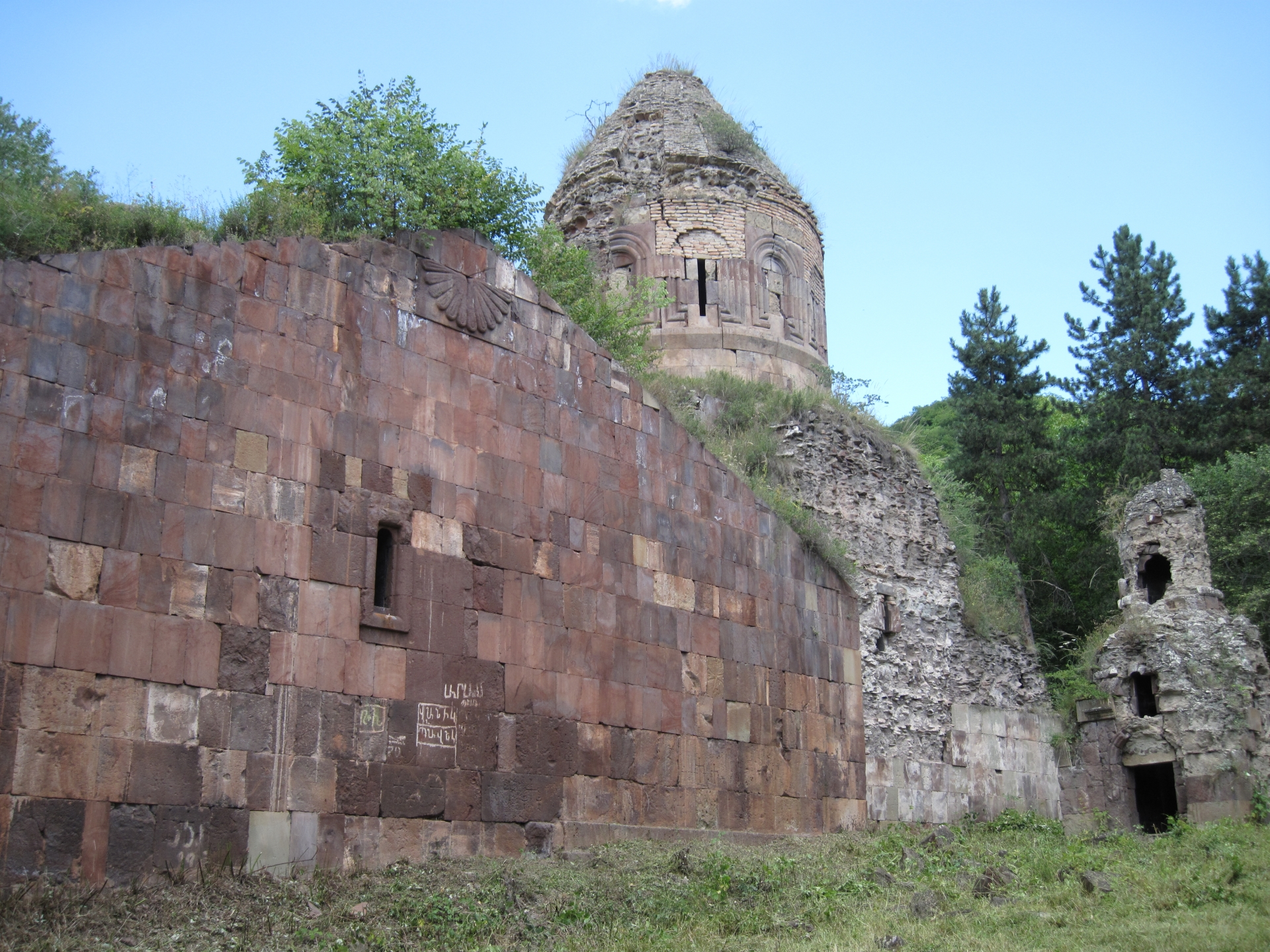
Khoranashat Monastery
