= Mazahir Afandiyev =

Azerbaijani politician

Mazahir Afandiyev Member of the National Assembly of Azerbaijan

Member of the [[Azerbaijan Parliament]] for Agdash-Goychay
- Incumbent
- Assumed office 2020
- Preceded by: new constituency

Personal details
- Born: Mazahir Javid oglu Afandiyev; 1 February 1976 (age 50) Agdash District, Azerbaijan SSR
- Party: Independent
- Education: Academy of Public Administration

Mazahir Javid oglu Afandiyev (Azerbaijani: Məzahir Cavid oğlu Əfəndiyev, born 1 February 1976, Agdash District, Azerbaijan SSR) is a Member of the National Assembly of Azerbaijan.

== Life ==
Mazahir Afandiyev was born on February 1, 1976, in the Agdash region. In 1982 he started the first grade of the secondary school No. 4 named after M. Gorky in the Agdash region, and in 1992 he graduated from this school with honors. During his studies in secondary school, he was the chairman of the All-Union Youth Organization (KOMSOMOL) school support and was awarded the title of champion of the zonal Olympiad in history. In 1994 he enrolled in full-time education in the school of State and Municipal Administration of the Baku State Institute of Goods and Trade. In 1996, he was transferred to the Academy of Public Administration Under the President of the Republic of Azerbaijan and continued his studies in the same specialty. He graduated from the same institute in 1999 with a degree in State and Municipal Administration.

In 1999, he was admitted to the Academy of Public Administration under the President of the Republic of Azerbaijan to obtain a master's degree in Organization and Management of Education, and in 2001 he graduated with honors. He also attended management courses at the University of Cambridge in the UK in 2007 He is a Ph.D. in Sustainable Development Management at the Academy of Public Administration under the President of the Republic of Azerbaijan and teaches at the Academy of Master's Degree on Sustainable Development in Regions. He served in the army on January 7, 1998, and after his release, he held various positions in the divisions of the UN Office in Azerbaijan from 1999 to 2019.

== Awards ==
- For his active participation in the youth movement in 2002–2006, he was awarded various honorary decrees of the Ministry of Youth and Sports of the Republic of Azerbaijan, the title of Honorary Youth.
- Sign of the State Customs Committee "For strengthening customs cooperation" 2006,
- In accordance with the Order of the President of the Republic of Azerbaijan No. 643 dated October 21, 2015, on the occasion of the 70th anniversary of the UN, the "Progress" medal was awarded for effective work on the implementation of UN projects in various fields in Azerbaijan.
- December 15, 2015, Medal of the Ministry of Emergency Situations on behalf of the President of the Republic of Azerbaijan. 2017 Medal of the State Border Service for "services to military cooperation".
- In 2019, he was awarded the “100th Anniversary” medal of the Armed Forces of Azerbaijan.
