= Koxanəbi =

- Municipality
- Location within Azerbaijan
- Coordinates: 40°52′13″N 45°36′33″E
- Country: Azerbaijan
- Rayon: Tovuz

Population
  - Total: 235
- Time zone: UTC+4 (AZT)
  - Summer (DST): UTC+5 (AZT)

Koxanəbi (also, Koxa Nəbi and Këkhanabi) is a village and municipality in the Tovuz Rayon of Azerbaijan. It has a population of 235.
