= Ağdam, Tovuz =

Ağdam
- Municipality
- Location within Azerbaijan
- Coordinates: 40°54′19″N 45°33′23″E
- Country: Azerbaijan
- District: Tovuz

Population
  - Total: 1,155
- Time zone: UTC+4 (AZT)
  - Summer (DST): UTC+5 (AZT)

Ağdam (Aghdam) is a village and municipality in the Tovuz District of Azerbaijan. It has a population of 1,155.

== Notable natives ==
- Yusif Sadykhov — Hero of the Soviet Union.
- Naig Yusifov — National Hero of Azerbaijan.
