= 2012 Armenian–Azerbaijani border clashes =

2012 skirmishes between Armenia and Azerbaijan

2012 Armenian-Azeri border clashes
- Part of Nagorno-Karabakh conflict
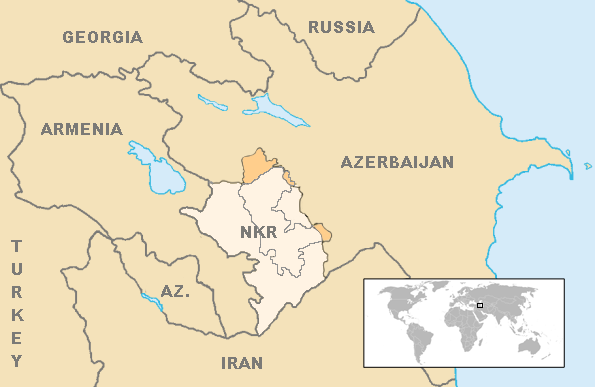
- Territory controlled by the Nagorno-Karabakh Republic Claimed by the Nagorno-Karabakh Republic but controlled by Azerbaijan
| Date | 25 April – 7 June 2012 (1 month, 1 week and 3 days) |
| Location | Armenian–Azeri border and line of contact, Nagorno-Karabakh, Azerbaijan |

Belligerents
| Armenia; Nagorno-Karabakh | Azerbaijan |

Commanders and leaders
| (Armenia) Serzh Sargsyan (Republic of Artsakh) Bako Sahakyan | (Azerbaijan) Ilham Aliyev |

Casualties and losses
| (Armenia) 3 soldiers killed, 6 wounded (Republic of Artsakh) 1 soldier killed, 2 wounded | (Azerbaijan) 5 soldiers killed Several wounded |

The 2012 border clashes between the armed forces of Armenia and Azerbaijan took place in early June. The clashes resulted in casualties on both sides.

== Background ==
The two countries fought a war in the early 1990s over the enclave of Nagorno-Karabakh, while tensions have recently escalated. Since the beginning of 2011, 63 people have been killed in skirmishes between Armenia and Azerbaijan.

The most recent tensions have been concentrated along the section of the Armenia-Azerbaijan border that runs between Tavush Province and Qazakh Rayon and started in April with cross-border firing on unknown origin.

Previously, it had been noted that Azerbaijan was increasing its defense spending with the goal of ending occupation of Nagorno-Karabakh following a US$1.6 billion purchase of military equipment from Israel after it had been largely kept out of other arms markets with the Armenia-Russia relations and Armenia-United States relations hampering their efforts to acquire arms.

On June 2, in response to the reported wounding of a Nerkin Karmirarghbyur resident by gunfire from Azerbaijan hours after a scheduled OSCE monitoring visit, OSCE monitoring officials conducted a unilateral field monitoring mission in the Tavush region to investigate recent incidents along the line of contact at the villages of Aygepar, Moses and Nerkin Karmiraghbyur, and make photographic and video records of the traces of the shelling.

== Events ==
The first clashes occurred early on June 4, in which three Armenian soldiers were killed and six wounded near the villages of Berdavan and Chinari in Tavush Province. An Armenian Defense Ministry statement issued the same day said the soldiers had died while fighting back a cross-border incursion by Azerbaijani forces into the northern Tavush region during which "the enemy was repelled, suffering casualties."

The following day, four Azerbaijani soldiers were killed near Asagi Askipara, in the Qazakh Rayon of western Azerbaijan. An Armenian Defense Ministry statement said they had been part of a unit of 15 to 20 soldiers who had tried to infiltrate Armenian positions in the vicinity of Voskepar village in Tavish province. A separate shooting killed a fifth Azerbaijani soldier in the same district.

Initially, Azerbaijan refuted allegations of gunfire at the border or any Azerbaijani deaths and explained the incident involving deaths of three Armenian soldiers as a result of "internal disagreements within the Armenian army." Azerbaijan's Defence Ministry later confirmed that the June 5 skirmish had taken place and had resulted in the death of five Azerbaijani soldiers, four of whom died during the confrontation, with a fifth killed later, shot from a distant position. Azerbaijan said that the fighting took place as a result of a subversive group from Armenia trying to penetrate into Azerbaijani territory at the village of Asagi Askipara.

On June 6, according to Nagorno Karabakh's Defence Ministry, Azeri soldiers attempted to infiltrate into Nagorno-Karabakh, near Horadiz. One Karabakhi soldier was killed and two others were wounded. Panorama reported shooting from the Azeri side the next day.

== Reaction ==
At the start of the incidents, U.S. Secretary of State Hillary Clinton was in Armenia as part of a visit to the three southern Caucasus states. Both sides accused each other of a military diversion timed to coincide with her visit to the Caucasus. In Armenia, on June 4 and after hearing of the June 4 deaths, Clinton stated at a press conference that "I am very concerned about the danger of escalation of tensions and the senseless deaths of young soldiers and innocent civilians. The use of force will not resolve the Nagorno-Karabakh conflict and therefore force must not be used." She said that she had told President Serzh Sarkisian she would make those points in Baku when there. At the same press conference, Armenia's Foreign Minister Edward Nalbandian stated "Azerbaijan is not satisfied by the fact that every day there are violations by Azerbaijanis on the line of contact of Azerbaijan and Nagorno-Karabakh. They are trying to transfer the tension, to escalate the situation onto the border between Armenia and Azerbaijan which greatly undermines the negotiation process, as well as threatens the regional stability. The responsibility for all possible consequences of such activities lies on the Azeri side."

On June 6, after talks with Azerbaijani President Ilham Aliyev in Baku, Clinton said that "the cycle of violence and retaliation must end."

The U.S., Russian and French diplomats co-chairing the OSCE Minsk Group commented saying;

Such senseless acts violate the commitment of the parties to refrain from the use of force and to seek a peaceful settlement of the Nagorno-Karabakh conflict, and contradict the spirit of the January 23, 2012, joint statement of Presidents [Ilham] Aliyev, Sarkisian, and [Dmitry] Medvedev.

=== Media ===
Speaking about why international bodies did not make statements "naming and shaming" whichever side started the violence, Thomas de Waal explained that there was no way for them to know due to the small number (six) of OSCE monitors in the field, and 20,000 soldiers on both sides.

The Armenia media suggested that Azerbaijan's aim is to increase tension along the border so that Azerbaijan can accuse the OSCE Minsk Group of an inability to control the situation and guarantee peace. Azerbaijan would then attempt to transfer the Karabakh issue from the OSCE to the United Nations because that organisation has recognized Azerbaijan's territorial integrity within its Soviet-drawn borders. Also, in 2012 Azerbaijan assumed non-permanent membership of the UN Security Council.
