= Parakənd =

Parakənd may refer to:

- Parakənd, Gadabay, Azerbaijan
- Parakənd, Lankaran, Azerbaijan
