= Yaqublu =

Yaqublu or Yagublu may refer to:

- Gugark, Armenia
- Yaqublu, Gadabay, Azerbaijan
- Yaqublu, Oghuz, Azerbaijan
