= Köhnəkənd =

Köhnəkənd or Kyohnak’end or Këgnakend or Këkhnekend may refer to:

- Köhnəkənd, Gadabay, Azerbaijan
- Köhnəkənd, Lachin, Azerbaijan
