= Qurudərə =

Qurudərə or Kurudere is a Turkic word meaning "dry creek" and may refer to:

- Kurudere, Bismil
- Kurudere, Buldan
- Kurudere, Dicle
- Kurudere, Kulp
- Kurudere, Mersin, Turkey
- Kurudere, Pınarhisar, Turkey
- Kurudere, Şavşat, Turkey
- Kurudere, Savaştepe, Turkey
- Mousoulita, Northern Cyprus, whose Turkish name is Kurudere
- Qurudərə, Gadabay, Azerbaijan
