= Turşsu =

Turşsu may refer to:

- Turşsu, Gadabay, Azerbaijan
- Turşsu, Lachin, Azerbaijan
- Turşsu, Shusha, Azerbaijan
