= Qızılqaya, Gadabay =

Gyzylgaya
- Azerbaijani: Qızılqaya
- Location within Azerbaijan
- Coordinates: 40°34′21″N 45°35′28″E
- Country: Azerbaijan
- District: Gadabay
- Municipality: Çobankənd
- Time zone: UTC+4 (AZT)
  - Summer (DST): UTC+5 (AZT)

Qızılqaya (also, Gyzylgaya; known as Yenikend until 2015) is a village in the Gadabay District of Azerbaijan. The village forms part of the municipality of Çobankənd.
