= Çaykənd, Gadabay =

Village in Azerbaijan

Coordinates: 40.609444°N 45.723611°E

Çaykənd (also, Chaykend; known as Gasimaghaly until 2015) is a village in the municipality of Şəkərbəy in the Gadabay District of Azerbaijan.
