= Heydərli =

Human settlement in Azerbaijan

Coordinates: 40°36′N 45°42′E

Heydərli (also Heydarlı) is a village in the municipality of Şəkərbəy in the Gadabay Rayon of Azerbaijan.
