= Karen Hekimyan =

Armenian politician

- Կարեն Հեքիմյան
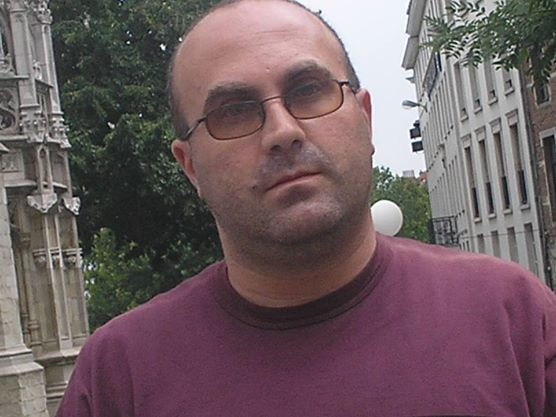
- Born: September 11, 1970 (age 55); Yerevan, Armenian SSR, Soviet Union

Karen Hekimyan (Armenian: Կարեն Հեքիմյան) public figure, Chairman of the NGO "Citizens Rights Protector", Chemist, Chairman of the Conservative Party.

== Biography ==
He was born on September 11, 1970, in Yerevan. Graduated from the faculty of Chemical Technologies of the State Engineering University of Armenian (SEUA). He got his second specialization of a lawyer in the Mesrop Mashtots University. Karen Hekimyan passed his post graduate study in the Institute of General and Inorganic Chemistry of the Armenian National Academy of Sciences. Worked at Mnjoyan Fine Organic Chemistry Institute, in the SEUA . He is a co-author for a number of scientific articles in the field of fine organic synthesis. He is married, has a two daughters.

== Political activity ==
In 1988 he participated in the all-national movement, actively collaborated with the Union "Mashtots", in 1990 he was elected a deputy of the Shengavit Regional Council. In 1991 he worked with the newspaper "Independence". In 1991 and in 1993 having significant advantages he was nominated MP candidate in the election districts 31 and 36 of the Supreme Council by the Conservative Party of Armenia. In 1992 he led the election campaign of the former political prisoner Hakobjan Tadevosyan. In 1995 he was elected the Chairman of the RA NA 2nd electoral district of electoral commission (the only district that was not monitored by the government). In the presidential elections of 1996 he was the proxy of Vazgen Manoukian, and in 2008 a proxy of Levon Ter-Petrosyan. He also conducted an observation mission and headed electoral commissions during the elections of 1998, 1999, 2008 and 2013. In 2007 in NA elections was nominated an MP candidate by the proportional list of "Impeachment" alliance. In 2008 was twice apprehended to police for participating in the national movement rallies and demonstrations. He is recognized as politically persecuted.

== Public activity ==
From the 1990s he undertook public activities, then legal protection as well. He has won a number of court trials against a number of RA administrative bodies protecting citizens rights and interests. In 2008 and 2014 he accused the Human Rights Defender and the ministry of foreign affairs of inactivity moving the dispute to the court. In 2012 he organized a number of demonstrations demanding to reinstate Artsvashen on the RA map. After his organized demonstrations against the partial, unjust, illegal activity of the Embassy of the Republic of Lithuania in Armenia the activity of the embassy, Armenia-Lithuania relationships were significantly improved, as a result a friendship group Lithuania-Artsakh was established, the activity of the Embassy of the Republic of Lithuania in Armenia became legalized consistent with the international law, the employees of the Embassy of the Republic of Lithuania began to speak Armenian as well with the RA citizens. Presented programs stating the fact of exile and murder of hundreds of officers and politicians in 1920–1921, which still has no legal assessment.

== Links ==
- Electronic Register, Government of Armenia
