= Əmiraslanlı =

Human settlement in Azerbaijan

- Village
- Location in Azerbaijan
- Coordinates: 40°35′N 45°43′E
- Country: Azerbaijan
- Rayon: Gadabay
- Municipality: Şəkərbəy

Əmiraslanlı is a village in the municipality of Şəkərbəy in the Gadabay Rayon of Azerbaijan.
