= Pərizamanlı =

Coordinates: 40°46′N 45°44′E

Pərizamanlı (also, Pərzamanlı) is a village and the least populous municipality in the Gadabay Rayon of Azerbaijan. It has a population of 667.
