= Şəkərbəy =

- Municipality
- Location within Azerbaijan
- Coordinates: 40°36′34″N 45°43′25″E
- Country: Azerbaijan
- District: Gadabay

Population
  - Total: 3,012
- Time zone: UTC+4 (AZT)
  - Summer (DST): UTC+5 (AZT)

Şəkərbəy (also, Shekerbey and Shekerbeyli) is a village and municipality in the Gadabay District of Azerbaijan. It has a population of 3,012. The municipality consists of the villages of Şəkərbəy, Heydərli, Sarıhəsənli, Gödəkdərə, Çaykənd, Əmiraslanlı, and Yaqublu.
