= Qaravultomba =

- Location within Azerbaijan
- Coordinates: 40°32′N 45°42′E
- Country: Azerbaijan
- Rayon: Gadabay
- Municipality: Parakənd
- Time zone: UTC+4 (AZT)
  - Summer (DST): UTC+5 (AZT)

Qaravultomba (also, Karaultomba and Karovultomba) is a village in the Gadabay Rayon of Azerbaijan. The village forms part of the municipality of Parakənd.
