= Çobankənd =

- Municipality
- Location within Azerbaijan
- Coordinates: 40°34′23″N 45°34′25″E
- Country: Azerbaijan
- Rayon: Gadabay

Population
  - Total: 1,802
- Time zone: UTC+4 (AZT)
  - Summer (DST): UTC+5 (AZT)
- Area code: 232

Çobankənd (also, Chobankend) is a village and municipality in the Gadabay Rayon of Azerbaijan. It has a population of 1,802. The municipality consists of the villages of Çobankənd and Yenikənd.
