= Nerkin Chambarak =

Former village in Gegharkunik, Armenia

Nerkin-Chambarak Ներքին Ճամբարակ
- Location within Armenia Location within Gegharkunik
- Coordinates: 40°37′29″N 45°19′48″E
- Country: Armenia
- Province: Gegharkunik
- Municipality: Chambarak
- Time zone: UTC+4

Nerkin Chambarak or Nizhny Chambarak (Armenian: Ներքին Ճամբարակ) was a village in the Gegharkunik Province of Armenia, currently part of the town of Chambarak.

== See also ==
- Gegharkunik Province
