= Bəydəmirli =

Village in Gadabay District, Azerbaijan

Coordinates: 40°41′N 45°28′E

Bəydəmirli (also, Beydemirli) is a village in the municipality of Çay Rəsullu in the Gadabay District of Azerbaijan.
