= Alican (disambiguation) =

Alican may refer to:

== Given name ==
- Alican Güney (born 1989), Turkish basketball player
- Alican Karataş, Turkish curler
- Alican Kaynar (born 1988), Turkish yacht racer

== Surname ==
- Ekrem Alican (1916-2000), Turkish politician

== Places ==
- Alıcan (also, Alydzhan and Alyjan), a village in the Lachin Rayon of Azerbaijan

== Other uses ==
- MV Karadeniz Powership Alican Bey, Turkish powership
