= Sarıköynək =

- Location within Azerbaijan
- Coordinates: 40°33′N 45°43′E
- Country: Azerbaijan
- Rayon: Gadabay
- Municipality: Dəyirmandağ
- Time zone: UTC+4 (AZT)
  - Summer (DST): UTC+5 (AZT)

Sarıköynək (also, Sarykëynak) is a village in the Gadabay Rayon of Azerbaijan. The village forms part of the municipality of Dəyirmandağ.
