= Kilsəli =

Kilsəli or Kilisali or Kiliselli or Kil’syali may refer to:

- Kilsəli, Gadabay, Azerbaijan
- Kilsəli, Kalbajar, Azerbaijan
