= Arıqıran =

- Municipality
- Location within Azerbaijan
- Coordinates: 40°33′18″N 45°37′03″E
- Country: Azerbaijan
- Rayon: Gadabay

Population
  - Total: 2,659
- Time zone: UTC+4 (AZT)
  - Summer (DST): UTC+5 (AZT)

Arıqıran (also, Anygyran and Arygyran) is a village and municipality in the Gadabay Rayon of Azerbaijan. It has a population of 2,659. The municipality consists of the villages of Arıqıran and Əyrivəng.
