= Gödəkdərə =

- Location within Azerbaijan
- Coordinates: 40°36′N 45°44′E
- Country: Azerbaijan
- Rayon: Gadabay
- Municipality: Şəkərbəy
- Time zone: UTC+4 (AZT)
  - Summer (DST): UTC+5 (AZT)

Gödəkdərə (also, Gëdakdere) is a village in the Gadabay Rayon of Azerbaijan. The village forms part of the municipality of Şəkərbəy.
