= Çay Rəsullu =

- Municipality
- Location within Azerbaijan
- Coordinates: 40°40′48″N 45°27′31″E
- Country: Azerbaijan
- Rayon: Gadabay

Population
  - Total: 1,239
- Time zone: UTC+4 (AZT)
  - Summer (DST): UTC+5 (AZT)

Çay Rəsullu (also, Çayrəsullu, Chay-Rasullu) is a village and municipality in the Gadabay Rayon of Azerbaijan. It has a population of 1,239. The municipality consists of the villages of Çay Rəsullu, Bəydəmirli, Turşsu.
