= Qasımağlı =

- Location within Azerbaijan
- Coordinates: 40°37′15″N 45°27′57″E
- Country: Azerbaijan
- Rayon: Gadabay
- Time zone: UTC+4 (AZT)
  - Summer (DST): UTC+5 (AZT)

Qasımağlı is a village in the Gadabay Rayon of Azerbaijan.
