= Gadzhyalekperli =

Gadzhyalekperli may refer to:

- Dəllər Cırdaxan, Azerbaijan
- Hacıələkbərli, Azerbaijan
