= Arıqdam =

- Municipality
- Location within Azerbaijan
- Coordinates: 40°35′32″N 45°48′04″E
- Country: Azerbaijan
- Rayon: Gadabay

Population
  - Total: 2,200
- Time zone: UTC+4 (AZT)
  - Summer (DST): UTC+5 (AZT)

Arıqdam (also, Arıxdam, Arygdam, and Arykhdam) is a village and municipality in the Gadabay Rayon of Azerbaijan. It has a population of 2,200.
