= Kiçik Düzyürd =

- Location within Azerbaijan
- Coordinates: 40°33′25″N 45°47′52″E
- Country: Azerbaijan
- Rayon: Gadabay
- Time zone: UTC+4 (AZT)
  - Summer (DST): UTC+5 (AZT)

Kiçik Düzyürd (also, Kechik-Dyzyrt and Kichik Dyuzyurd) is a village in the Gadabay Rayon of Azerbaijan.
