= Sarıhəsənli =

Saryhasanli
- Azerbaijani: Sarıhəsənli
- Location within Azerbaijan
- Coordinates: 40°35′N 45°44′E
- Country: Azerbaijan
- District: Gadabay
- Municipality: Şəkərbəy
- Time zone: UTC+4 (AZT)
  - Summer (DST): UTC+5 (AZT)

Sarıhəsənli (also, Saryhasanli) is a village in the Gadabay District of Azerbaijan. The village forms part of the municipality of Şəkərbəy.
