= Qumlu =

- Location within Azerbaijan
- Coordinates: 40°34′50″N 45°50′21″E
- Country: Azerbaijan
- Rayon: Gadabay
- Time zone: UTC+4 (AZT)
  - Summer (DST): UTC+5 (AZT)

Qumlu (also, Kumlu) is a village in the Gadabay Rayon of Azerbaijan.
