= Dəyirmandağ =

- Municipality
- Location within Azerbaijan
- Coordinates: 40°33′59″N 45°41′49″E
- Country: Azerbaijan
- Rayon: Gadabay

Population
  - Total: 3,359
- Time zone: UTC+4 (AZT)
  - Summer (DST): UTC+5 (AZT)

Dəyirmandağ (also, Dagirmandag) is a village and municipality in the Gadabay Rayon of Azerbaijan. It has a population of 3,359. The municipality consists of the villages of Dəyirmandağ, Qurudərə, Köhnəkənd, Hacıələkbərli, and Sarıköynək.
