= Çalburun =

- Municipality
- Location within Azerbaijan
- Coordinates: 40°30′22″N 45°44′28″E
- Country: Azerbaijan
- Rayon: Gadabay

Population
  - Total: 1,800
- Time zone: UTC+4 (AZT)
  - Summer (DST): UTC+5 (AZT)

Çalburun (also, Chalburun) is a village and municipality in the Gadabay Rayon of Azerbaijan. It has a population of 1,800.
