= Getik, Gegharkunik =

Village in Gegharkunik, Armenia

Getik Գետիկ
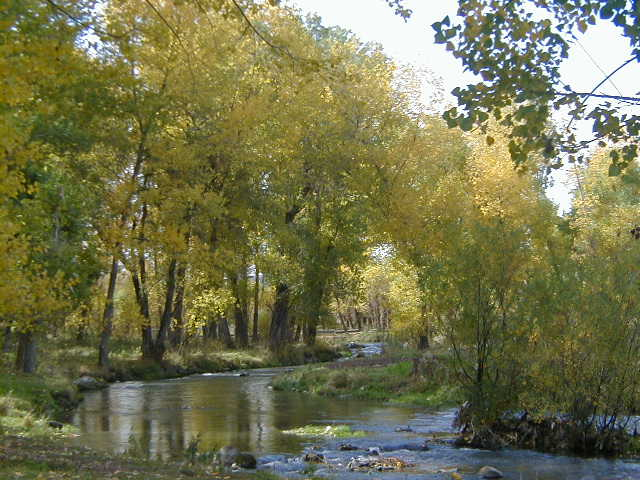
- Nearby Getik State Sanctuary

- Location within Armenia Location within Gegharkunik
- Coordinates: 40°39′44″N 45°16′00″E
- Country: Armenia
- Province: Gegharkunik
- Municipality: Chambarak
- Founded: 1922

Population (2011)
  - Total: 370
- Time zone: UTC+4 (AMT)

Getik (Armenian: Գետիկ) is a village in the Chambarak Municipality of the Gegharkunik Province of Armenia.

== History ==
The village was founded in 1922 by settlers from Artsvashen and has megalithic monuments, khachkars and an Iron Age cyclopean fort by the name of "Mughani Khach".

== Gallery ==
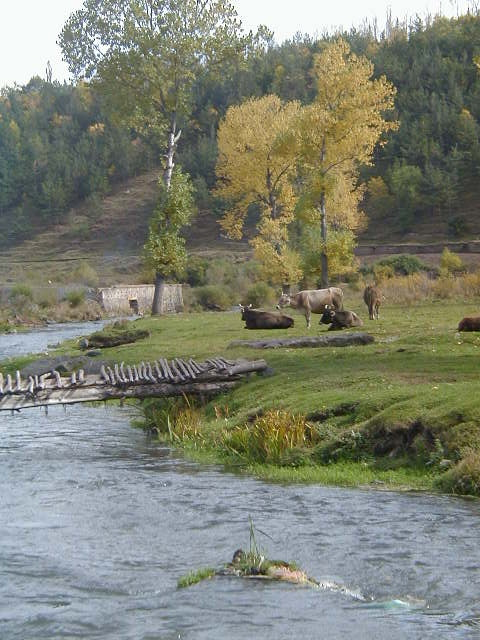
Getik State Sanctuary

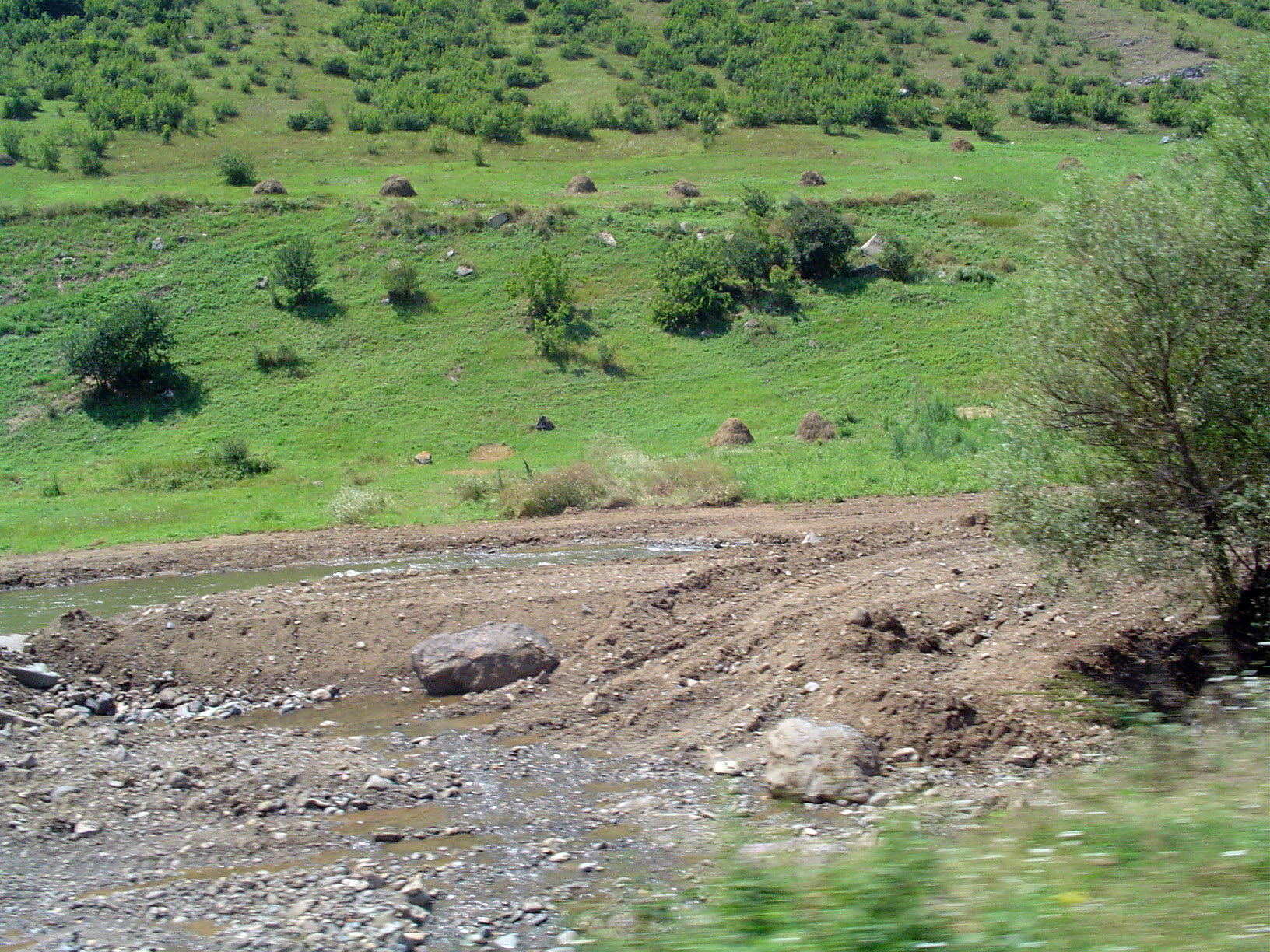
Getik State Sanctuary

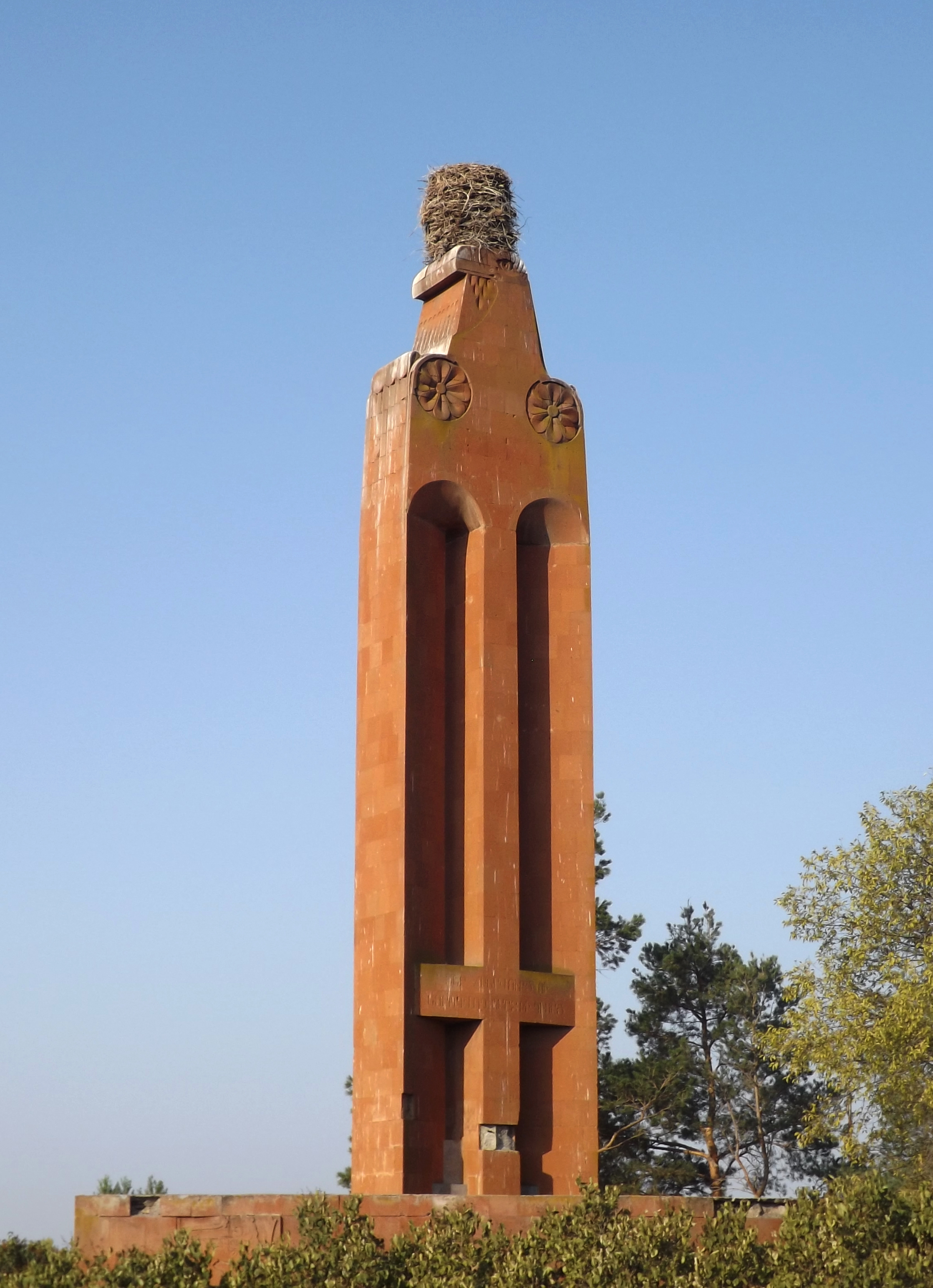
WWII monument in Getik

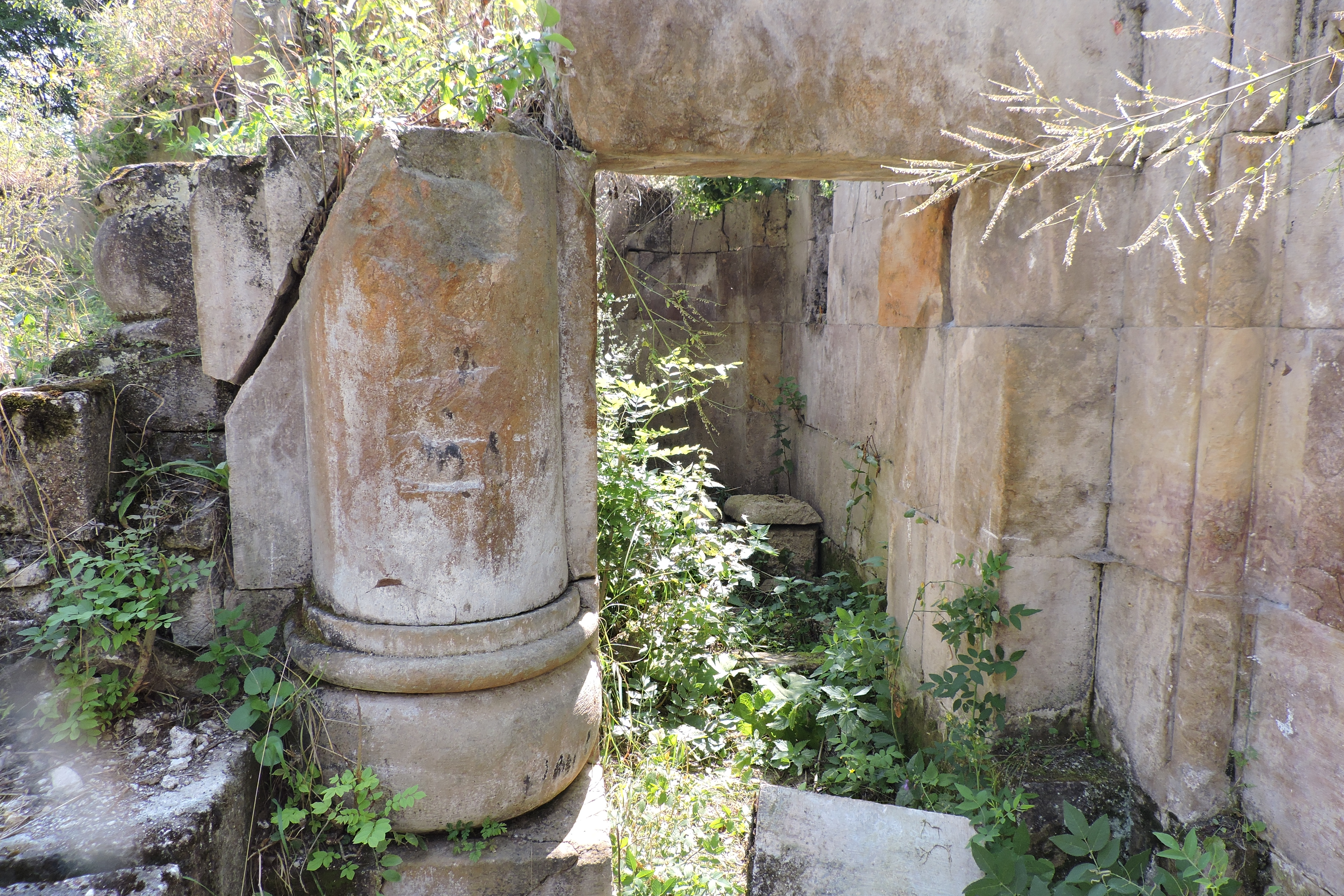
Hin Getik Monastery

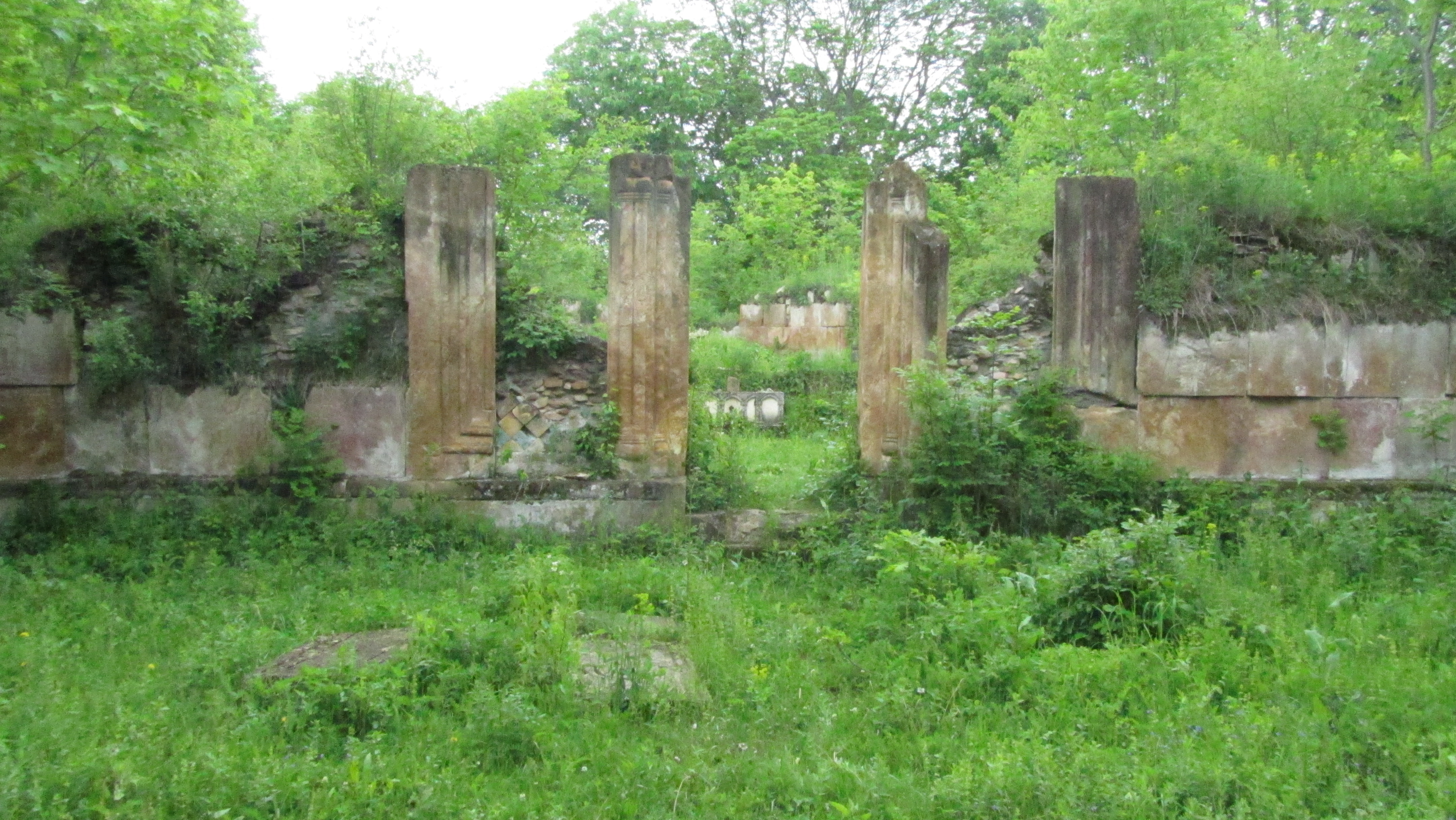
Hin Getik Monastery
