= Verin Chambarak =

Former village in Gegharkunik, Armenia

Verin-Chambarak Վերին Ճամբարակ
- Location within Armenia Location within Gegharkunik
- Coordinates: 40°36′14″N 45°20′37″E
- Country: Armenia
- Province: Gegharkunik
- Municipality: Chambarak
- Time zone: UTC+4

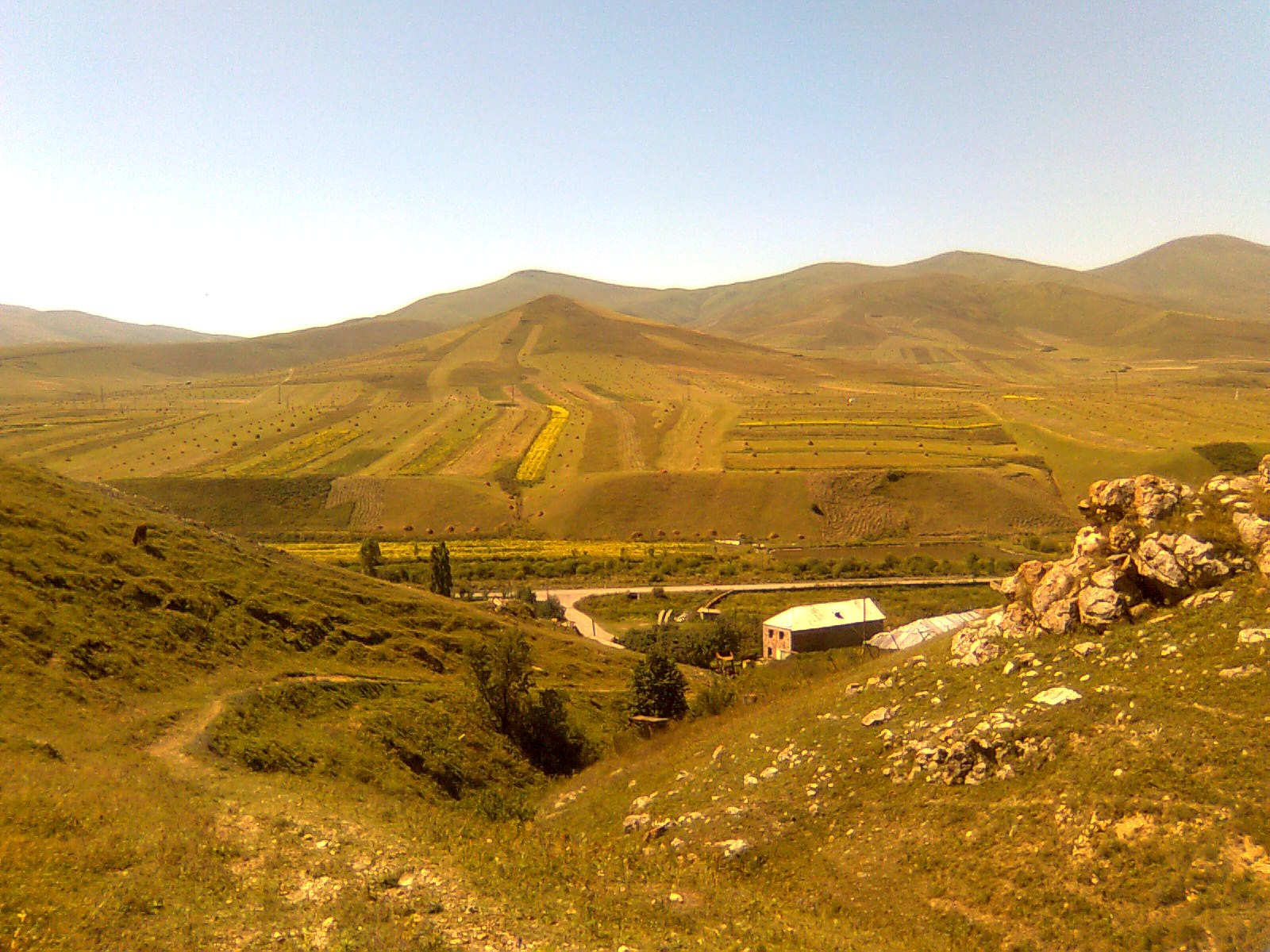
view at the site of Verin Chambarak

Verin Chambarak or Verkhny Chambarak (Armenian: Վերին Ճամբարակ) was a village in the Gegharkunik Province of Armenia, currently part of the town of Chambarak.

== See also ==
- Gegharkunik Province
