= Aramais Sahakyan =

Armenian poet, humorist, publicist and translator

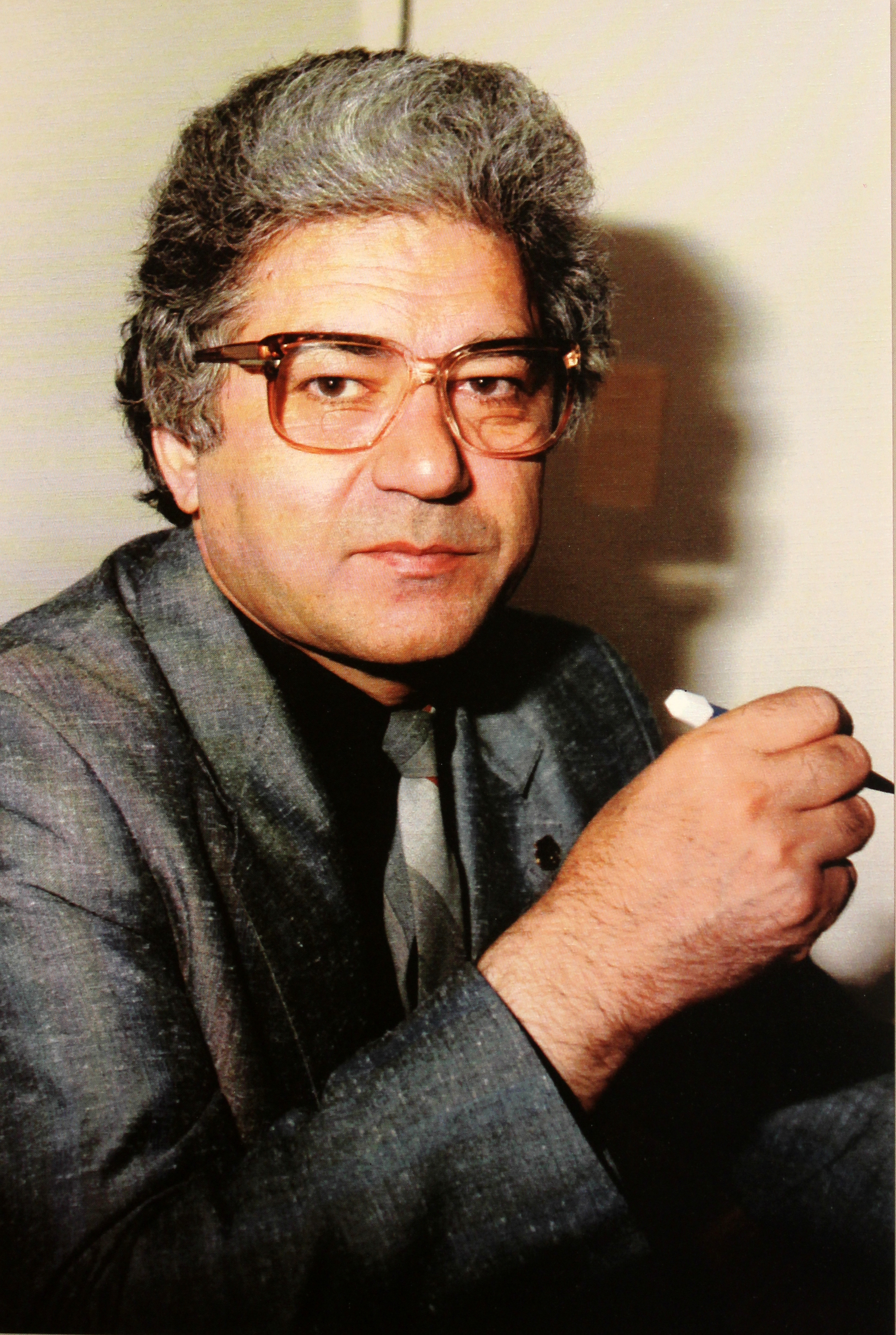
- Aramais Sahakyan
- Born: May 24, 1936; Artsvashen, Armenian SSR, Transcaucasian SFSR, Soviet Union
- Died: March 14, 2013 (aged 76); Yerevan, Armenia
- Occupations: poet, humorist, publicist and translator

Aramais Sahakyan (Armenian: Արամայիս Սահակյան, May 24, 1936 – March 14, 2013) was an Armenian poet, humorist, publicist and translator.

== Biography ==
Sahakyan was born in Artsvashen, Armenian SSR. A graduate of the Armenian State Teacher Training Institute's (now university) Language and History Department, Sahakyan later took higher literary courses at the Maxim Gorky Literature Institute. In the 1960s he was a publisher for the Armenian periodicals Avanguard and Garun ('Spring,' a literary monthly). From 1970 till 1971, Sahakyan worked at the State Commission of the Armenian Television and Radio. He was better known for his humor weekly, Vozni ('Hedgehog'), where he was editor-in-chief for over 30 years (1982–2013).

Sahakyan's best-known books are Starlet (1958), Love Age (1959), We Are Together (1964), To Love and to Live (1968), Be Happy (1972), and I Love you (1975). He was a laureate of USSR and foreign awards. His literary pieces have been translated into many languages. After the collapse of the USSR, Sahakyan was a member of independent Armenia's first parliament.

He died, age 76, in Yerevan, Armenia.

== "The Moon" poem ==
A translated stanza of the poem reads:

The Moon is so far away,

yet man has set foot on it; Mount Ararat is so close,

yet we still cannot reach it.

The poet captured the paradox of Mount Ararat as both near and unreachable in his poem "Լուսին" (Lusin, "The Moon"). Sahakyan wrote the poem reflecting on the separation of Mount Ararat—historically associated in Armenian culture with Western Armenia—from present-day Armenia and the Armenian people.

From Yerevan, Mount Ararat appears strikingly close, yet lies across the border in Turkey, giving the image its sense of physical proximity and political separation. Journalist Robert Kaplan says that "Ararat calls forth the forbidden land—the lost part of historic Armenia encompassing much of present-day Turkey and the site of the 1915 genocide...Whenever they [Armenians] look toward the southwestern horizon at the awe-inspiring mountain, the inhabitants [of] Yerevan are reminded of ancient and medieval glory, and of twentieth-century mass murder."

In 1975, Soviet Komsomol secretary Iasha Bablian publicly recited the poem in Nagorno-Karabakh. It was treated as a nationalist provocation; Bablian was dismissed from his job and forced to leave Karabakh, and purges of Armenian intellectuals followed soon afterward.
