= Alıcan =

- Location within Azerbaijan Location within Karabakh Economic Region
- Coordinates: 39°36′34″N 46°47′14″E
- Country: Azerbaijan
- District: Khojavend
- Time zone: UTC+4 (AZT)
  - Summer (DST): UTC+5 (AZT)

Alıcan (Alyjan) is a former village in the current Khojavend District of Azerbaijan. Before its abolition, the village was part of the Kohnakand Rural administrative division of the Lachin District. By the Law of the Republic of Azerbaijan dated December 5, 2023, Alyjan was abolished, and its territory was transferred to the Khojavend District.
