= Parakənd, Gadabay =

Parakənd
- Municipality
- Location within Azerbaijan
- Coordinates: 40°32′05″N 45°41′25″E
- Country: Azerbaijan
- Rayon: Gadabay

Population
  - Total: 1,979
- Time zone: UTC+4 (AZT)
  - Summer (DST): UTC+5 (AZT)

Parakənd (also, Parakend) is a village and municipality in the Gadabay Rayon of Azerbaijan. It has a population of 1,979. The municipality consists of the villages of Parakənd and Qaravultomba.
