= Köhnəkənd, Gadabay =

Coordinates: 40.5473405°N 45.7087326°E

Köhnəkənd is a village in the municipality of Dəyirmandağ in the Gadabay Rayon of Azerbaijan.
