= Qurudərə, Gadabay =

Qurudərə
- Location within Azerbaijan
- Coordinates: 40°33′46″N 45°43′04″E
- Country: Azerbaijan
- Rayon: Gadabay
- Municipality: Dəyirmandağ
- Time zone: UTC+4 (AZT)
  - Summer (DST): UTC+5 (AZT)

Qurudərə (also, Kurudere and Kurudara) is a village in the Gadabay Rayon of Azerbaijan. The village forms part of the municipality of Dəyirmandağ.
