= Artsvashen =

Village and exclave of Armenia

- Արծվաշեն
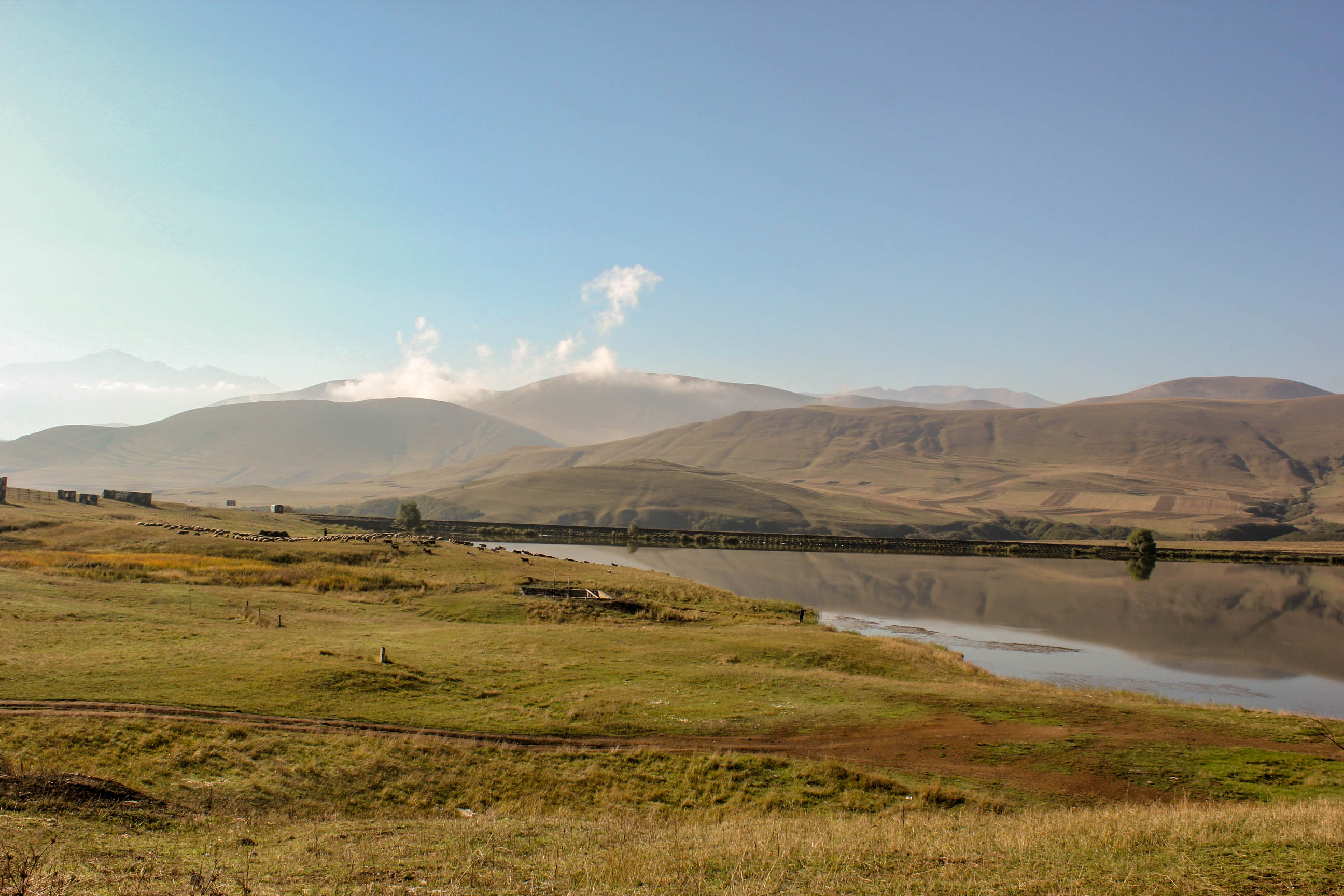
- Lake near Artsvashen
- Interactive map of Artsvashen
- Location within Armenia Location within Gegharkunik Location within Azerbaijan
- Coordinates: 40°38′46″N 45°30′56″E
- Country (de jure): Armenia
  - Province: Gegharkunik
  - Municipality: Chambarak
- Country (de facto): Azerbaijan
  - District: Gadabay
- Founded: 1845

Area
  - Total: 40 km^{2} (15 sq mi)

Population (2009)
  - Total: 127
- Time zone: UTC+4 (AMT)

Artsvashen (Armenian: Արծվաշեն, lit. 'Eagle village') or Bashkend (Azerbaijani: Başkənd; Armenian: Բաշքենդ) is a de jure Armenian village in the Chambarak Municipality of the Gegharkunik Province of Armenia. It is a 40 square kilometres (15 sq mi) exclave of Armenia, and is surrounded by the territory of Azerbaijan, whose forces have captured and occupied it since the First Nagorno-Karabakh War in 1992. There are ongoing border delimiting talks regarding the return of Artsvashen and other occupied sovereign territories back to Armenia, but this has yet to be done.

== Etymology ==
The name of Artsvashen is of Armenian origin and translates to eagle village from (Armenian: արծիվ, romanized: artsiv, lit. 'eagle'). The village was previously named Bashgyugh, Bashkend, and Hin Bashkend'l. On 25 January 1978, the village was officially renamed Artsvashen by the Soviet Armenian authorities.

== History ==
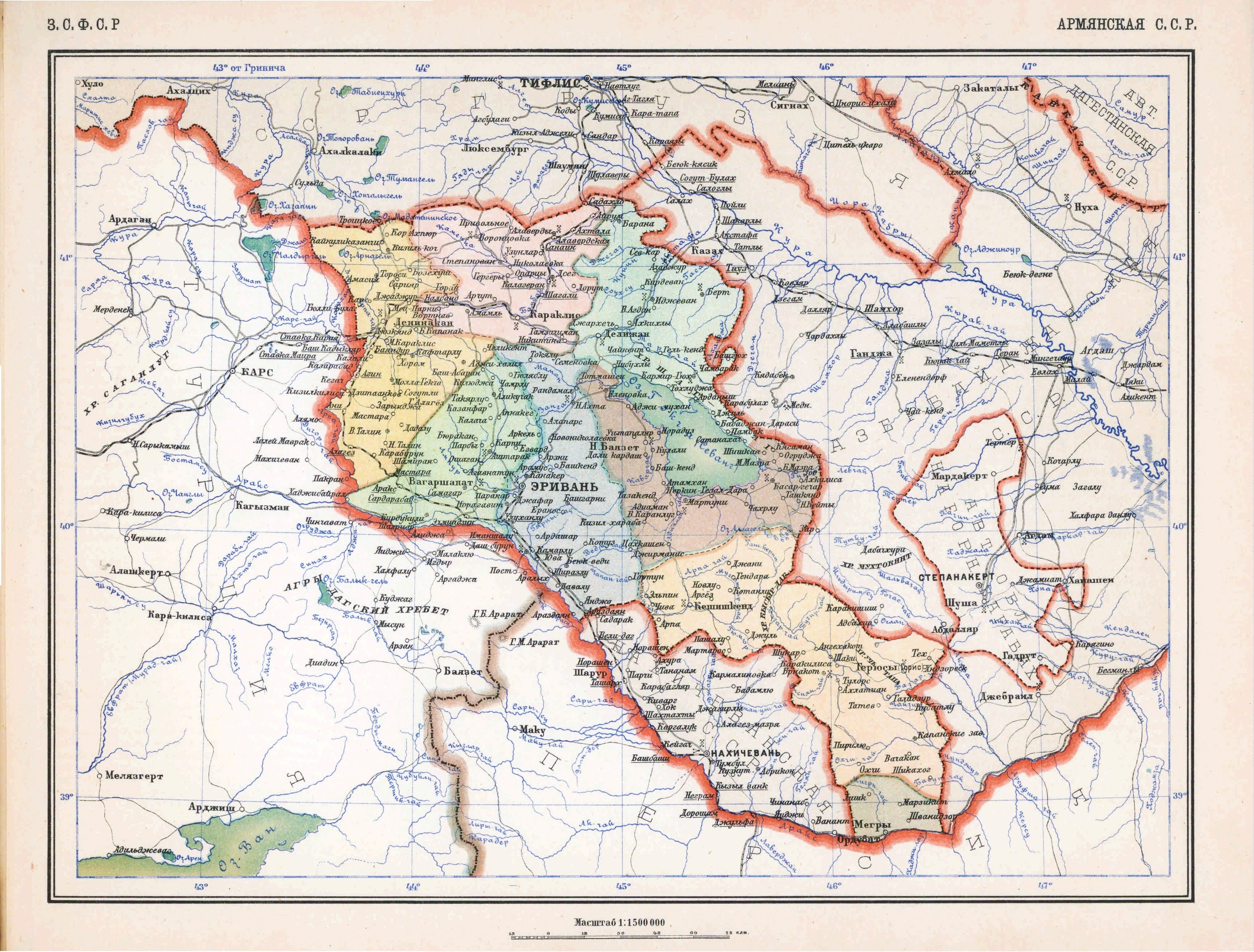
Village of Artsvashen (then called Bashgyugh) on map of Armenian SSR in 1928

The Armenians of Artsvashen trace their roots to the Jraberd district of the historic province of Artsakh. They left Artsakh in the 18th century to Choratan in Shamshadin. Later, they moved to the historic Armenian village of Parakert (Paragyugh) where they founded the present village of Artsvashen sometime between 1845 and 1859 as Bashkend. However, an earlier Armenian presence in the area is attested by an inscription dated to 1607 on the Surb Hovhannes church in the town. The residents of Artsvashen attest to the following legend on the foundation of their town:

The residents of Artzvashen and the Turks inhabiting the nearby plain entered into a conflict, the latter demanding that the former leave the territory serving them as a pasture. The Armenians, however, refused to do so declaring that they were in their native land and had nowhere else to go to. The problem was finally settled through wrestling and a bullfight: the Armenian side won both of them thanks to wrestler Arzuman Dallakian and a bull named Tzaghik that belonged to a certain Sahak’s family. Thus, the territorial dispute was resolved in favour of the Armenians.

Artsvashen belonged to the Melik-Kalantarian family of landowners in the late 19th century. It was later renamed to Hin Bashkend (Armenian: Հին Բաշքենդ), meaning Old Bashkend to differentiate it from New or Nor Bashkend, founded by migrants from the original settlement. In 1920 the village was also referred to as Bashgyugh. The village was affected by the Armenian–Tatar massacres of 1905–1906, undergoing 13 attacks from neighboring Turkic villages. Nevertheless, due to the well-organized self defense of the village, Artsvashen did not suffer the same destruction as other Armenian villages during that time.

From 1920 onwards, Artsvashen formed part of Soviet Armenia, as part of its Karmir (Krasnoselsk) district, initially connected to Armenia by a peninsular land corridor. In 1923–1929, the territorial dispute over Artsvashen was settled by a commission of the "Transcaucasian central executive committee" in favour of Armenia, however, in January 1927, 12,000 hectares (120 square kilometres; 46 square miles) of land surrounding Artsvashen were "gifted" to Azerbaijan. As "compensation", in February 1929 Armenia was transferred a narrow strip of land to serve as a land connection to the village, however, this decision was reversed in the 1930s and Artsvashen became an exclave again. During Soviet times, Artsvashen had 2 secondary schools, a branch of a vocational school, a church, a club, a library, a hospital, a pharmacy, a kindergarten, several cinemas, a communication department and, a life service booth.

=== First Nagorno-Karabakh War ===
In May 1991, during the First Nagorno-Karabakh War, the Armenian Interior Ministry reported that residents of Artsvashen had averted an army occupation by surrendering their arms. However, on August 4, 1992, Azerbaijani forces completely devastated the village and stripped it of its Armenian inhabitants, effectively occupying the village. Over 2,000 Armenian residents were expelled to the town of Chambarak whose former Molokan-Russian population had largely left for Russia. According to The New York Times, on 9 August 1992 the Azerbaijani side announced that armed forces had "liberated" the town, destroying enemy tanks and weaponry and killing 300 Armenian "brigands", while Armenian reports mentioned no dead but said 29 people were "missing without trace".

Accusing Azerbaijan of mounting an "undeclared war", Armenian President Levon Ter-Petrosyan sent a telegram to leaders of the Commonwealth of Independent States saying that "aggression has been committed against a state that is a member of the C.I.S. and the system of collective security".

The village was swiftly renamed to its settler name Bashkend. Today, the village is largely abandoned as the Azerbaijani army expelled its Armenian population after it captured the territory, and is now occupied by Azerbaijan as part of its Gadabay District. As of 2011, there were approximately 8,400 IDPs (Internally displaced people) expelled from Artsvashen and the surrounding regions, living in Armenia. Although Artsvashen still has empty houses belonging to Armenians, the village has now been settled by Azerbaijanis and the local Armenian church has been converted to a mosque. There is a military checkpoint at the entrance to the village and the entrance of foreigners and journalists is strictly prohibited.

== Neighborhoods ==
In the center of the village stood the Nerkin (lower) or Kachal (Note: Armenian for "bald" due to the small number of gardens in the area.) quarter where the palace of culture was located. In the north of the village, the Verin (upper) quarter and Tsits Kar adjoined the Saribekiants' quarter. The Shushiants' quarter was located above where the Haram extended and was the location of the local secondary school. Upon the expansion and development of the village, two new quarters named Chinastagh (Chinastan) and Palkh-Kyand were incorporated into the village.

== Historical heritage sites ==
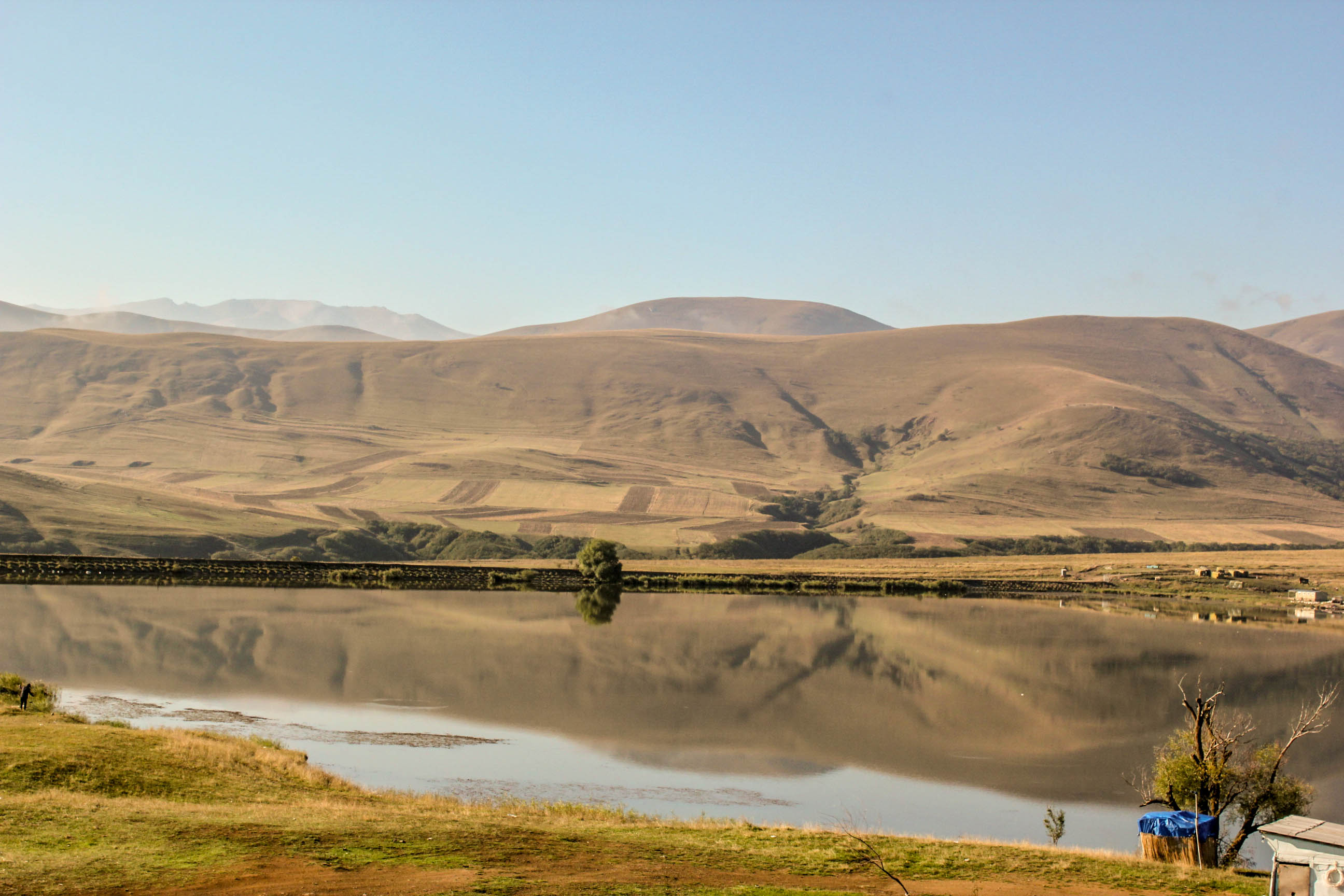
Artsvashen Water Reservoir built in 1968 and covering several Bronze Age tombs from the 10th to 8th century

The area of Artsvashen includes many significant historical and cultural monuments, including Bronze Age tombs, medieval churches, cemeteries, sanctuaries, and khachkars. In the center of the town stands the St. Minas Church of 1872, which was described in 1888 as a "high building of tiled roof is distinguished for its splendid ornamentation". The St. Hovhannes Church of 1607 was built by the former inhabitants of the village and repaired in 1857. The site of the former village of Paragyugh (Parakert) lies 1 to 1.5 kilometers east of Artsvashen. In addition, remains of a cyclopean fort have also been found in the area.

== Compensation claims ==
In 2009, former residents of Artsvashen village that were still residents of Chambarak nearly 20 years later were promised six billion drams of Armenian government compensation for their lost property. Two payments of 50 million drams were made and then, in 2011, a bigger one of 708 million drams was given out in 2011, with around 2000 people getting about 360 thousand drams each. However, further payments stalled leading to protests in September 2018 and December 2019, demanding further funds to repair the dilapidated housing stock in Chambarak. Armenian premier Pashinyan claimed that the state had fulfilled all its obligations to refugees with money already disbursed and with the provision of housing certificates to about 112 families.

== Artsvashen carpets ==
In the Soviet times there was a branch of Haygorg ("Armenian carpet" state company) in Artsvashen. After the capture of Artsvashen by the Azerbaijani forces, the residents of Artsvashen migrated to Shorzha, Vardenis, Abovyan and Chambarak, where they continued traditions of this art:

The women of Artsvashen learned carpet weaving from their mothers and grandmothers. Many of them had worked for Haygorg for decades. "It was shameful for a girl or woman in Artsvashen not to be able to weave carpets. Even if they didn't work for Haygorg, they would have a weaving stand at home and make carpets," said Irina Ghalechyan, a former resident of Artsvashen and carpet weaver.

— Lena Nazaryan, for Hetq

== Demographics ==
The population timeline of Artsvashen since 1831 is as follows:

Year	Population	Note
1873	1,015	
1897	1,847	100% Armenian Apostolic
1908	2,687	Mainly Armenian
1911	2,687	Mainly Armenian
1914	3,079	Mainly Tatar (Note: Later known as Azerbaijani. Based on previous years' statistics, "Tatar" is likely to be a printing error in the Caucasian Calendar.)
1915	3,079	Mainly Tatar
1926	2,909	
1939	4,280	
1959	4,112	
1970	3,368	
1979	2,771	
2009	127	

== Gallery ==
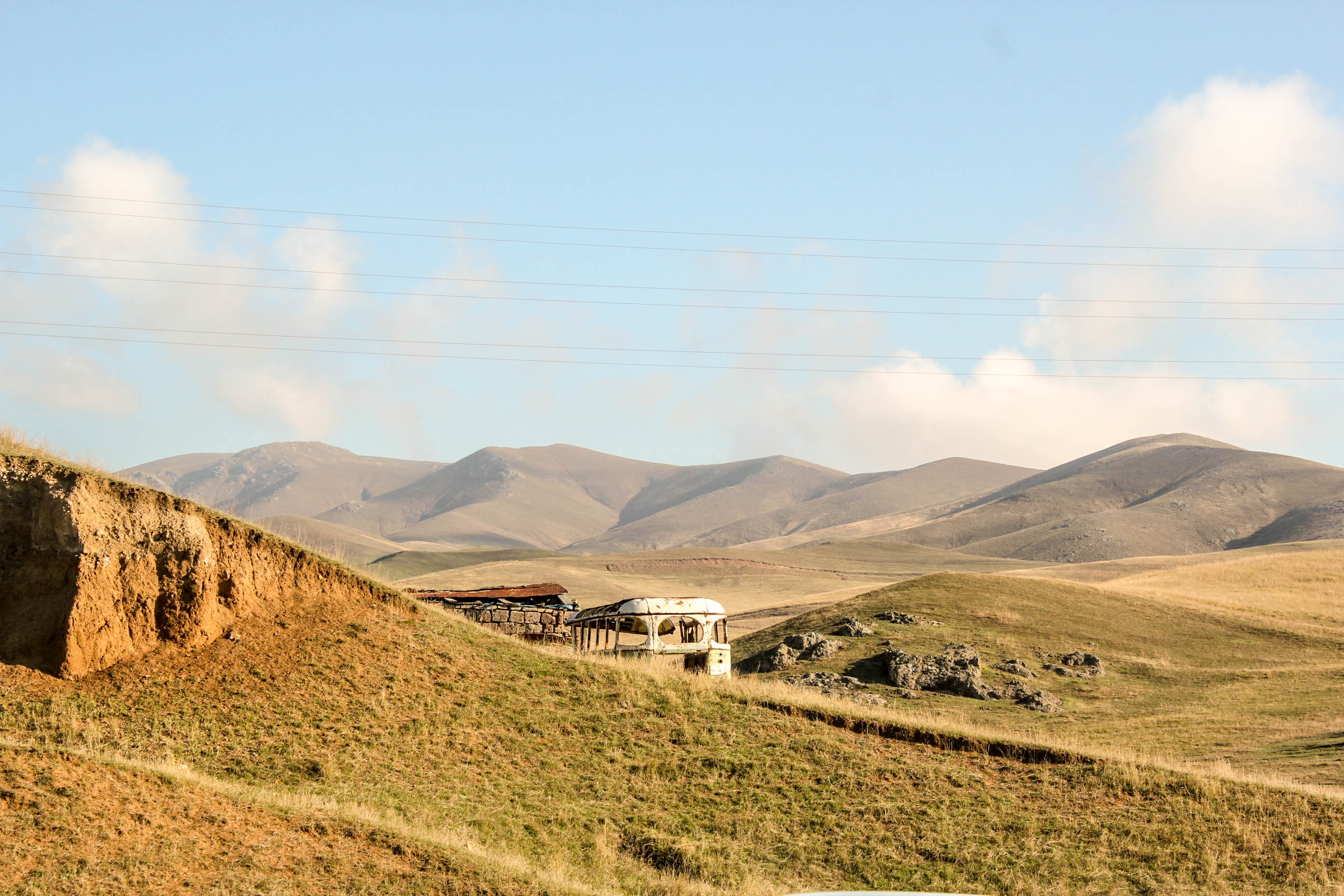
Scenery around Artsvashen

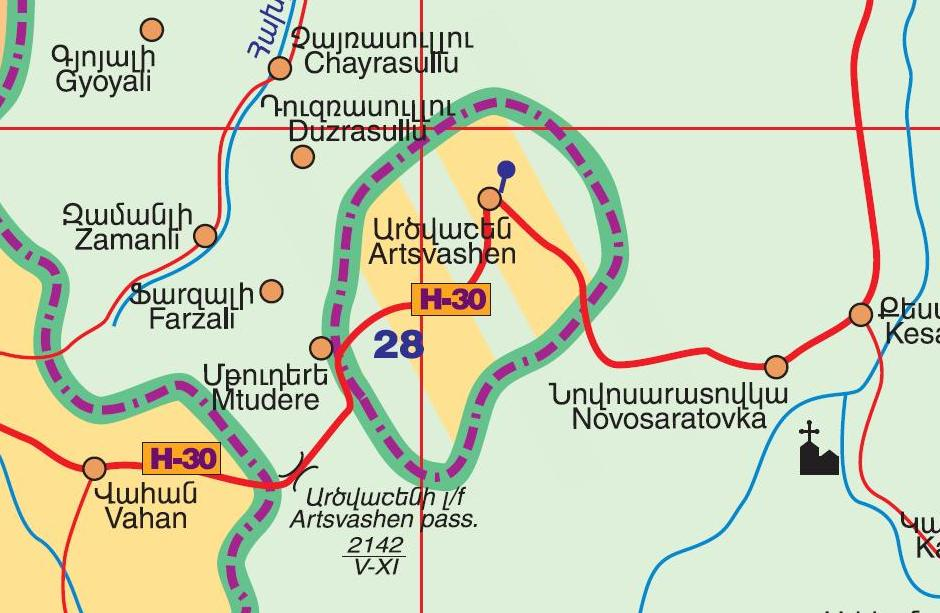
Map of Artsvashen

== Notable people ==
Aramais Sahakyan was a locally-born Armenian poet and humorist who attended the Maxim Gorky Literature Institute for higher literary courses. He was known for his humor weekly, Vozni ('Hedgehog'), where he was editor-in-chief for over 30 years. After the collapse of the USSR, Sahakyan was a member of independent Armenia's first parliament.

Saribek Chilingaryan was a locally-born Armenian Soviet guard soldier in the Great Patriotic War. He joined the Red Army to battle against the Nazi invaders from August 1943. He particularly distinguished himself in the Battle of Berlin, where he was the first to swim across the canal near the village of Bushkhov and knock out two enemy tanks with grenades. For his bravery and heroism, Chilingaryan was nominated Hero of the Soviet Union by the Chief of Staff of the 1st Belorussian Front, Colonel General Mikhail Malinin.

== See also ==
- List of enclaves and exclaves
