= Yaqublu, Gadabay =

Yaqublu
- Location within Azerbaijan
- Coordinates: 40°35′10″N 45°43′32″E
- Country: Azerbaijan
- Rayon: Gadabay
- Municipality: Şəkərbəy
- Time zone: UTC+4 (AZT)
  - Summer (DST): UTC+5 (AZT)

Yaqublu (also, Yagublu) is a village in the Gadabay Rayon of Azerbaijan, and is part of the municipality of Şəkərbəy.
