= Choratan =

Choratan Չորաթան
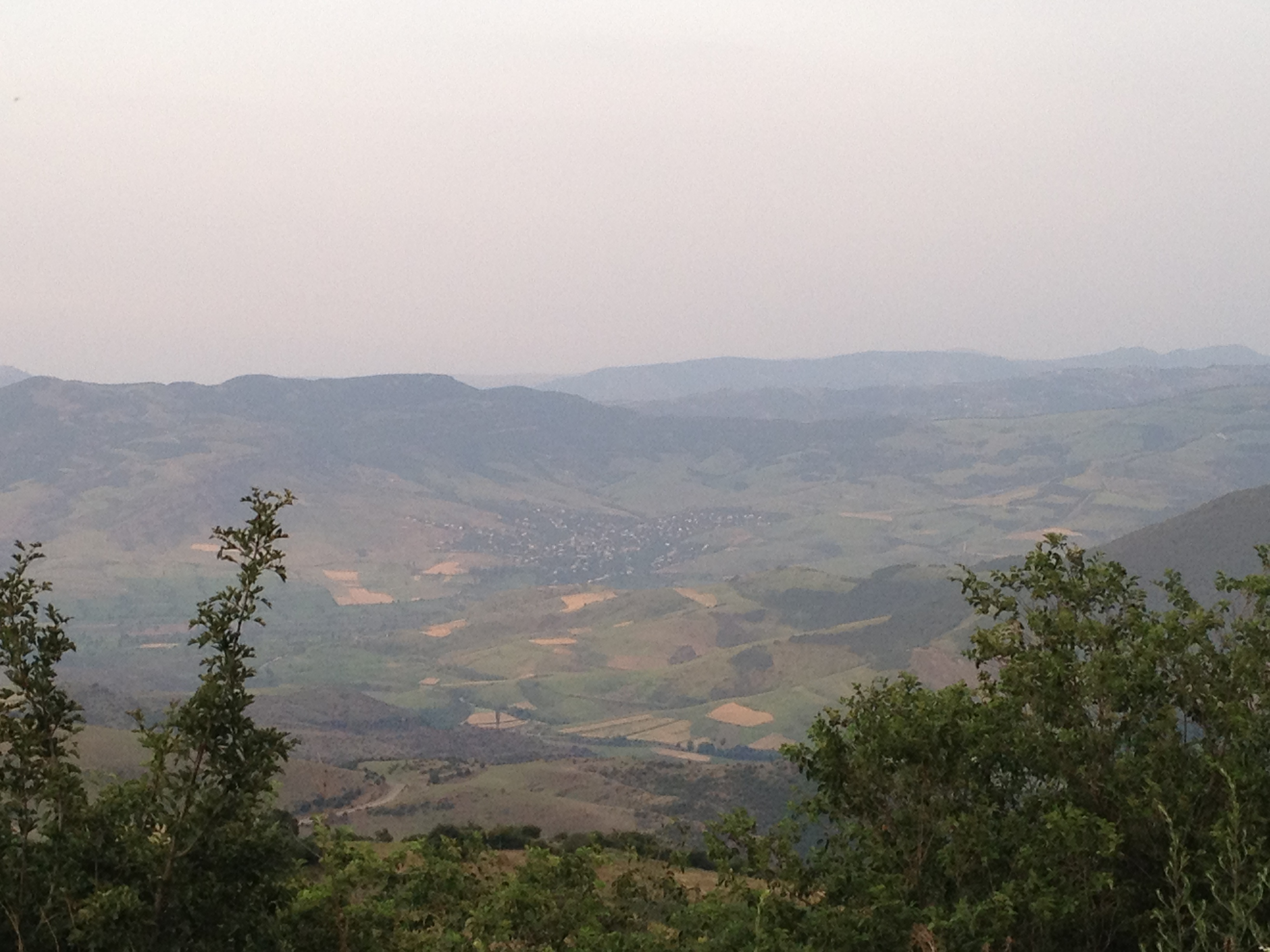
- Scenery around Choratan

- Location within Armenia Location within Tavush
- Coordinates: 40°51′40″N 45°28′48″E
- Country: Armenia
- Province: Tavush
- Municipality: Berd
- Elevation: 1,050 m (3,440 ft)

Population (2011)
  - Total: 898
- Time zone: UTC+4 (AMT)

Choratan (Armenian: Չորաթան) is a village in the Berd Municipality of the Tavush Province of Armenia.
