= Parakənd, Lankaran =

Parakənd is a village and municipality in the Lankaran Rayon of Azerbaijan. It has a population of 1,149.
