= Dəstəfur =

- Municipality
- Location within Azerbaijan
- Coordinates: 40°26′59″N 46°10′15″E
- Country: Azerbaijan
- Rayon: Dashkasan

Population
  - Total: 572
- Time zone: UTC+4 (AZT)
  - Summer (DST): UTC+5 (AZT)

Dəstəfur (also, Dastafyur, Dəstətur, Dostafur, Dastaphour, Dastaphor and Dostafyur) is a village and municipality in the Dashkasan Rayon of Azerbaijan. It has a population of 572. Between 1930 and 2 April 1956, Dashkasan Region was known as the Dastafurski Rayon (Dəstəfur Rayon)

== Monuments ==
On the east of the village, over the Ganja River, is a historic stone bridge thought to date from the later 13th century. A list of Azerbaijan's ancient monuments also states that the village has a bronze age burial mound (kurgan) In a pastoral valley accessible only on foot, are the reasonably intact walls of a ruined 15th-century church, described in Azerbaijani texts as an Albanian Temple (Albanian refers here to Caucasian Albania) or sometimes as Dəstəfur bazilikası A 2017 TV programme filmed a visit to the church ruins.
