= Chambarak =

Village in Gegharkunik, Armenia

Chambarak Ճամբարակ
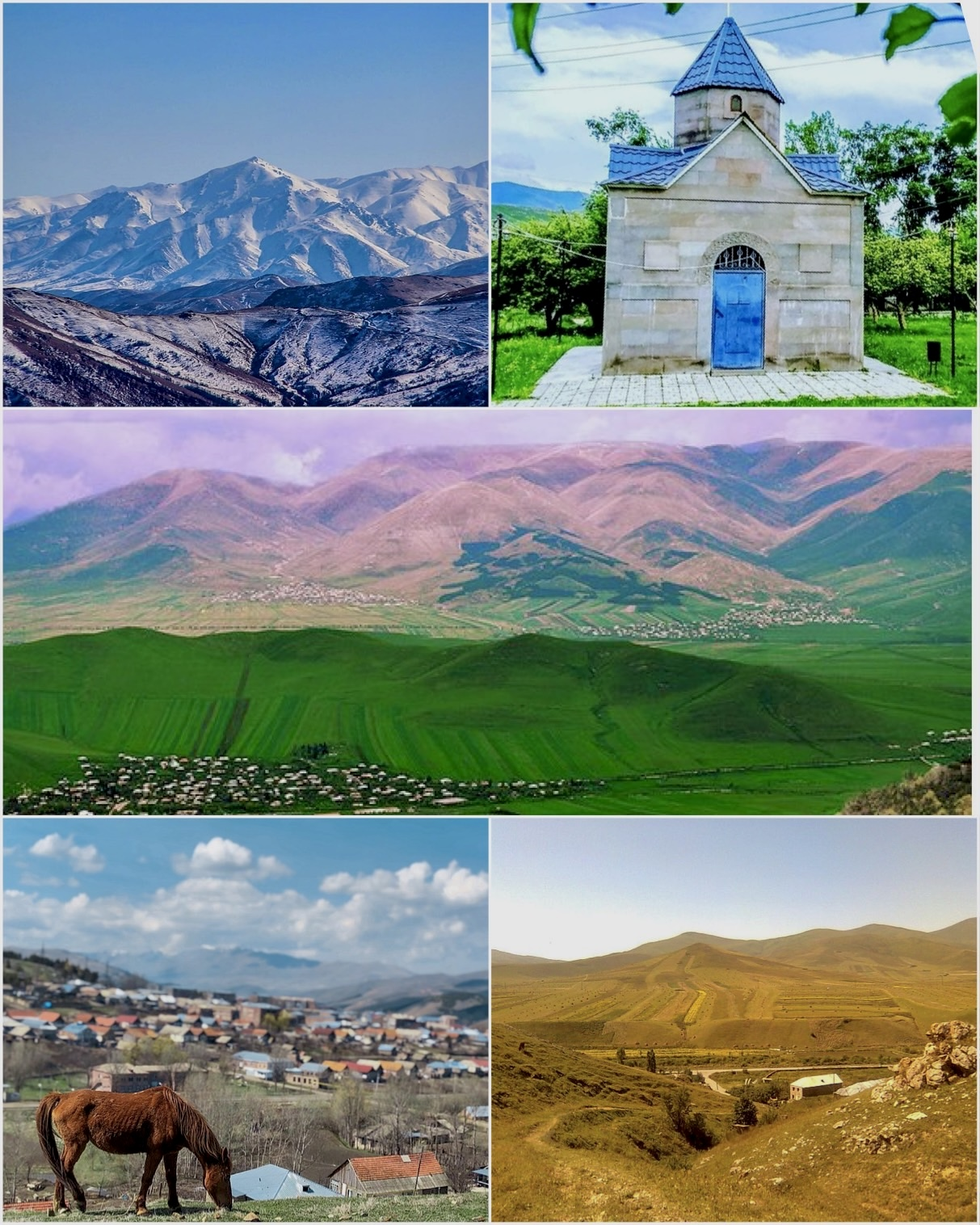
- From top left: Khndzorkut Mountain • Chambarak Chapel; Chambarak landscape and Mountains; Town Panorama • Verin Chambarak

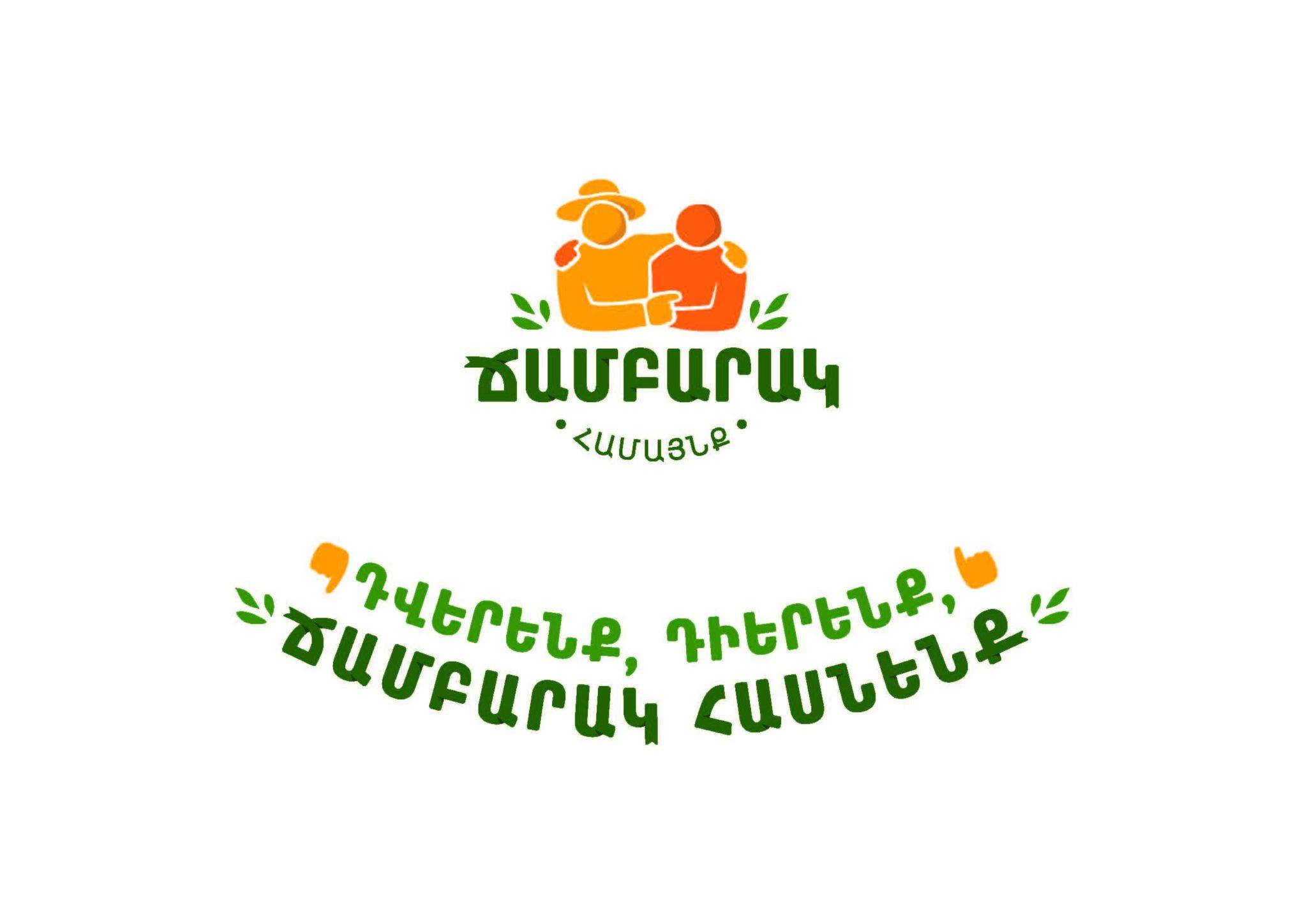
- Coat of arms

- Location within Armenia Location within Gegharkunik
- Coordinates: 40°35′43″N 45°20′51″E
- Country: Armenia
- Province: Gegharkunik
- Municipality: Chambarak
- Founded: 1830s

Area
  - Total: 6 km^{2} (2.3 sq mi)

Population (2022)
  - Total: 5,468
  - Density: 910/km^{2} (2,400/sq mi)
- Time zone: UTC+4 (AMT)

Chambarak (Armenian: Ճամբարակ, lit. 'Small camp') is a village and capital of the Chambarak Municipality of the Gegharkunik Province of Armenia. The current Chambarak town was formed by amalgamation of three settlements: Krasnoselsk, Lower Chambarak (Nerkin Chambarak) and Upper Chambarak (Verin Chambarak).

== Etymology ==
The town was known as Mikhaylovka until 1920, Karmir Gyugh from 1920 to 1971 and Krasnoselsk from 1972 to 1991, after which the town has been known as Chambarak. Karmir Gyugh and Krasnoselsk both mean "Red Village" in Armenian and Russian respectively.

== History ==
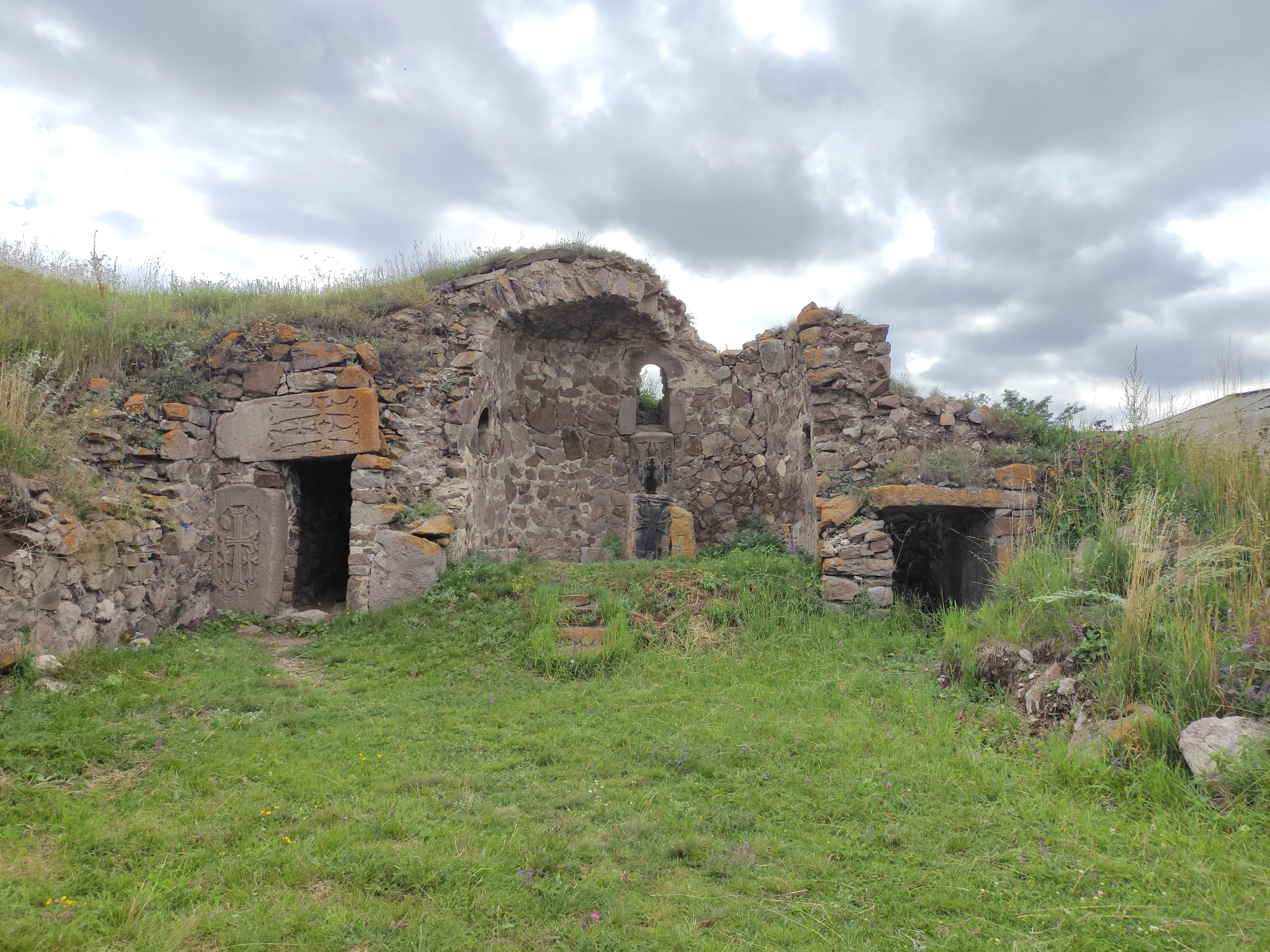
The remains of St. Grigor Church in Chambarak, dating back to 1029

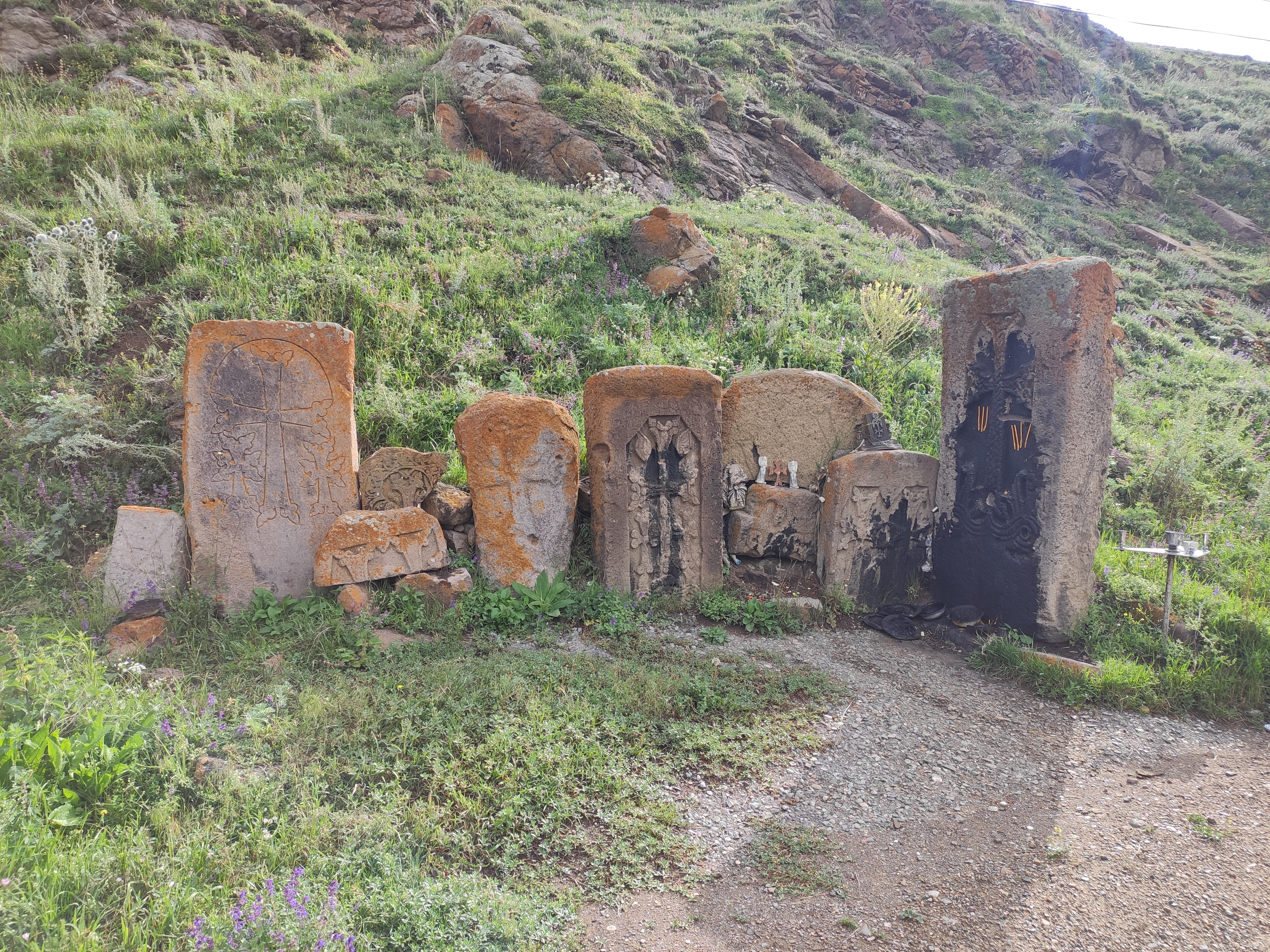
13th century khachkars in Verin-Chambarak

A settlement existed in the area of Chambarak during the Middle Ages, remains of the 11th-century St. Grigor Church and many khachkars (cross-stones) dating back to the 13th century can be found in the town.

The modern town was founded in 1835–40 as Mikhaylovka on the place of the older Armenian settlement of Chambarak on the Getik River by Russian Molokan immigrants, from the areas of Samara and Saratov of the Russian Empire.

With the sovietization of Armenia in 1920, Mikhaylovka was renamed Karmir Gyugh (Red Village). In December 1937, the Krasnoselsk Raion was formed as an administrative division of the Armenian Soviet Socialist Republic, with the village of Karmir Gyugh as its centre.

In 1971, Karmir Gyugh was enlarged with the merger of the nearby settlements of Verin (upper) and Nerkin (lower) Chambarak, and turned into an urban-type settlement. The following year, the settlement was officially renamed Krasnoselsk.

As the USSR imploded, so the majority of Krasnoselsk's Molokan-Russian population left to return to Russia. Many of their vacated homes were given to IDPs from Artsvashen, an Armenian exclave within Azerbaijan which had been captured by Azerbaijani forces on August 8, 1992. The same year, after the independence of Armenia, Krasnoselsk was renamed Chambarak and became an urban community (municipality).

In 2009, former residents of Artsvashen village, still resident in Chambarak, were promised six billion drams of Armenian government compensation for their lost property. Two payments of 50 million drams then, in 2011, a bigger one of 708 million drams was given out in 2011, with around 2,000 people getting about 360 thousand drams each. However, further payments stalled, leading to protests in September 2018 and December 2019, demanding further funds to repair the dilapidated housing stock in Chambarak. Armenian premier Pashinyan claimed that the state had fulfilled all its obligations to refugees with money already disbursed, and with the provision of housing certificates to about 112 families.

In July 2020, Chambarak became a site for clashes with Azerbaijan.

== Economy ==
The population of Chambarak is mainly involved in agriculture and animal husbandry. It used to have small farms for cheese production. However, in an interview in 2011, ArmeniaNow correspondent Gayane Mkrtchyan interviewed the mayor who said "Agriculture isn't profitable here because the soil is arid, and businesses don't invest because the region is considered to be at risk. It's termed a border zone, but it doesn't get specific privileges".

== Demographics ==
According to the 2022 census, the population of the town was 5,468. The municipal community of Chambarak has a population of 12,416 people.

Historical population
| Year | Pop. | ±% p.a. |
|---|---|---|
| 1873 | 1,273 | — |
| 1897 | 1,511 | +0.72% |
| 1926 | 2,086 | +1.12% |
| 1939 | 2,741 | +2.12% |
| 1959 | 2,974 | +0.41% |
| 1970 | 3,082 | +0.32% |
| 1980 | 6,324 | +7.45% |
| 1989 | 7,234 | +1.50% |
| 1991 | 7,300 | +0.46% |
| 2001 | 6,405 | −1.30% |
| 2011 | 5,850 | −0.90% |
| 2022 | 5,468 | −0.61% |

== Gallery ==
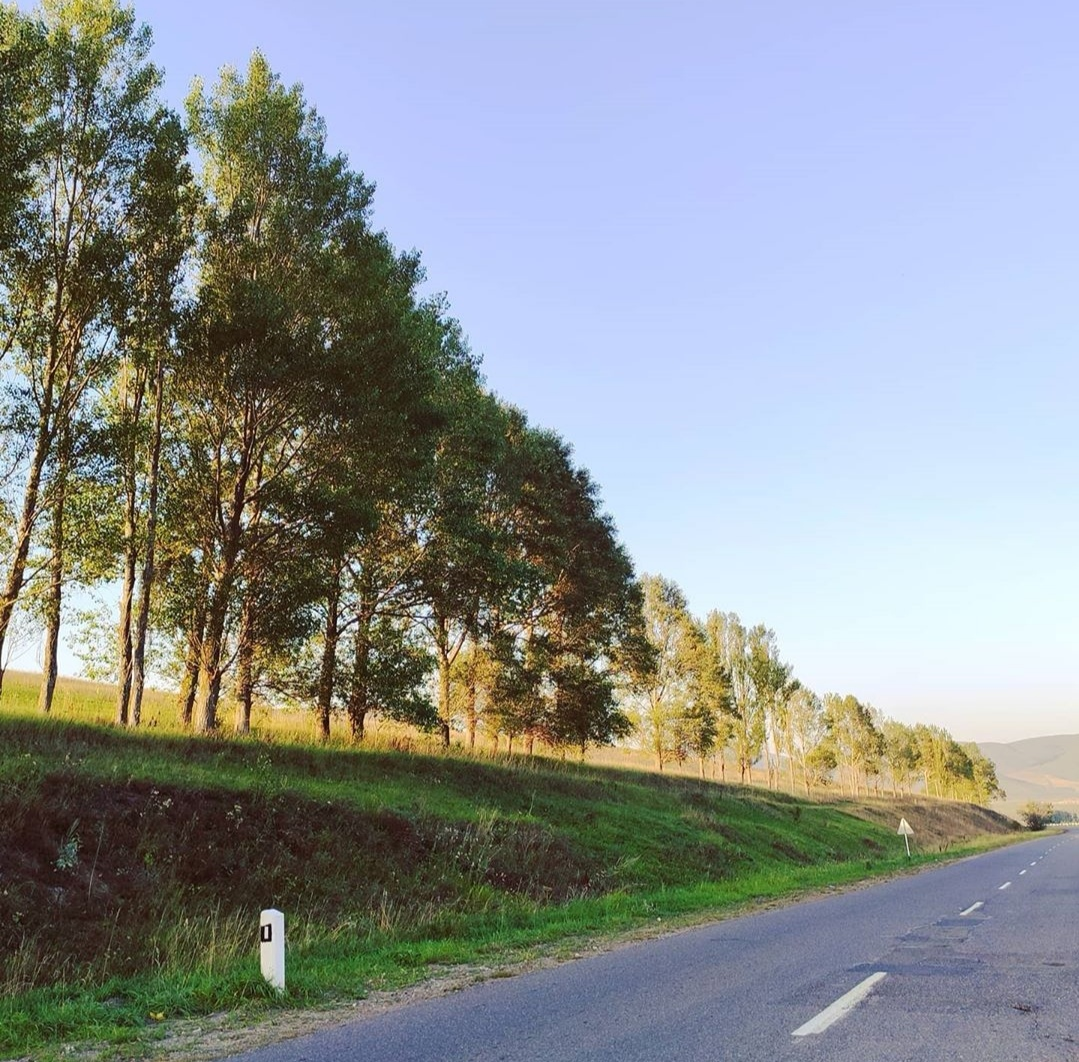
Highway in Chambarak

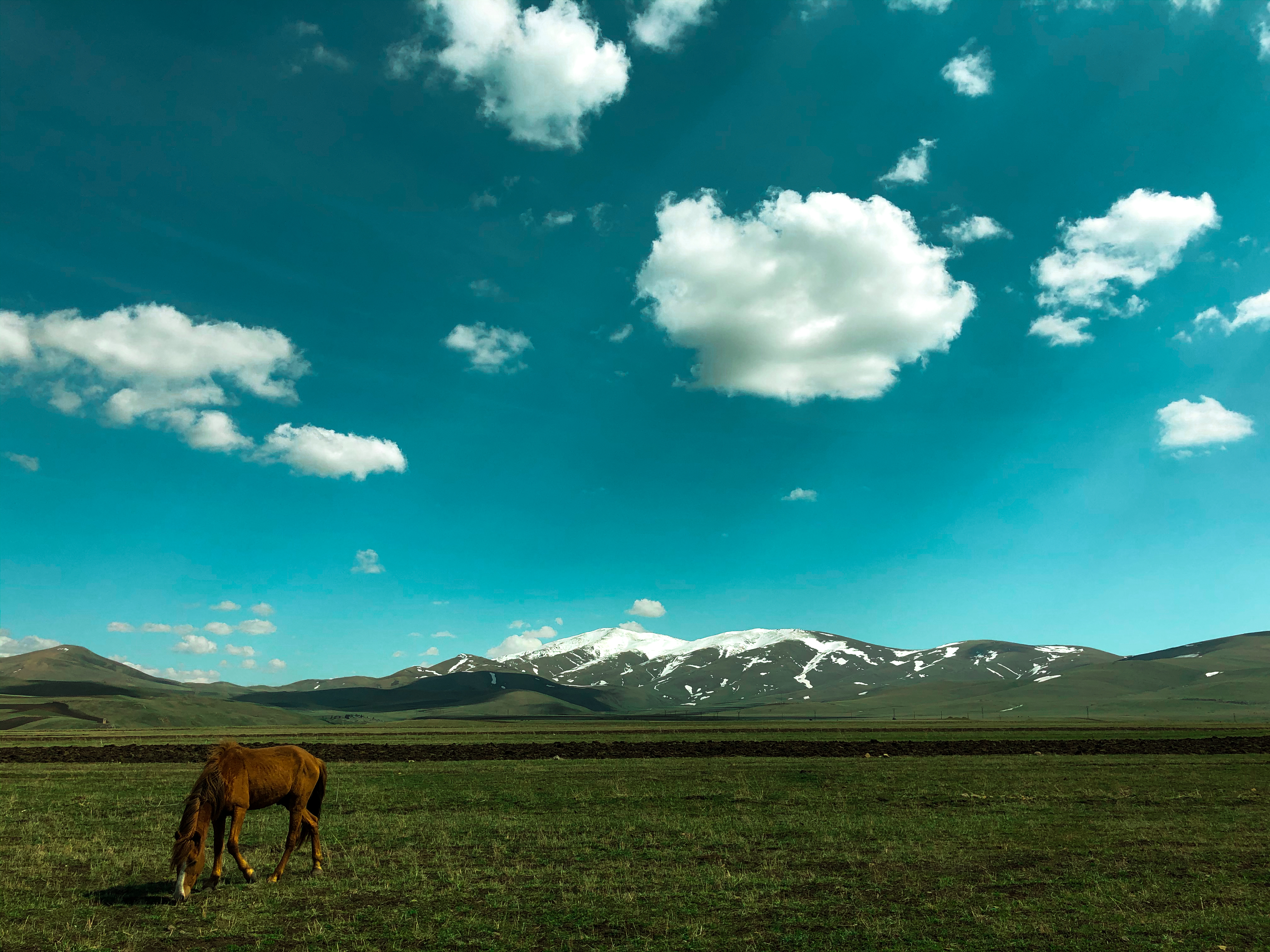
Scenery

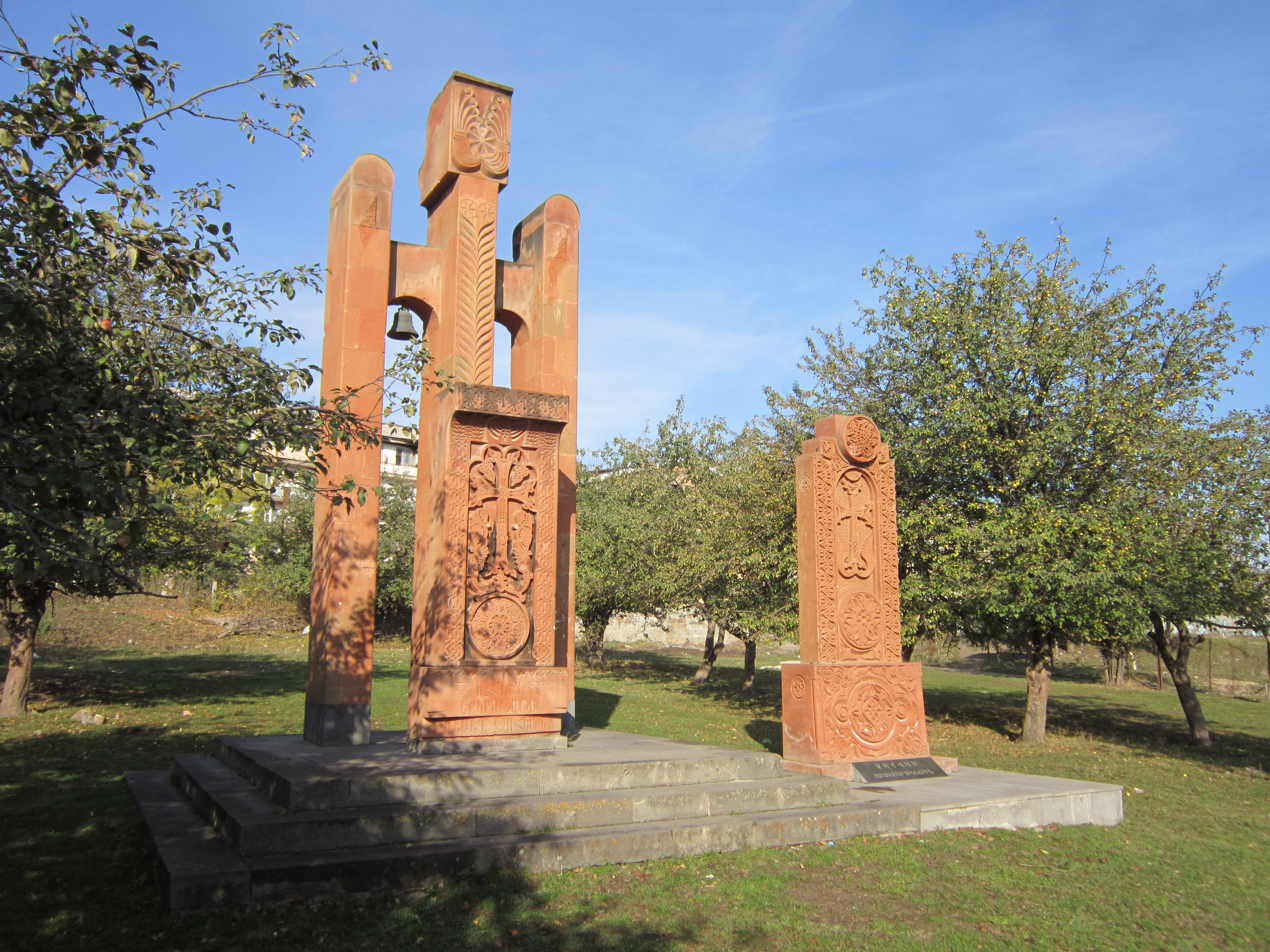
Khachkar monument

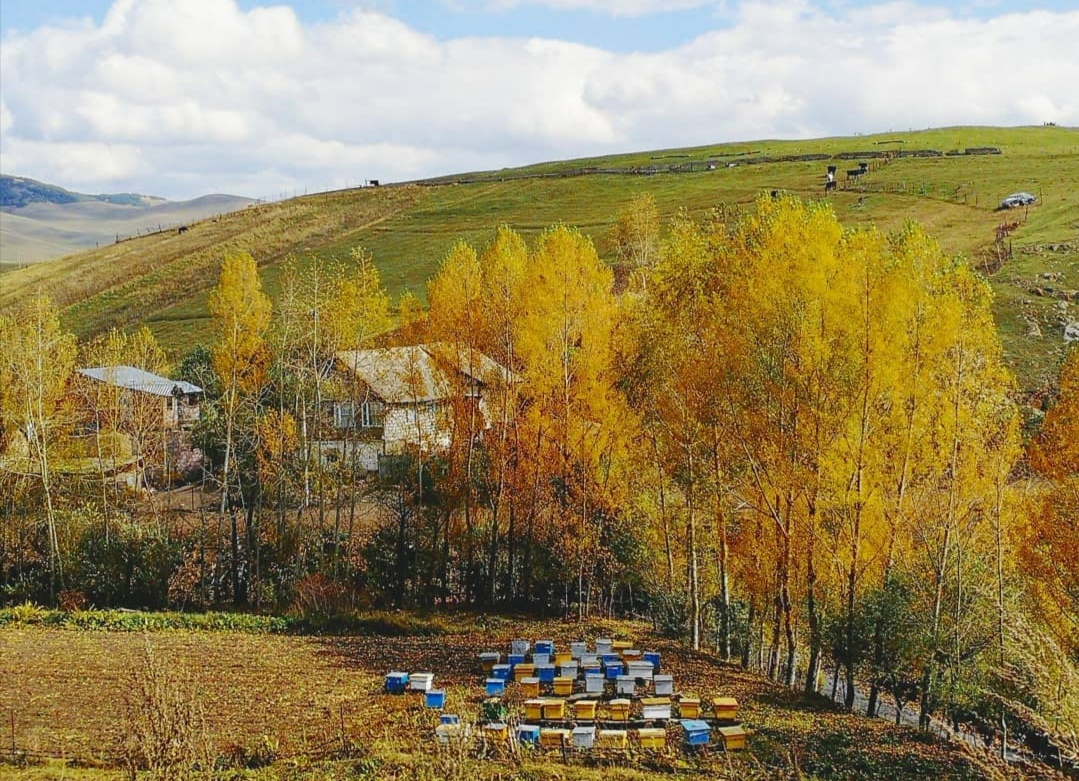
Beekeeping in the town

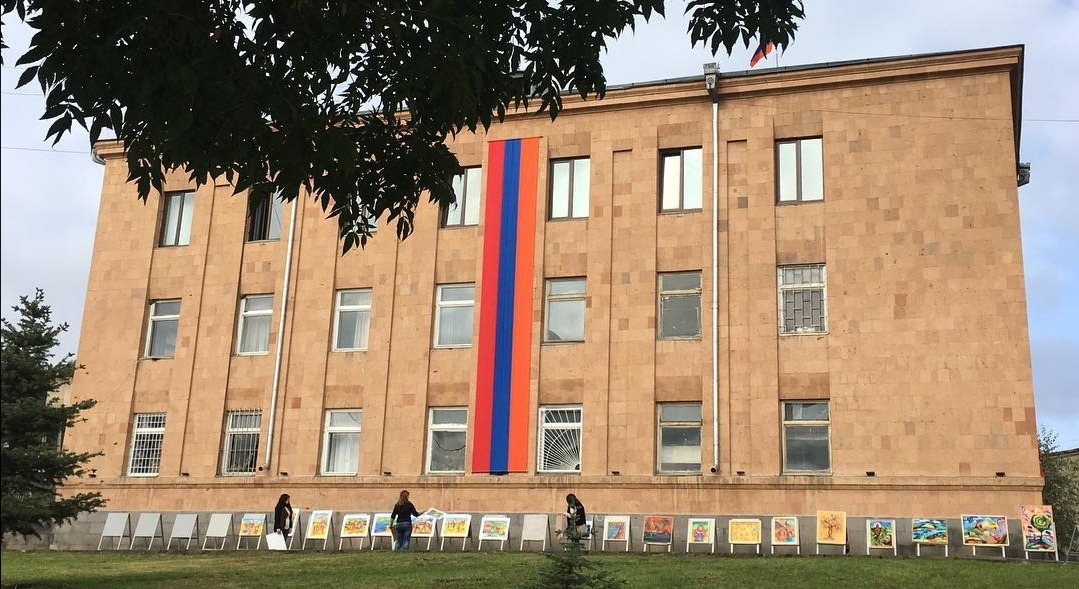
Municipal building in Chambarak
