= Turşsu, Gadabay =

Turşsu
- Location within Azerbaijan
- Coordinates: 40°42′N 45°28′E
- Country: Azerbaijan
- Rayon: Gadabay
- Time zone: UTC+4 (AZT)
  - Summer (DST): UTC+5 (AZT)

Turşsu (known as Kilsəli until 1991) is a village in the municipality of Çay Rəsullu in the Gadabay Rayon of Azerbaijan.
