= Yaqublu, Oghuz =

Yaqublu
- Municipality
- Location within Azerbaijan Location within Shaki-Zagatala Economic Region
- Coordinates: 40°55′23″N 47°27′31″E
- Country: Azerbaijan
- Rayon: Oghuz

Population
  - Total: 603
- Time zone: UTC+4 (AZT)
  - Summer (DST): UTC+5 (AZT)

Yaqublu (also, Ashaga Yakublu and Yagublu) is a village and municipality in the Oghuz Rayon of Azerbaijan. It has a population of 603.
