= Turşsu, Lachin =

Turşsu is a village in the Lachin District of Azerbaijan. It is situated near several mineral deposits and resides in a greater mountainous region.
