= Köhnəkənd, Lachin =

Köhnəkənd
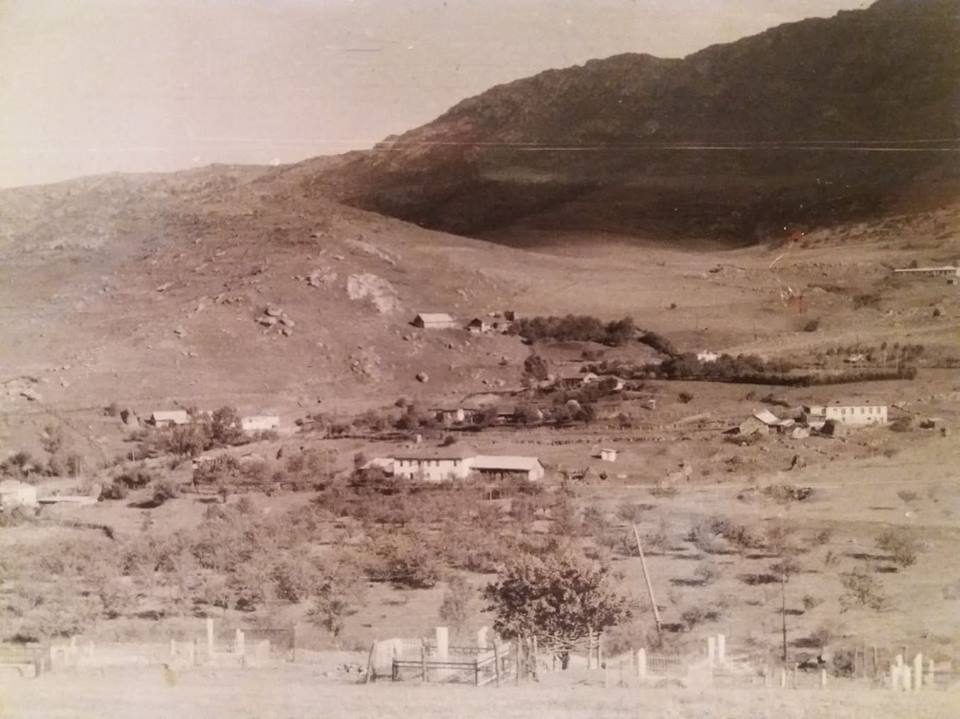

- Location within Azerbaijan Location within East Zangezur Economic Region
- Coordinates: 39°37′56″N 46°42′11″E
- Country: Azerbaijan
- District: Lachin

Population (2015)
  - Total: 86
- Time zone: UTC+4 (AZT)

Köhnəkənd (Kohnakend) is a village in the Lachin District of Azerbaijan.

== History ==
The village was located in the Armenian-occupied territories surrounding Nagorno-Karabakh, coming under the control of ethnic Armenian forces during the First Nagorno-Karabakh War in the early 1990s. The village subsequently became part of the breakaway Republic of Artsakh as part of its Shushi Province and was referred to as Kirsavan (Armenian: Քիրսավան). The village was returned to Azerbaijan on 1 December 2020 per the 2020 Nagorno-Karabakh ceasefire agreement.

== Gallery ==
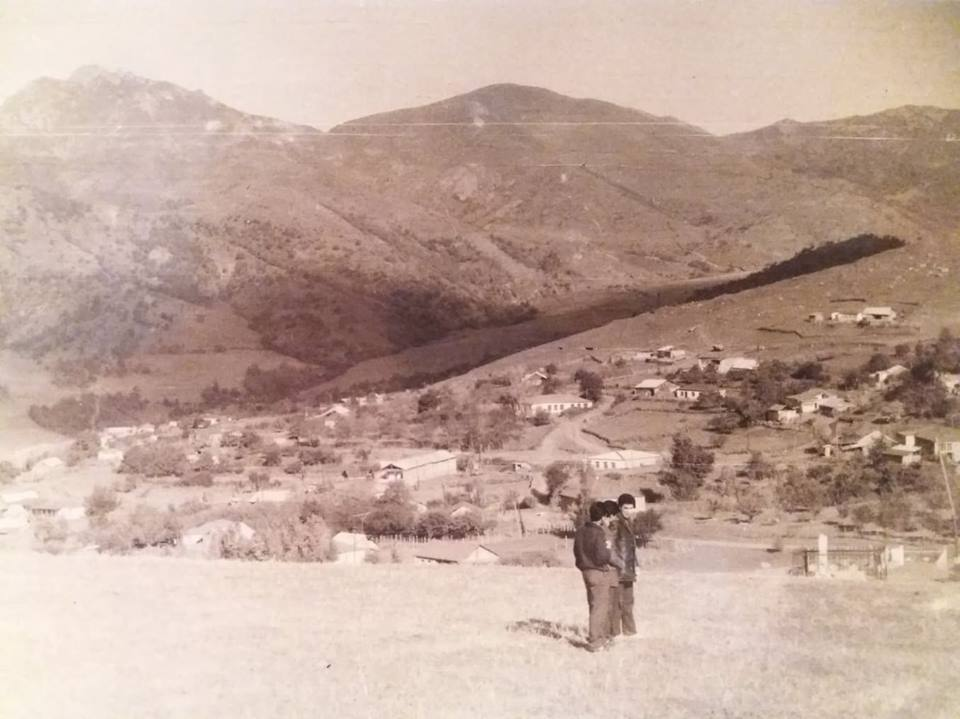

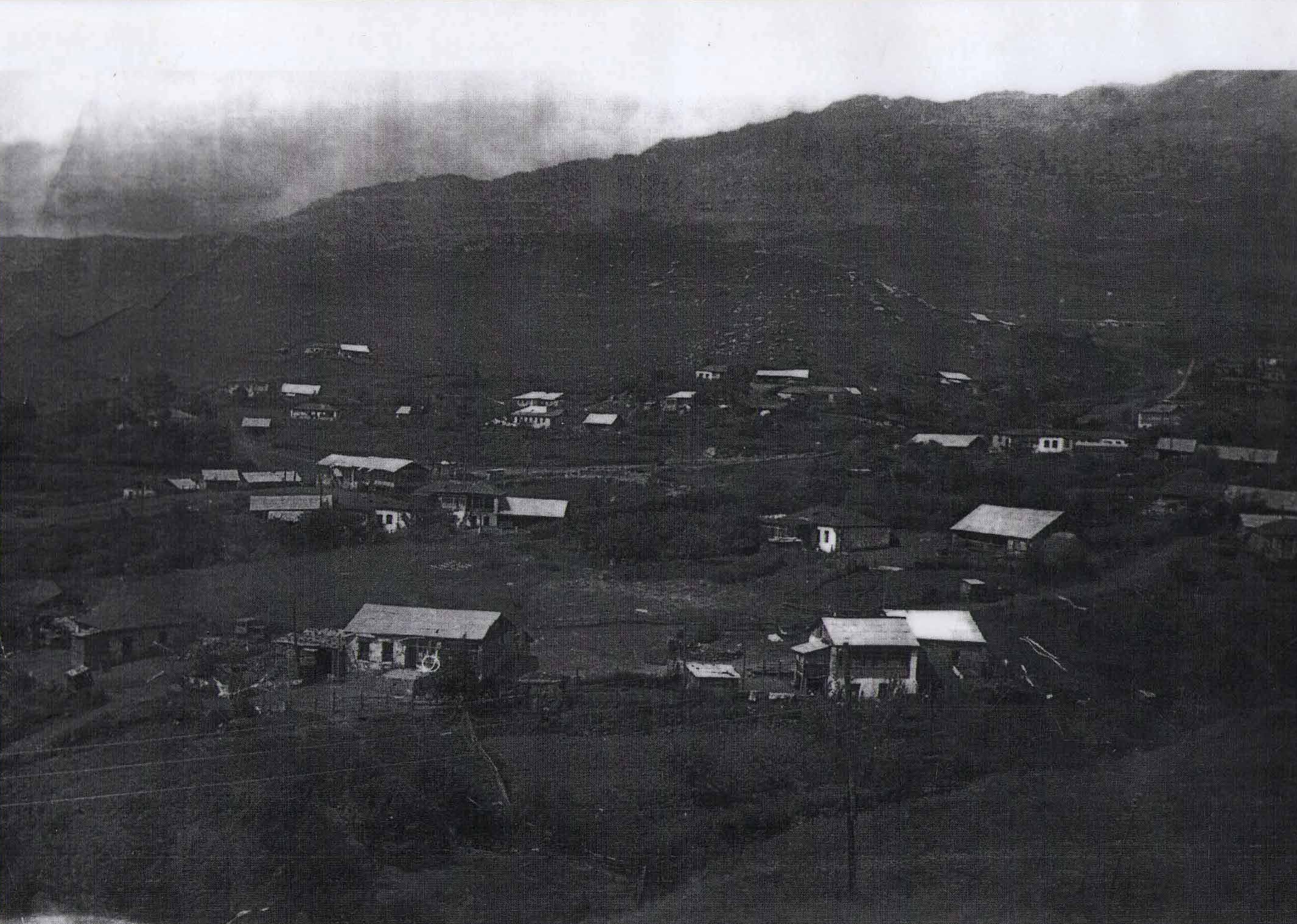
