= Gadabay District =

District of Azerbaijan

Coordinates: 40.5656°N 45.8161°E

- District
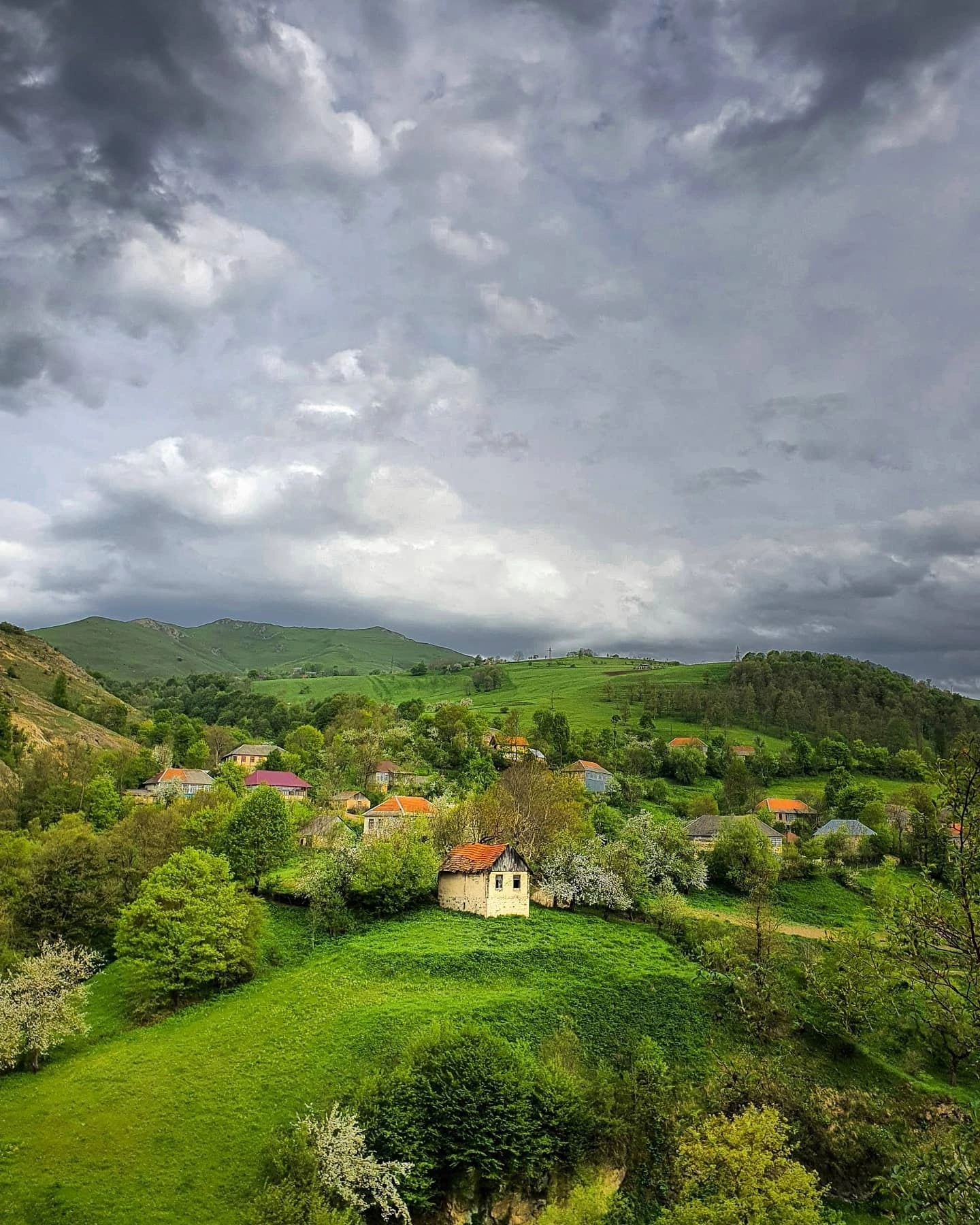

- Map of Azerbaijan showing Gadabay District
- Country: Azerbaijan
- Region: Gazakh-Tovuz
- Established: 8 August 1930
- Capital: Gadabay
- Settlements: 109

Government
  - Governor: Orkhan Mursalov

Area
  - Total: 1,230 km^{2} (470 sq mi)

Population (2020)
  - Total: 109,900
  - Density: 89.3/km^{2} (231/sq mi)
- Time zone: UTC+4 (AZT)
- Postal code: 2100
- Website: gedebey-ih.gov.az

Gadabay District (Azerbaijani: Gədəbəy rayonu) is one of the 66 districts of Azerbaijan. It is located in the west of the country and belongs to the Gazakh-Tovuz Economic Region. The district borders the districts of Dashkasan, Shamkir, Tovuz, and the Gegharkunik and Tavush provinces of Armenia. The Artsvashen exclave of Armenia is surrounded by the Gadabay District and is de facto controlled by Azerbaijan, administrated as part of Goranboy District. Its capital and largest city is Gadabay. As of 2020, the district had a population of 109,900.

== Etymology ==
The former name of Gadabay was Getabak. The Armenian historian of the XIII century Vardan Areveltsi mentions the toponym in the form Getabaks.

German philologist Heinrich Hübschmann hypothesized the toponym comes from the Armenian "get" (գետ) - river and "bak" (բակ) - yard.

== Geography ==
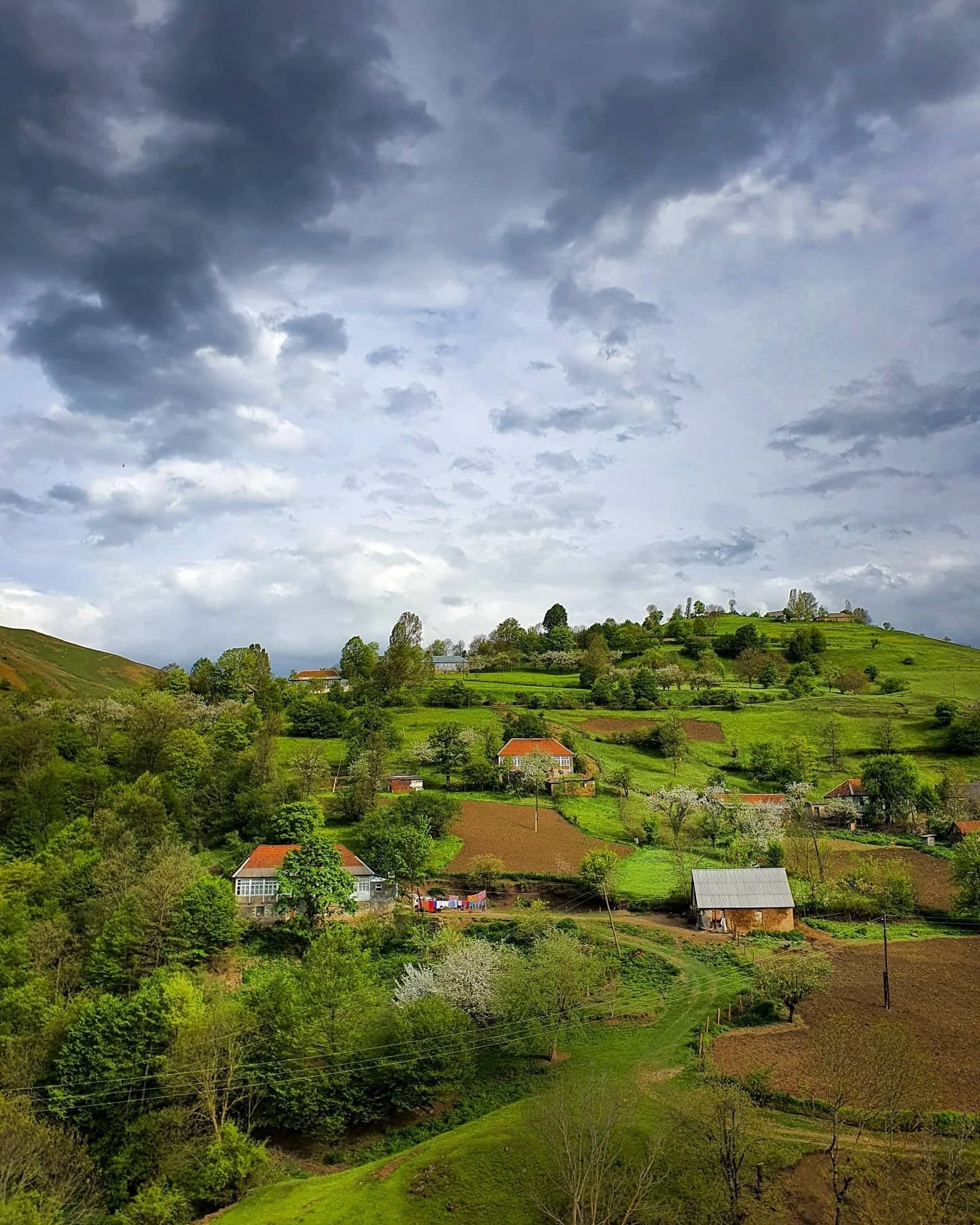
Gadabey Region

In the west, Azerbaijan's border upon Armenia stretches for a distance of 123 kilometres (76 mi).

Gadabay District is located in a zone of midlands and highlands of the Lesser Caucasus. Its territory includes the northern parts of Shahdagh Mount, a part of Bashkend-Dastafur concavity and Shamkir massif.

The highest heights are Goshabulag (3549m), Godzhadagh (2217m) and Garaarkhadzh (3549m).

The drainage of the district is significantly poor. Akhinja, Zayam and Shamkir are the largest rivers. Mountain-forest, mountain-meadow and other grounds spread here. Mountain shrubland and rare forest meadows in midlands, broad-leaved forests, subalpine and alpine meadows at the top of mountains occupy the greatest territory of the district.

Depositions of the Jurassic, Paleogene, Quaternary and other periods cover the surface of district. Gadabay district is rich of its underground resources such as gold, uranium, copper and other mineral resources. Goldfield in Soyudlu was explored by the Siemens brothers until arrival of Red Army soldiers in 1920. At present there is opened a factory producing gold, where work about 2000 workers. Gadabay District is also famous for its mineral waters, such as “Narzan”, “Mor-Mor”, “Chaldash”, “Turshsu” and “Soyudlu narzani” (in Soyudlu village).

Gadabay is within the middle and high mountain ranges of the Small Caucasus. The region of Gadabay covers the northern incline of the Shahdagh Ridge, the Bashkand-Dastafur basin and some part of the Shamkir mountain range. Goshabulak (3549 m.), Gocadagh (3317 m.) and others are the highest peaks. Within the area Jurassic, Tabashir, Paleogene and Anthropogenic sediments are spread. There are black and white marble stones. Summer is dry and there is mild heat and in the winter there is a dry mountainous tundra climate. The waterway network is tight. The Akhyncachay and Zayam waterways stream through this region. Within the south-western border of the area, the upper stream of Shamkirchay flows through. Gray mountain forest, meadow soils are spread. The region contains a well-known Red State Nature Reserve and four natural monuments - Govdu, Godakdara, Gamish and Shamlik. There is a beautiful waterfall at Kechidarasi cliff. Goat, sparrows, roe deer and Ayubbulaq as well as Chaldash, Gizilca Narzan, Mor-Mor mineral water springs can also be observed. Within the mountains, in the forests and valleys of the locale, animal and plant life is very rich. Gadabay locale is in the middle and high mountain ranges of the Small Caucasus. The district is located in the northern part of the Shahdagh ridge, the Bashkend-Dizafur depression and the Shamkir mountain range.

== History ==
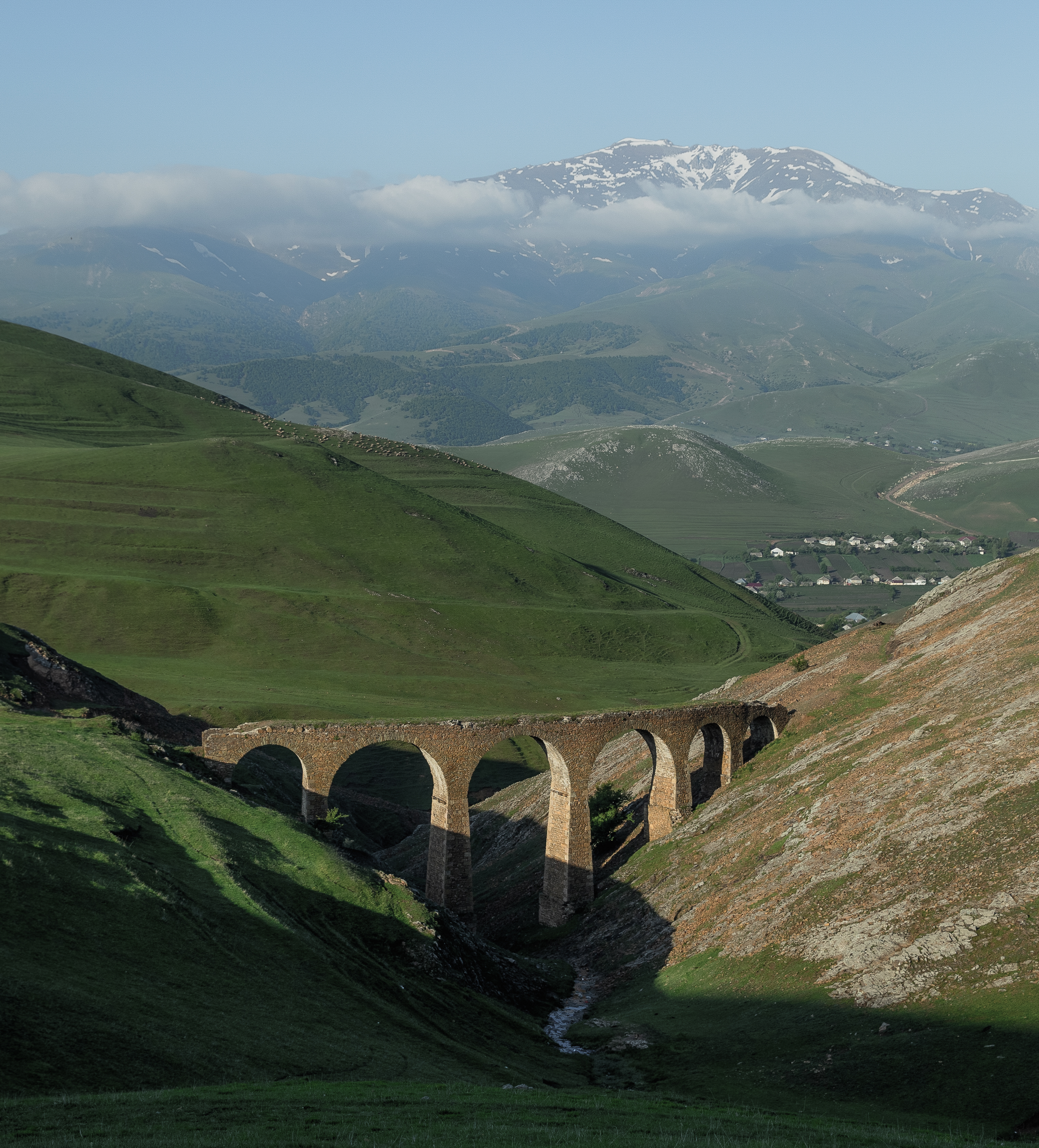
Gədəbəy - Siemens Bridge ( 1872)

As an administrative unit, Gadabay District originated on August 8, 1930, under the name of Rustam Aliyev. In 1938, it was renamed to Gadabay District.

In July 2020, Gadabay became a site for the clashes with Armenia.

== Geological structure ==
Jurassic, Tabashir, Paleogene and Anthropogenic sediments are spread. The granite-rich metamorphic rocks, Gadabayit, was first studied in Gadabay Copper-Cholerite bed (1903).

== Population ==
Population of the district by the year (at the beginning of the year, thsd. persons)
	2000	2001	2002	2003	2004	2005	2006	2007	2008	2009	2010	2011	2012	2013	2014	2015	2016	2017	2018	2019	2020	2021
Gadabay region	87,1	88,0	88,5	89,1	89,9	90,6	91,4	92,1	92,8	93,6	94,2	95,0	95,4	96,0	96,8	97,6	98,4	99,2	99,8	100,4	100,9	101,1
urban population	8,7	8,8	9,0	9,2	9,4	9,7	9,8	9,9	10,0	10,2	10,1	10,6	11,0	11,2	11,3	11,4	11,6	11,6	11,7	11,7	11,7	11,7
rural population	78,4	79,2	79,5	79,9	80,5	80,9	81,6	82,2	82,8	83,4	84,1	84,4	84,4	84,8	85,5	86,2	86,8	87,6	88,1	88,7	89,2	89,4

== Demographics ==
=== Ethnic groups ===
- Azerbaijanis 99.29%
- Other 0.71% (mostly ethnic Russians, some of whom belong to the Molokan and Doukhobor religious minorities, living in villages such as Slavyanka)

=== Religion ===
- Muslim 99.9%
- Other 0.1%

=== Language ===
- Azerbaijani Language 99%
- Russian 0.9%
- Other 0.1%
