= Zaritap Community =

Zaritap Զառիթափ
- Rural Community
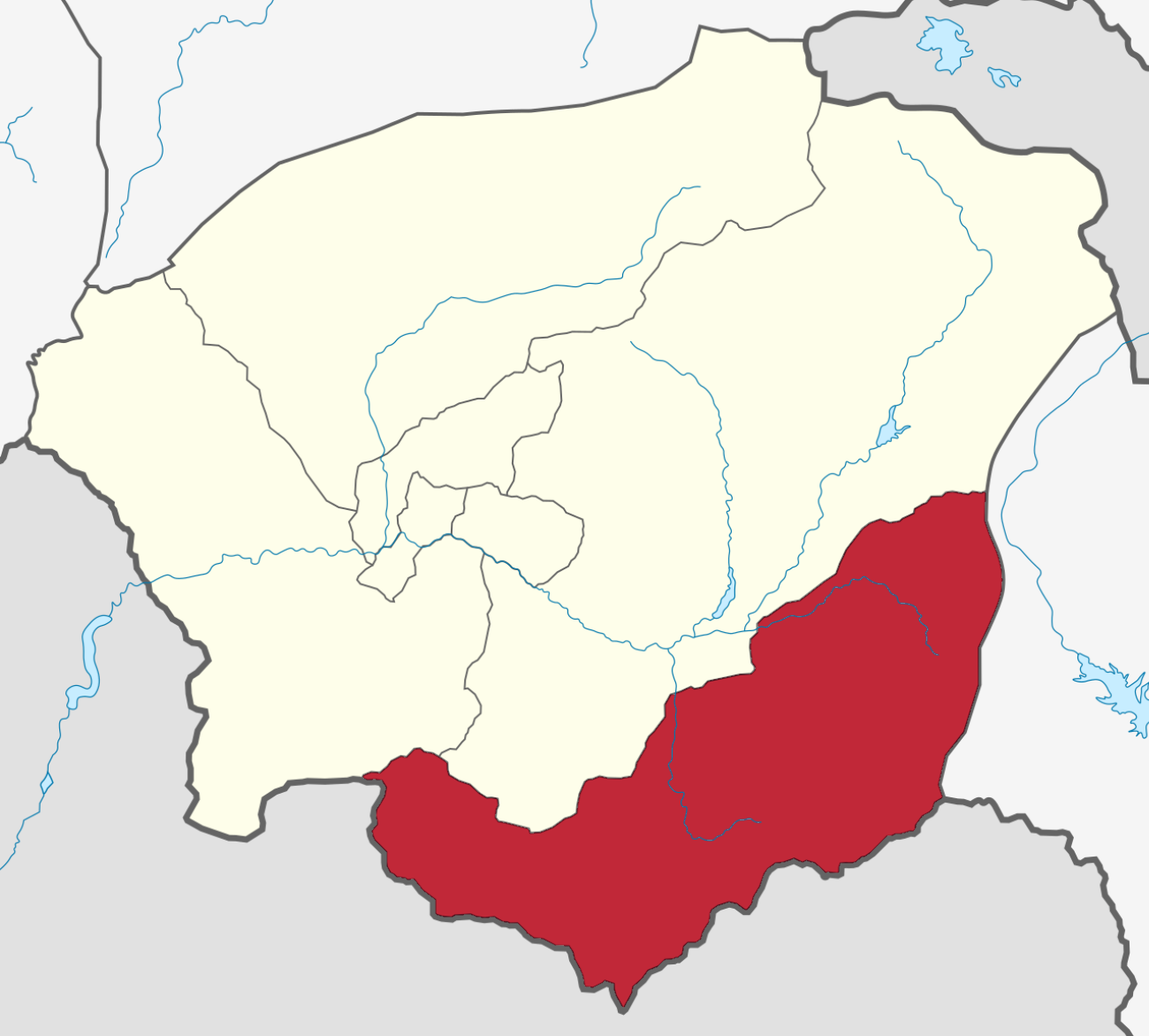
- Coordinates: 39°37′N 45°30′E
- Country: Armenia
- Province: Vayots Dzor
- Formed: 17 June 2016
- Administrative centre: Zaritap

Government
  - Mayor: Simon Babayan

Area
  - Total: 468 km^{2} (181 sq mi)

Population (2011 census)
  - Total: 3,906
  - Density: 8.35/km^{2} (21.6/sq mi)
- Time zone: AMT (UTC+04)
- Postal code: 3601–3810
- ISO 3166 code: AM-VD
- FIPS 10-4: AM10
- Website: www.zaritap.am

Zaritap Community (Armenian: Զառիթափ Համայնք Zaritap Hamaynk) is a rural community (municipality) and administrative subdivision of Vayots Dzor Province in southeastern Armenia, consisting of a group of villages whose administrative centre is at Zaritap.

== Villages ==
Settlement	Type	Population (2011 census)
Zaritap	Village, administrative centre	1,380
Artavan	Village	321
Bardzruni	Village	361
Gomk	Village	139
Kapuyt	Village	23
Khndzorut	Village	500
Martiros	Village	601
Nor Aznaberd	Village	126
Saravan	Village	245
Sers	Village	189
Ughedzor	Village	21
Akhta	Abandoned village	0
Horadis	Abandoned village	0

== See also ==
- Vayots Dzor Province
