= Azatek =

Azatek Ազատեկ
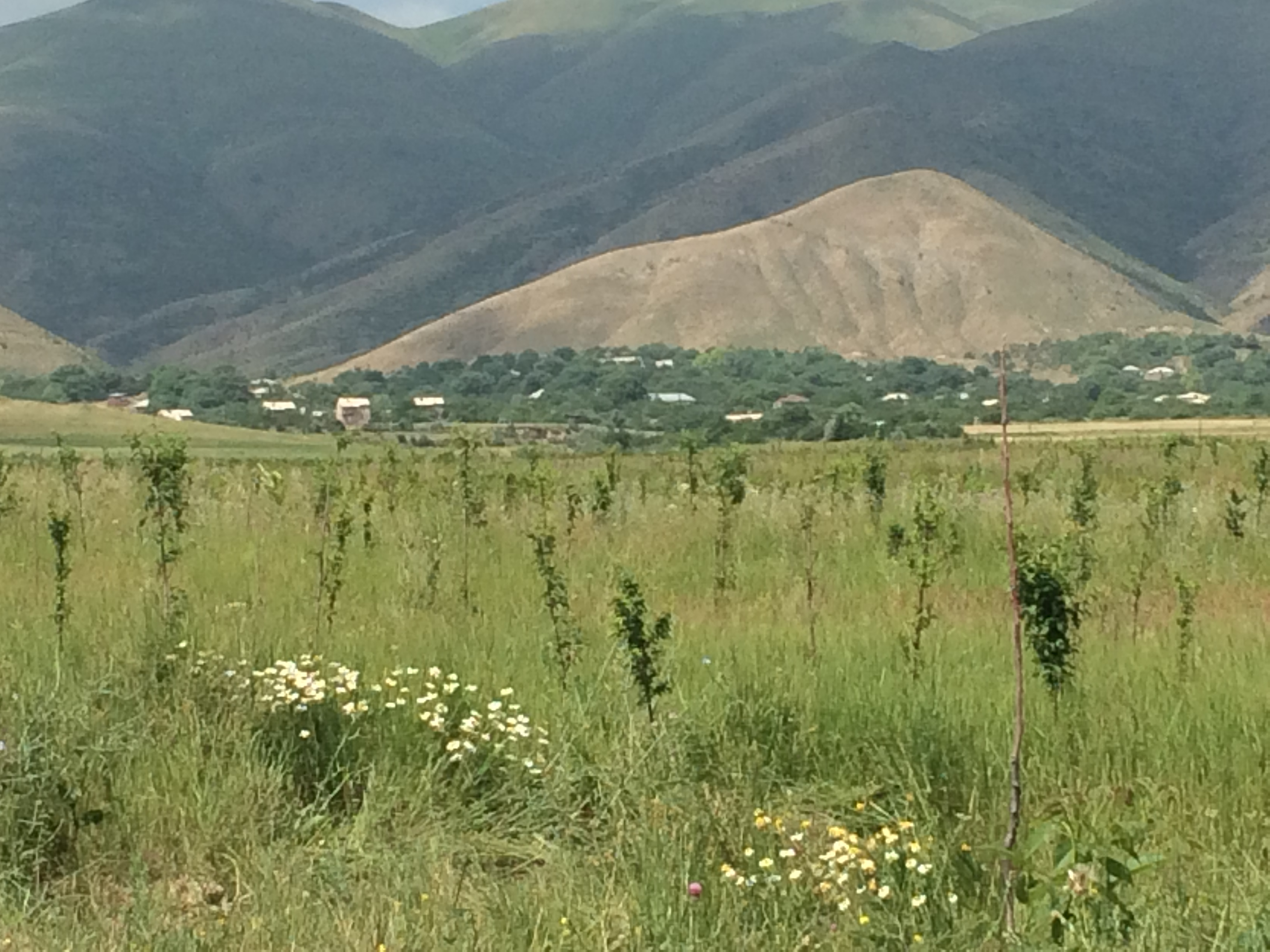

- Location within Armenia Location within Vayots Dzor
- Coordinates: 39°39′00″N 45°26′18″E
- Country: Armenia
- Province: Vayots Dzor
- Municipality: Vayk
- Elevation: 1,625 m (5,331 ft)

Population (2011)
  - Total: 603
- Time zone: UTC+4 (AMT)

Azatek (Armenian: Ազատեկ) is a village in the Vayk Municipality of the Vayots Dzor Province in Armenia, on the left bank of the Arpa River.

== History ==
The spring, located at the heart of the village, holds significant historical and cultural importance. It was a focal point for the Armenians who migrated from Khoy and Salmast and established the village in 1828.

According to archaeological findings, Azatek is believed to be the ancient Azat village.

In the past, it was a part of the Sharur-Daralayaz uezd of the Erivan Governorate and was known as Azadek.

== Historical heritage sites ==
The cultural heritage preserved in the village dates back to a specific historical era. Evidence of this can be found in the inscription engraved on the front stone at the entrance of St. Stepanos Church. According to the inscription, the church was initially constructed by the residents of Azatek during the period of Catholicos Hakob D of Jugha in the second half of the 17th century. Later on, in the 1830s, it was reconstructed by Armenian immigrants from Salmast (Iran). During this reconstruction, the villagers repaired the damaged roof and upper sections of the walls. The church incorporates ancient tombstones and khachkars (cross-stones) with partially preserved inscriptions, typical of the 13th and 14th centuries, which are integrated into the walls and pillars of the church.

Based on an inscription found in Amaghu-Noravank, Smbat Orbelian gifted the entire Azat village, along with its surrounding mountains and fields, to Noravank. The village has an ancient cemetery on its western side, where tombstones, mainly slabs, are mostly buried in the ground. In this cemetery, there are three khachkars placed on a natural boulder. These khachkars bear two crosses, a common style from the 13th to 14th centuries, but due to weathering over time, the inscriptions on them have become unreadable.

Two kilometers to the southwest of the village, at the mouth of the gorge, lies the St. Jacob pilgrimage site, inside which there is a grave. The epitaph on the grave indicates that it belongs to a certain Jacob and is dated back to 1607. Presumably, this is why the chapel-pilgrimage site was named St. Jacob. Just a short distance southeast of this chapel, on the hillside, there are three graves and a small carved khachkar nearby. It is believed that Grigor and his wife erected this khachkar in 1222 as a memorial for their son, the priest Hunan, whose grave lies there.

The fortress-castle of Saint Varvara, dating back to the first millennium BC, can be found southeast of the village. This castle held significant defensive importance during its time.

Within the Azatek village area, numerous chapels featuring khachkars from the 13th and 14th centuries can be found. Two of these chapels, St. Gevorg and St. Shoghakat, hold great historical and cultural significance. These chapels are renowned among the locals for their believed healing properties.

The village preserves the ancient ruins of "Smbataberd," an old fortress. Besides, there are several churches and chapels in the village, such as the St. Jacob Church (2 km to the west, built in 1623), St. Gevorg (3 km to the northeast, dating back to the 10th century), St. Varvara (1.5 km to the south), and St. John (2 km to the west, 19th century). Other notable sites include the "Barozhi" chapel (3 km to the northwest), the St. Shoghakat chapel (located in the eastern part of the village, 19th century), khachkars dating back to the 13th and 14th centuries, and the St. Enoch sanctuary from the 10th century.

== Geography ==
Surrounded by mountain ranges rich in flora and fauna, the village is 1625 meters above sea level. Azatek is located 24 km southeast of the Province center and 7 km away from the city of Vayk.

There is a well-maintained and winding road between Azatek and Vayk. The village shares its borders with the urban community of Vayk, which was once part of Azatek's territory. Additionally, it shares borders with the rural communities of Por, Martiros, Zaritap, Khndzorut, Gnishik, Agarakadzor, and Zedea.

Azatek covers an extensive area of 6596.38 hectares, including 831.37 hectares of arable land, 29.88 hectares of orchards, 61.90 hectares of grassland, 2578.43 hectares of pasture, and 3094.80 hectares of other land.

== Economy and culture ==
The population is mainly engaged in arable farming, horticulture, animal husbandry, and beekeeping. In the past, the village was also involved in silk weaving.

The village has a secondary school, a kindergarten, a house of culture, an administrative building, a medical station, and household service facilities. The village is gasified and has a complete telephone network.

== Demographics ==
Based on the 2011 Census of the Republic of Armenia, Azatek has a permanent population of 603 residents, with the current population standing at 525 individuals. The village has been inhabited by Armenians since 1831, with their ancestors having migrated from Salmast during 1828–1829.

The population dynamics of Azatek over the years:

Year	1831	1873	1897	1926	1959	1989	2001	2011
Population	166	559	751	660	638	576	600	603

== Gallery ==
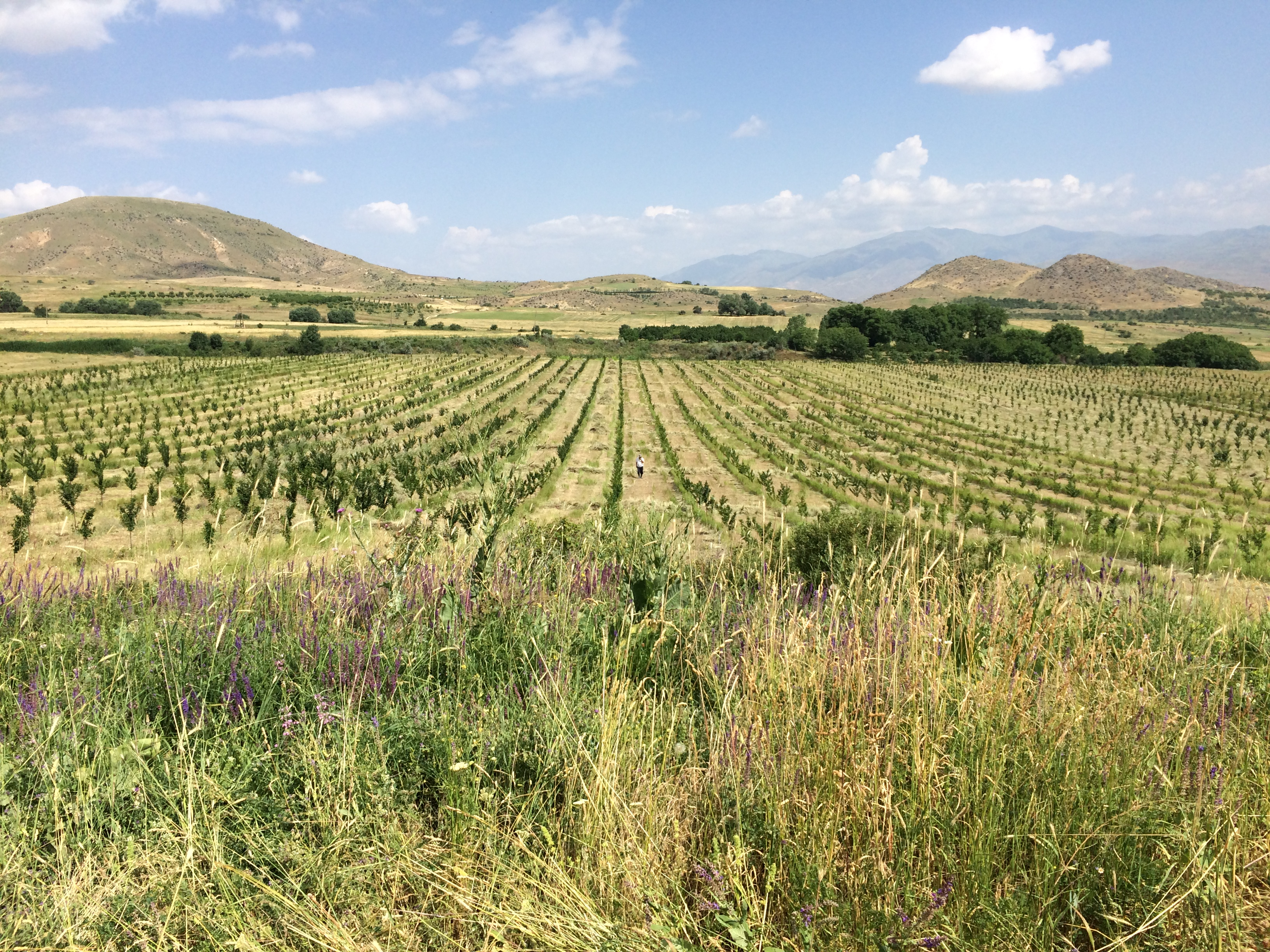
Orchards near Azatek
