= Kochbek =

Kochbek or Koch’bek’ may refer to:

- Qoçbəyli, Azerbaijan
- Ughedzor, Armenia
