= Gülüstan =

Gülüstan or Gioulistan or Gyulyustan or Gyulistan may refer to:

- Gülüstan, Goranboy, Azerbaijan
- Gülüstan, Nakhchivan, Azerbaijan
- Nor Aznaberd, Armenia
