= Kapuyt =

Kapuyt Կապույտ
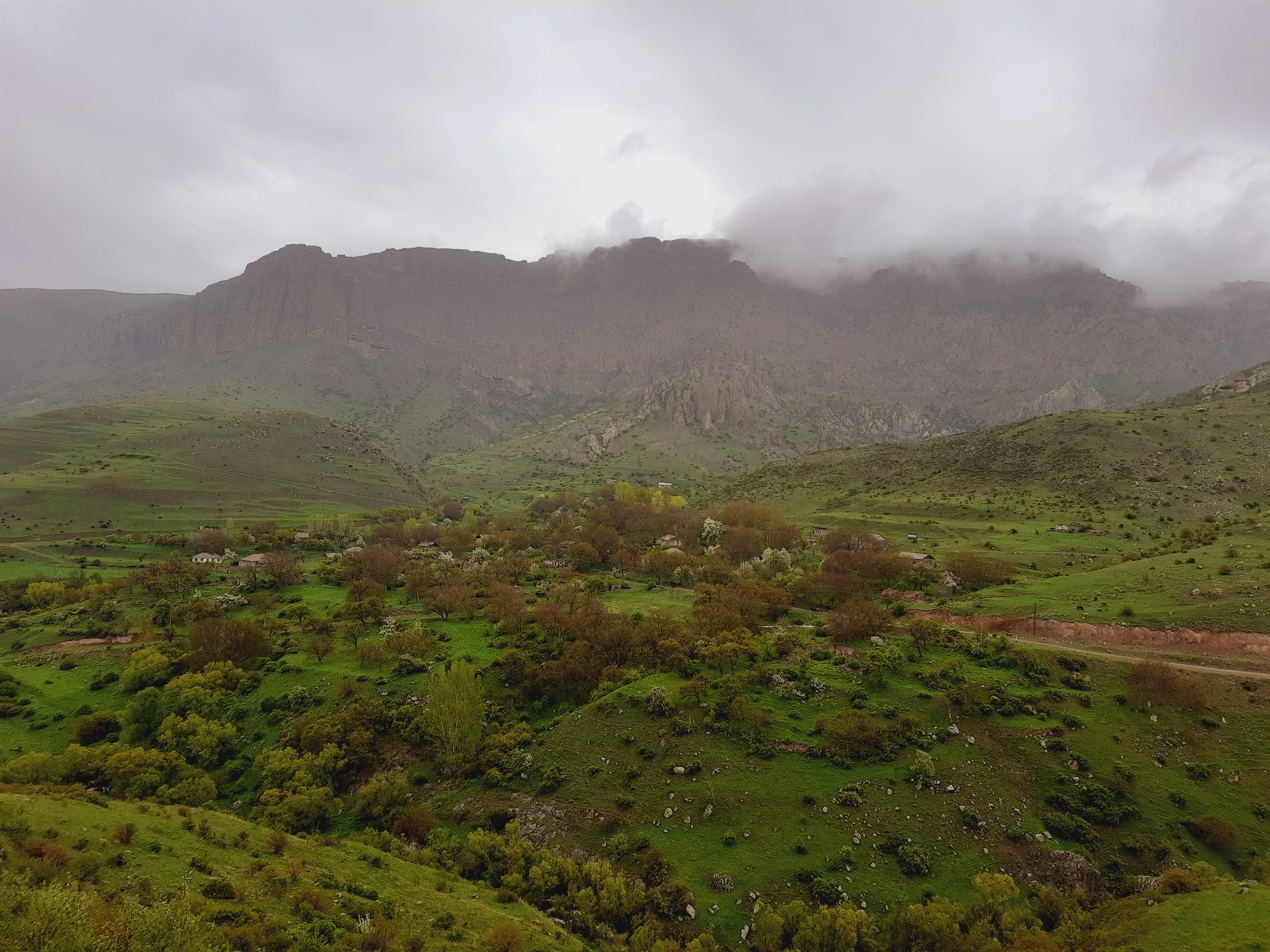

- Location within Armenia Location within Vayots Dzor
- Coordinates: 39°37′30″N 45°35′32″E
- Country: Armenia
- Province: Vayots Dzor
- Municipality: Vayk

Population (2011)
  - Total: 23
- Time zone: UTC+4 (AMT)

Kapuyt (Armenian: Կապույտ) is a village in the Vayk Municipality of the Vayots Dzor Province of Armenia.
