= Akhta, Vayots Dzor =

Akhta Ախտա
- Location within Armenia
- Coordinates: 39°38′41″N 45°33′54″E
- Country: Armenia
- Province: Vayots Dzor
- Municipality: Vayk

Population (2011)
  - Total: 1
- Time zone: UTC+4 (AMT)

Akhta (Armenian: Ախտա) is a village in the Vayk Municipality of the Vayots Dzor Province in Armenia.
