= Sers, Armenia =

Sers Սերս
- Location within Armenia Location within Vayots Dzor
- Coordinates: 39°33′46″N 45°28′47″E
- Country: Armenia
- Province: Vayots Dzor
- Municipality: Vayk

Population (2011)
  - Total: 189
- Time zone: UTC+4 (AMT)

Sers (Armenian: Սերս) is a village in the Vayk Municipality of the Vayots Dzor Province of Armenia.

== Etymology ==
The village is also known as Ses.

== History ==
The village was depopulated in 1604 during the rule of Abbas the Great of Persia. Later, in 1828, the Armenian population of the Salmas province of Persia emigrated and settled in the village.
