= Saravan, Armenia =

Saravan Սարավան
- Location within Armenia Location within Vayots Dzor
- Coordinates: 39°43′08″N 45°38′54″E
- Country: Armenia
- Province: Vayots Dzor
- Municipality: Vayk

Population (2011)
  - Total: 245
- Time zone: UTC+4 (AMT)

Saravan (Armenian: Սարավան) is a village in the Vayk Municipality of the Vayots Dzor Province of Armenia.
