= Gomk =

Gomk Գոմք
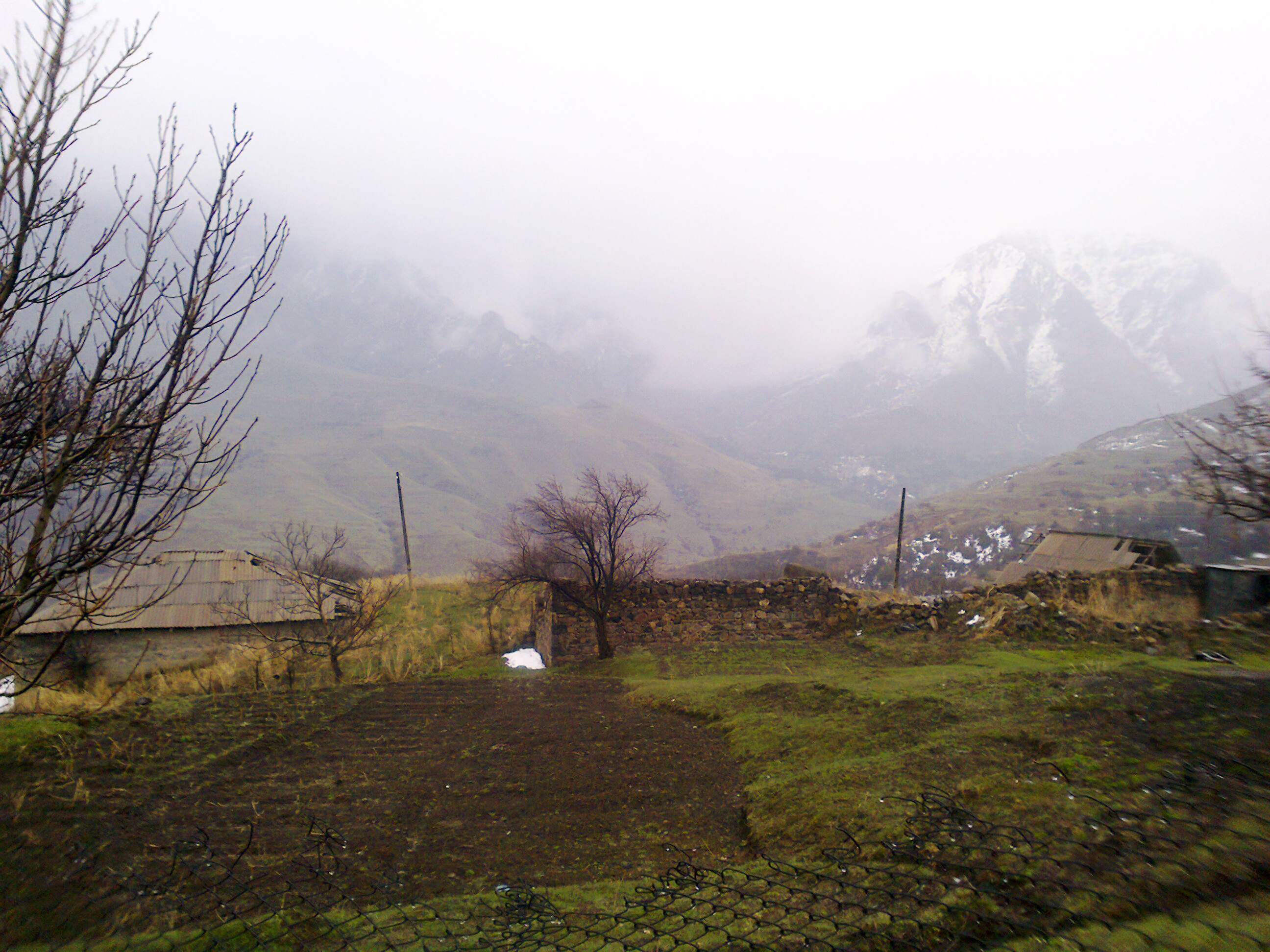

- Location within Armenia Location within Vayots Dzor
- Coordinates: 39°37′46″N 45°34′09″E
- Country: Armenia
- Province: Vayots Dzor
- Municipality: Vayk

Population (2011)
  - Total: 162
- Time zone: UTC+4 (AMT)

Gomk (Armenian: Գոմք) is a village in the Vayk Municipality of the Vayots Dzor Province of Armenia.

== History ==
There is a 17th-century church, and a shrine/khachkar from 1263 in the village. The inscription upon it reads:

"In 712 of the Armenian era, under the pious Prince Prosh, Mkhitar, Arevik, son of Khoidan, set up this cross and chapel. In the village there was not even a church. We have built this church with our own means with much trouble, for us and our parents. You who read, remember us in your prayers."

== Gallery ==
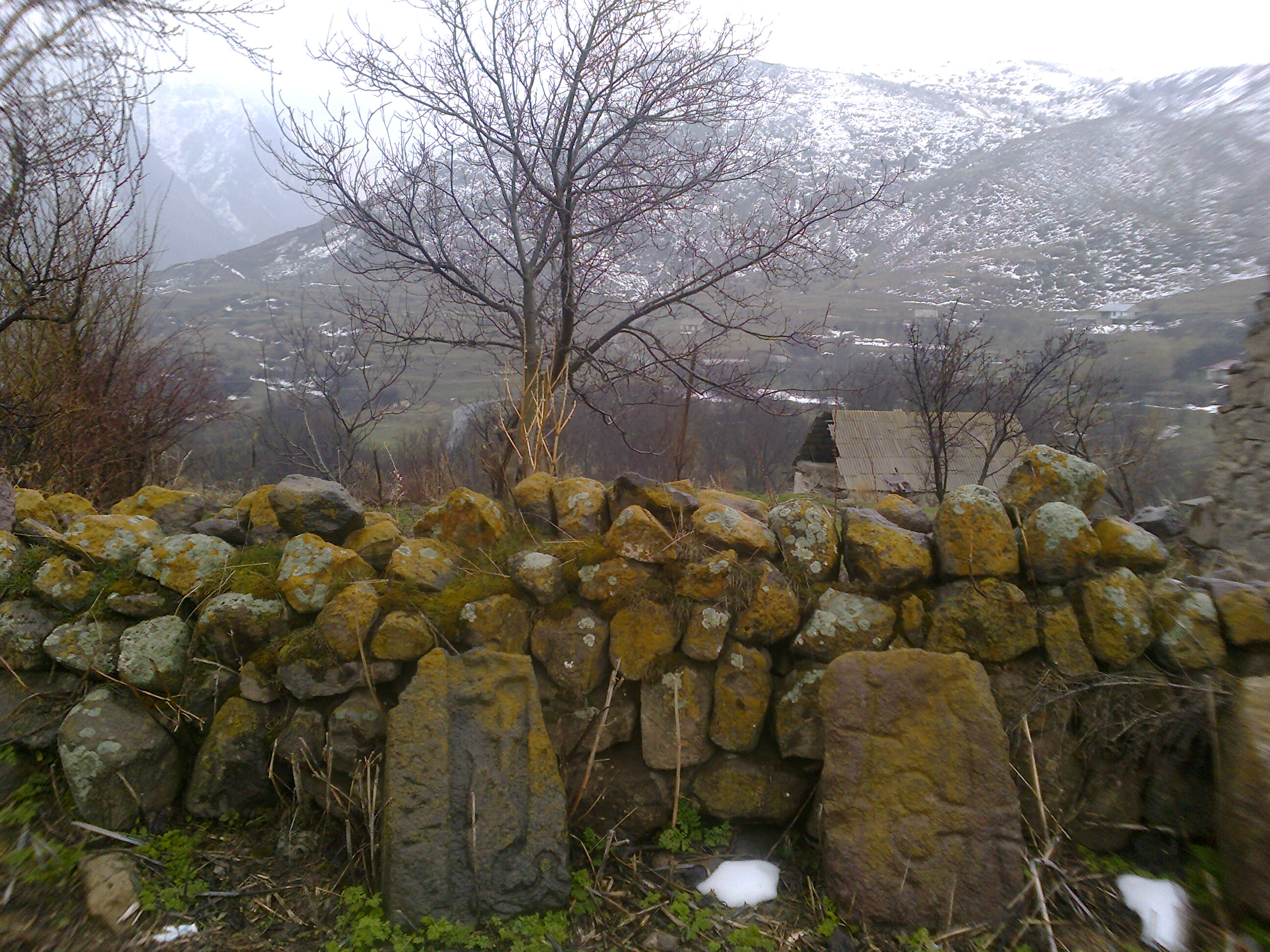
Scenery around Gomk

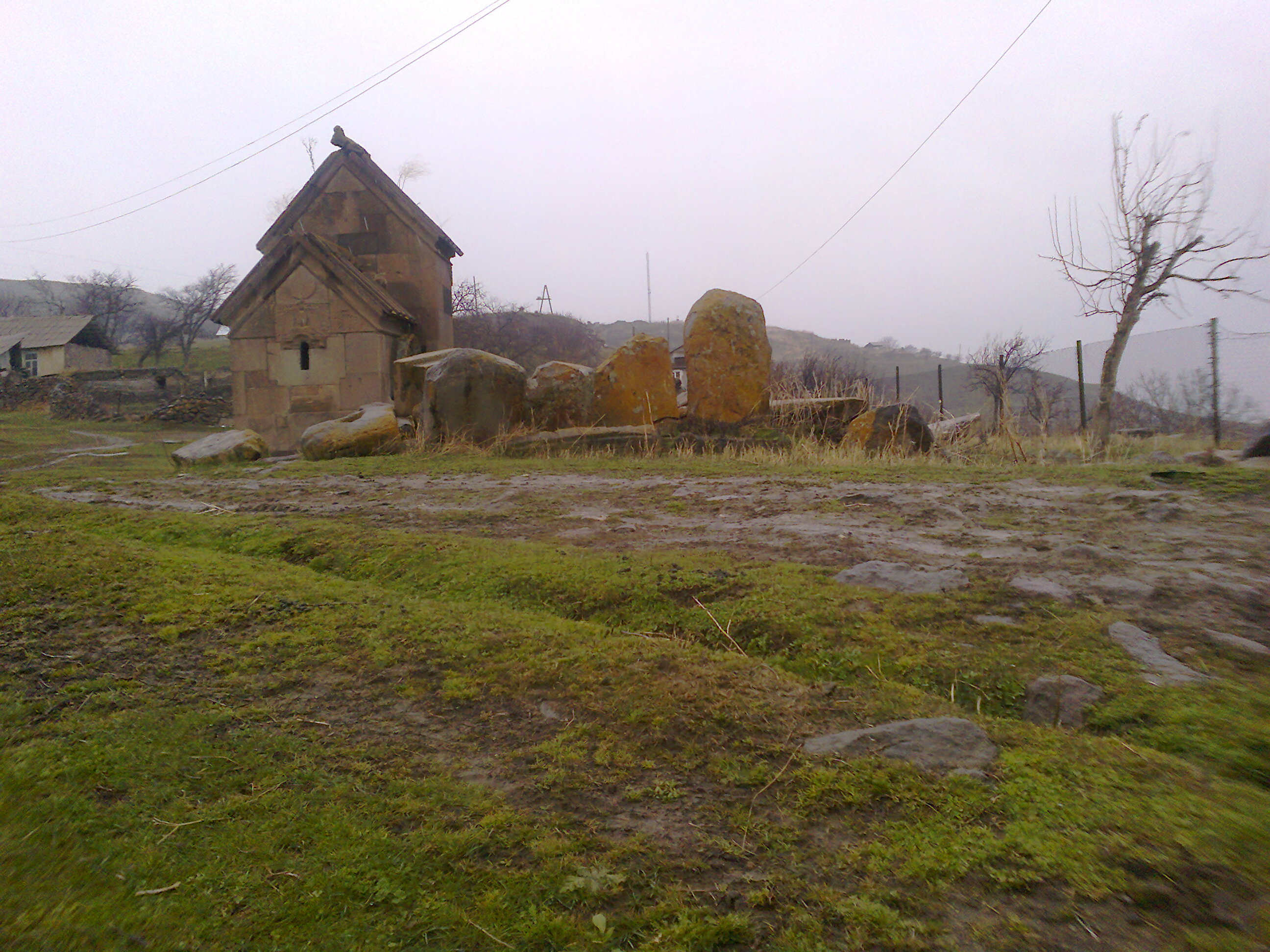
Khachkar chapel in Gomk

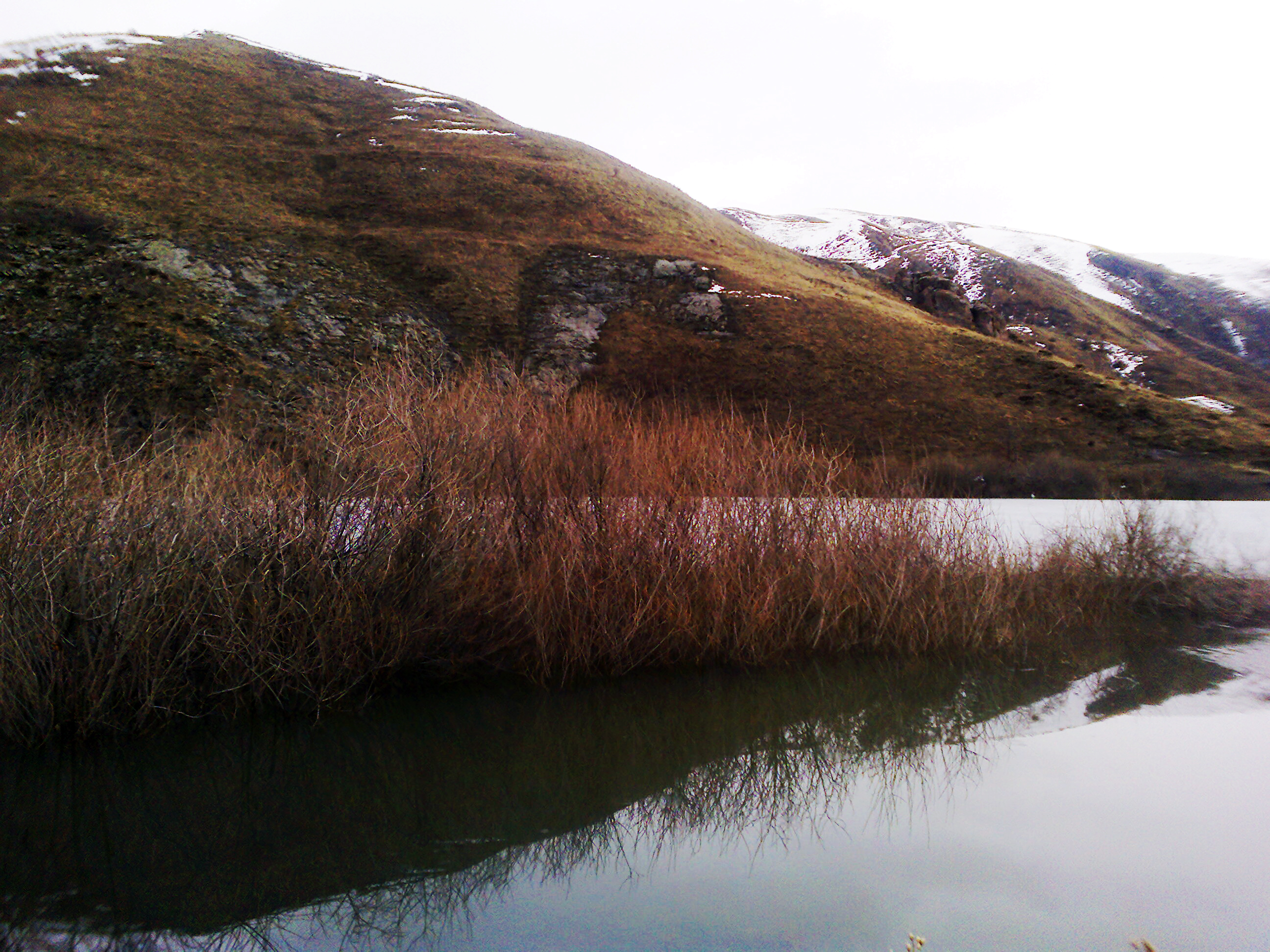
Lake near Gomk

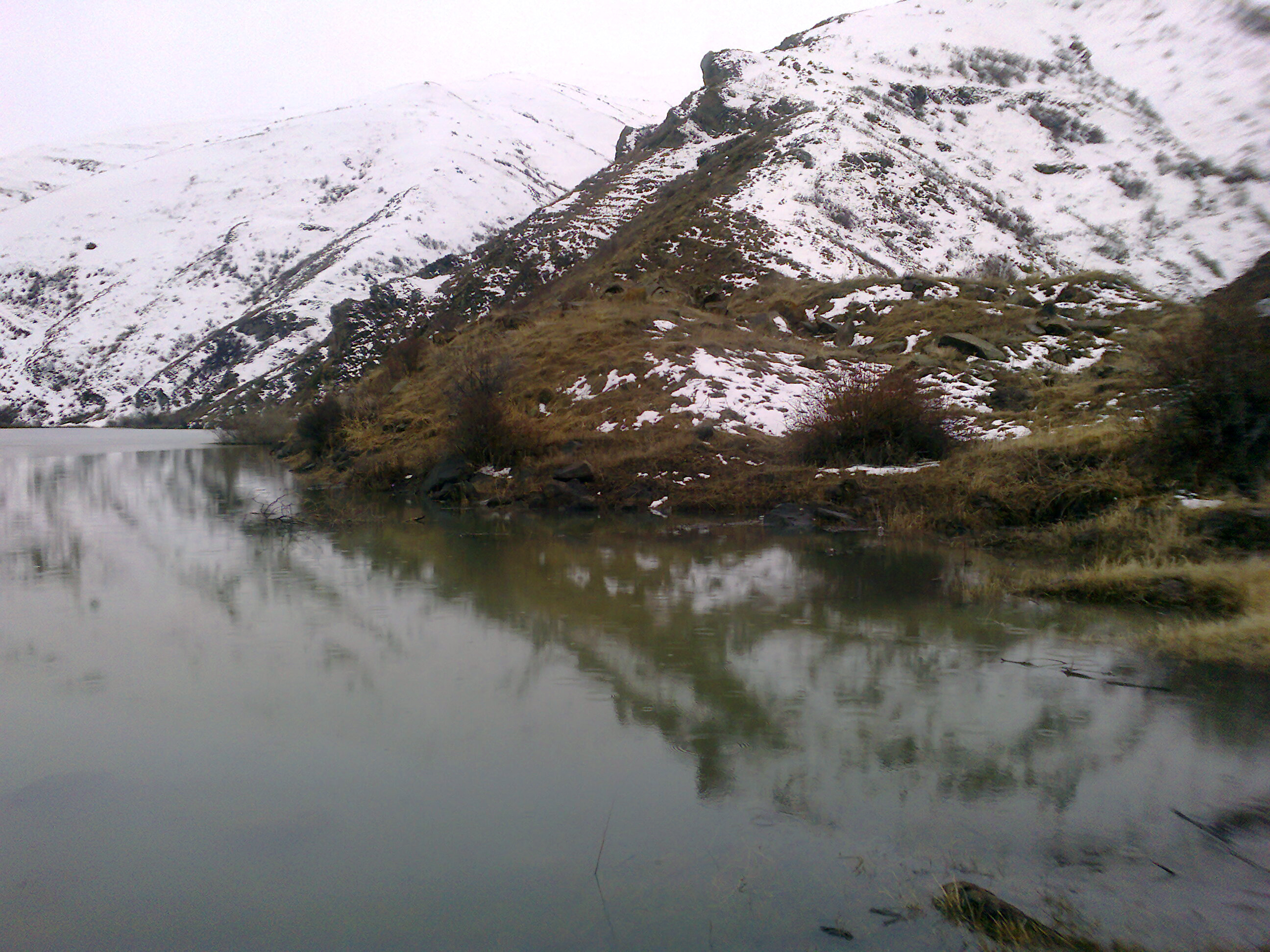
Lake near Gomk

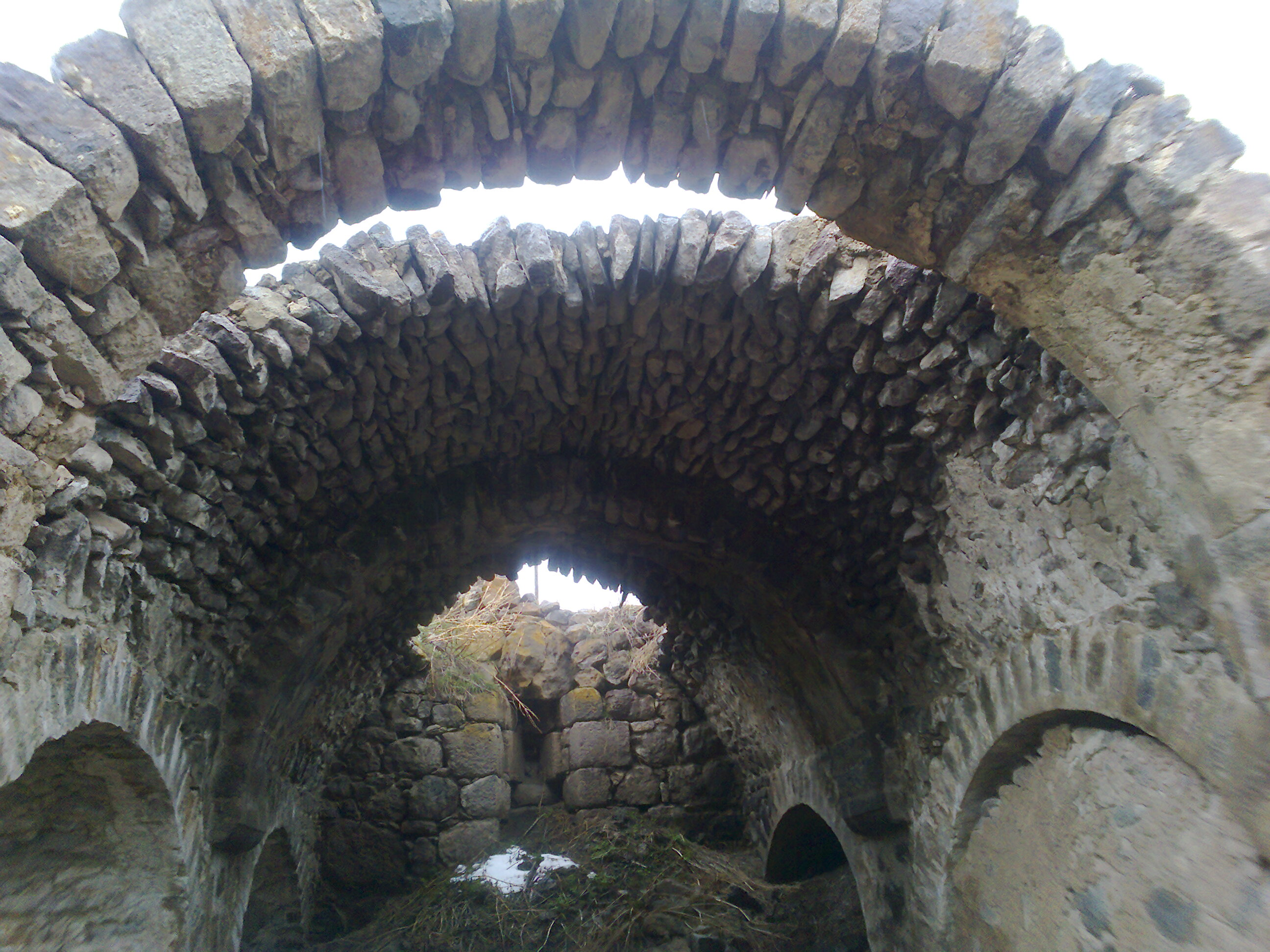
Church
