= Arin, Armenia =

Arin Արին
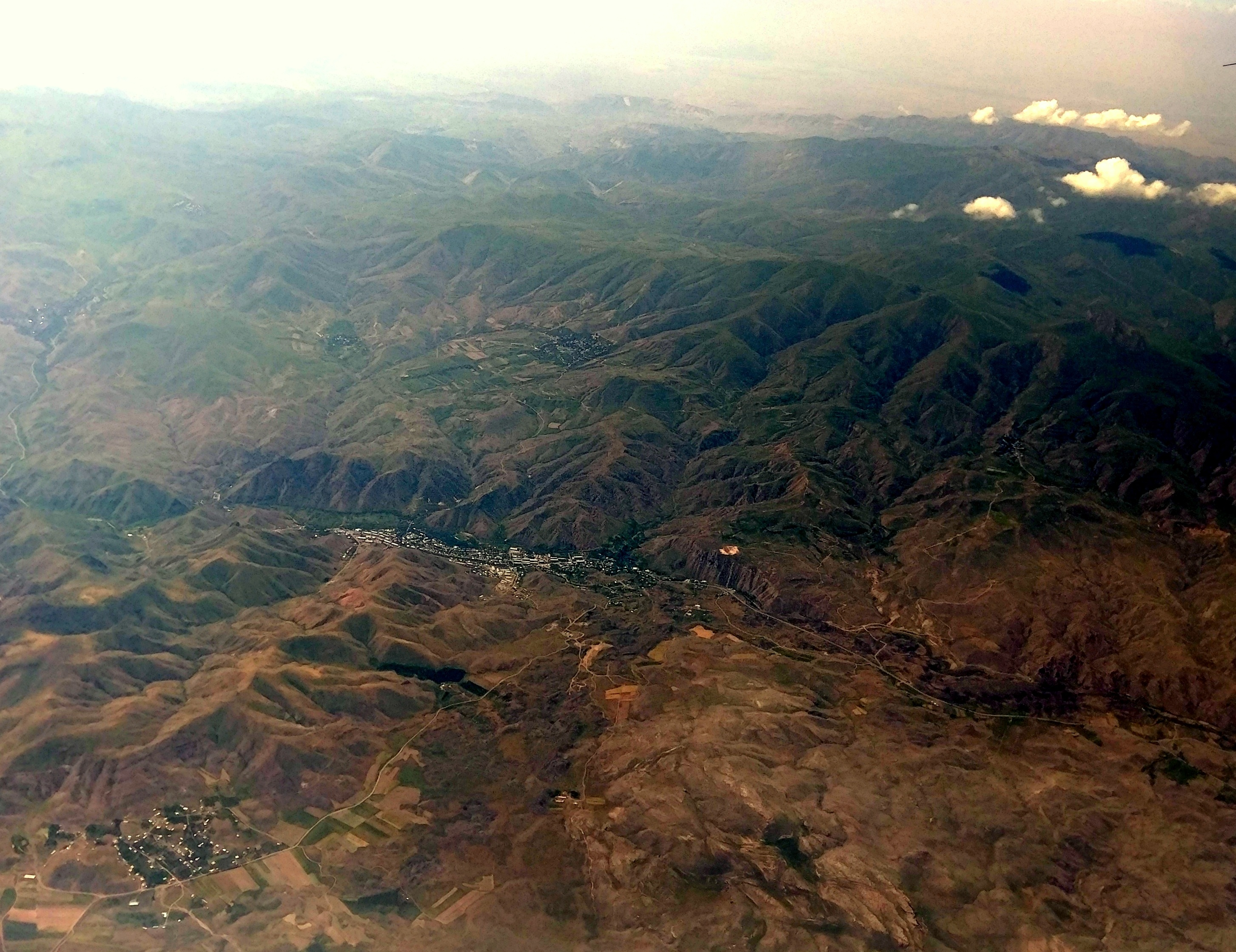
- Aerial view of Vayots Dzor, Arin in the foreground

- Location within Armenia Location within Vayots Dzor
- Coordinates: 39°43′38″N 45°29′38″E
- Country: Armenia
- Province: Vayots Dzor
- Municipality: Vayk
- Elevation: 1,630 m (5,350 ft)

Population (2011)
  - Total: 309
- Time zone: UTC+4 (AMT)

Arin (Armenian: Արին) is a village in the Vayk Municipality of the Vayots Dzor Province of Armenia.

== Toponymy ==
The village was renamed Arin in 1978.

== History ==
The village was founded in the mid-19th century upon an older site.
