= Khndzorut, Vayots Dzor =

Khndzorut Խնձորուտ
- Location within Armenia Location within Vayots Dzor
- Coordinates: 39°33′58″N 45°22′37″E
- Country: Armenia
- Province: Vayots Dzor
- Municipality: Vayk

Population (2011)
  - Total: 500
- Time zone: UTC+4 (AMT)

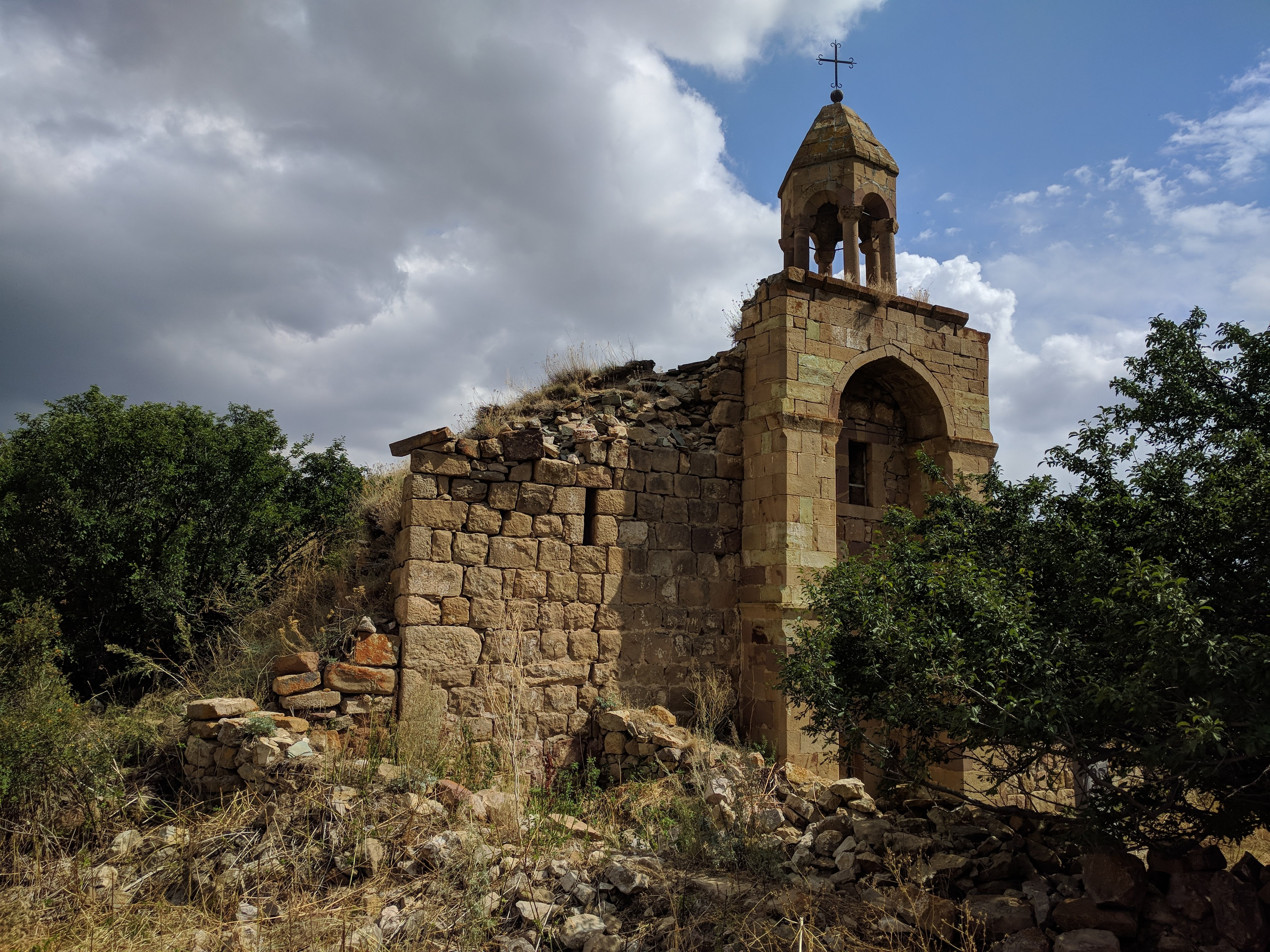

Khndzorut (Armenian: Խնձորուտ, lit. 'appletree orchard') is a village in the Vayk Municipality of the Vayots Dzor Province of Armenia. The village is located close to the Armenia–Azerbaijan border. Northwest to the village is the abandoned site of Horadis, with a church from 1668.

== Etymology ==
The village was previously known as Almalu and Elmalu until 1946.
