= Artavan =

Artavan Արտավան
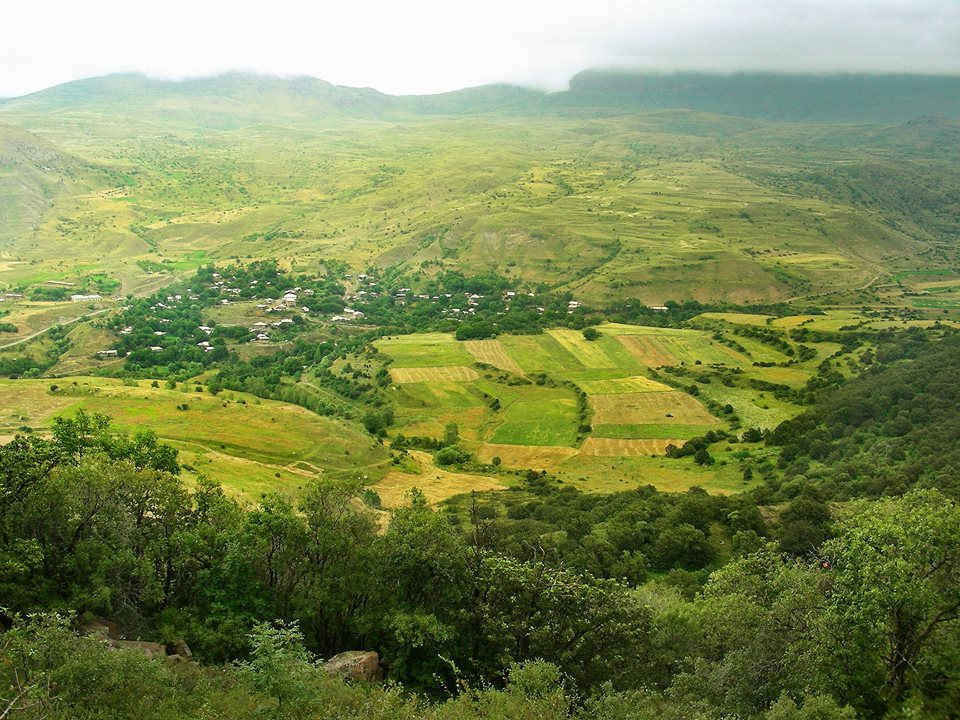

- Location within Armenia Location within Vayots Dzor
- Coordinates: 39°39′27″N 45°37′00″E
- Country: Armenia
- Province: Vayots Dzor
- Municipality: Vayk

Population (2011)
  - Total: 321
- Time zone: UTC+4 (AMT)

Artavan (Armenian: Արտավան) is a village in the Vayk Municipality of the Vayots Dzor Province of Armenia.

== Toponymy ==
The village was previously known as Dzhul.

== History ==
The village was probably at one time a fief of Tatev. There is an 18th-century bridge and an old cemetery in the vicinity of the village.

== Gallery ==
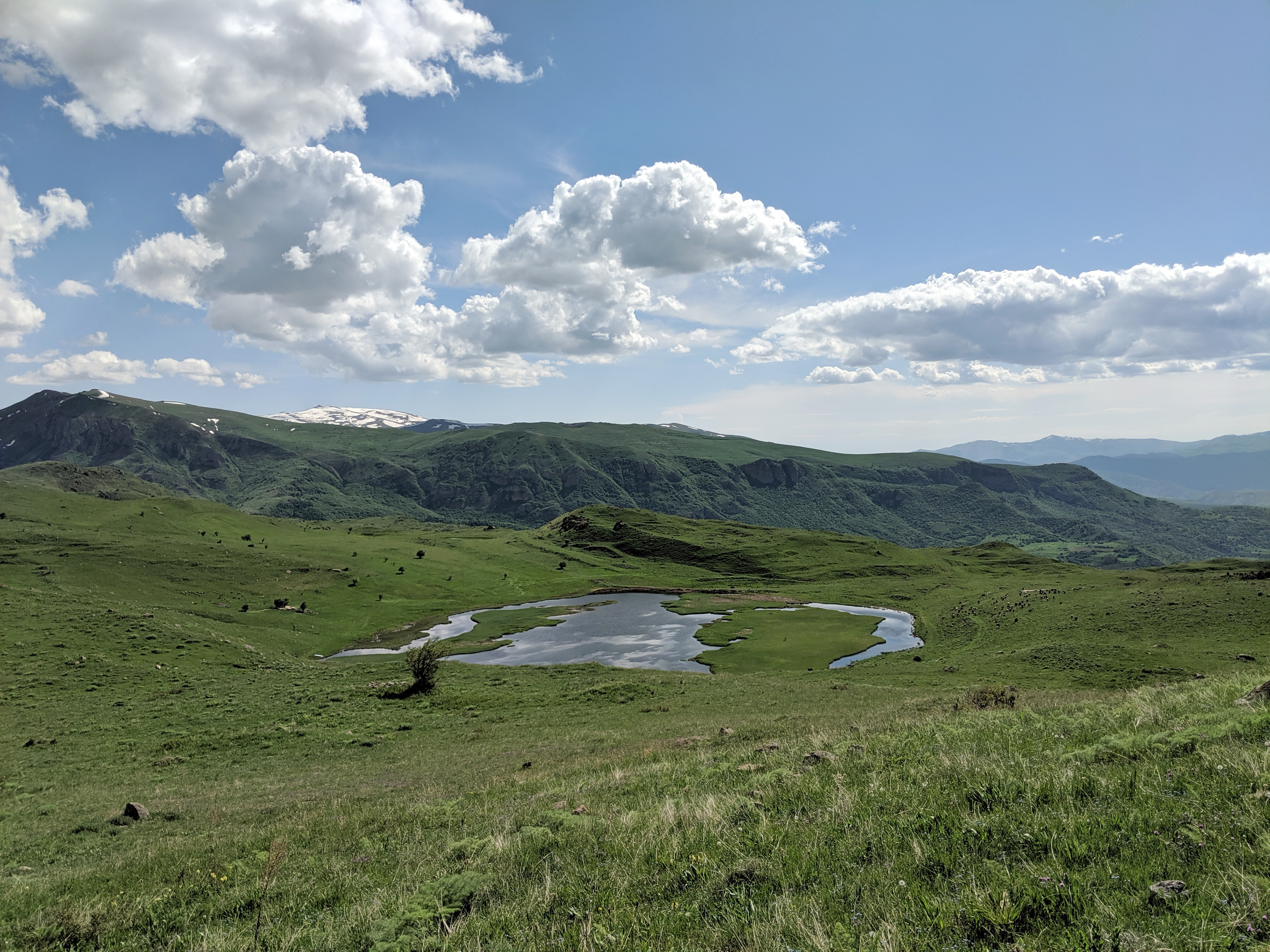

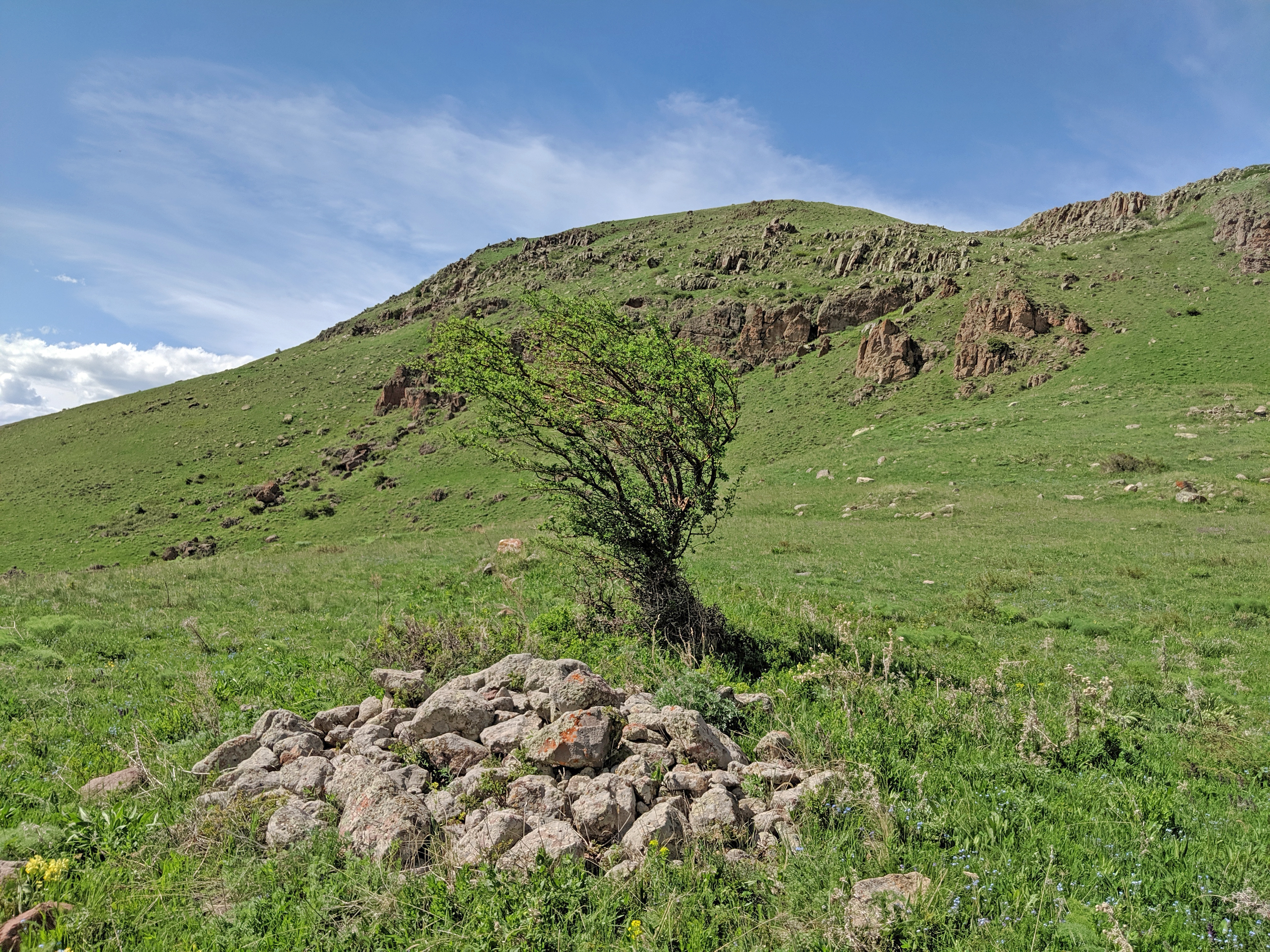

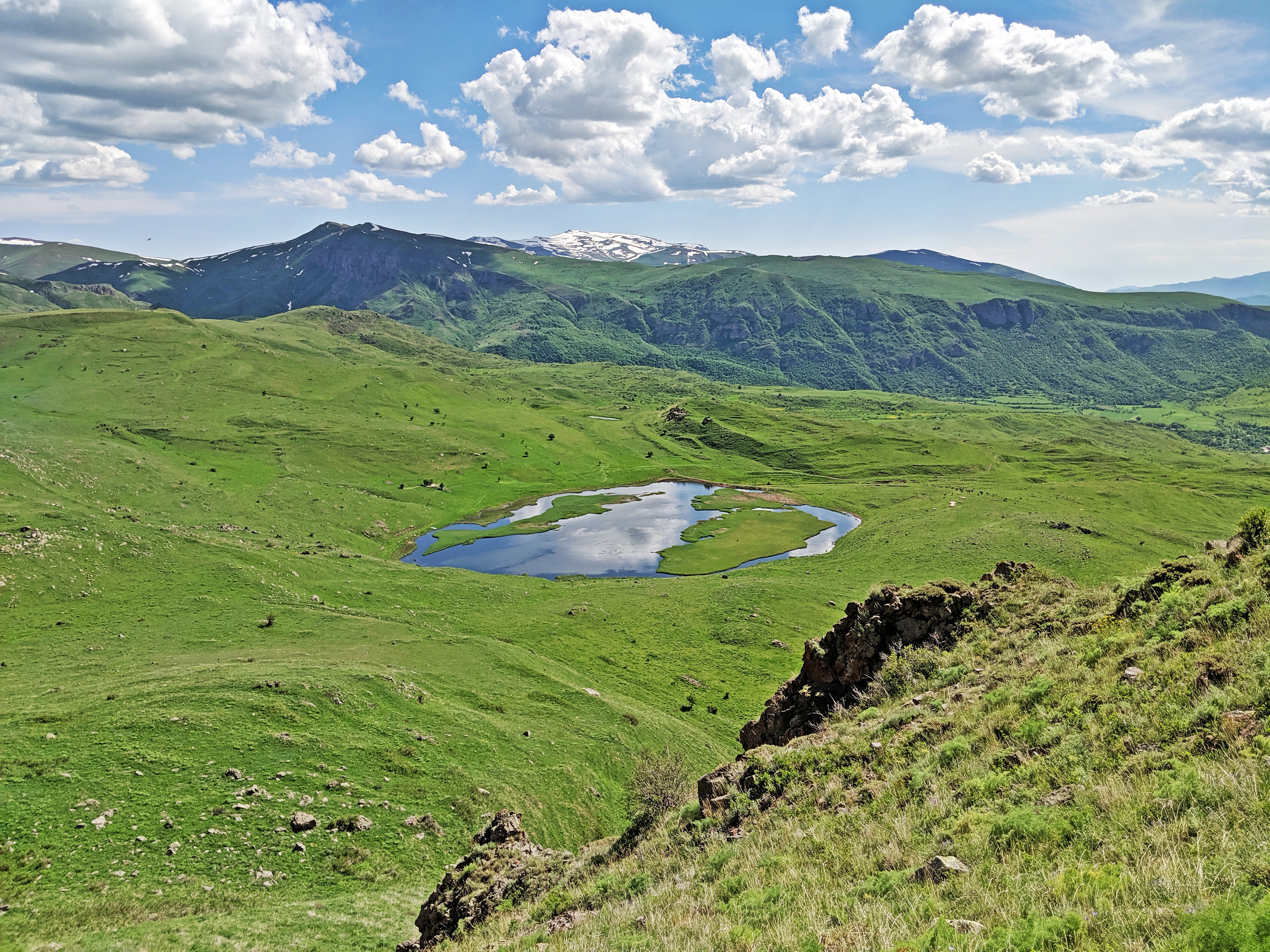

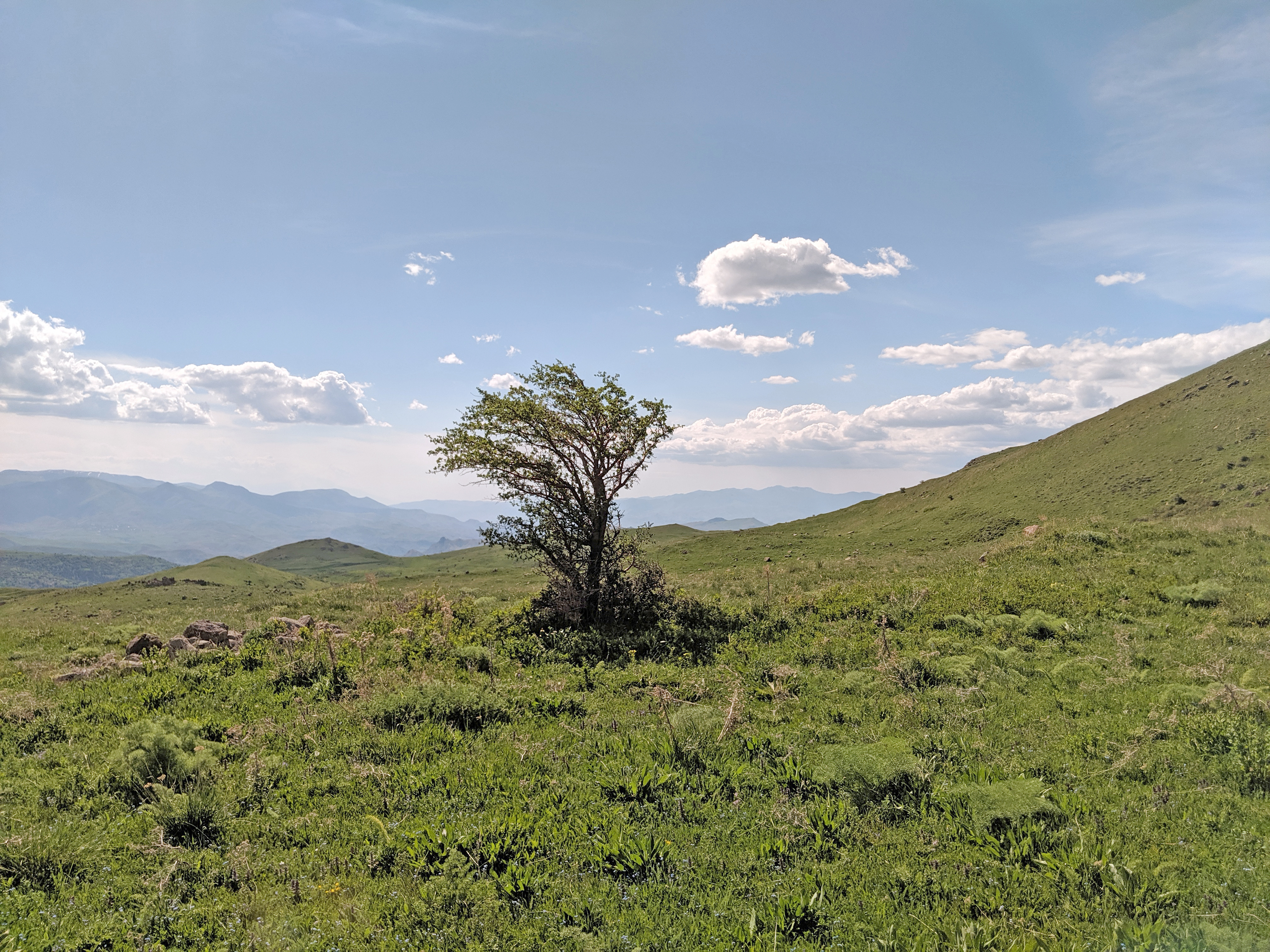
