= Ughedzor =

Ughedzor Ուղեձոր
- Location within Armenia Location within Vayots Dzor
- Coordinates: 39°41′13″N 45°40′46″E
- Country: Armenia
- Province: Vayots Dzor
- Municipality: Vayk

Population (2011)
  - Total: 21
- Time zone: UTC+4 (AMT)

Ughedzor (Armenian: Ուղեձոր) is a village in the Vayk Municipality of the Vayots Dzor Province of Armenia.

== Climate ==
Ughedzor is near the summit of Vorotan Pass, where there is a weather station.

Climate data for Vorotan Pass, Vayk, 1991–2020 normals: 2387m
Month	Jan	Feb	Mar	Apr	May	Jun	Jul	Aug	Sep	Oct	Nov	Dec	Year
Record high °C (°F)	9.6 (49.3)	7.0 (44.6)	10.5 (50.9)	21.5 (70.7)	24.3 (75.7)	26.6 (79.9)	30.0 (86.0)	30.2 (86.4)	27.8 (82.0)	20.3 (68.5)	14.2 (57.6)	14.5 (58.1)	30.2 (86.4)
Mean daily maximum °C (°F)	0.7 (33.3)	1.4 (34.5)	5.6 (42.1)	12.3 (54.1)	17.5 (63.5)	22.1 (71.8)	24.4 (75.9)	26.3 (79.3)	23.4 (74.1)	17.4 (63.3)	9.2 (48.6)	3.1 (37.6)	13.6 (56.5)
Daily mean °C (°F)	−8.1 (17.4)	−7.3 (18.9)	−3.6 (25.5)	1.7 (35.1)	7.3 (45.1)	11.6 (52.9)	13.8 (56.8)	14.5 (58.1)	11.7 (53.1)	6.3 (43.3)	−1.1 (30.0)	−6.0 (21.2)	3.4 (38.1)
Mean daily minimum °C (°F)	−17.4 (0.7)	−16.6 (2.1)	−12.6 (9.3)	−8.3 (17.1)	−1.3 (29.7)	3.8 (38.8)	6.1 (43.0)	6.7 (44.1)	2.0 (35.6)	−3.7 (25.3)	−10.4 (13.3)	−14.6 (5.7)	−5.5 (22.1)
Record low °C (°F)	−24.4 (−11.9)	−23.5 (−10.3)	−20.1 (−4.2)	−16.3 (2.7)	−6.6 (20.1)	−0.2 (31.6)	2.1 (35.8)	3.4 (38.1)	−4.8 (23.4)	−9.0 (15.8)	−15.4 (4.3)	−20.4 (−4.7)	−24.4 (−11.9)
Average precipitation mm (inches)	47.4 (1.87)	46.5 (1.83)	49.0 (1.93)	71.0 (2.80)	79.6 (3.13)	57.9 (2.28)	40.1 (1.58)	23.8 (0.94)	25.0 (0.98)	42.2 (1.66)	44.5 (1.75)	46.4 (1.83)	573.4 (22.58)
Average precipitation days (≥ 1.0 mm)	8.1	8.2	9.3	10.5	12.5	8.1	5.3	3.5	3.9	7.0	7.1	8.5	92
Source: NOAA
