= Martiros, Vayots Dzor =

Martiros Մարտիրոս
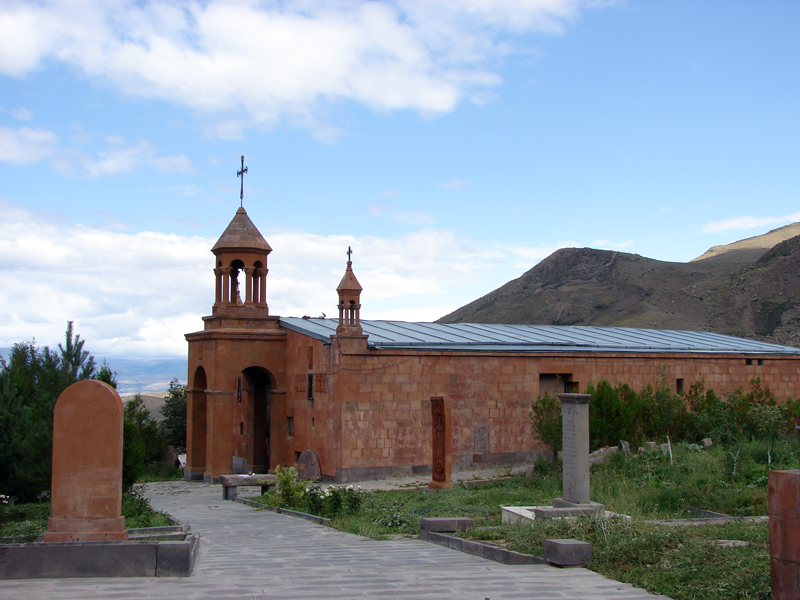
- The village church

- Location within Armenia Location within Vayots Dzor
- Coordinates: 39°35′48″N 45°30′28″E
- Country: Armenia
- Province: Vayots Dzor
- Municipality: Vayk

Population (2011)
  - Total: 601
- Time zone: UTC+4 (AMT)

Martiros (Armenian: Մարտիրոս) is a village in the Vayk Municipality of the Vayots Dzor Province of Armenia. There is a newer and an older section to the village.

== History ==
A huge khachkar in the older section of the village attests that the settlement was founded in 1283 at the command of Prince Prosh and his son Paron Hasan.

According to the testimony of Stepanos Orbelian, the village has borne its present name, Martiros, since 462 AD and has never been renamed since then. Before that period, the settlement was known by a different name. In addition, in 1283, the village was re-established by the Proshyan princes.

== Gallery ==
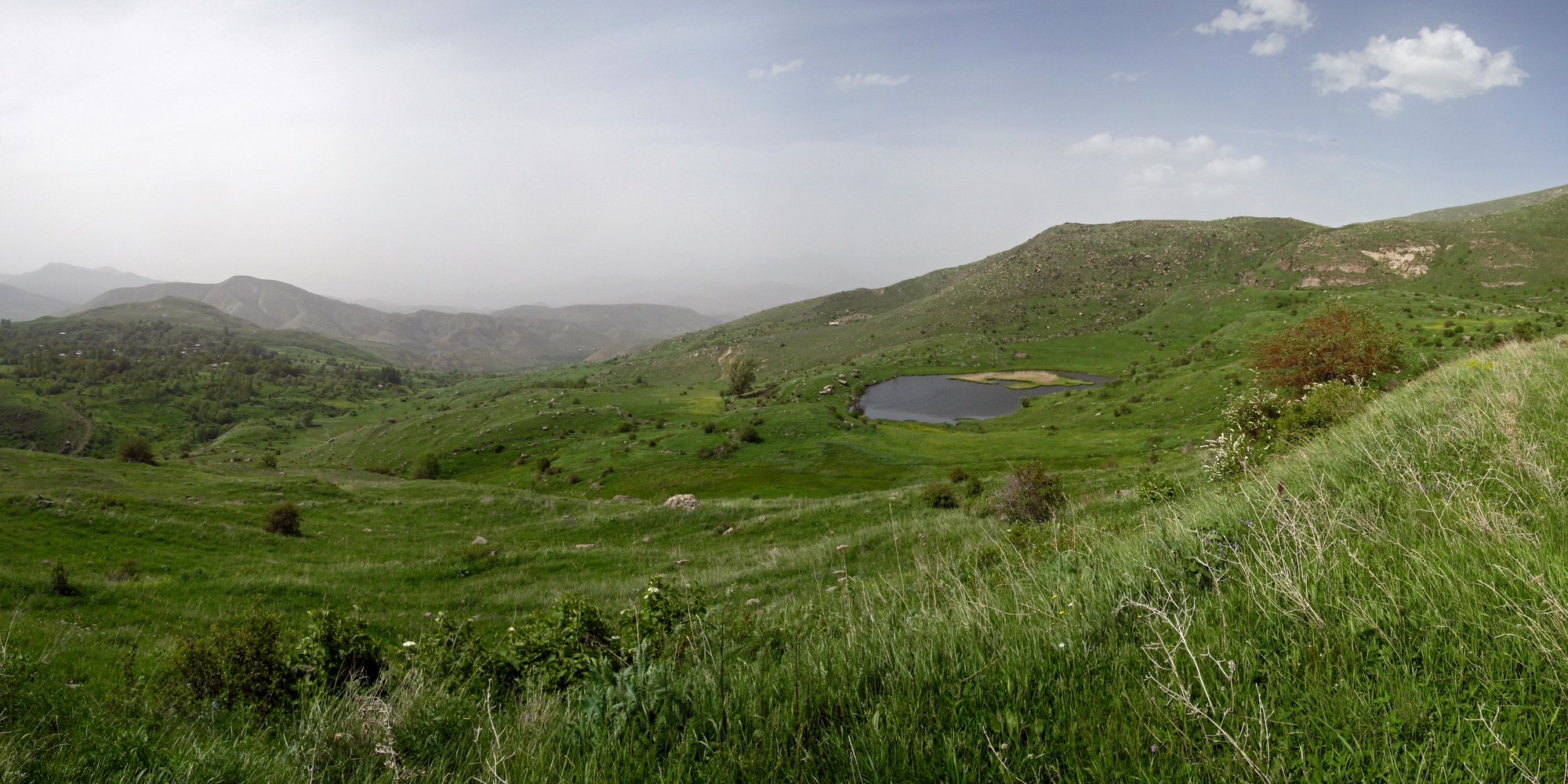
Scenery around Martiros

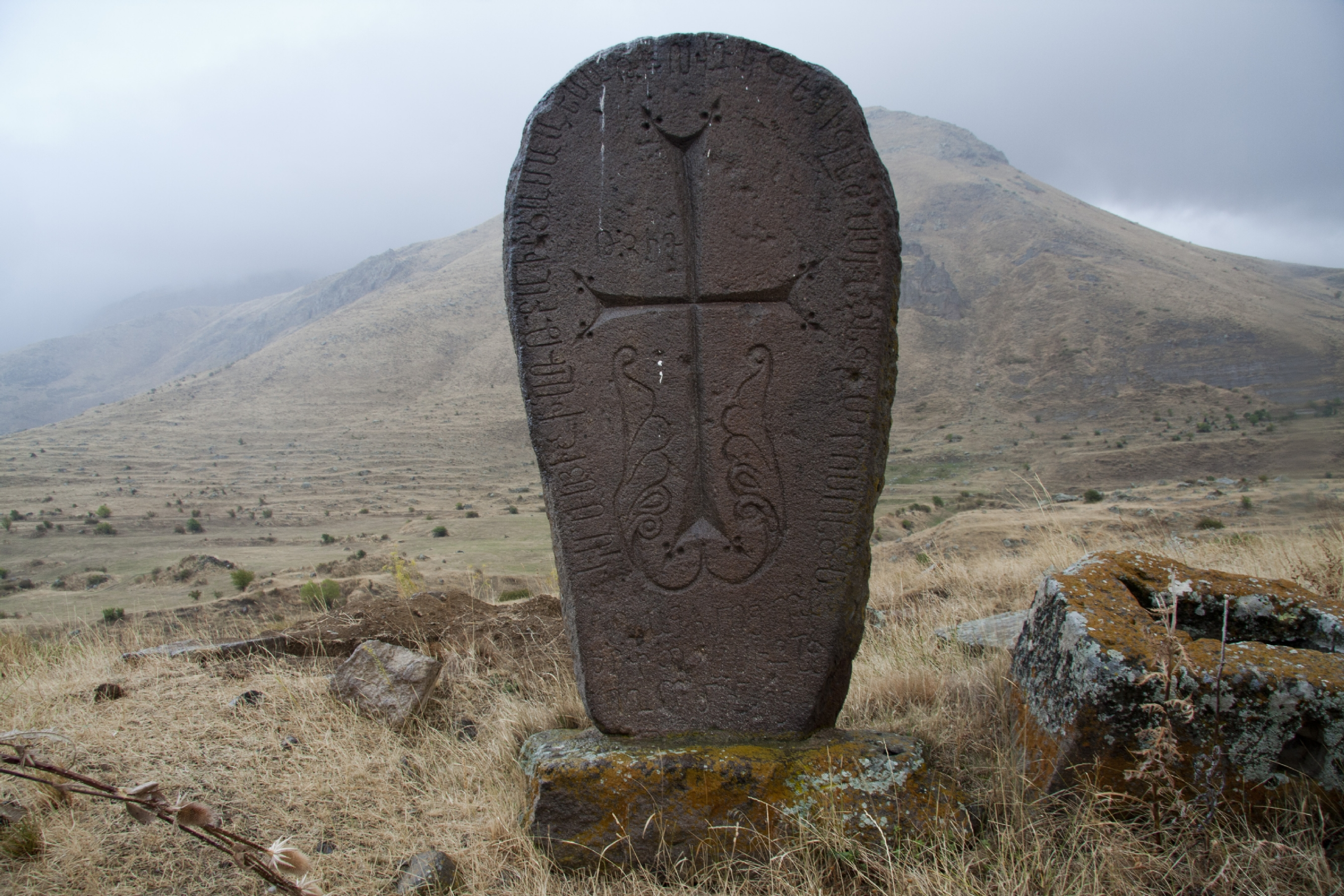
Khachkar in Martiros

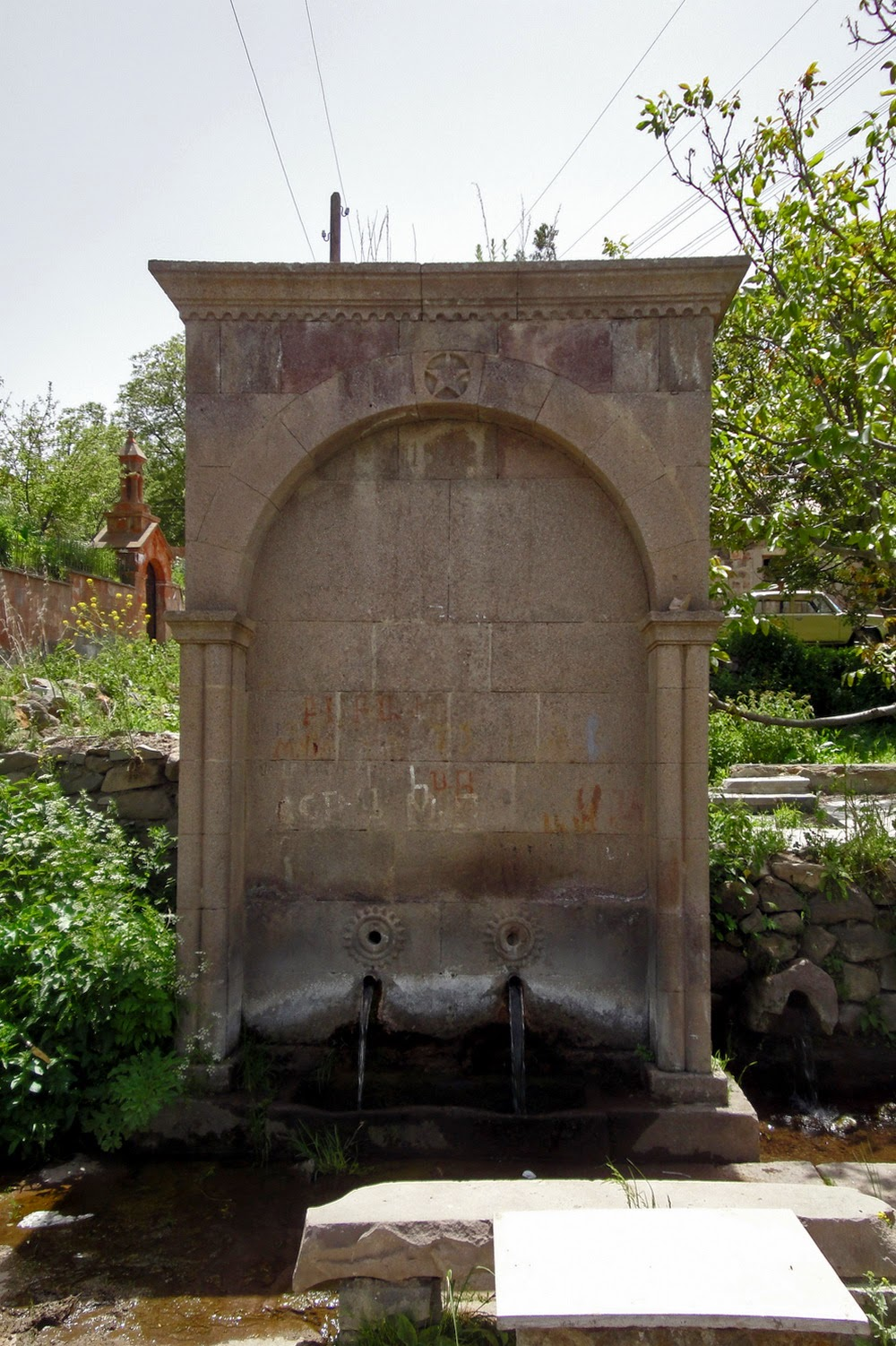
Memorial spring to fallen in WWII

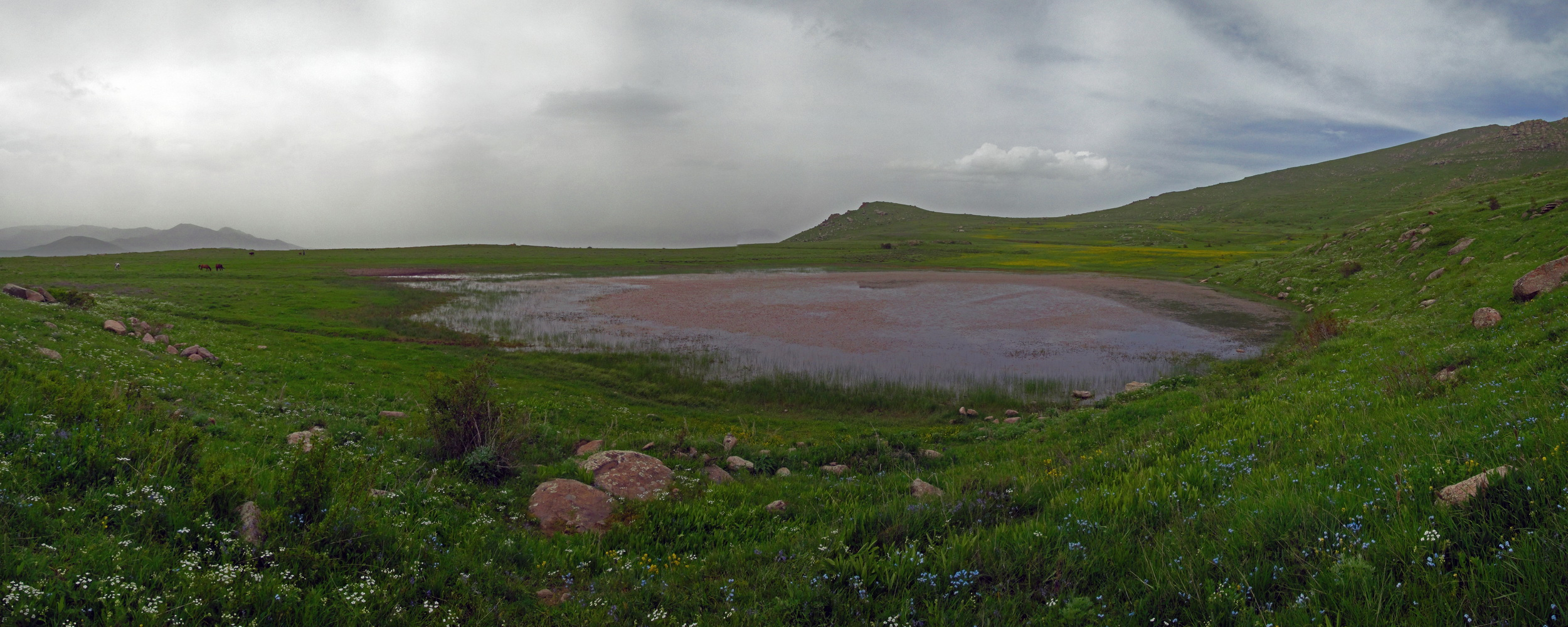
Scenery around Martiros

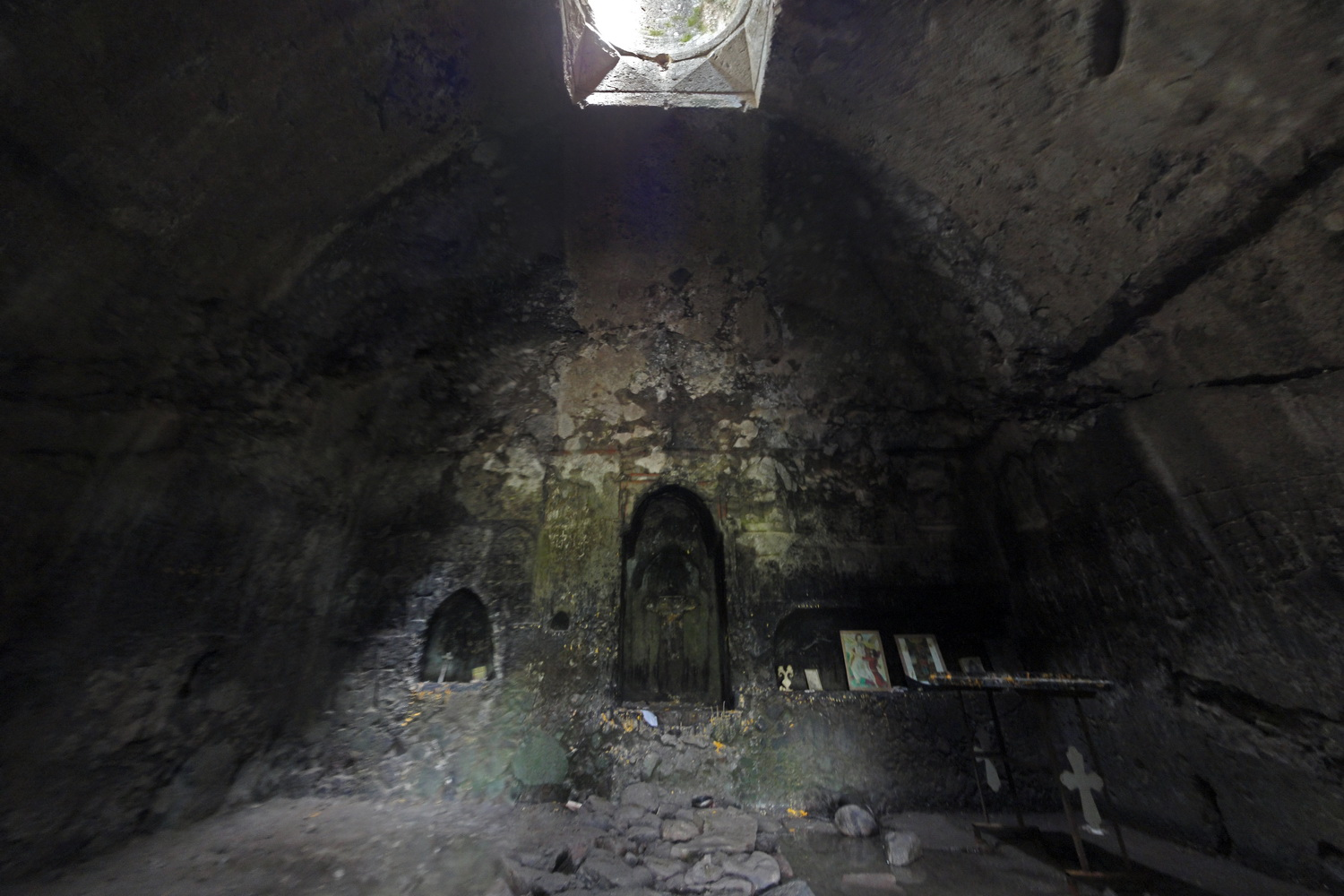
Martirosavank
