= Zaritap =

Zaritap Զառիթափ
- Location within Armenia Location within Vayots Dzor
- Coordinates: 39°38′14″N 45°30′31″E
- Country: Armenia
- Province: Vayots Dzor
- Municipality: Vayk

Population (2011)
  - Total: 1,380
- Time zone: UTC+4 (AMT)

Zaritap (Armenian: Զառիթափ) is a village in the Vayk Municipality of the Vayots Dzor Province of Armenia. For a time the village was renamed in honor of Meshadi Azizbekov, an early Bolshevik and one of the 26 Baku Commissars. In the vicinity are 13th-century khachkars and the traces of an old fort.

== Etymology ==
The village was previously known as Azizbekov, Pashalu and Pashaghu.
