= Por, Armenia =

Por Փոռ
- Location within Armenia Location within Vayots Dzor
- Coordinates: 39°38′38″N 45°28′13″E
- Country: Armenia
- Province: Vayots Dzor
- Municipality: Vayk
- Elevation: 1,510 m (4,950 ft)

Population (2011)
  - Total: 134
- Time zone: UTC+4 (AMT)

Por (Armenian: Փոռ) is a village in the Vayk Municipality of the Vayots Dzor Province of Armenia. It has a 19th-century church and a medieval cemetery.
