= Vayk =

City in Vayots Dzor, Armenia

Vayk Վայք
- Town
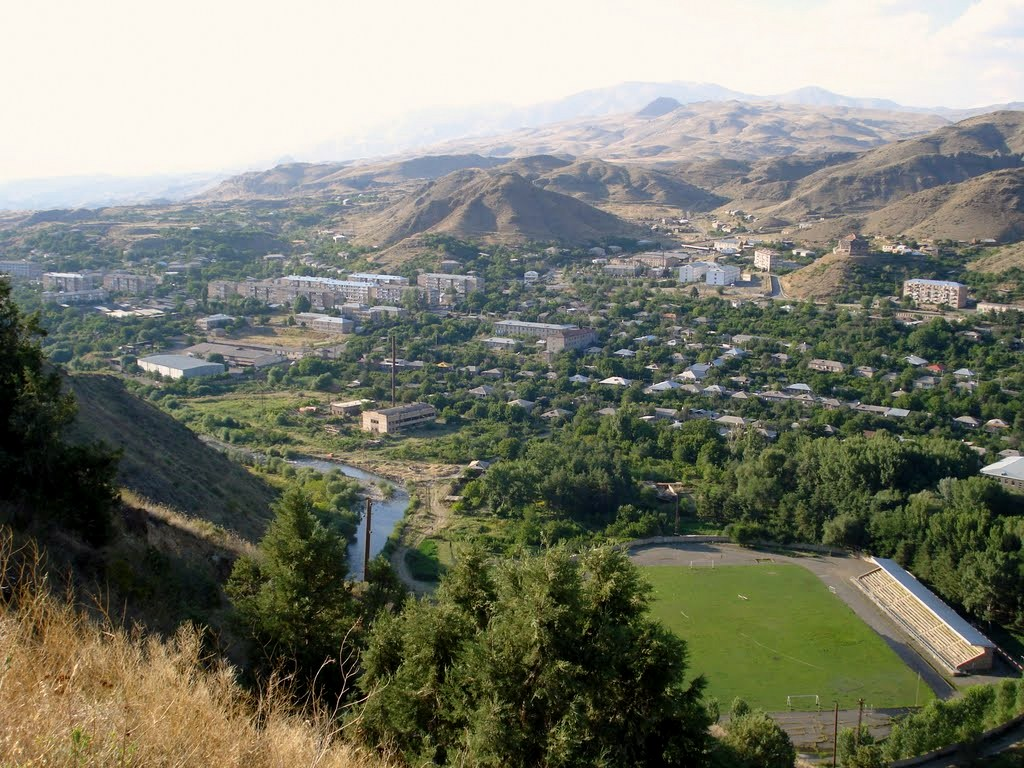
- Vayk

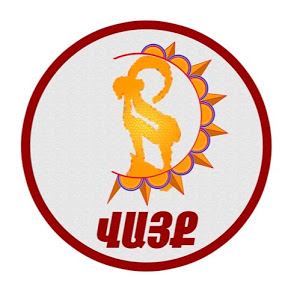
- Coat of arms

- Location within Armenia Location within Vayots Dzor
- Coordinates: 39°41′30″N 45°27′55″E
- Country: Armenia
- Province: Vayots Dzor
- Municipality: Vayk
- Founded: 1828

Area
  - Total: 3 km^{2} (1.2 sq mi)
- Elevation: 1,300 m (4,300 ft)

Population (2022)
  - Total: 5,356
  - Density: 1,800/km^{2} (4,600/sq mi)
- Time zone: UTC+4 (AMT)
- Website: Official website

Vayk (Armenian: Վայք) is a town and the centre of the Vayk Municipality of the Vayots Dzor Province of Armenia.

As per the 2016 official estimate, Vayk had a population of around 4,700. However, as of the 2022 census, the population of the town was 5,356, down from 5,877 in the 2011 census and 6,024 reported in the 2001 census.

== Etymology ==
Literally meaning "sorrows", the name Vayk is derived from the Vayots Dzor canton of the historic Armenian province of Syunik. The great ethnographer Ghevond Alishan connects the origin of the city's name with a terrible earthquake that once happened in Vayots Dzor, which destroyed almost everything, toppling the mountains and covering the rivers.

== History ==
Historically, the area of Vayk belongs to the Vayots Dzor canton of Syunik province; the 9th province of Armenia Major, ruled by the Siunia dynasty.

At the beginning of the 16th century, Eastern Armenia fell under the Safavid Persian rule. The territory of modern-day Vayk became part of the Erivan Beglarbegi and later the Erivan Khanate. The period between the 16th and 17th centuries is considered to be the darkest period in the history of Vayots Dzor. The region was turned into a frequent battlefield between the invading troops of the Turkic and Iranian tribes. As a result, many significant monuments and prosperous villages were destroyed and the population was displaced. In 1747, the region became part of the newly-formed Nakhichevan Khanate.

As a result of the Treaty of Turkmenchay signed between the Russian Empire and Persia in 1828 following the Russo-Persian War of 1826–28, many territories of Eastern Armenia -including Vayots Dzor- became part of the Russian Empire. In 1828-30, many Armenian families from the Iranian towns of Salmas and Khoy were resettled in Eastern Armenia, particularly in the areas that later became part of the Erivan Governorate in 1840. The first wave of Armenian settlers arrived in the Vayots Dzor region in 1828-29, forming the small rural community of Soylan in the area of modern-day Vayk. In 1870, it became part of the newly-founded Sharur-Daralagezsky Uyezd of Erivan Governorate.

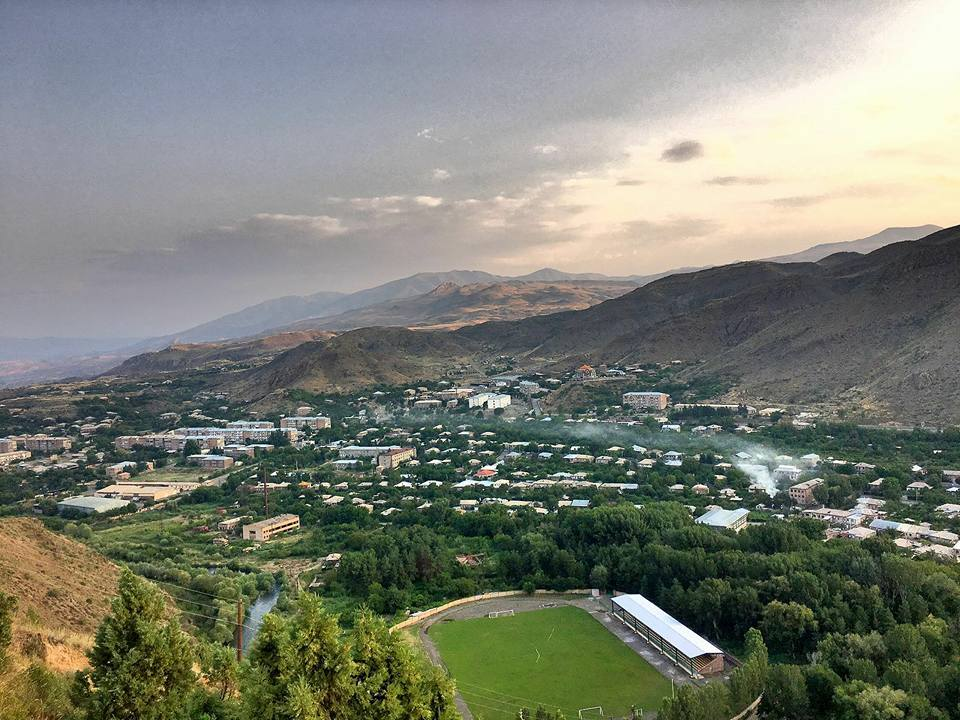
General view of Vayk

After the short-lived independence of Armenia between 1918 and 1920, the region became one of the main centres of the resistance against the Soviet rule, becoming part of the unrecognized Republic of Mountainous Armenia under the leadership of Garegin Nzhdeh.

After falling to the Bolsheviks in July 1921, Soylan became part of the Armenian SSR. In 1931, it became the centre of the newly formed Azizbekov raion. In October 1956, amid the Khrushchev Thaw, Soylan was given the status of an urban-type settlement and renamed Azizbekov in honor of the Bolshevik revolutionary Meshadi Azizbekov. Anastas Mikoyan, Azizbekov's revolutionary comrade in the Baku Commune, visited the town a few years later, in the 1960s. In 1973, a branch of the Jermuk Mineral Water Factory was opened in Azizbekov.

Shortly before the independence of Armenia, Azizbekov was renamed Vayk on 23 November 1990. Later in 1995, Vayk was given the status of a town within the Vayots Dzor Province as per the newly-adopted administrative reforms. The economy of the town has gradually declined in the post-independence period, and the Vayk branch of the Jermuk Water Factory was closed.

== Geography ==
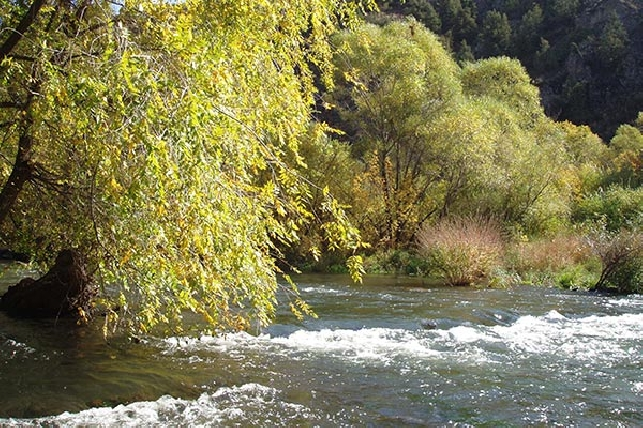
Arpa River

Vayk is located at a road distance of 140km south of the capital Yerevan on way to Goris. The provincial centre Yeghegnadzor is at road distance of 20km southeast of Vayk.

With an elevation of 1300 meters above sea level, Vayk is situated on the left bank of Arpa River surrounded with the Yeghegis mountains from the northwest and Vayk range from the south.

The town is characterized with cold and snowy winters, and mild cool summers.

== Demographics ==
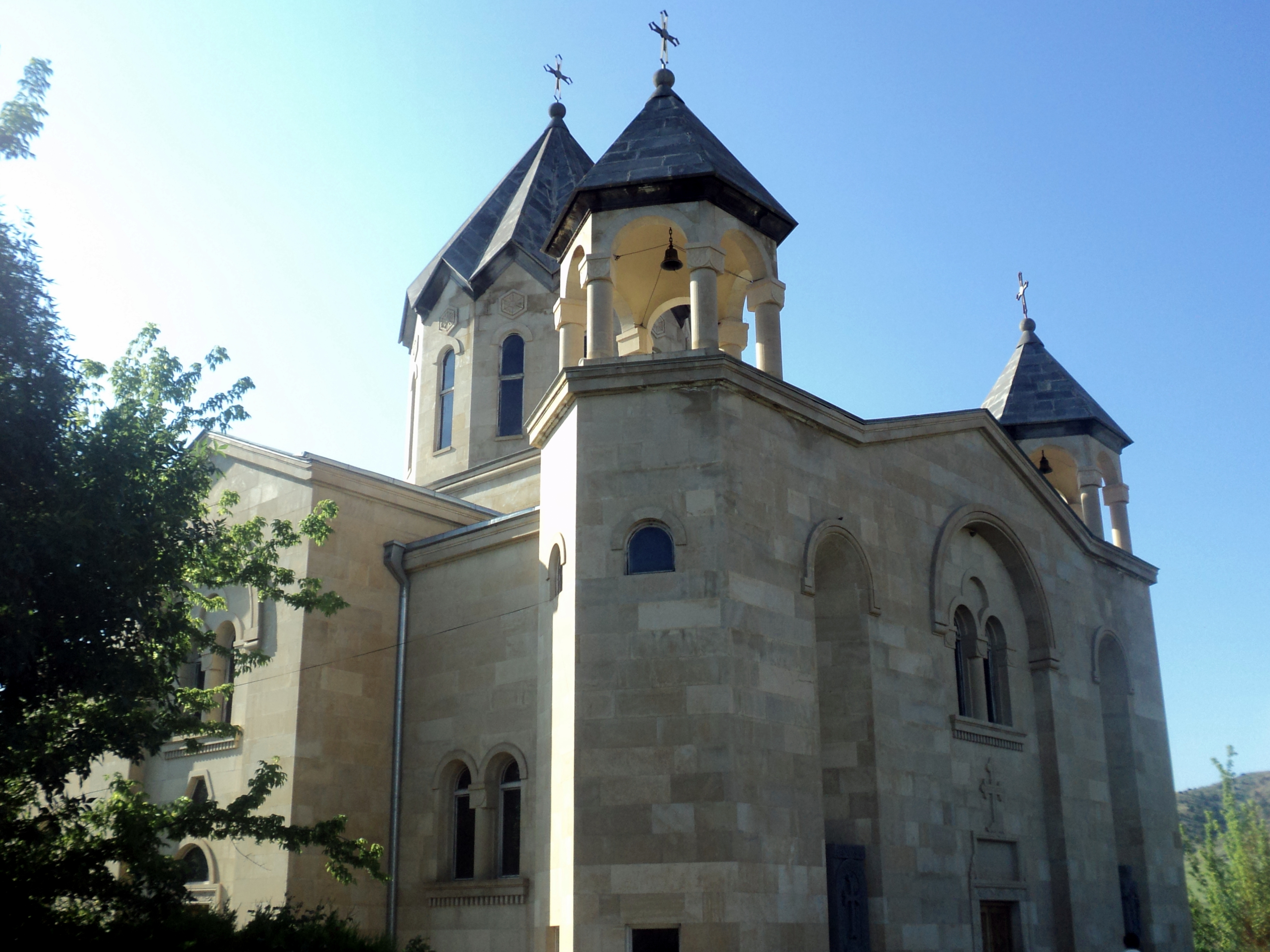
Saint Trdat Church

Historical population
Year	Pop.	±% p.a.
1897	22	—
1963	1,115	+6.13%
1976	4,644	+11.60%
1989	6,550	+2.68%
2001	6,024	−0.70%
2011	5,877	−0.25%
2022	5,356	−0.84%

== Culture ==
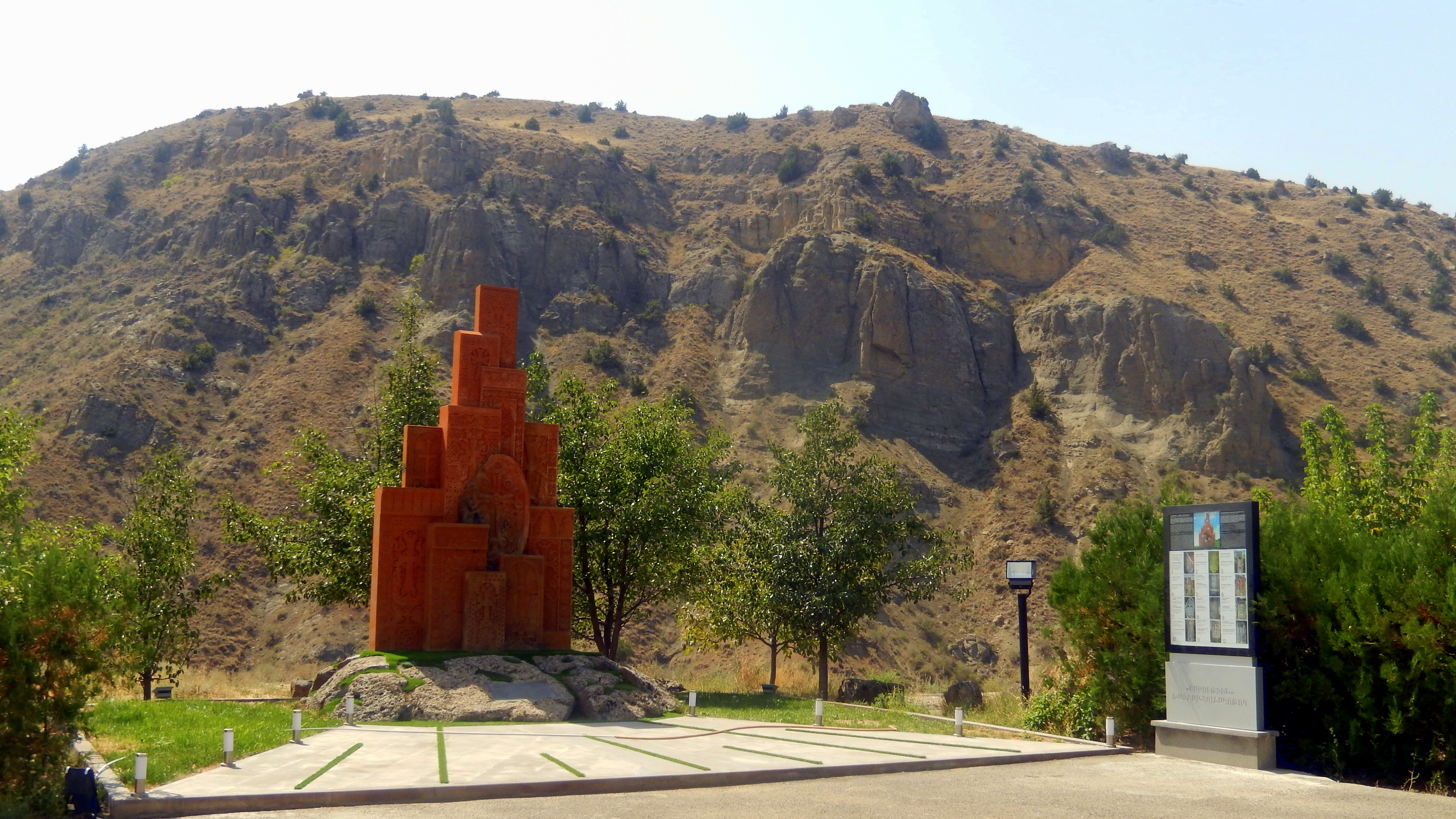
Group of Khachkars in Vayk

The remains of an old settlement of Moz dating back to the 1st millennium BC is found at the northeast of Vayk.

The Vayk bridge of the 17th century spanning the Arpa River is located 1km west of the town. The bridge was renovated by Ivan Paskevich in 1827, during his campaign against Qajar Persia.

The town of Vayk has a cultural centre with 2 theatre halls (600 and 200 seats), a music academy, an art academy, and a public library with more than 180,000 items.

The Karen Demirchyan public park is located at the centre of the town.

A speciality of Vaik is Karshm, a local walnut-based soup with red as well as green beans, chickpeas and spices. It is garnished with red pepper and garlic.

== Transportation ==
The M-2 Motorway that connects Armenia from north to south, passes through the town. The town is connected with the surrounding communities through a regional networks of well-developed roads.

== Economy ==
The economy of Vayk is based on service, agriculture, and manufacturing. Vayk Winery, established in 2000, is a wine producer based in Vayk.Other major firms include the "WCW of Vaik" building materials factory founded in 1968, "Meg Ararat" factory for tea production founded in 2008. Retail, food, and service centers along the M2 highway play a significant role in the town's economy. In 2020, the first industrial photovoltaic power station was launched in Vayk producing up to 5.3MW power.

The town has its own central hospital since 1984.

== Education ==
The town Vayk is home to 3 public education schools as well as to 2 pre-school kindergartens. Vayk used to have an intermediate medical college which is currently not in operation.

== Sport ==
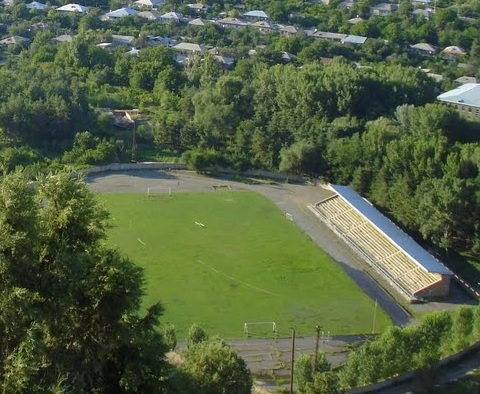
Arevik Stadium

Vayk is home to the municipal Arevik Stadium opened in 1985, with a capacity of 2,000 seats. It was entirely renovated in 2016. However, the town is not represented by any professional football team in the domestic competitions until 2020, when the Noravank SC was founded.

The town has a sports school run by the municipality. The school is currently serving the young athletes of the town and the nearby villages. However, the facilities in the school are outdated needing an entire renovation process for the complex.

== Notable people ==
- Silva Hakobyan, singer

== See also ==
- Syunik (historic province)
- Siunia dynasty
- Sharur-Daralagezsky Uyezd
