= Zedea =

Zedea Զեդեա
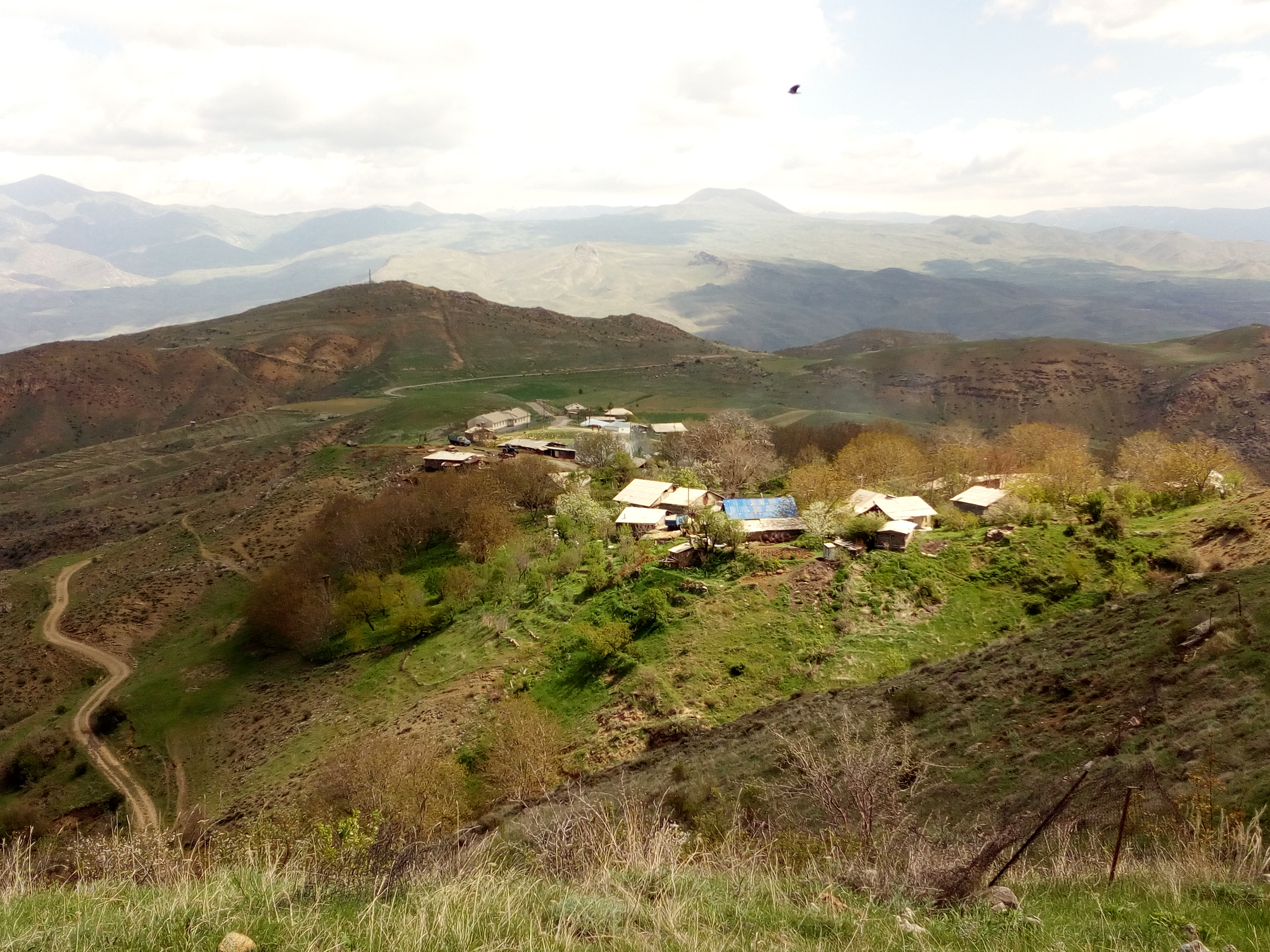

- Location within Armenia Location within Vayots Dzor
- Coordinates: 39°40′55″N 45°23′30″E
- Country: Armenia
- Province: Vayots Dzor
- Municipality: Vayk
- Elevation: 1,650 m (5,410 ft)

Population (2011)
  - Total: 141
- Time zone: UTC+4 (AMT)

Zedea (Armenian: Զեդեա) is a village in the Vayk Municipality of the Vayots Dzor Province of Armenia. There are a few khachkars in the vicinity of the village.

== Etymology ==
The village was previously known as Zeyta and Zeita.

== Gallery ==
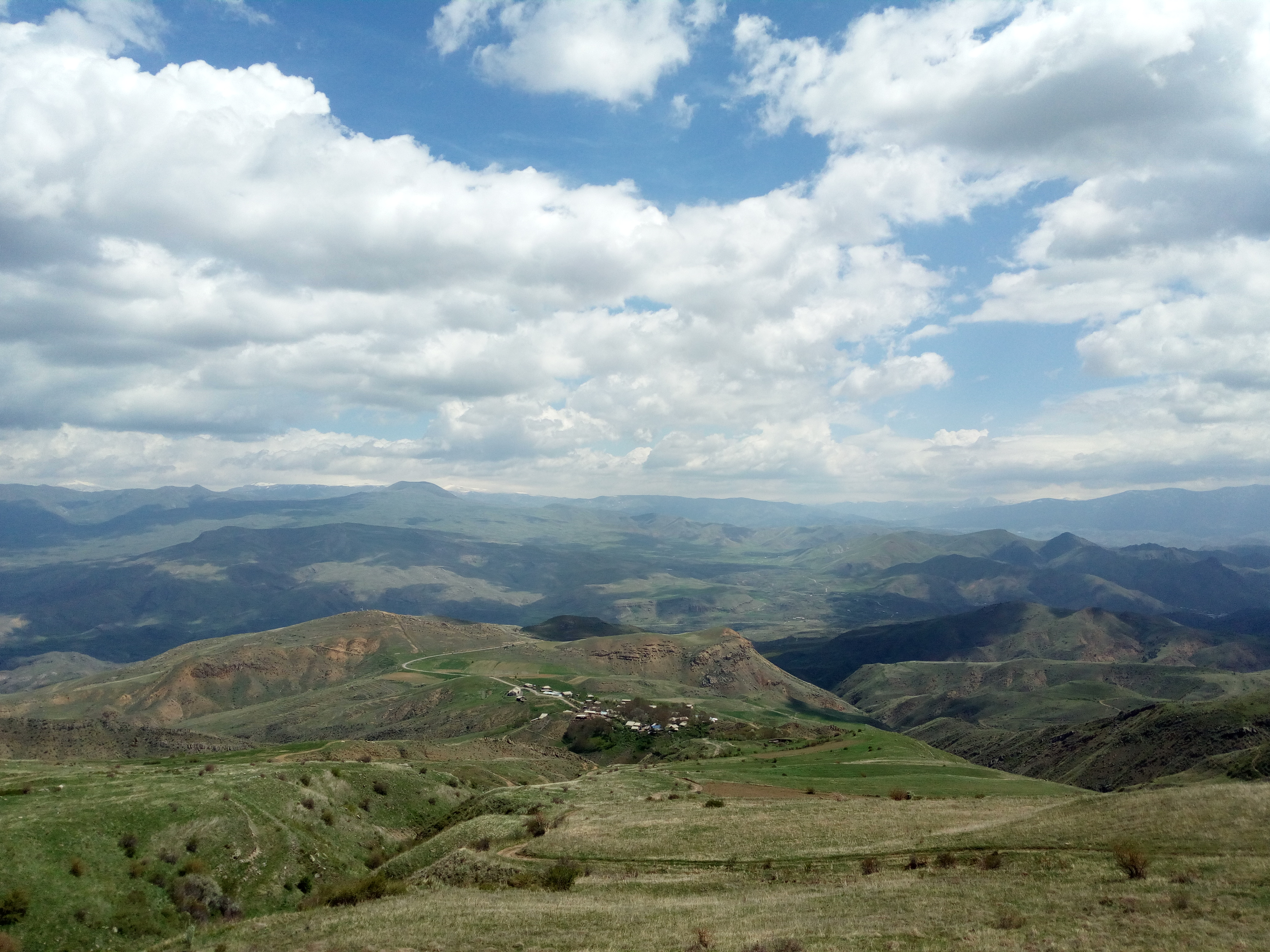
Zedea as seen from Vardablur
