= Nor Aznaberd =

Nor Aznaberd Նոր Ազնաբերդ
- Location within Armenia Location within Vayots Dzor
- Coordinates: 39°32′39″N 45°25′00″E
- Country: Armenia
- Province: Vayots Dzor
- Municipality: Vayk

Population (2011)
  - Total: 126
- Time zone: UTC+4 (AMT)

Nor Aznaberd (Armenian: Նոր Ազնաբերդ) is a village in the Vayk Municipality of the Vayots Dzor Province of Armenia.
