= Horadis =

Horadis Հորադիս
- Location within Armenia Location within Vayots Dzor
- Coordinates: 39°37′18″N 45°22′28.4″E
- Country: Armenia
- Province: Vayots Dzor
- Municipality: Vayk
- Time zone: UTC+4

Horadis (Armenian: Հորադիս), is an abandoned village in the Vayk Municipality of the Vayots Dzor Province of Armenia.

== Demographics ==
The former inhabitants of the village emigrated from Iran in 1828–1829.

The population of Horadis since 1831 is as follows:

Year	Population
1831	167
1897	703
1926	578
1939	801
1959	399
1970	55
