= Vayk Community =

Vayk Վայք
- Urban Community
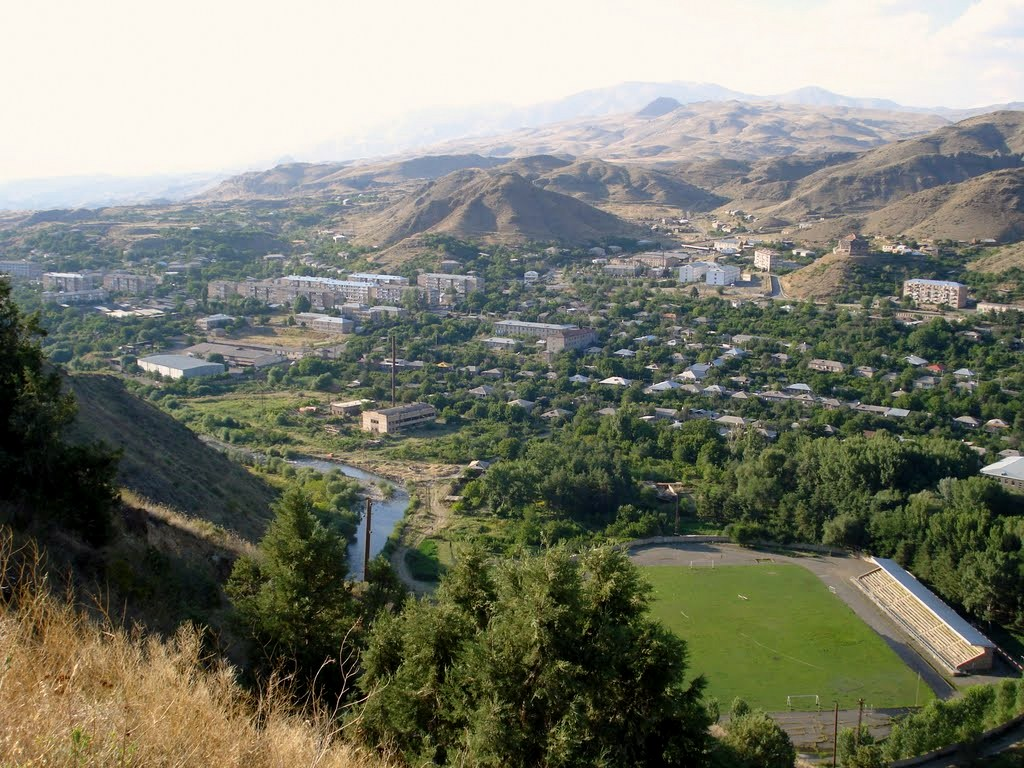
- Interactive map of Vayk
- Coordinates: 39°41′N 45°26′E
- Country: Armenia
- Province: Vayots Dzor
- Formed: 8 October 2016
- Administrative centre: Vayk

Government
  - Mayor: Mkhitar Matevosyan

Area
  - Total: 184 km^{2} (71 sq mi)

Population (2011 census)
  - Total: 7,064
  - Density: 38.4/km^{2} (99.4/sq mi)
- Time zone: AMT (UTC+04)
- Postal code: 3601–3810
- ISO 3166 code: AM-VD
- FIPS 10-4: AM10

Vayk Municipality, referred to as Vayk Community (Armenian: Վայք Համայնք Vayk Hamaynk), is an urban community and administrative subdivision of Vayots Dzor Province of Armenia, at the southeastern end of the country. Consisted of a group of settlements, its administrative centre is the town of Vayk.

== Included settlements ==
Settlement	Type	Population (2011 census)
Vayk	Town, administrative centre	5,877
Arin	Village	309
Azatek	Village	603
Por	Village	134
Zedea	Village	141

== Politics ==
Vayk Municipal Assembly (Armenian: Վայքի համայնքապետարան, Vayki hamaynqapetaran) is the representative body in Vayk Municipality, consisting of 15 members which are elected every five years. The last election was held in December 2021. Mkhitar Matevosyan of Civil Contract was elected mayor.

Party	2021	Current Municipal Assembly
**Civil Contract**	**5**	
Hanrapetutyun Party	**5**	
Homeland Party	**3**	
**Liberal Party**	**2**	
Total	15	

Ruling coalition or party marked in bold.

== See also ==
- Vayots Dzor Province
