= University of Gladzor =

Coordinates: 39.7783°N 45.3478°E

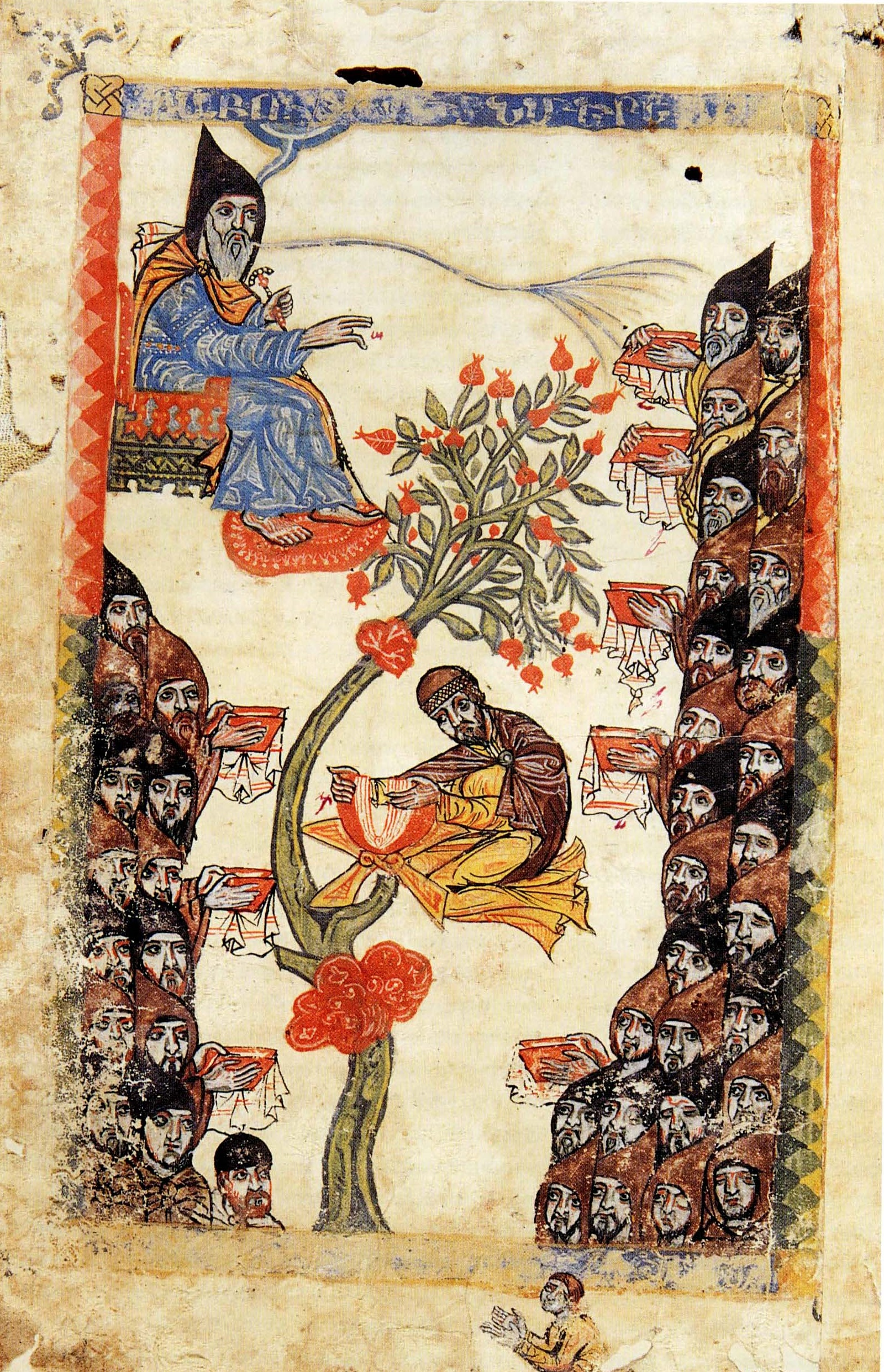
A miniature depicting Esayi of Nich, abbot of Gladzor, while teaching

University of Gladzor (Armenian: Գլաձորի համալսարան, romanized: Gladzori hamalsaran) was a medieval Armenian university, one of the two "great centres of learning" along with the University of Tatev (c. 1340–1425) that were "essentially of a single tradition." It was established around 1280 by Nerses of Mush, a student of Vardan Areveltsi, and operated until 1340 and "left behind a rich intellectual heritage".

The university grew out of the monastic center of learning of the Aghberts or Gladzor Monastery in the region of Vayots Dzor. It flourished under the patronage of the Orbelian and Proshian noble families. Gladzor had at least nine professors and around fifteen lecturers. The university's longtime head was Esayi of Nich (Nchetsi), who led the university until 1331. He was succeeded by the head teacher Tiratur. The noted miniature painters Toros Taronatsi, Avag and Momik taught and painted at Gladzor.

Gladzor had its own bylaws and granted academic degrees. Its three main courses were as follows: 1. Armenian and foreign texts, 2. the art of manuscript writing, and 3. Armenian musical notation (khaz) and music. Among the subjects taught at the university were theology, mythology, philosophy, bibliology, grammar, rhetoric, logic, arithmetic, astronomy, chronology, and geometry. Around 350 students graduated from Gladzor University. The length of matriculation was seven to eight years, not counting the three years of religious education required to be admitted to the university. Graduates received the rank of vardapet. Although it was referred to as a university and sometimes analogized to contemporary European universities, scholar S. Peter Cowe suggests that Gladzor and other medieval Armenian academies were more comparable to monastic schools.

== Gallery ==
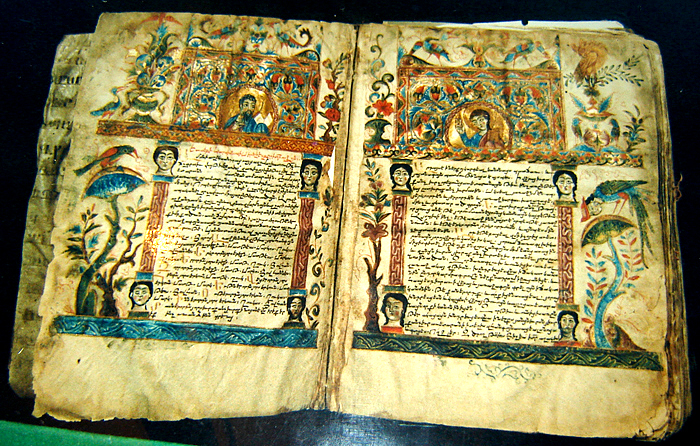
Armenian manuscript of Gladzor University

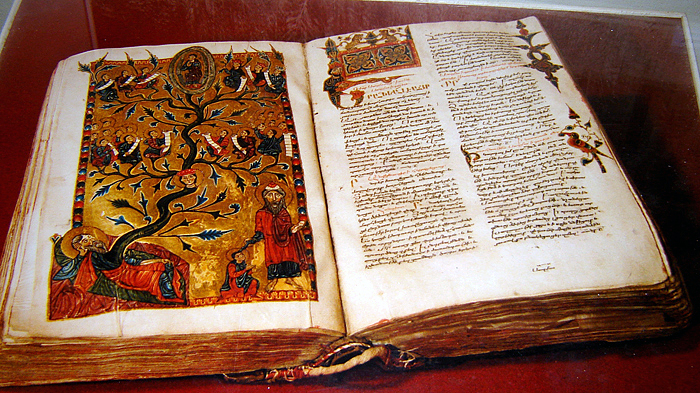
Armenian manuscript of Gladzor University

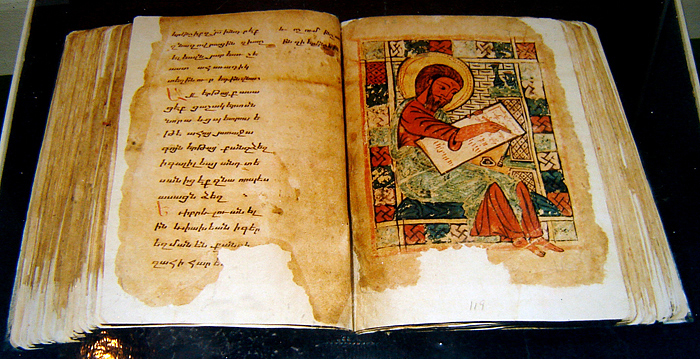
Armenian manuscript of Gladzor University

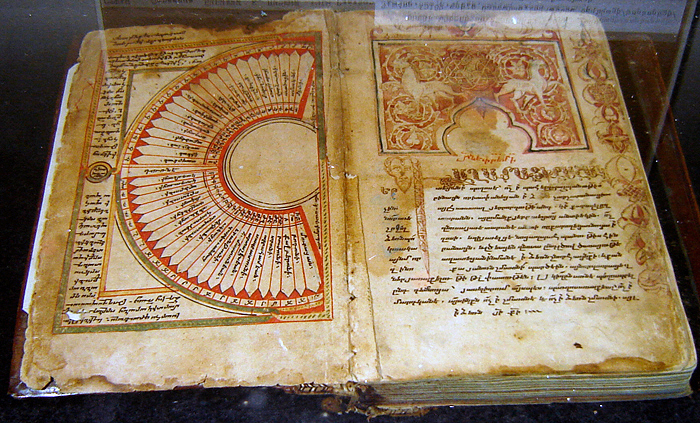
Armenian manuscript of Gladzor University

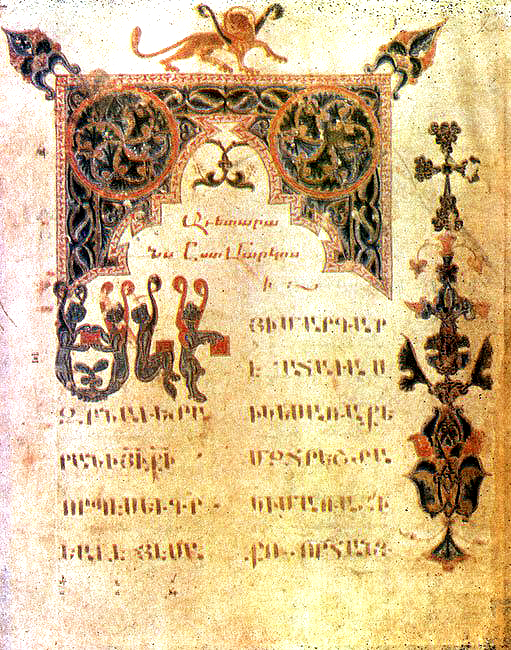
Armenian manuscript of Gladzor University
