= Noravank =

Monastery in Armenia

- Նորավանք
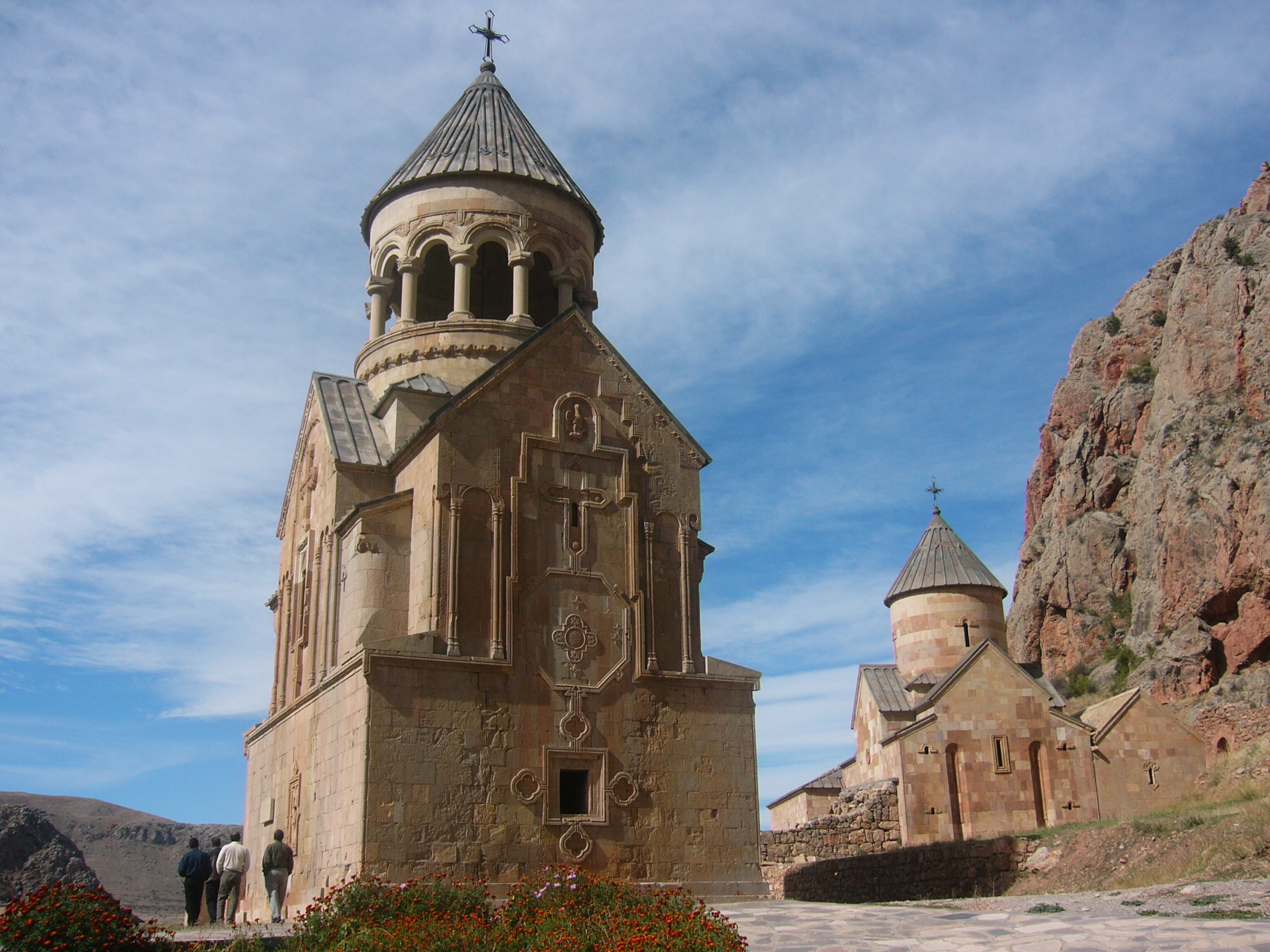
- Surb Astvatsatsin and Surb Karapet Churches with Surb Grigor's Chapel to the right, Noravank

- Location within Armenia Location within Vayots Dzor

Religion
- Affiliation: Armenian Apostolic Church

Location
- Location: Amaghu Valley, Vayots Dzor Province, Armenia
- Coordinates: 39.684061°N 45.232872°E

Architecture
- Style: Armenian
- Groundbreaking: 1105

Noravank (Armenian: Նորավանք, lit. 'new monastery') is a 13th-century Armenian monastery, located 122 km from Yerevan in a narrow gorge made by the Amaghu River, near the town of Yeghegnadzor in Armenia. The gorge is known for its tall, sheer, brick-red cliffs, directly across from the monastery. The monastery is best known for its two-storey Surb Astvatsatsin (Holy Mother of God) Church, which grants access to the second floor by way of a narrow stone-made staircase jutting out from the face of building.

The monastery is sometimes called Noravank at Amaghu, with Amaghu being the name of a small and nowadays abandoned village above the canyon, in order to distinguish it from Bgheno-Noravank, near Goris. In the 13th–14th centuries the monastery became a residence of Syunik's bishops and, consequently, a major religious and, later, cultural center of Armenia closely connected with many of the local seats of learning, especially with Gladzor's famed university and library.

== History ==
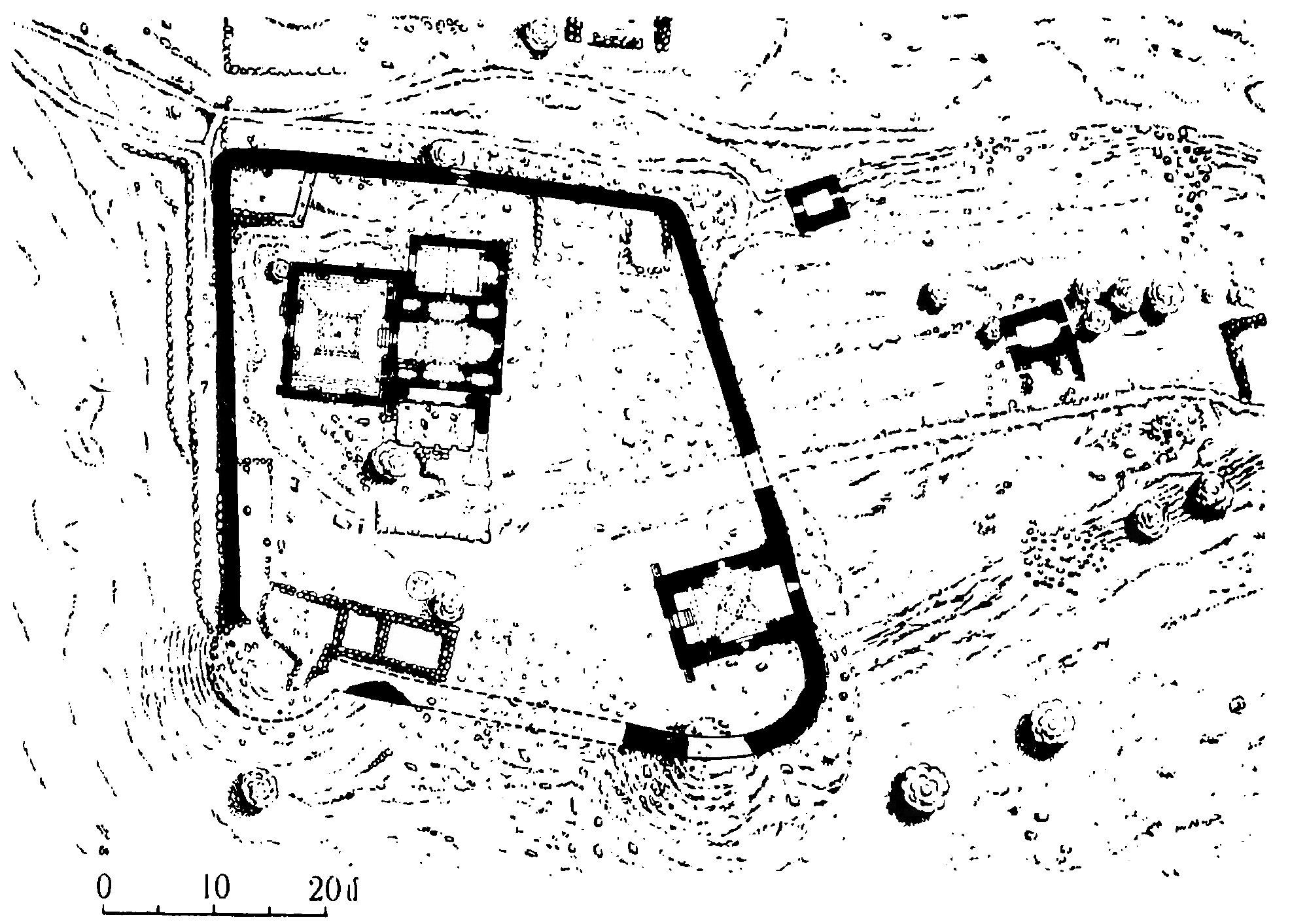
Plan of Noravank

Noravank was founded in 1105 by Bishop Hovhannes, a former abbot of Vahanavank near the present-day city of Kapan in Syunik. The monastic complex includes the church of S. Karapet, S. Grigor chapel with a vaulted hall, and the church of S. Astvatsatsin (Holy Mother of God). Ruins of various civil buildings and khachkars are found both inside and outside of the compound walls. Noravank was the residence of the Orbelian princes. The architect Siranes and the miniature painter and sculptor Momik worked here in the latter part of the thirteenth and early fourteenth century.

== Noravank Complex ==
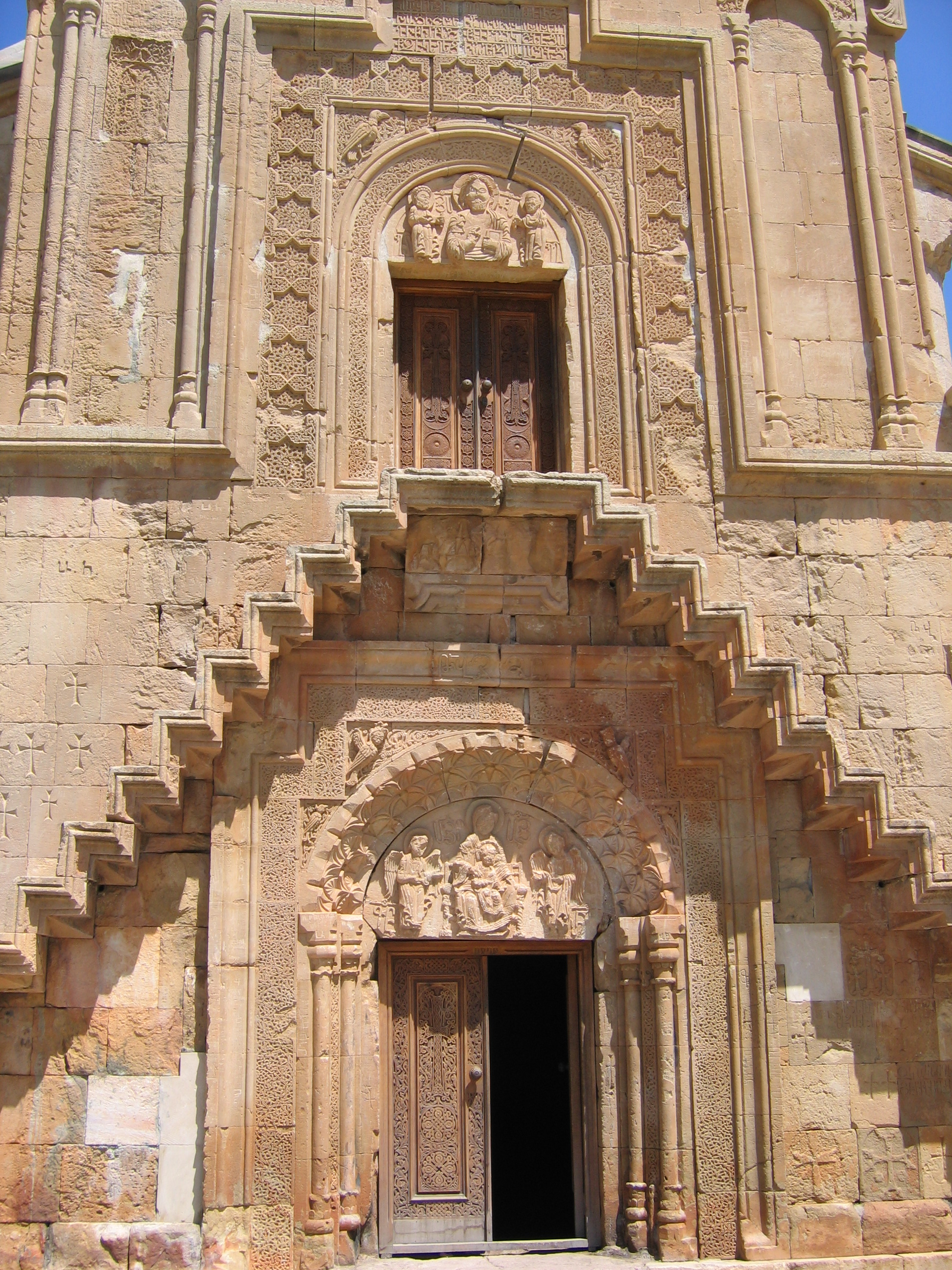
Façade of Surb Astvatsatsin Church

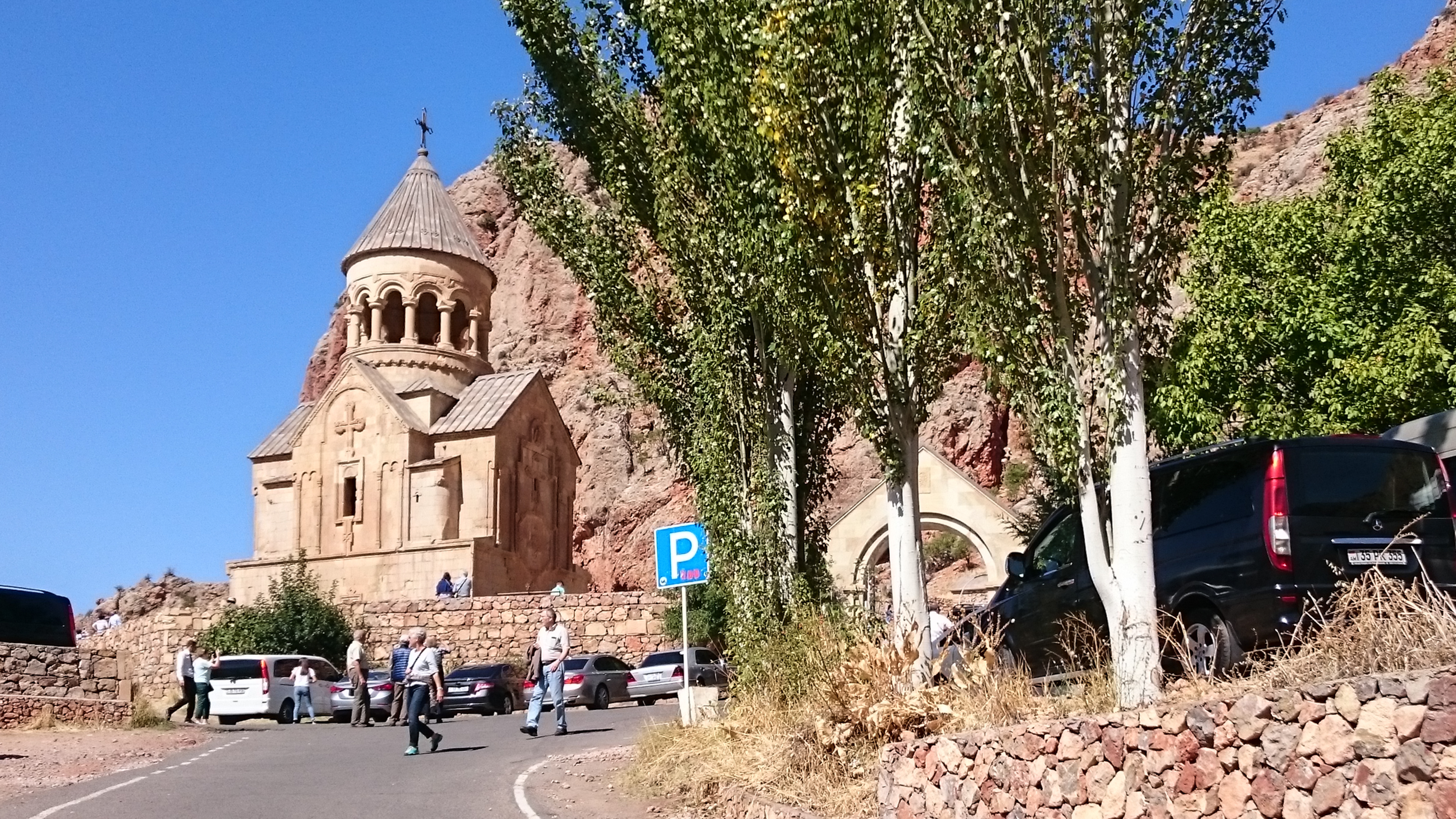
Approach to the monastery

The front of the Astvatsatsin church

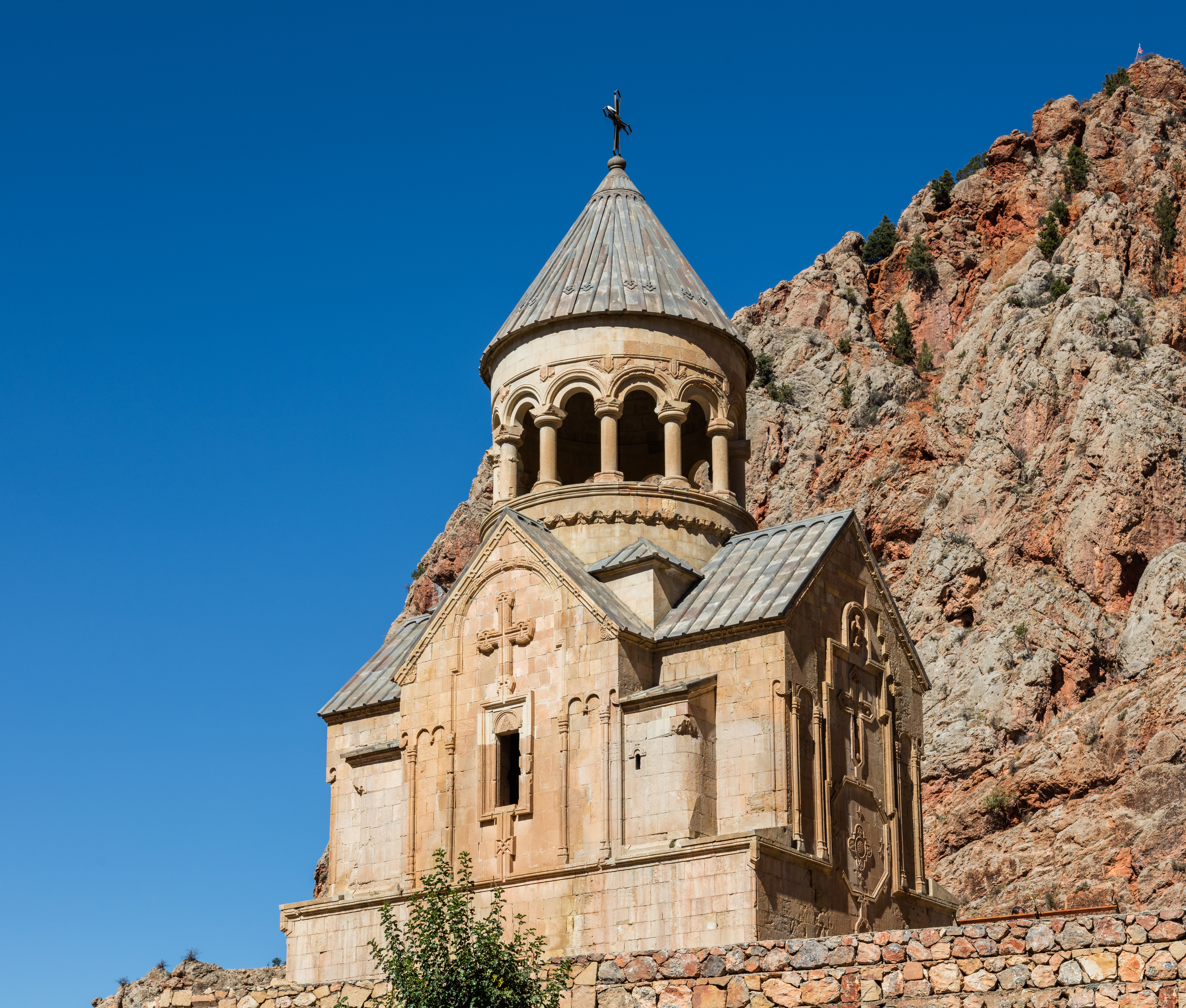
Surb Astvatsatsin Church of Noravank

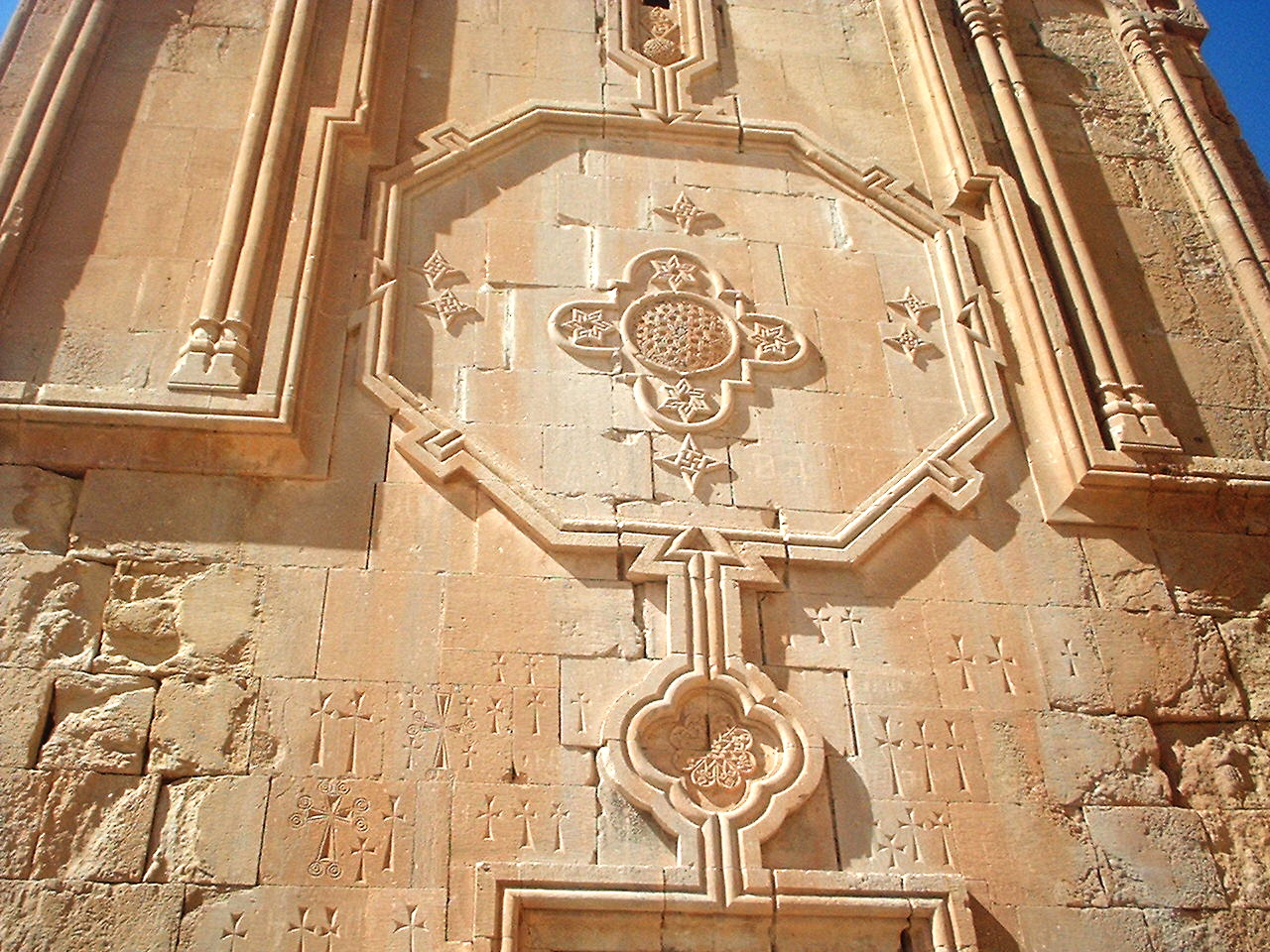
A detail of the Astvatsatsin church

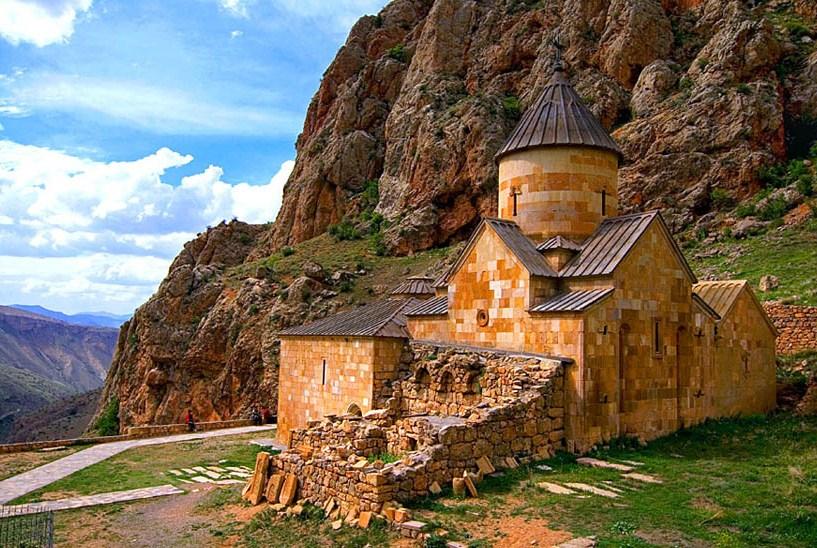
Surb Karapet (St. John the Baptist) Church

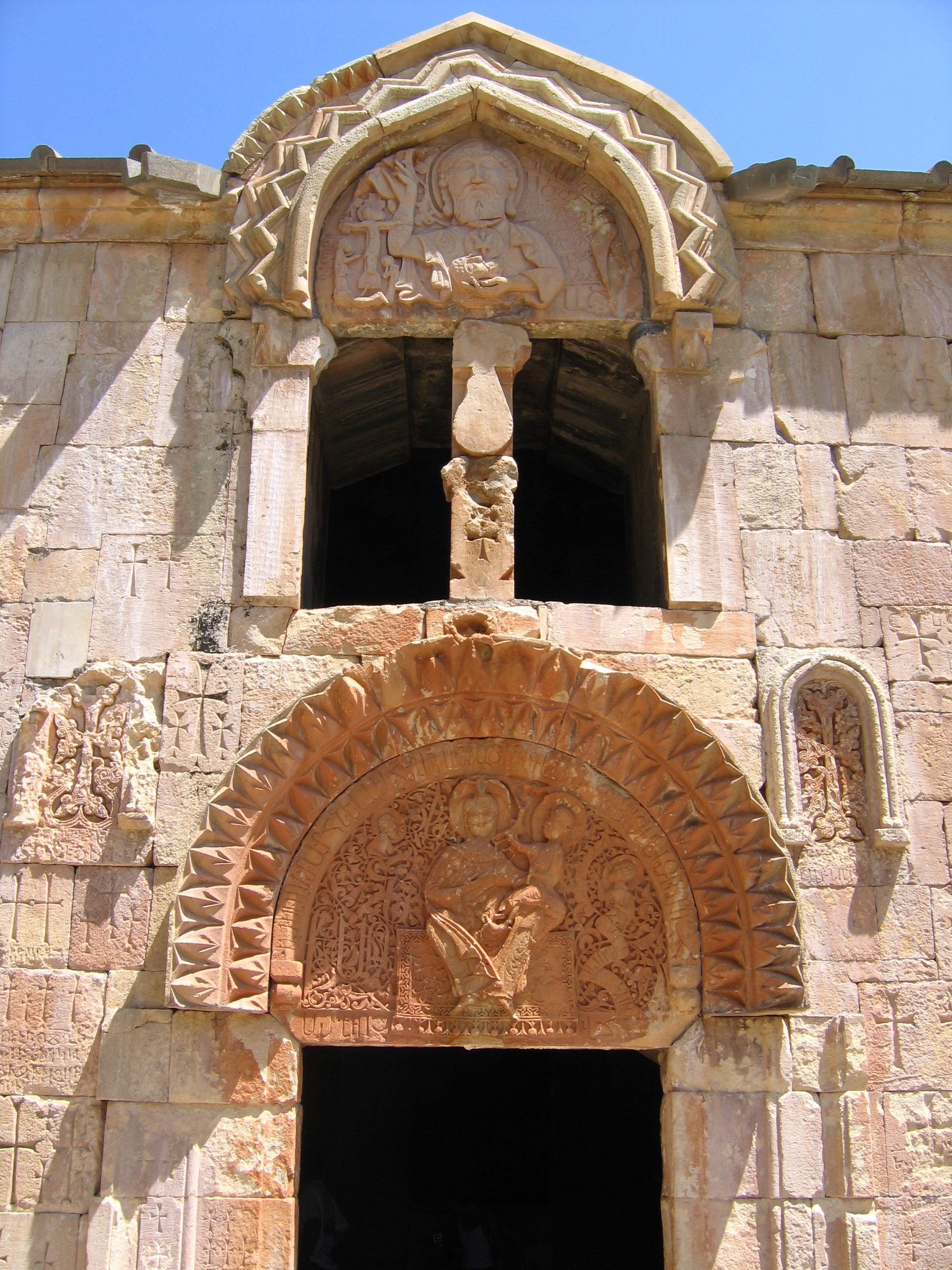
The façade of Surb Karapet Church with a depiction of God the Father (upper relief)

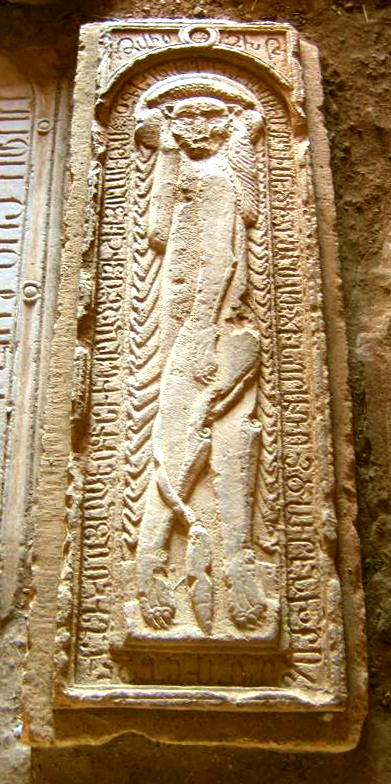
Grave of Elikum III Orbelian, son of Prince Tarsaich Orbelian

The fortress walls surrounding the complex were built in the 17th–18th centuries.

=== Surb Astvatsatsin Church ===
The grandest structure is Surb Astvatsatsin (Holy Mother of God), also called Burtelashen (Burtel's construction) in the honour of Prince Burtel Orbelian, its financier. It is situated to the south-east of the Surb Karapet church. Surb Astvatsatsin was completed in 1339, a masterpiece of the talented sculptor and miniaturist Momik, who designed it, and was also his last work. Near the church there is his tomb khachkar, small and modestly decorated, dated the same year. In recent times the fallen roof had been covered with a plain hipped roof. In 1997 the drum and its conical roof was rebuilt, with the form based on existing fragments. However, it has been criticized as being a "fantasy reconstruction". The ground floor contained elaborate tombs of Burtel and his family. Narrow steps projecting from the west façade lead to the entrance into the church/oratory. There is fine relief sculpture over the entrance, depicting Christ flanked by Peter and Paul.

Burtelashen is a highly artistic monument reminiscent of the tower-like burial structures of the first years of Christianity in Armenia. It is a memorial church. Its ground floor, rectangular in plan, was a family burial vault; the floor above, cross-shaped in plan, was a memorial temple crowned with a multi-columned rotunda.

Burtelashen is the dominant structure in Noravank. The original three-tier composition of the building is based on the increasing height of the tiers and the combination of the heavy bottom with the divided middle and the semi-open top. Accordingly, decoration is more modest at the bottom and richer at the top. Employed as decorative elements are columns, small arches, profiled braces forming crosses of various shapes, medallions, interlaced banding around windows and doors.

The western portal is decorated with special splendour. An important role in its decoration is played by the cantilevered stairs that lead to the upper level, with profiled butts to the steps. The doorways are framed with broad rectangular plaitbands, with ledges in the upper part, with columns, fillets and strips of various, mostly geometrical, fine and intricate patterns. Between the outer plathand and the arched framing of the openings there are representations of doves and sirens with women's crowned heads. Such reliefs were widely used in fourteenth-century Armenian art and in earlier times in architecture, miniatures and works of applied art, on various vessels and bowls. The entrance tympanums are decorated with bas-reliefs showing, on the lower tympanium, the Holy Virgin with the Child and Archangels Gabriel and Michael at her sides, and, on the upper tympanum, a half-length representation of Christ and figures of the Apostles Peter and Paul. As distinct from the reliefs of Noravank's vestry, these ones are carved on a plain surface, which gives them greater independence. The figures are distinguished by their plasticity of form, softness of modeling, and accentuation of certain details of clothing.

A group of the founders of Burtelashen is depicted on three columns of the western part of its rotunda. The picture consisted of relief figures of the Holy Virgin with the Child, sitting on a throne, and two standing men in rich attire, one of them holding a model of the temple.

=== Surb Karapet Church ===
The second church is the Surb Karapet, a cross within square design with restored drum and dome built in 1216–1227, just north of the ruins of the original Surb Karapet, destroyed in an earthquake. The church was built by the decree of Prince Liparit Orbelian.

In 1340 an earthquake destroyed the dome of the church which in 1361 was reconstructed by the architect Siranes. In 1931 the dome was damaged during another earthquake. In 1949, the roof and the walls of the church were repaired. In 1998 the roof and drum was rebuilt with the aid of an Armenian-Canadian family.

Forming the western antechamber is an impressive gavit of 1261, decorated with splendid khachkars and with a series of inscribed gravestones in the floor. Note the famous carvings over the outside lintel. The church houses Prince Smbat Orbelian's mausoleum. The gavit was probably a four-pillar one. In 1321 the building, probably destroyed by an earthquake, was covered with a new roof in the shape of an enormous stone tent with horizontal divisions, imitating the wooden roof of the hazarashen—type peasant home. This made the structure quite different from other Armenian monuments of the same kind. The ceiling has four rows of brackets forming stalactite vaulting (cf. muqarnas) with a square lighting aperture at the top. A broad protruding girth over the half-columns, the deep niches with khachkars and the low tent-like ceiling almost devoid of decoration give the dimly lit interior a gloomy look.

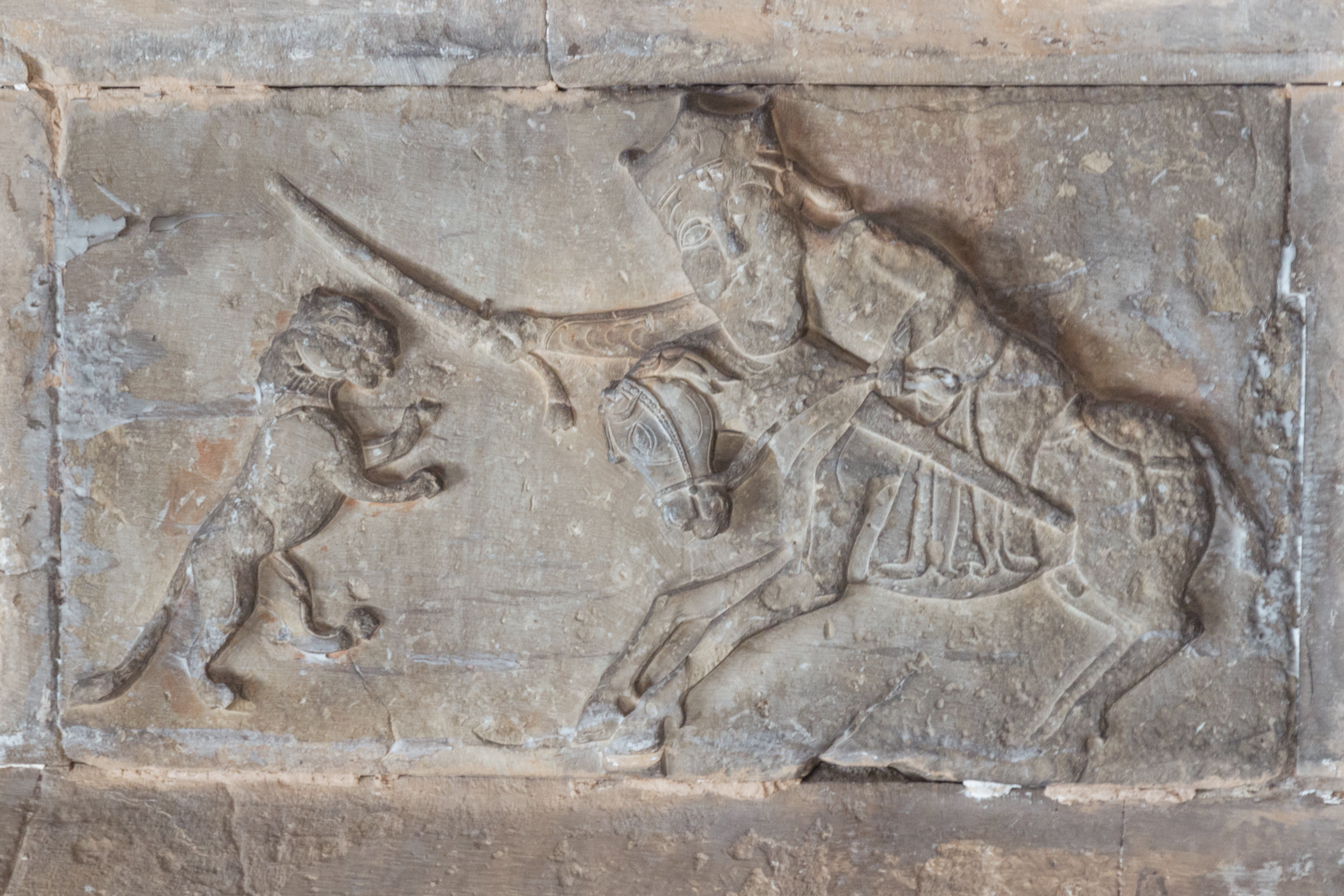
Noravank horseman hunting a lion. Relief in the gavit.

The exterior decoration focus' mainly on the western facade where the entrance to the building is. Framed in two rows of trefoils and an inscription, the semi-circular tympanum of the door is filled with an ornament and with a representation of the Holy Virgin seated on a rug with the Child and flanked by two saints. The ornament also has large letters interlaced by shoots with leaves and flowers. The Holy Virgin is sitting in the Oriental way with Child. The pattern of the rug is visible with drooping tassels. In Syunik temples of the thirteenth-fourteenth centuries the cult of the Holy Virgin was widely spread. She was depicted in relief, and many churches were dedicated to her.

The pointed tympanum of the twin window above the doorway features a relief depicting God the Father, rendered with an enlarged head, a beard, and almond-shaped eyes. The figure is depicted blessing the Crucifix with the right hand while holding the head of John the Baptist in the left hand, positioned beneath a dove representing the Holy Spirit. A seraph occupies the right corner of the tympanum, with an inscription filling the space between it and the central figure.

=== Surb Grigor Chapel ===
The side chapel of Surb (Saint) Grigor was added by the architect Siranes to the northern wall of Surb Karapet church in 1275. The chapel contains more Orbelian family tombs, including a splendid carved lion/human tombstone dated 1300, covering the grave of Elikum son of Prince Tarsayich Orbelian. The modest structure has a rectangular plan, with a semi-circular altar and a vaulted ceiling on a wall arch. The entrance with an arched tympanum is decorated with columns, and the altar apse is flanked with khachkars and representations of doves in relief.

=== Khachkars ===
The complex has several surviving khachkars. The most intricate of them all is a 1308 khachkar by Momik. Standing out against the carved background are a large cross over a shield-shaped rosette and salient eight-pointed stars vertically arranged on its sides. The top of the khachkar shows a Deesis scene framed in cinquefoil arches symbolizing a pergola as suggested by the background ornament of flowers, fruit and vine leaves.

=== Nature ===
The area is a part of the Gnisheek Prime Butterfly Area and the Noravank Important Bird Area. A wide variety of animals and plants can be found here, such as the Bezoar Goat, Bearded Vulture, Alexanor butterfly, and others.

Chronological History

Before the 9th century - According to historian Stepanos Orbelian a church dedicated to St. Pokas stands on the monastery site.

800-900 - A church was built: sources call it St. Karapet's or Church of Svag Khoradzor. The name will later be transformed into Noravank (nor = new, vank = monastery), in 1221.

989 - Hovhannes the Scribe copies a Gospel for the priest Stepanos. It is so called Gospel of Etchmiadzin that contains some miniated pages of an earlier date which are some of the oldest and most famous examples of Armenian miniature art.

1105 - According to historian Stepanos Orbelian Bishop Hovhannes, abbot of the monastery of Vahanavank, moves to Noravank and helps to found the first nucleus of monks at the monastery. His brother, Prince Hamtum, then comes to the monastery and helps to develop it. The monastery is to become rich: it will own the two fortresses of Anapat and Hraseka, along with twelve farms.

1154 - Bishop Hovhannes dies and is buried in the monastery. According to the historian Stepanos Orbelian, this bishop had founded a church and connected buildings; there is not trace of this complex left today.

1168 - Bishop Grigoris of Syunik dies and is buried in the monastery.

1170 - Bishop Stepanos, son of Bishop Grigoris, settles in Noravank, choosing it as the seat of the bishopric. Hs is to obtain the Valley of Agarak and fortress of Anapat as donation to the monastery from Mongol Sultan Yelkduz, along with exception from taxes on church property.

1201 - This date is found on a khachkar at the southern entrance of the Church of St. Karapet.

1216 - Bishop Stepanos dies and is buried in the monastery. Father Sargis, his successor, shares the monastery's property with Tatev.

1216-1221 - Prince Liparit Orbelian and Bishop Sargis build a church in the monastery: sources refer to it as the Church of St. Stepanos Noravank (the protomartyr).

1221 - Bishop Sargis, grandson of Archbishop Stepanos, builds the Church of St. Karapet as the burial chapel for the family. According to the historian Stepanos Orbelian, the church was built by the will of Liparit Orbelian, founder of the dynasty, and building work lasted seven years, ending in 1228. A khachkar in the west wall of the gavit is dedicated Nazar and Nazlu.

1222 - A memorial to Vasak, who died of a premature death, is inscribed on a khachkar on the south wall of the gavit.

1223 - A Church of St. Stepanos is consecrated and Prince Bupak donates the village of Aghberis to the monastery to commemorate the occasion.

1223-1261 - A gavit is built in the monastery.

13th century - Khatun, daughter of Khalkhashah, donates 300 pieces of silver and an orchard to the monastery.

1232 - A certain Gorg makes various donations to the monastery.

1240 - This date in on a khachkar inside the gavit.

1256 - A certain Shatluys donates an orchard to the monastery.

1260 - Bishop Ter-Stepan of Syunik dies and is buried in the monasteries gavit.

1261 - Prince Smbat Orbelian restores the monasteries gavit, perhaps with the aid of Bishop Sargis and architect Siranes. There are two inscriptions on the gavit walls bearing the dates 1232 and 1256: this indicates that there was previously another building on the site, and its stones were used for the gavit. In this same year, Prince Smbat donates various goods to the monastery for the salvation of the soul of his brother, Prince Burtel. Near the khachkar in the gavit there is another, erected in memory of Burtel, son of Elikum, grandson of Liparit. Another khachkar recalls Burtel, son of "prince of princes" Smbat.

1270-1290 - This is the date on a khachkar inside the refectory-hospice that has now partially collapsed.

1271 - A Noravank inscription mentions the name "hovatun" as being a building of unknown purpose.

Before 1273 - An inscription reveals that the "prince of princes" Smbat has donated lands and orchards to the monastery.

1273 - King Smbat dies: he was the elder brother of Prince Tarsaich and is buried in the monastery.

1273-1290 - Bishop Sargis builds a hospice close to the monastery and donates various goods to it: the proceeds are used to provide pilgrims with food and drink.

1275 - Prince Tarsaich builds a burial chapel for his brother Smbat and building, the work of architect Siranes, will subsequently house all family tombs.

1277 - A khachkar is erected on the tomb of Prince Mahevan, son of Senekerim, King of Syunik.

1285 - Kukor erects khachkar on the tombs of his brother Palka and his mother Aspi.

1287 - Stepanos Orbelian becomes metropolitan of Syunik. He is one of the most prestigious men of culture and politics in medieval Armenia. He is to leave numerous works of poetry and essays on history. He finally succeeds in uniting the monasteries of Tatev and Noravank.

2nd half of 13th century - A bridge is built to connect the monastery with the region.

1290 - An inscription mentioning the death of the "prince of princes" Tarsaich can be seen at the east entrance of the chapel.

1291 - Amira, grandson of Djurdj, buys an orchard for 4000 pieces of silver and donates it to the monastery.

1292 - The architect-scribe Momik transcribes a beautiful Gospel for the brothers Hovhannes and Tadeos Princess Mina Khatun, daughter of King Djala of the Aghuank and wife of Tarsaich, donates many goods to the monastery.

1298 - Ter Sargis, bishop of Syunik, dies and is buried in the monastery. Stepanos, bishop of Syunik and son of "prince of princes" Tarsaich, makes an important donation to the monastery. Princess Mina Khatun is buried in the monastery.

1299 - In the monastery of Noravank, metropolitan and historian Stepanos Orbelian finishes his great work entitled History of the Province of Syunik (Patmut'yun Nahangin Sisakan).

1300 - Prince Elikum Orbelian dies and is buried in the monastery, in the Chapel of St Grigor; the tomb of the prince, son of Tarsaich, bears a human representation with a lion's tail and paws: these characteristics were attributed to him for his courage in war. Stepanos Orbelian finishes his poem "Lament on Behalf of the Cathedral" ("Voghb i dimats surb Katoghikeyin").

1302 - The architect-scribe Momik writes and miniates a Gospel for Stepanos Orbelian.

1303 - Metropolitan Stepanos Orbelian dies and is buried in the monastery. Sandjar, son of Tankarghul, donates an orchard to the monastery on the birth of his son.

1303-1324 - The abbot of monastery is Hovhannes-Orbel, nephew of Prince Liparit. By his will, the architect Momik is to build the Church of St. Astvatsatsin at Areni. Also by his will, numerous codices are written in manuscript.

1304 - Momik erects a khachkar to the memory of metropolitan Stepanos Orbelian.

1305 - An inscription on his tomb mentions the death of Bishop Grigor of Syunik.

1307 - Momik and Poghos "vardapet" write and miniate a Gospel.

1308 - Tamta Khatun, mother of Prince Burtel, erects a beautiful khachkar made by the architect Momik.

1312 - Tamta Khatun, mother of Prince Burtel, is buried in the chapel of King Smbat. Grigor, nephew of Prince Dop, donates various orchards to the monastery.

1318 - Bughta, brother of Burtel, is buried in the chapel of King Smbat and a khachkar is erected in his memory.

1320-1322 - The priest Sargis, nephew of Archbishop Stepanos of Syunik, builds the church of Noravank.

1321 - St. Karapet's building is probably damaged by an earthquake.

1324 - Hovhannes-Orbel, metropolitan of Syunik, dies and is buried in the monastery.

1324-1331 - Stepanos Tarsaich Orbelian becomes abbot of the monastery. A student of chief vardapet Esayi Nshetsi of University of Gladzor, he is to build the Zorats church in the region of Yeghegis.

1331-1339 - Prince Burtel, as is mentioned in the inscription on the west entrance, builds the Church of St. Astvatsatsin, the so-called "Burtelashen", in the monastery.

1333 - The architect-sculpture-painter Momik dies and is buried in the monastery. The scribe Kiuron re-copies a manuscript by order of Grigoris.

1345 - Gontse, daughter of Paron Khosrovik, donates Khangah orchard to the monastery for salvation of the soul of Amad.

15th century - The architectural model of the two-story funerary chapel spreads throughout Syunik and all monasteries build chapel of the same type.

1476 - The scribe Poghos re-copies a Gospel.

1486 - Davit Darbin erects a khachkar in the monastery to the memory of Tukhik.

1569 - Bishop Eghishe erects a khachkar to the memory of his uncle Bishop Arakel.

1628 - Tuma Abegha writes Gospel in the monastery.

1600-1700 - Fortified walls, a hospice and various other buildings are constructed in the monastery.

1755 - A battle is fought between Hadji Pasha, who has taken over the monastery, and the armies of Isa Ashag.

1813 - The Persian King, Shah Fath-Ali, hands the monastery to Petros Bek Orbelian and orders the proceeds from the village of Amaghu be given to the monastery for its running and maintenance.

1840 - An earthquake damages the monastery.

1948-1949 - The Committee for the Conservation of Monuments in Soviet Armenia begins restoration works on the monastery. A. Balasanyan draws up the projects.

1982-1983 - Renewed consolidation, restoration and excavation works at the monastery begin.

1995 - Because of its over restoration, Noravank is denied entry to UNESCO's World Heritage List.

1997 - The drum and conical dome of the Surb Astvatsatsin church is rebuilt.

== Gallery ==
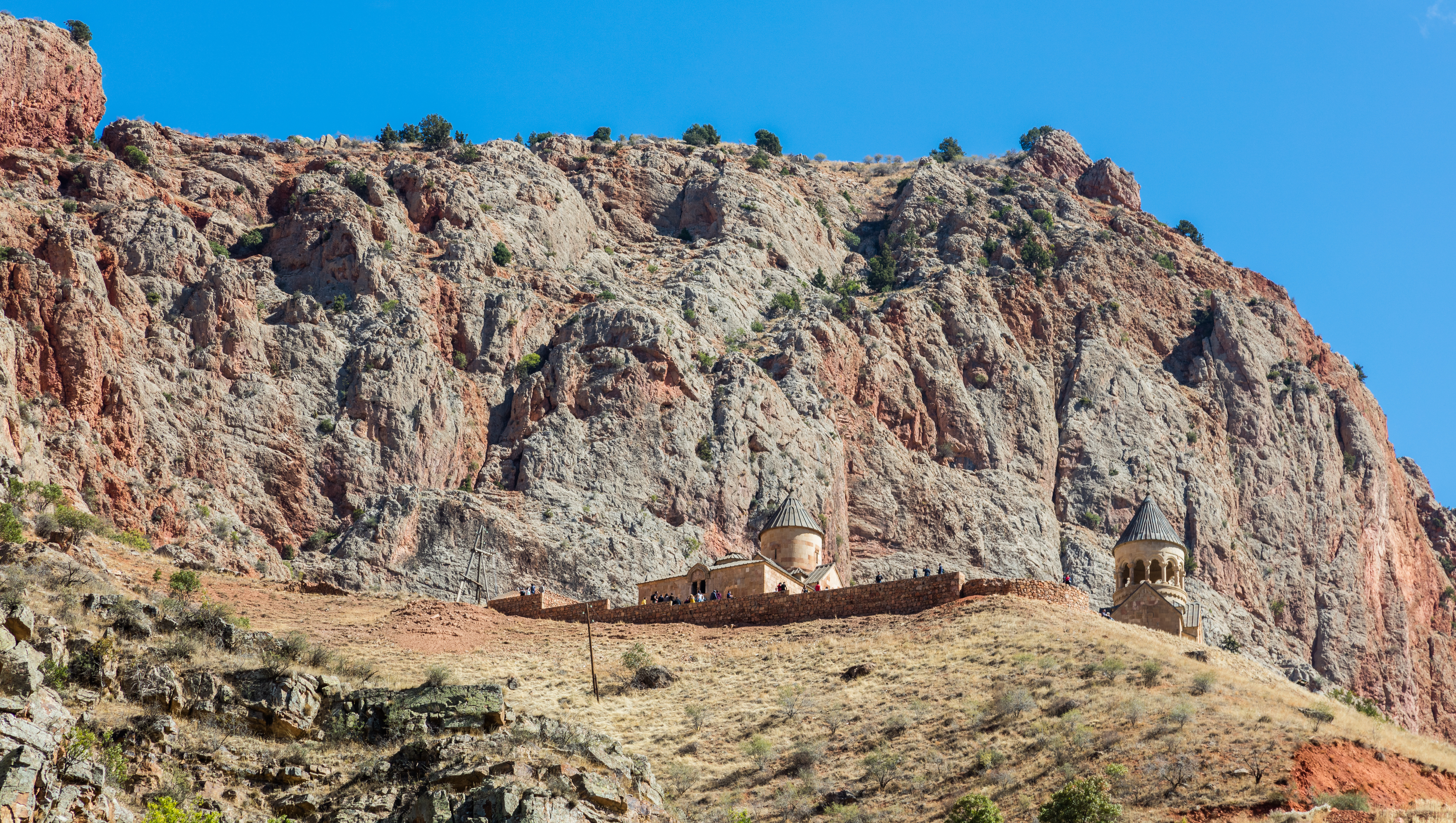
Noravank

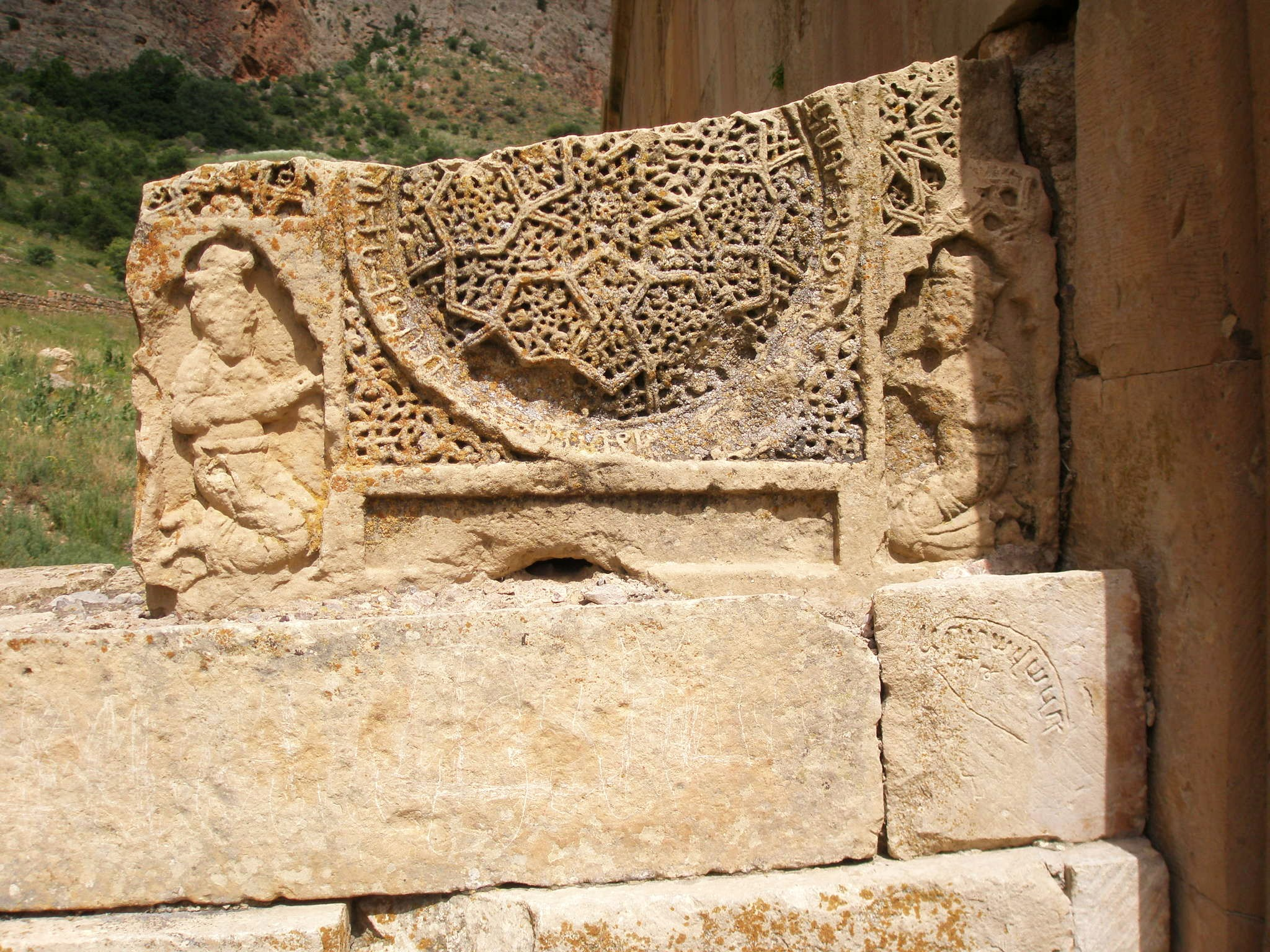
Broken khachkar to the left of Astvatsatsin church

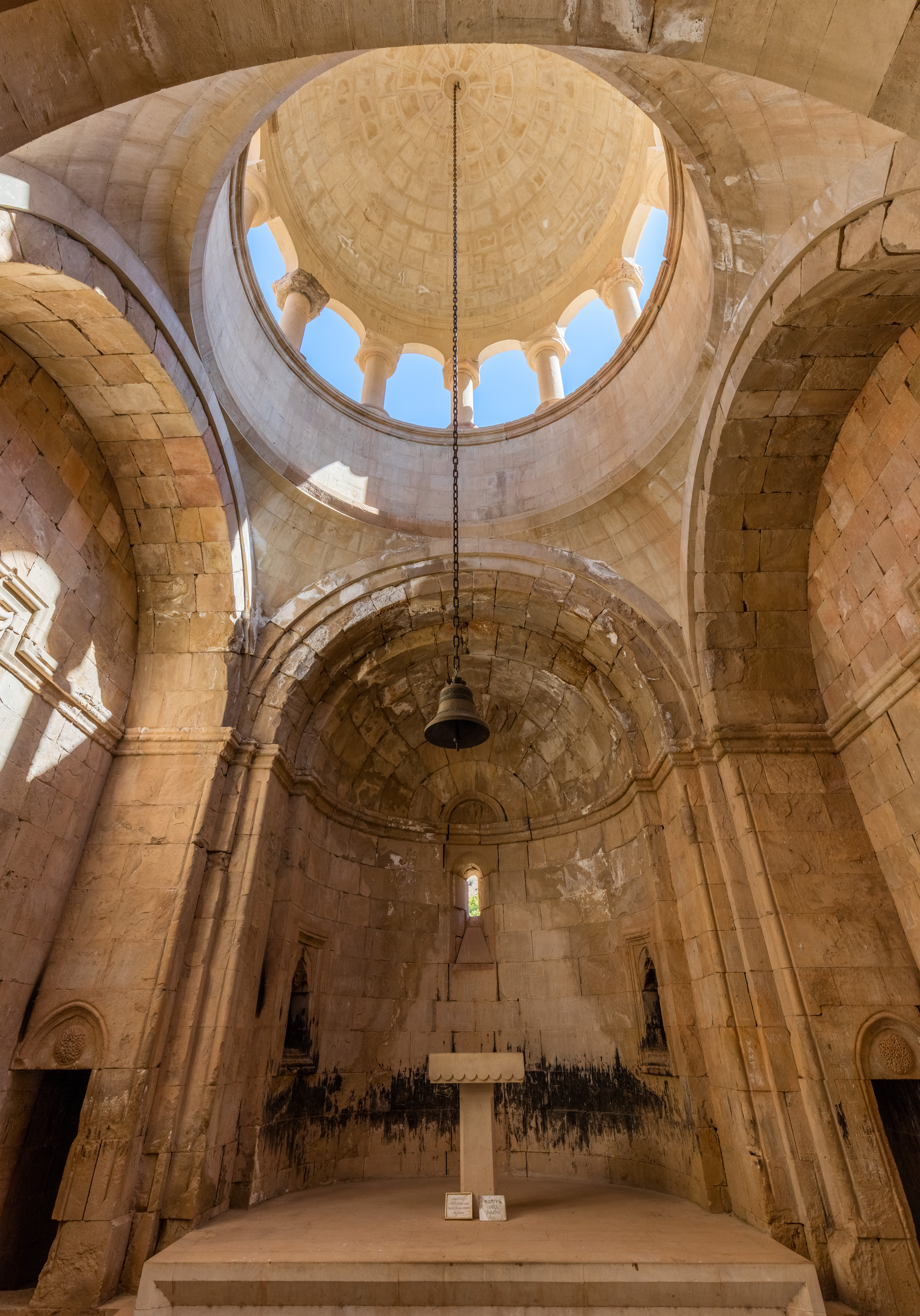
View of the interior of Astvatsatsin church

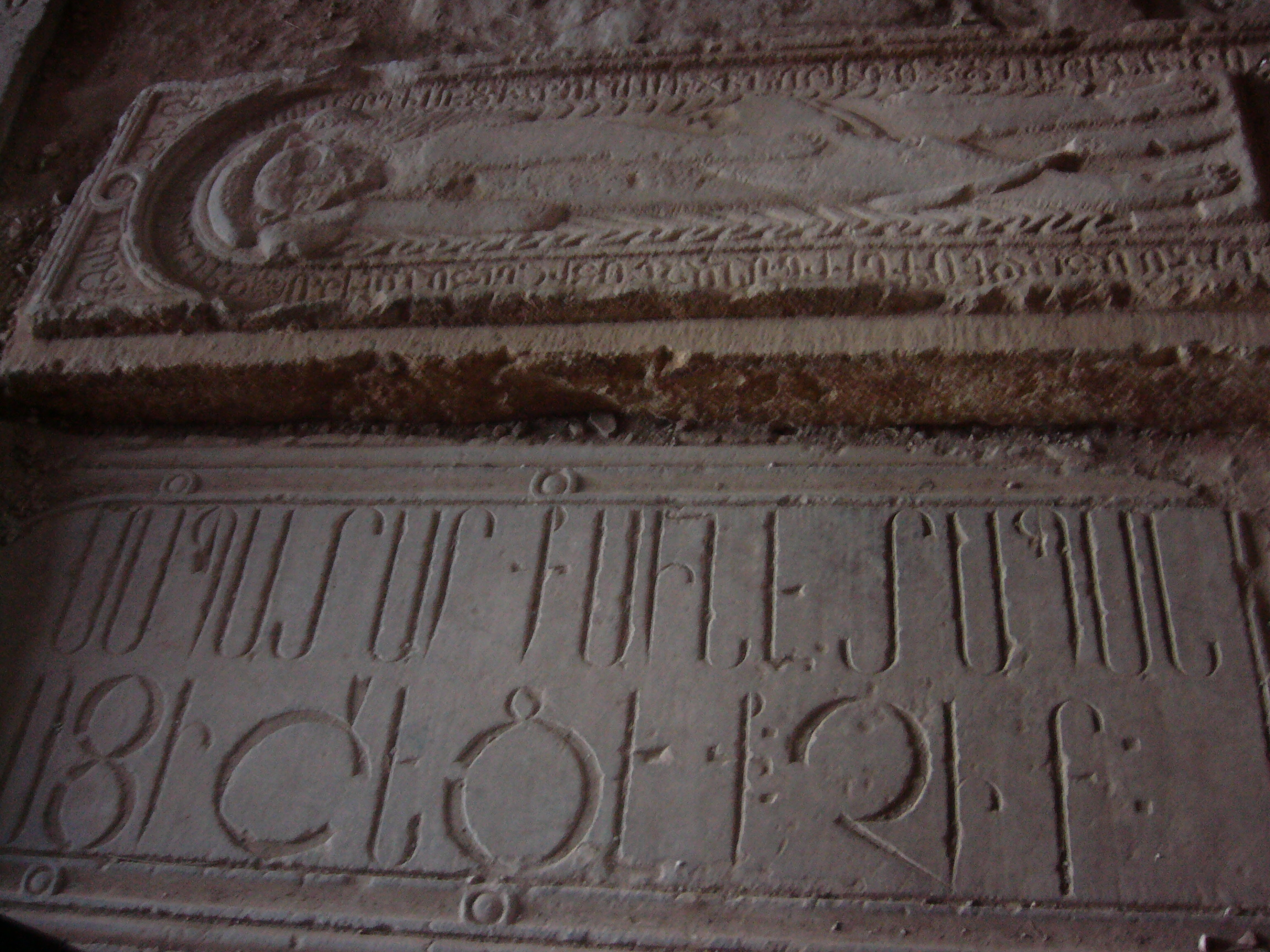
Carved tombstones of Smbat and Elikum III Orbelian, inside the chapel of Surb Grigor

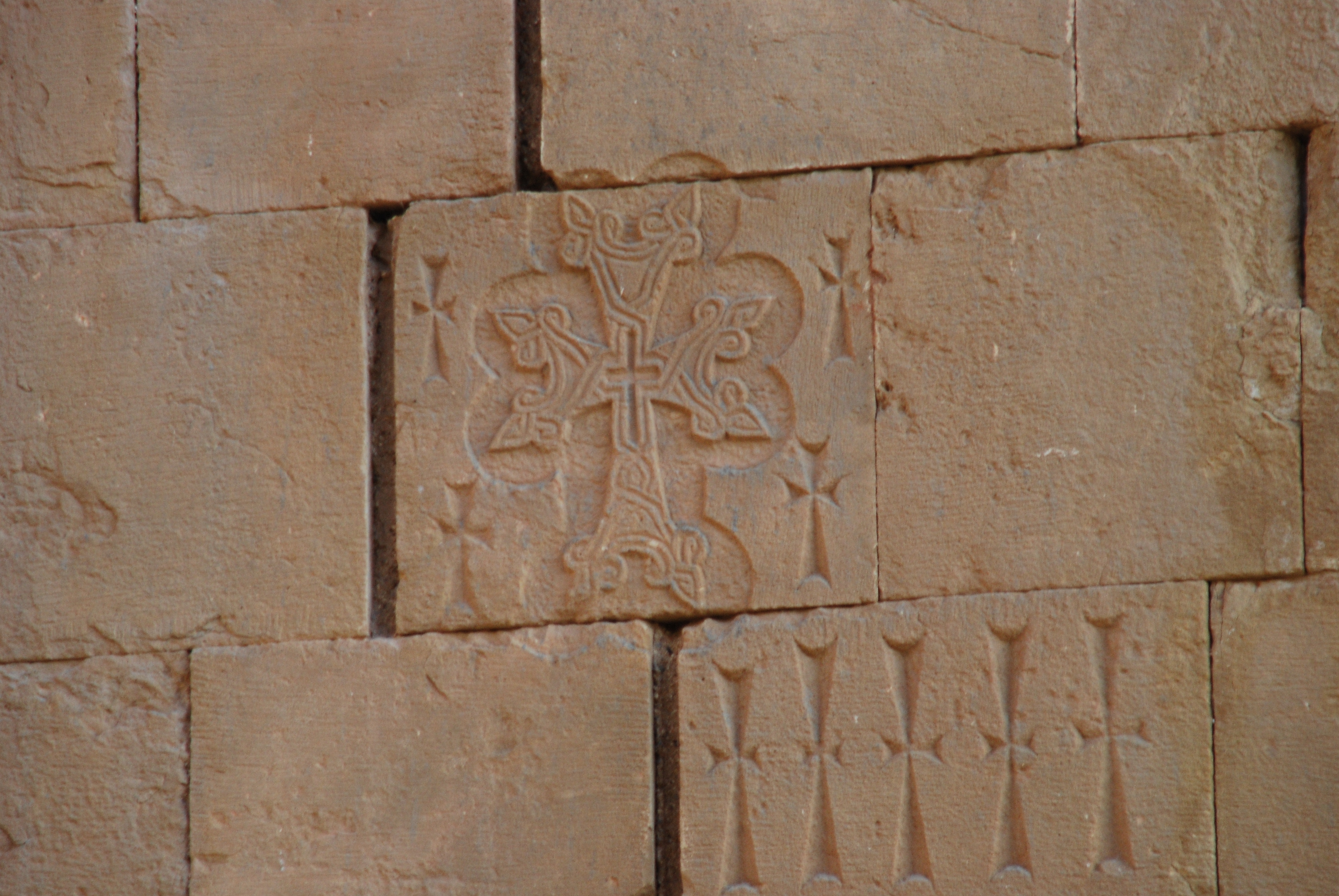
Cross decoration on the walls of Astvatsatsin church

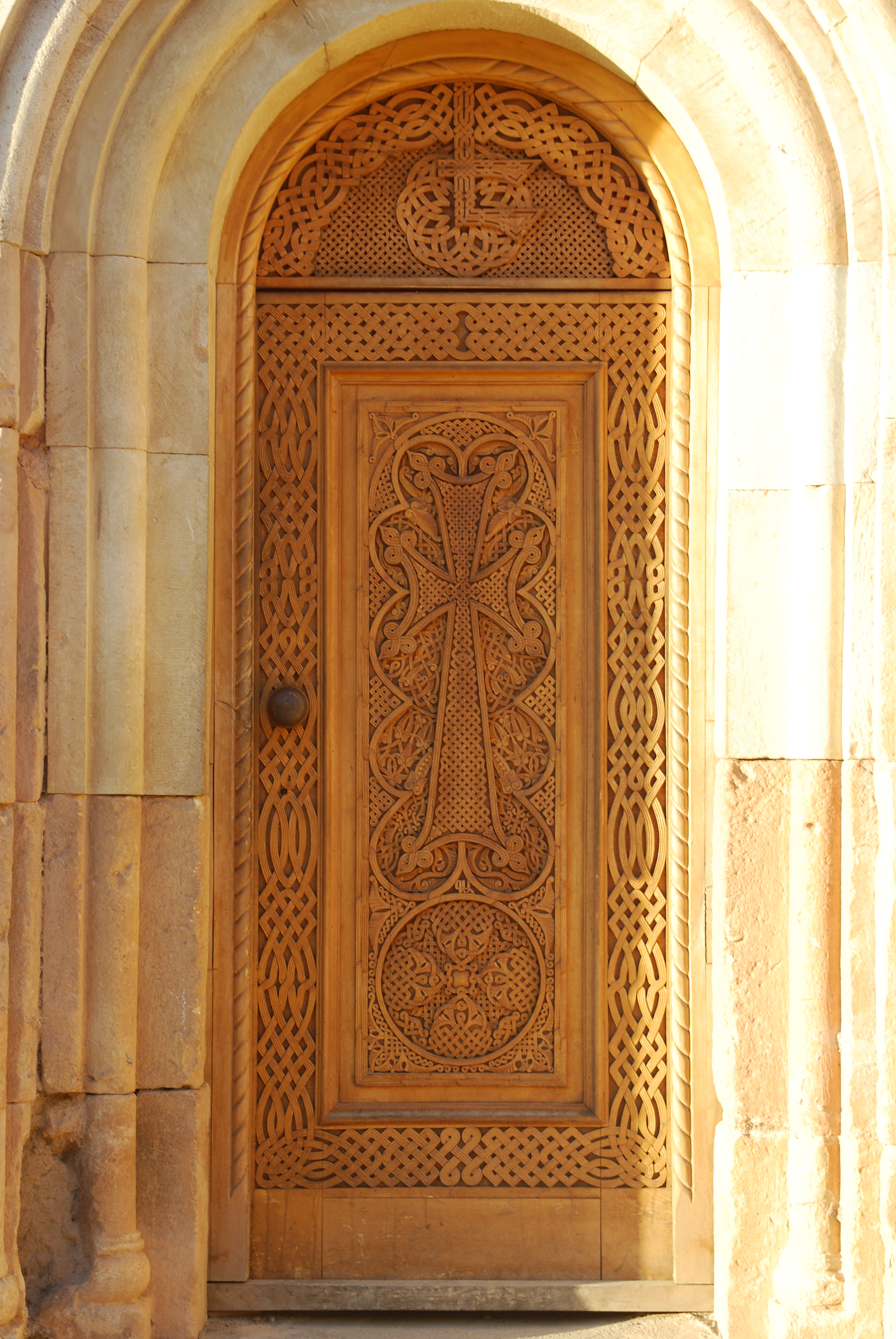
The southern entrance of Surb Karapet church

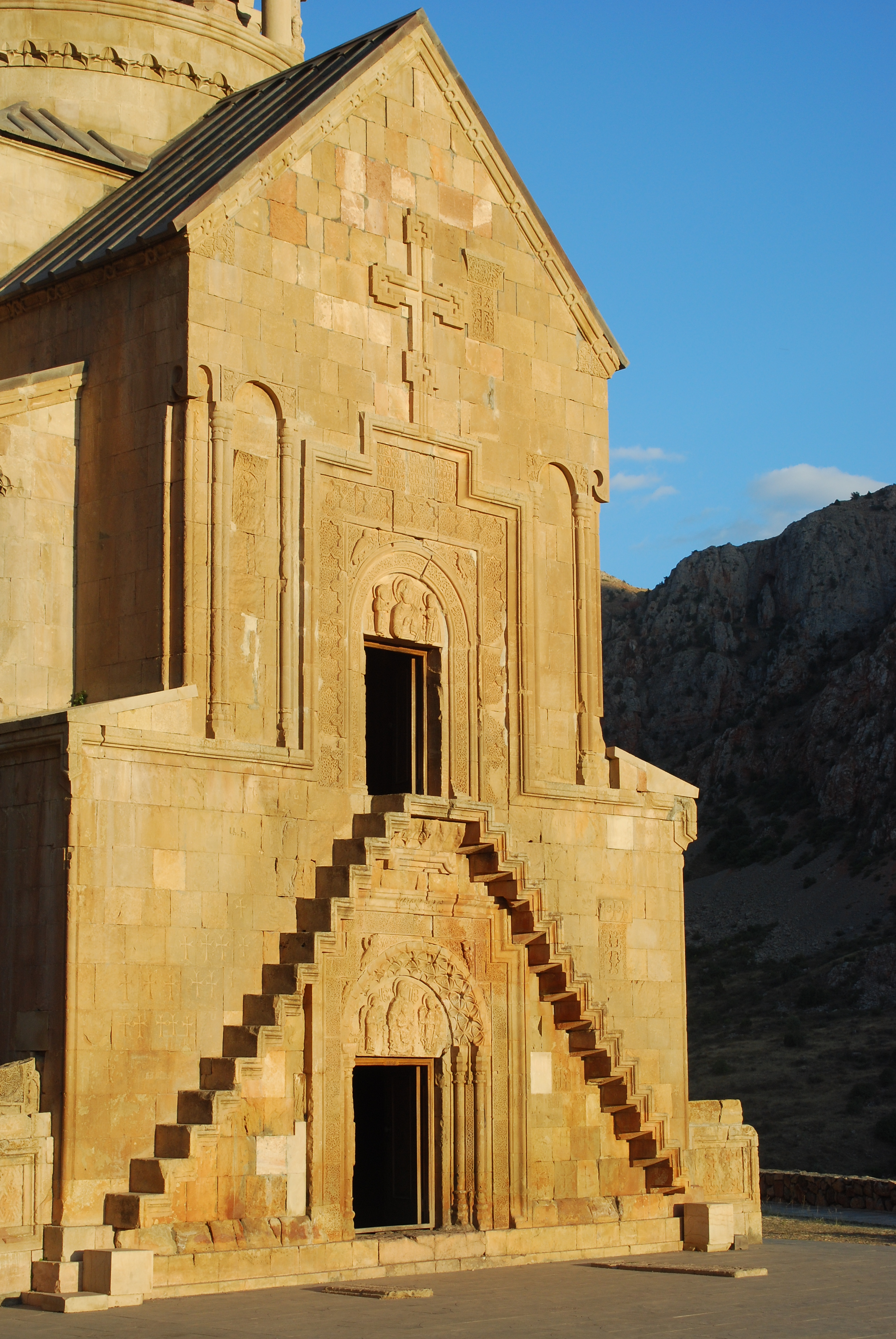
The entrance of Astvatsatsin church (western façade)

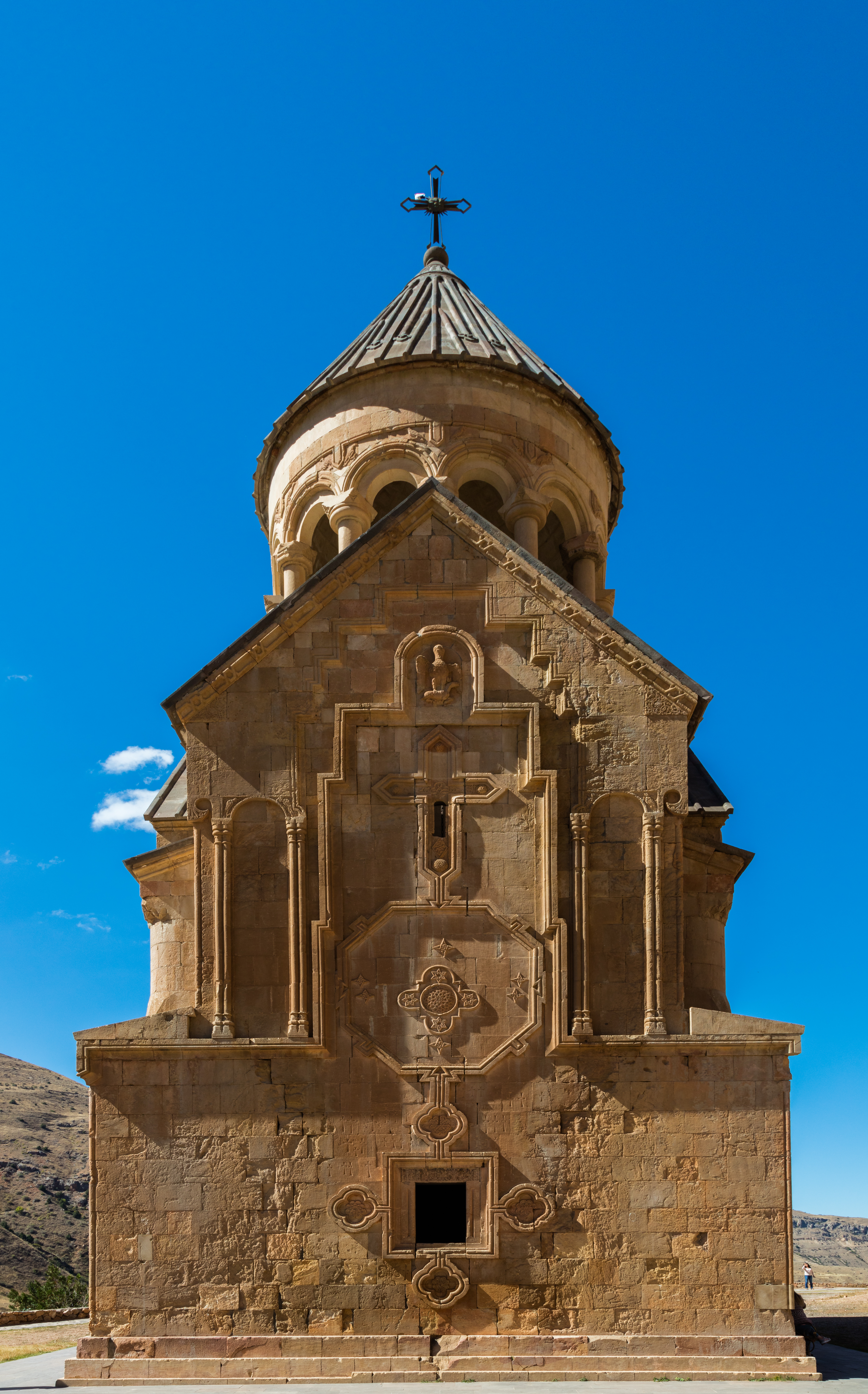
Eastern façade of Astvatsatsin church

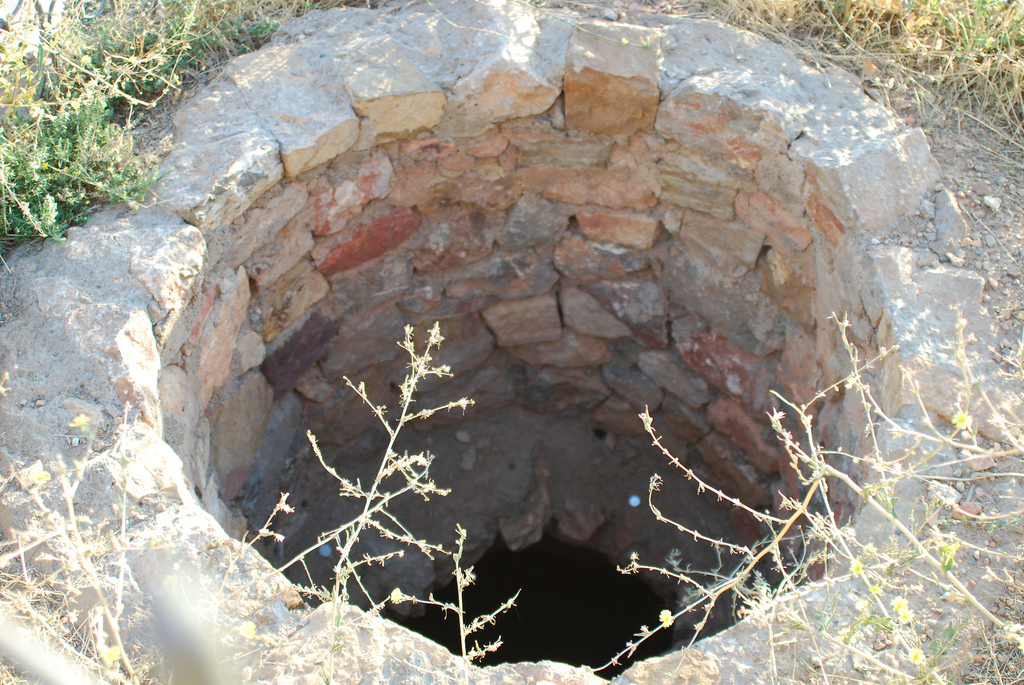
The hole

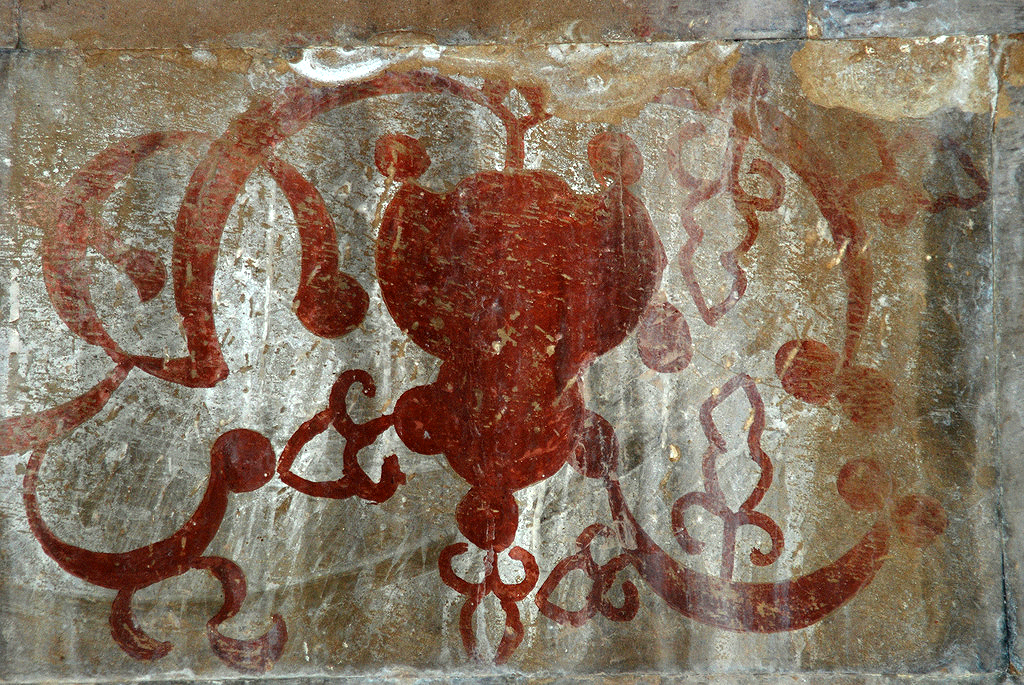
Ornament on the ceiling of the Saint Grigor chapel made with the Vordan Karmir (Cochineal Red) pigment

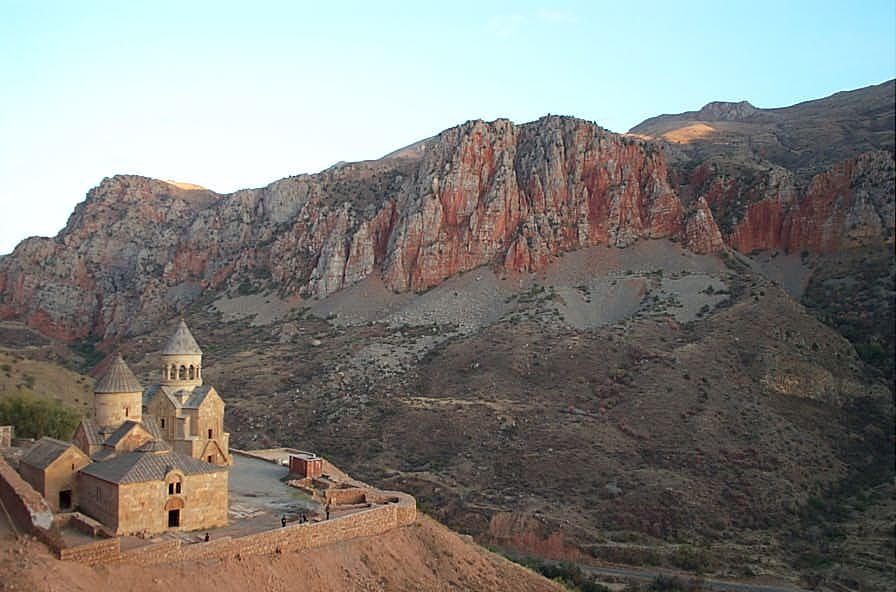
Aerial view

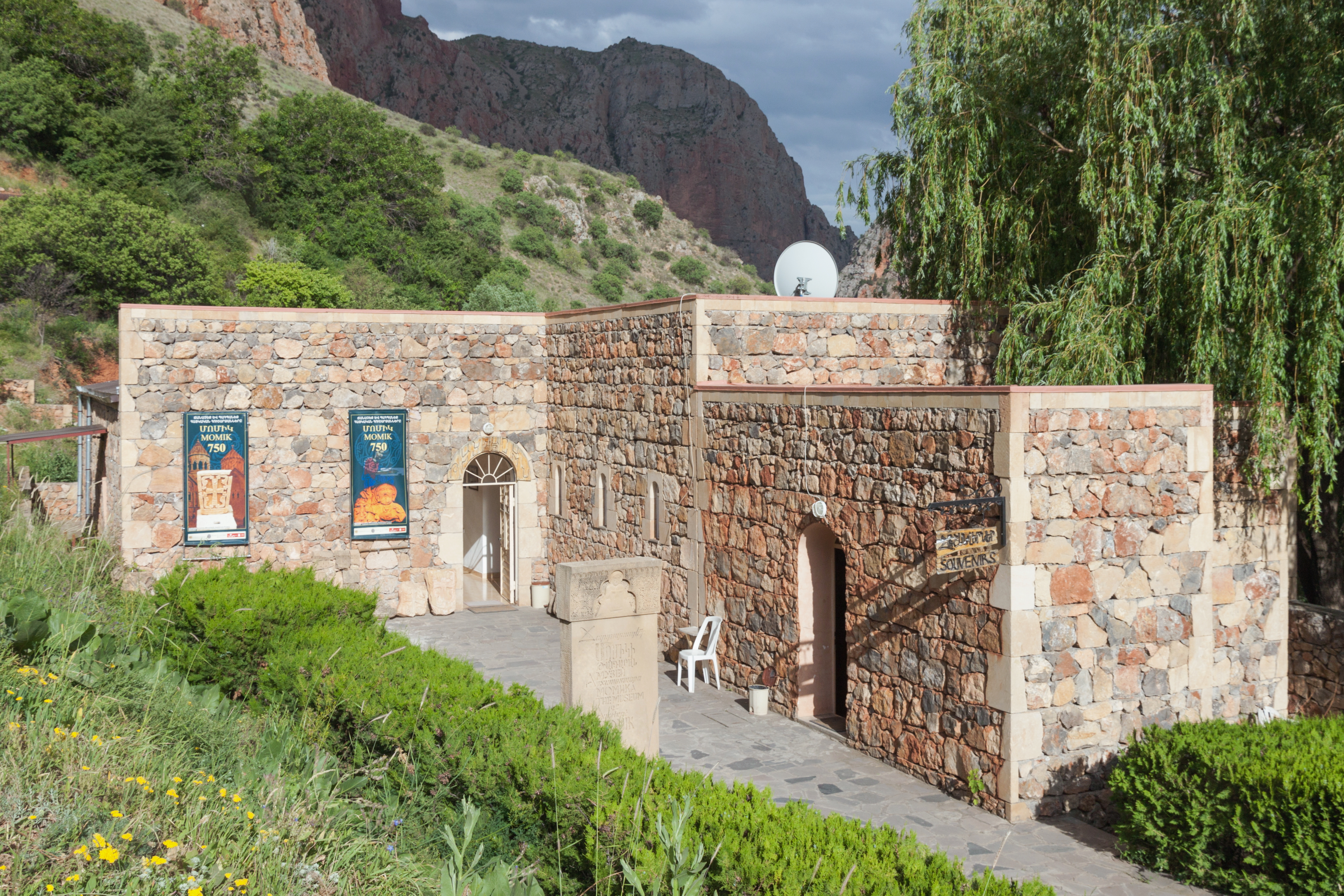
The museum

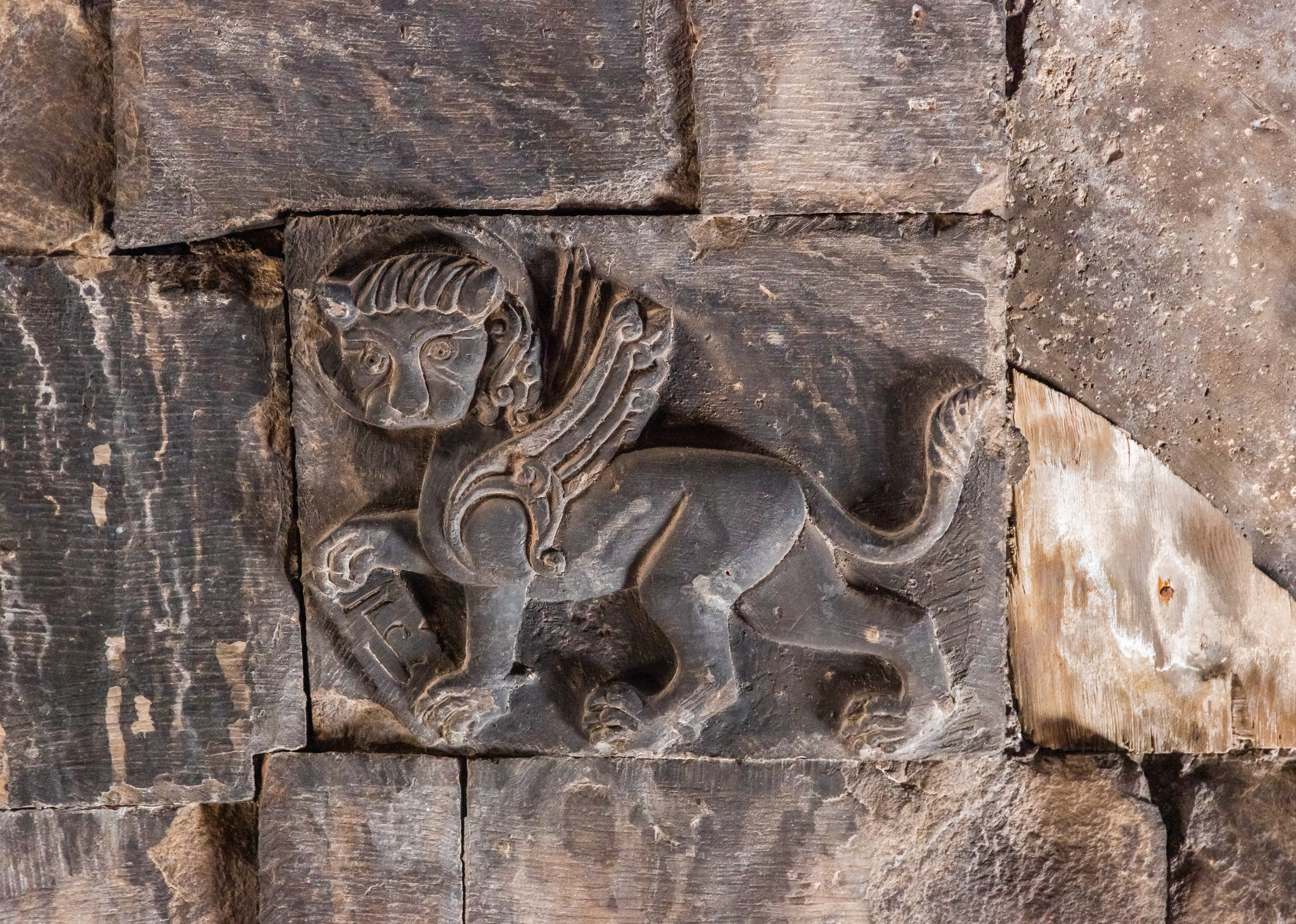
Bas-relief

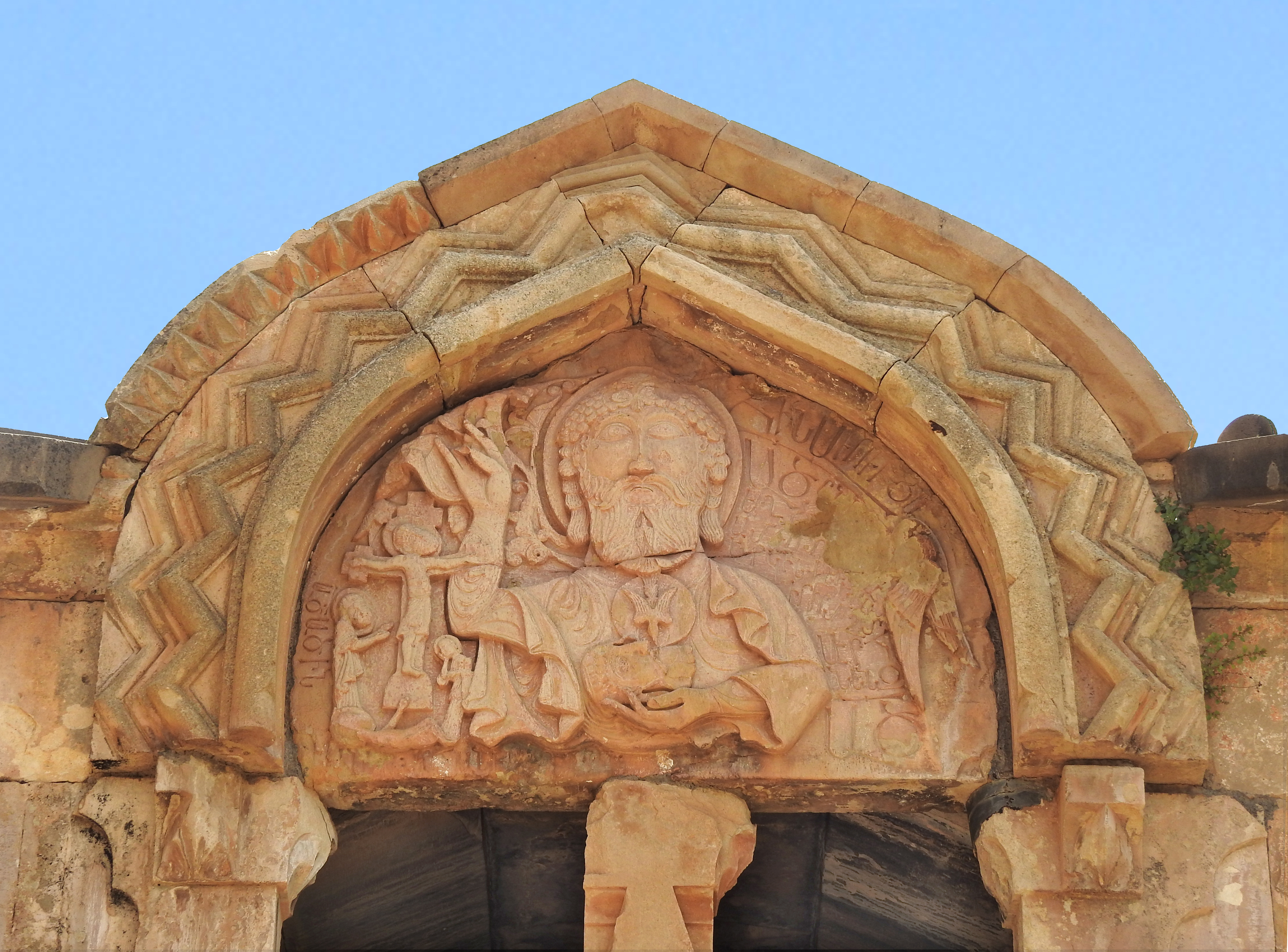
Window tympanum of the Gavit. Interpretation is unclear: God the Father with the head of John the Baptist, Jesus or Adam in his hand, and Jesus on the Cross

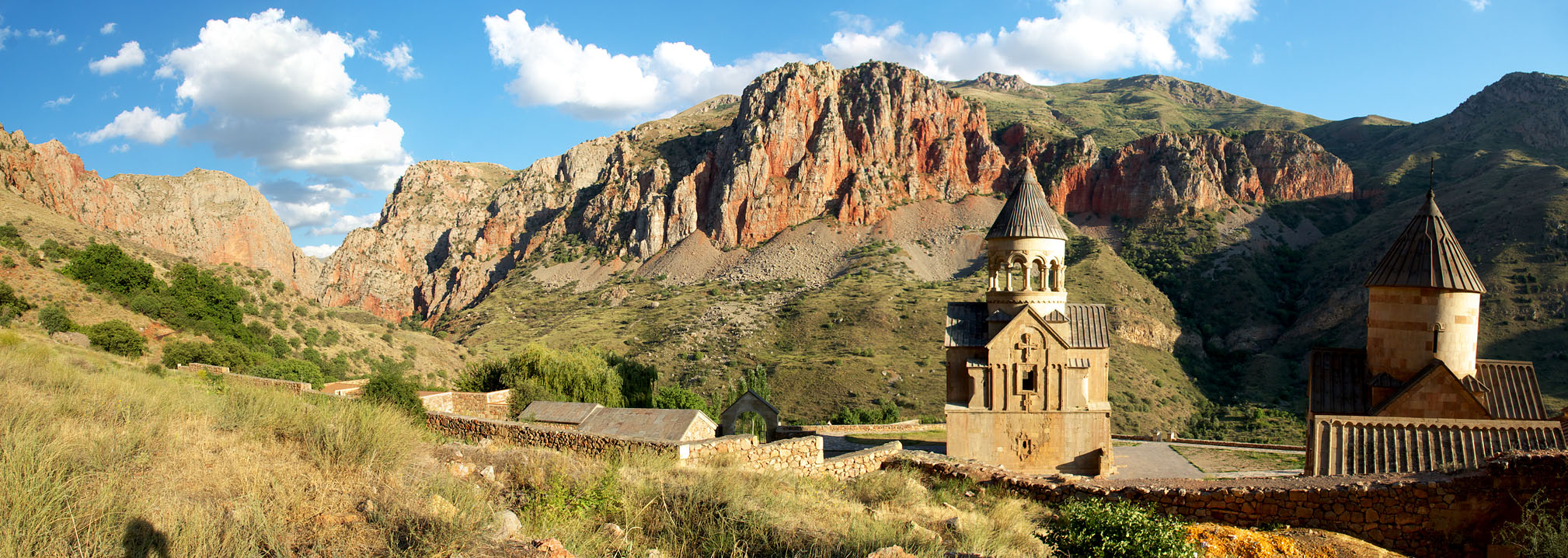
Panorama of Noravank monastery and Amaghu valley

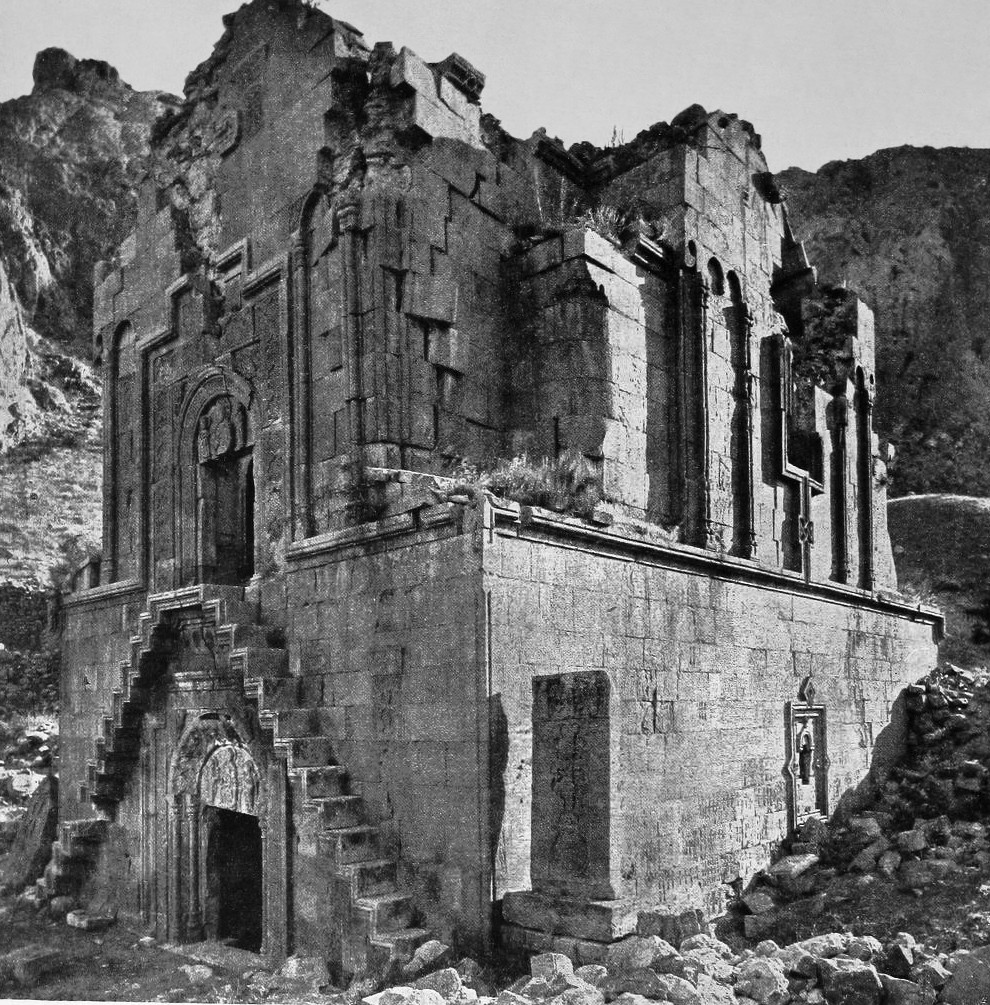
The monastery in the early 20th century

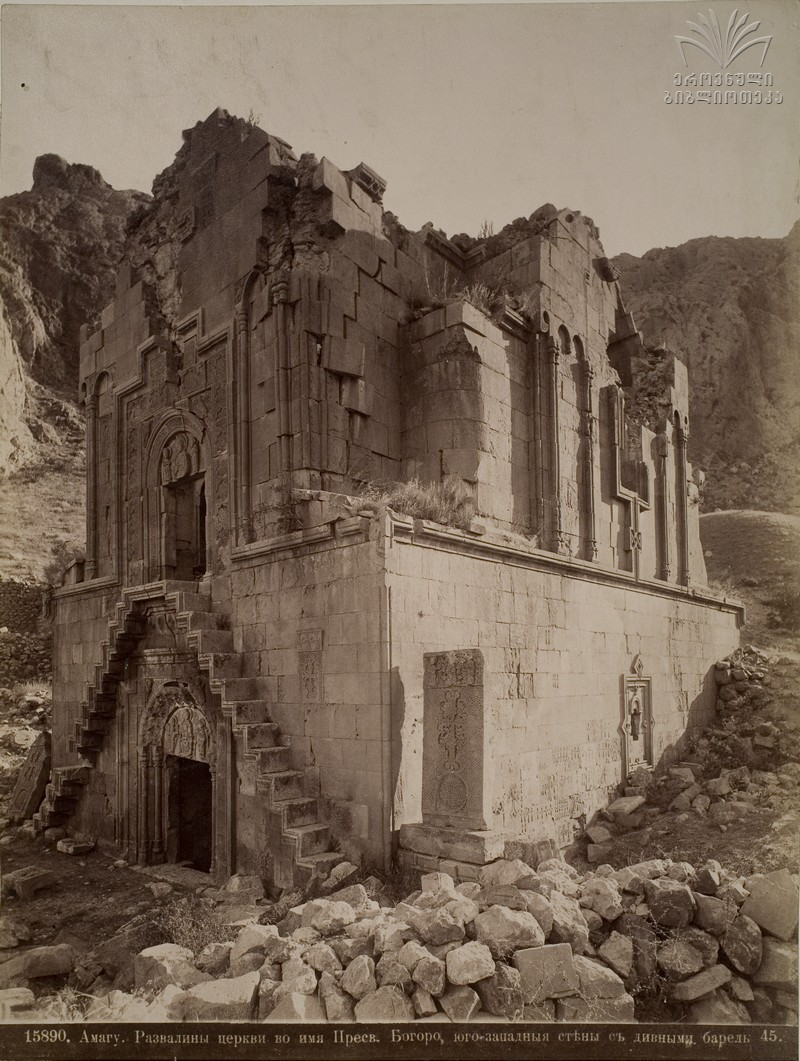

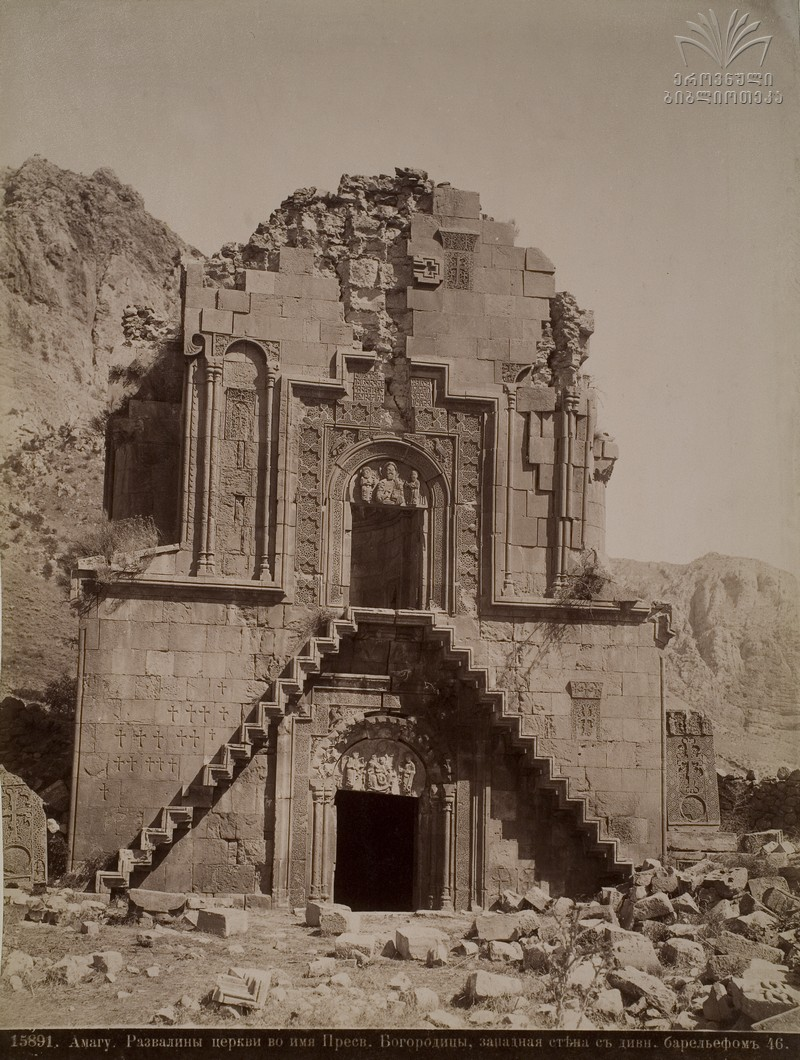

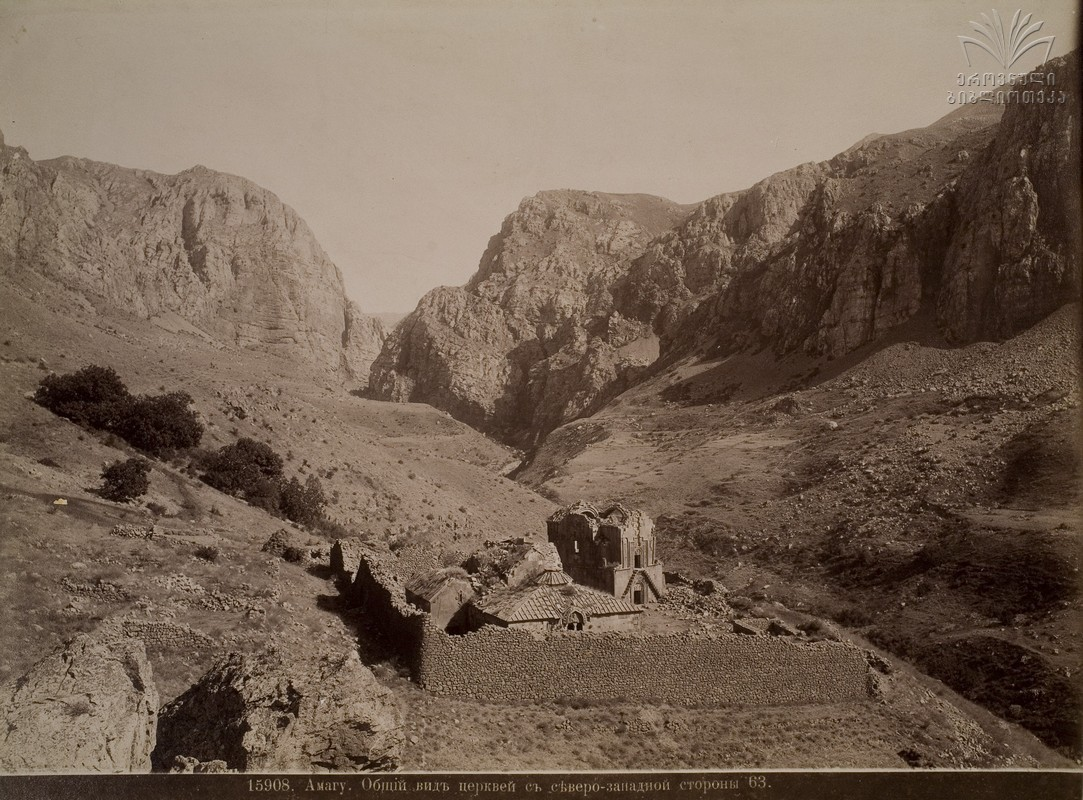

Noravank monastry seen from the opposite side of the Amaghu valley.

== Additional sources ==
- "Architectural Ensembles of Armenia", by O. Khalpakhchian, published in Moscow by Iskusstvo Publishers in 1980.
- "Rediscovering Armenia Guidebook", by Brady Kiesling and Raffi Kojian, published online and printed in 2005.
- History of the Province of Syunik (Patmut'yun Nahangin Sisakan), by Stepahnos Orbelian, 1297.
