= Orbelian dynasty =

Armenian-Georgian noble family

Orbelians Օրբելյաններ
- Nobility
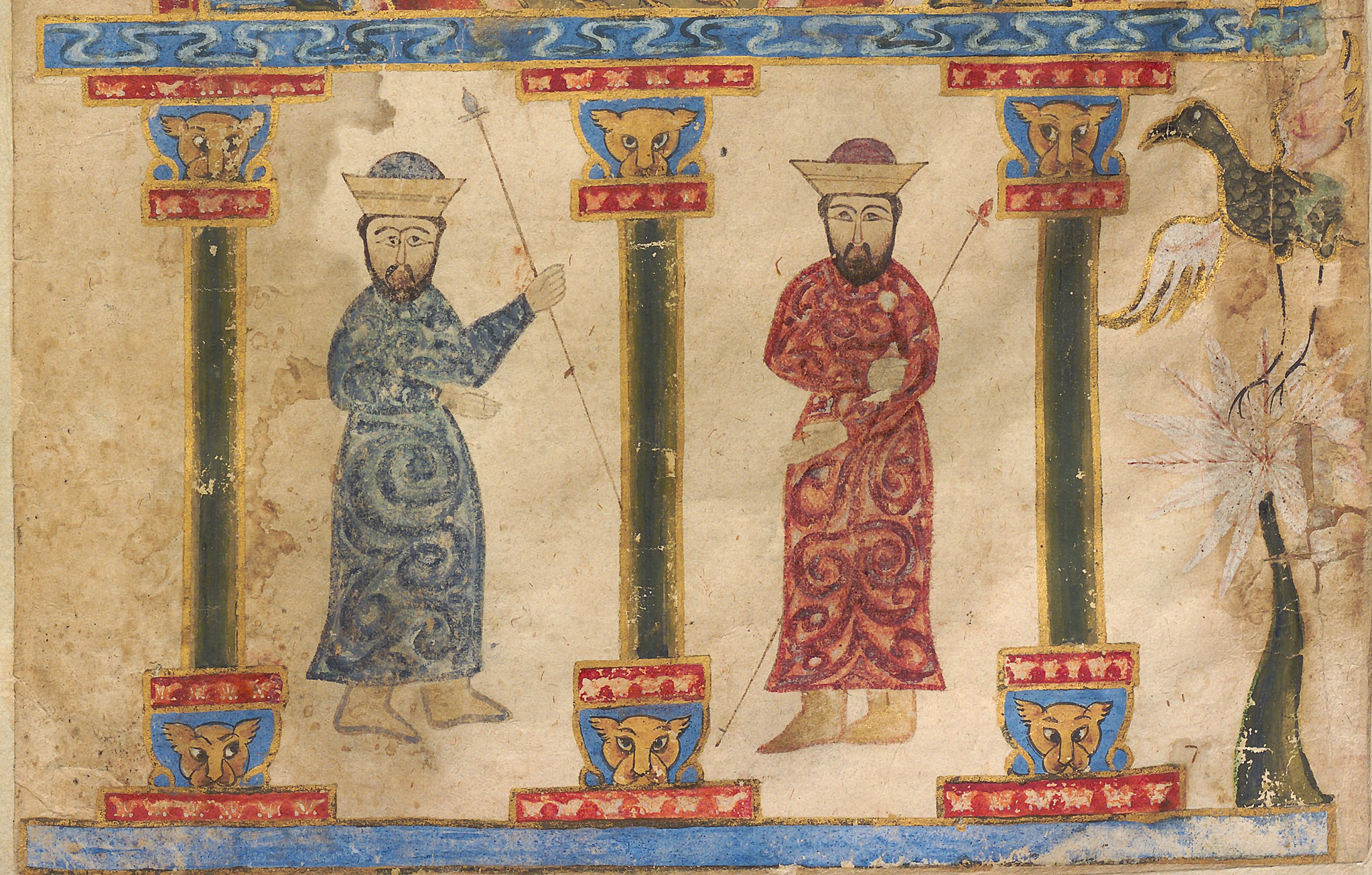
- Princes Bughta and Burtel Orbelian, 1306
- Parent house: Mamikonians
- Country: Kingdom of Georgia
- Founded: 11th Century
- Founder: Liparit
- Dissolution: 15th Century

The House of Orbelian (Armenian: Օրբելյան) was a noble family of Armenia and a dynasty of Armenian lords of the province of Syunik, with a long history of political influence documented in inscriptions throughout the provinces of Vayots Dzor and Syunik, and recorded by the family historian Bishop Stepanos in his 1297 History of Syunik.

== History ==
In historical sources, Ivane Orbeli is mentioned for the first time from this family. The Orbels were especially powerful during the reign of Demetrius I and David V, when their family inherited the name of Amirspasalar, and Lori as an administrative state.

For their bravery and loyal service at the Georgian court, the Orbelians received the hereditary title of commander-in-chief (amirspasalar) of the army and significant territories with a number of fortresses, including the fortress of Orbeti in the south of present-day Georgia, from which the name of the family - Orbeli and then Orbelian - was derived.

In 1177-1178, Amirspasalar Ivane Orbeli led a rebellion against the Georgian king George III, who broke his word and did not enthrone the legitimate heir to the throne, his nephew, Prince Demna. However, King George managed to cause a split among the rebels, luring most of them to his side (including the Armenian princes Zakarids, who later received the hereditary title of Amirspasalars - commanders-in-chief of the Armenian-Georgian army). Ivane sent his brother Liparit and nephews Elikum and Ivane to the Eldiguzids in Tabriz for help, but this new army came too late, after Ivane had been surrendered to King George and was barbarously killed by him in 1177. Together with him many Orbelians were exterminated, their possessions were lost, and young Demna blinded and castrated, the Orbelians who survived were expelled from Georgia and moved to Armenia.

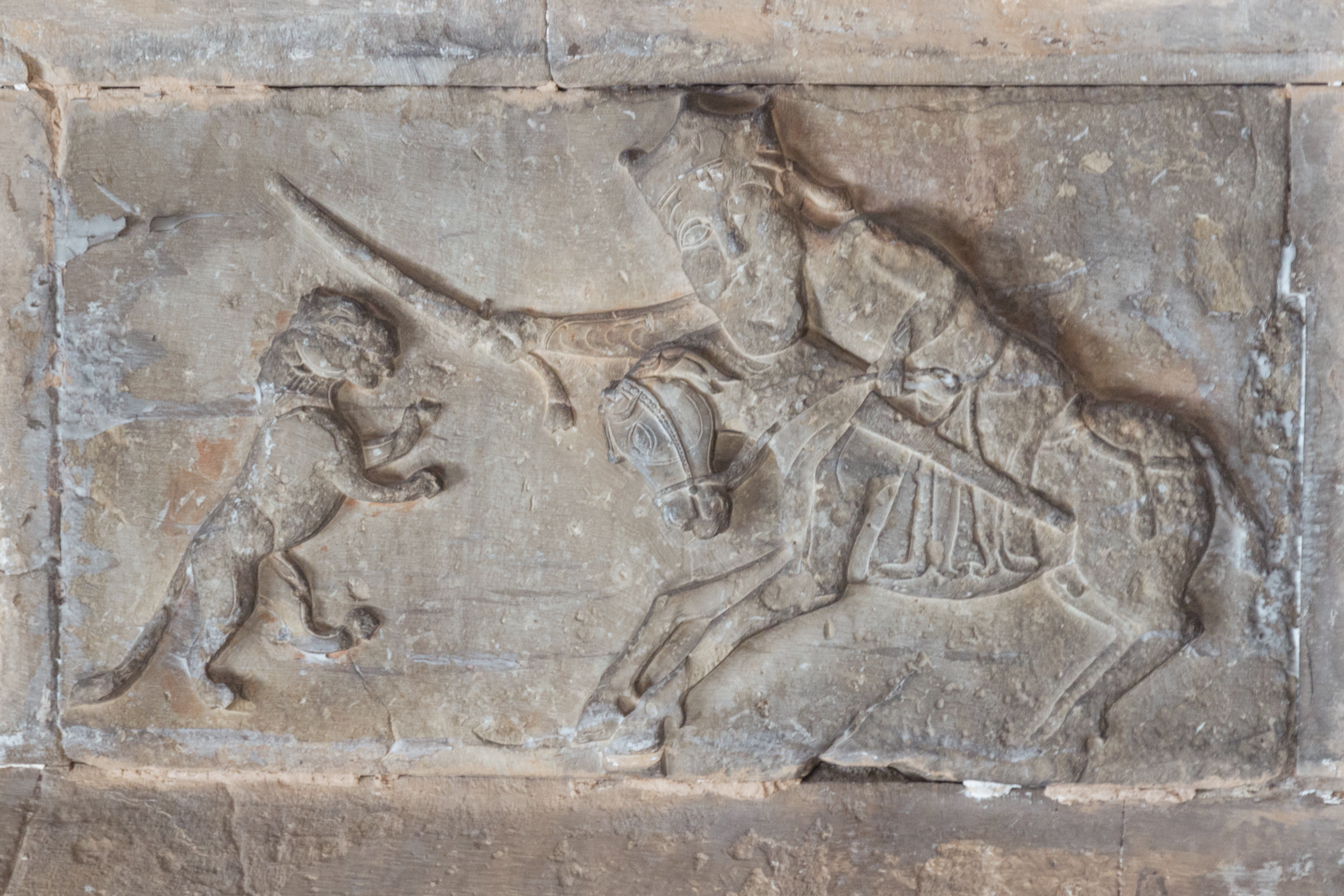
Orbelian king hunting a lion, Noravank, late 13th to early 14th century

At the end of the 12th century, the Kingdom of Georgia, together with their Armenian subjects, fought against the Seljuks. In order to further unite the Armenian-Georgian nobility around her throne, Queen Tamar, daughter of George III, pardoned all those who had rebelled against her father and allowed them to return to Georgia. Among others, Ivane, the youngest son of Liparit II Orbelian, returned to Georgia, who received only a small part of his former family holdings around the fortress of Orbeti. The eldest son of Liparit II Orbelian, Elikum I, continued the Armenian branch of the Orbelian family in Syunik. When Elikum I was killed in 1184, the Orbelian family in Syunik was led by his son, Liparit III, who was released from captivity. Thanks to the mediation of Ivane Zakarian, who commanded the conflict, King George IV Lasha appointed Liparit III Orbelian as viceroy and granted him vast possessions in the north-eastern provinces of Armenia - in Syunik and its provinces of Gegharkunik, Vayots Dzor, as well as the castle of Kayen and the village of Elar with its surroundings in Kotayk.

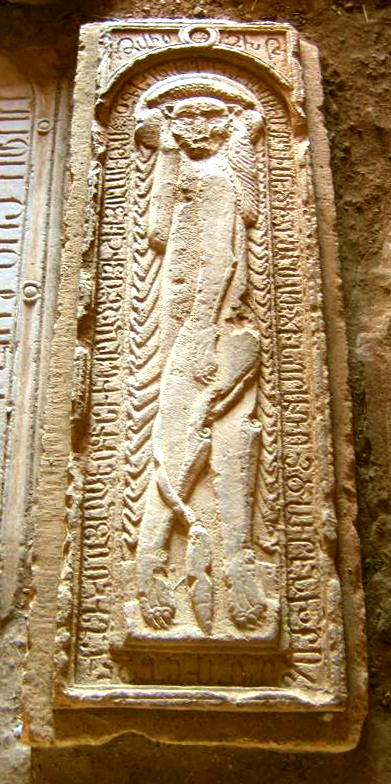
Grave of Elikum III Orbelian (died 1300), son of Prince Tarsaich Orbelian, in Noravank. He is depicted as a lion "who roars in front of enemy troops".

In 1236, the Mongols under the command of Chormaqan invaded Georgia. The Georgians and Armenians were defeated and were forced to recognise the authority of the Khan in Karakorum. The descendant of Liparit III, Elikum Orbelian, did the same. After negotiations with the Mongols, he retained his possessions, but undertook to participate with his troops in further campaigns of the Mongols. Later, thanks to personal relations with the great Khan in Karakorum, Smbat II managed to strengthen the position of the Orbelian family considerably.

When in 1249 a rebellion against the Mongol yoke rose in Georgia, Smbat II Orbelian did not dare to openly join the rebels, although secretly, apparently, sympathised with them (so, through his vassal nobleman Tancregul, Smbat helped the king David Narin to escape from the Mongol captivity). Smbat II himself managed to prove in the Mongol capital Karakorum that he was not involved in the rebellion.

After the death of Möngke Khan in 1259, the Georgian court and some Armenian nobles again revolted against the Mongol yoke. The rebellion was organised by Hasan-Jalal Dola, and Zakare III Zakarian. This time Smbat II Orbelian was even more cautious and did not support the rebels at all. The rebellion was suppressed in 1261. The Mongol rulers appreciated the loyalty of Smbat II; after the suppression of the rebellion, he received the title of "king" and was transferred to the Mongol headquarters in Tabriz, where he died in 1273.

The next ruler of Syunik Principality was his younger brother, Tarsaich Orbelian, who ruled until 1290.

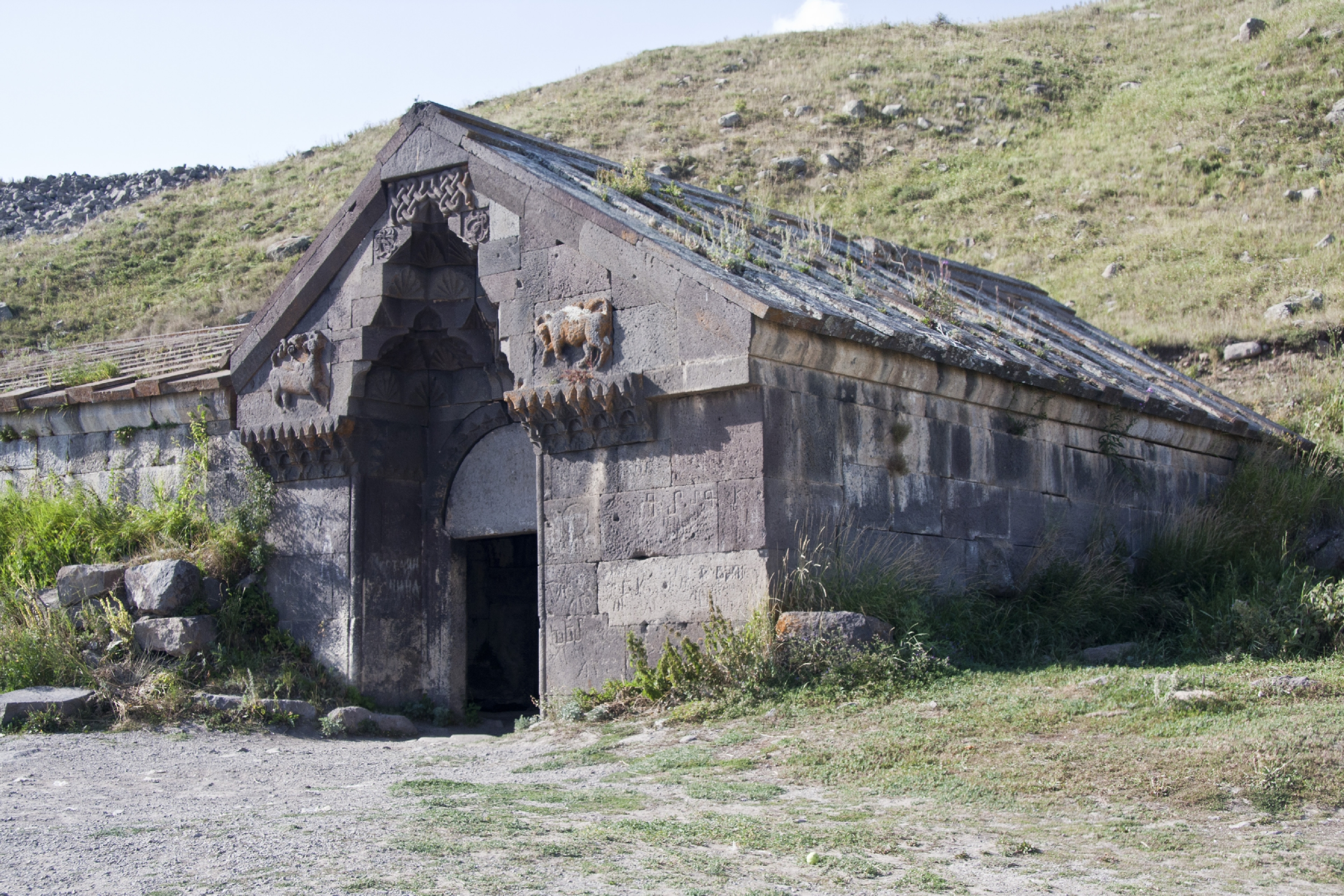
Orbelian's Caravanserai, 1332

After the death of Tarsaich, there were disputes between his sons and his nephew Liparit over part of the Orbelian land holdings: Dvin, Garni and Bargushat. The eldest son of Tarsaich, Elikum Orbelian (ruled in 1290-1300), established on a princely throne, divided possessions of Orbelians between the brothers, thus weakening the dynasty.

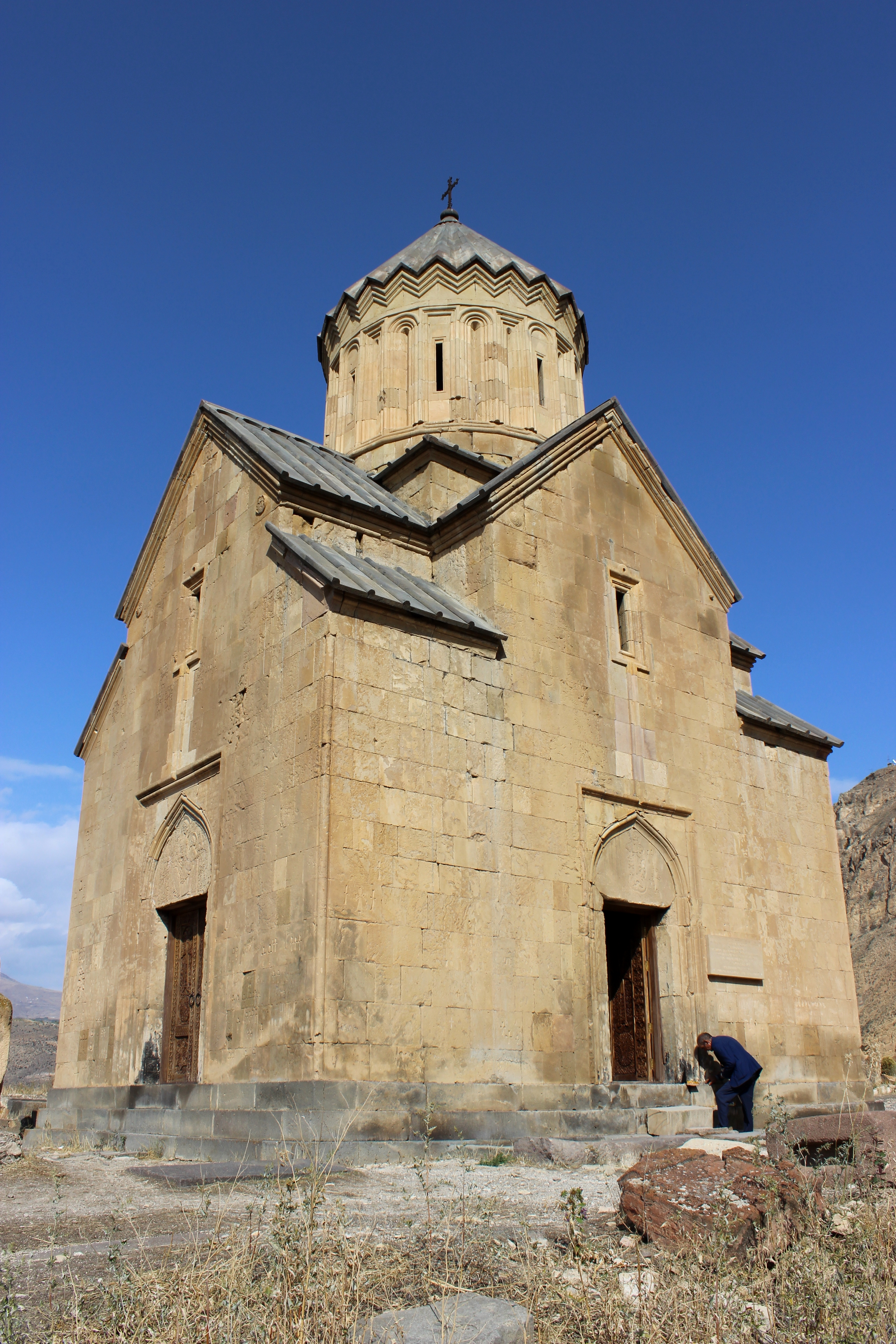
The Church of Areni was built in 1321 by Bishop Yovhannes Orbelian under the artistic supervisation of Momik.

Burtel, who succeeded Elikum II, became the ancestor of a collateral branch of the Orbelians - the Burtelians. After Burtel's death and with the invasion of Turkmen tribes and Tamerlane in 1385, the Syunik princedom ruled by the Orbelians fell into decline. The Syunik prince Smbat Orbelian, besieged in the fortress of Vorotnaberd, was captured and sent with his family to Samarkand, from where he returned after forced conversion to Islam. His son, Beshken, was forced to leave the Orbelian fiefdom and moved to Lori. Beshken's son Rustam Orbelian became a counsellor and high-ranking nobleman in Tabriz, continuing to own part of the Orbelian hereditary lands in Syunik and Ayrarat. However, after the defeat of Tabriz troops at Sofyan in 1437, Rustam Orbelian was forced to leave Syunik and move to Lori, selling his lands to the Tatev Monastery.

Although many representatives of the Orbelian princely family continued to live in Syunik, the family lost its former influence and split into a number of small side branches. Many melik (princely) families of Syunik in the 16th-19th centuries traced their genealogy back to the Orbelian princes, among them the Orbelian meliks of Tatev.
