= Momik =

Armenian architect and sculptor (died 1333)

- Մոմիկ
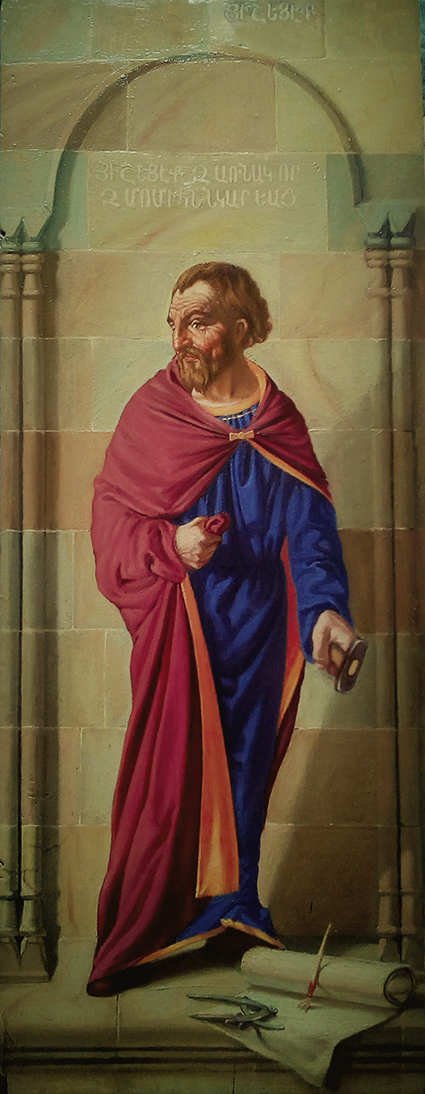
- Born: 13th century
- Died: 1333; Noravank
- Known for: Illuminated manuscripts

Momik (Vayots Dzor, Armenian: Մոմիկ; died 1333) was an Armenian architect, sculptor and a master artist of Armenian illuminated manuscripts. As a sculptor, Momik is also known for his fine carving of khachkars, found primarily at the monastery complex at Noravank. He held an eminent position at the Gladzor School of Illuminated Manuscripts in Syunik, established at Vayots Dzor under the patronage of the Orbelian family's historian, Stepanos Orbelian. Of the manuscripts authored by Momik, only several survive: one is found at the repository of the Mekhitarist Order in Vienna and three others are found at the Mashtots Institute of Ancient Manuscripts in Yerevan, Armenia.

Momik was the author of the miniatures for the Gospel, "Entombment" and "Angel Appearing to Holy Women", created in Glazdor in 1302, of the building of Astvatsatsin church in Areni village (1321), of its wonderful reliefs and of a number of khachkars. He also designed and carved the masterpiece church of S. Astvatsatsin at Noravank Monastery in Armenia.

== Biography ==
Momik lived and worked in the 13th-14th centuries in Armenia (in the world of Syunik). He resided with the Yritsak Master, whom the great Armenian regarded as his grandfather, although the latter was not biologically related to him.

Momik fled Ani alongside Yeritsak and settled in an exceedingly impoverished village.

It is postulated that his activity commenced within the region of Cilicia, with a pivotal event occurring in 1283 when a Gospel flourished under the directive of Queen Kera. This notable occurrence significantly contributed to his subsequent renown within academic and historical contexts.

Momik was the artist-architect of the Orbelian house. On a certain occasion, the historian Stepanos Orbelyan extended an invitation to forty stonemasons at Noravank, challenging them to sculpt the most expeditious one-inch cross. In this competition, the victory was secured by Momik, a sixteen-year-old participant, as a result of which Stepanos Orbelyan said, "If the stone obeys his will like a candlestick, then let's give him the first prize and the nickname Momik ".

Following Stepanos Orbelian's death in 1305, Momik began carving a khachkar in honor of the great historian, completing in 1306.

Under some of his works, he put the signature "Momik Master", by which he was known. He died in 1333 in Noravank, near the village of Amaghu in Vayots Dzor.

== The Legend of Master Momik ==
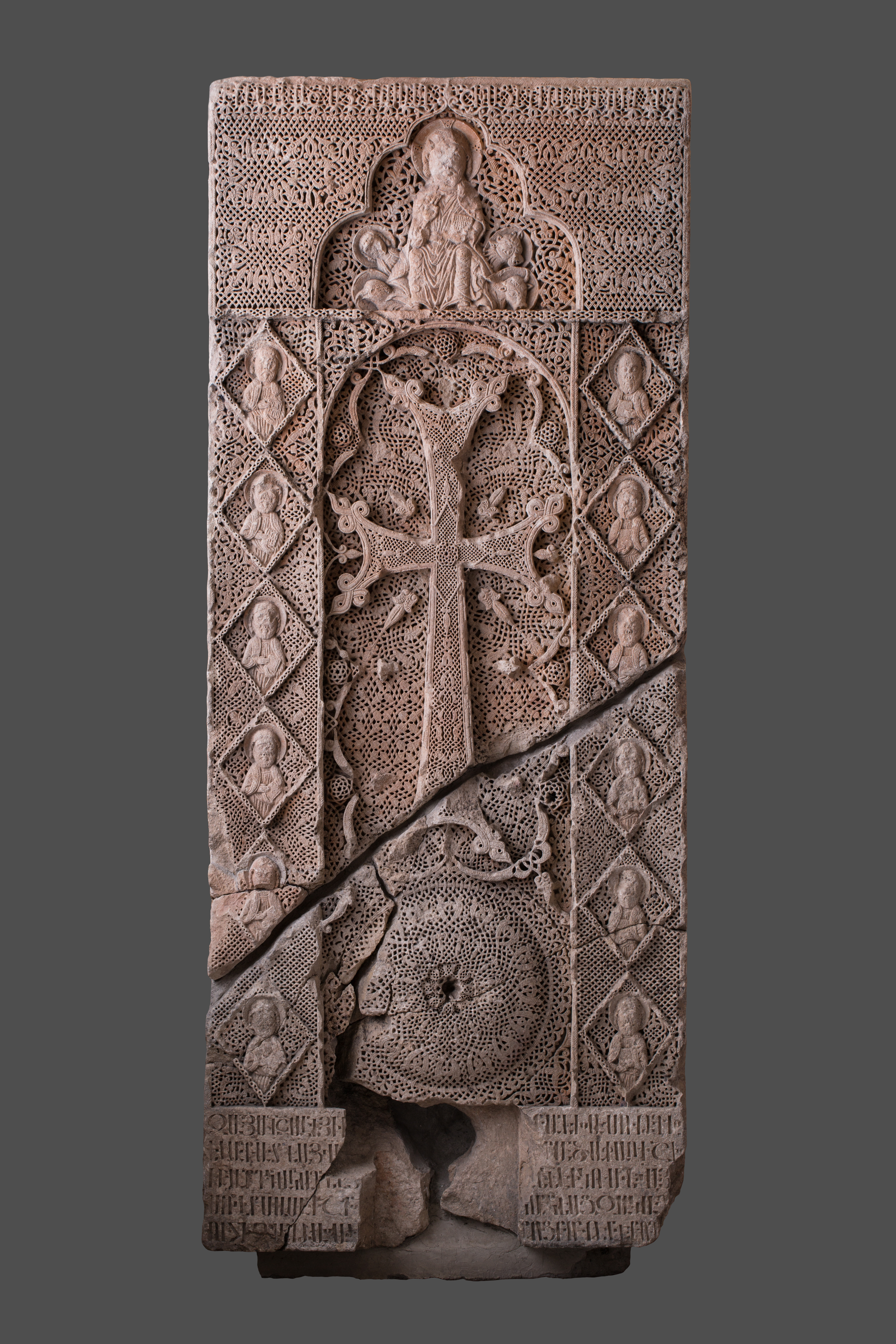
Khackar from Noravank 1300-1312 carved by Momik

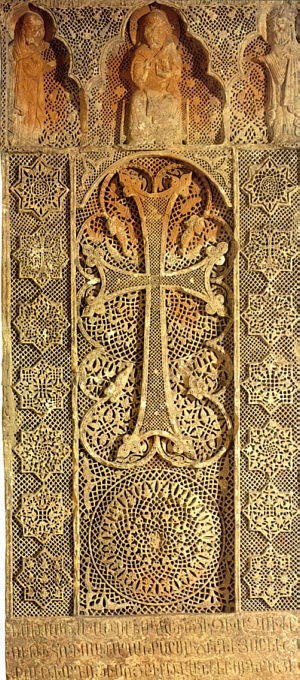
Khatchk’ar cross carved in 1308 by Momik, considered as a high point of openwork sculpture techniques.

Momik falls in love with the beautiful daughter of Orbelyan prince. The prince pledges to wed the girl to the Master under the stipulation that Momik can construct a splendid temple within a brief timeframe. As the completion of the monastery construction approached, the prince instructed his servant to obstruct Momik from fulfilling his condition by any means necessary.

The servant secretly climbs up to the foreman working on the dome of the monastery, pushes him and throws down. The Master is buried in the fallen place, in the yard of the monastery he built, and the construction of the dome is completed by his students.

== Momik's works ==
Remains of his works:

- Books
  - Four handwritten Gospels: the Gospels of 1292, 1302 (or the Gospel of Stepanos Orbelyan), 1283 (unsigned), the collection of 1283-84.
- Sculptures
  - The Cross stone of 1308 in Noravank, the image of the Mother of God and the Child in Areni church (1321), the sculptures of the Mother of God and God the Father in the porch of Noravank. He also carved a cross-stone for Lady Tamta Zakarian.
- Architectural structures
  - The vestibule of the Noravank church, the Areni church, the two-story tomb-church of Prince Burtel in Noravank, Zorats church of Yeghegis, and St. Grigor's church of Tatev are also attributed to him.
- Supposedly:
  - The design and partial construction of Burtelashen Church

== Bibliography ==
- Jannic Durand, Ioanna Rapti et Dorota Giovannoni (dir.), Armenia sacra — Mémoire chrétienne des Arméniens (IV-XVIII), Somogy / Musée du Louvre, Paris, 2007 ISBN 978-2-7572-0066-7
- Thomas F. Mathews et Avedis Krikor Sanjian, Armenian Gospel Iconography: The Tradition of the Glajor Gospel, Dumbarton Oaks, Washington, 1991ISBN 978-0-8840-2183-4
- Matenadaran Mashtots Institute of ancient Manuscripts, Miniaturist Momik, introduction de Karen Matevosyan & Lilit Zakaryan, dirigé par Hrachya Tamrazyan, trad. en anglais Gohar Muradyan, éd. Nairi, Erevan 2010 (format 60 x 84, 66 pages) ISBN 978-5-550-01635-0
