= Archaeology of Armenia =

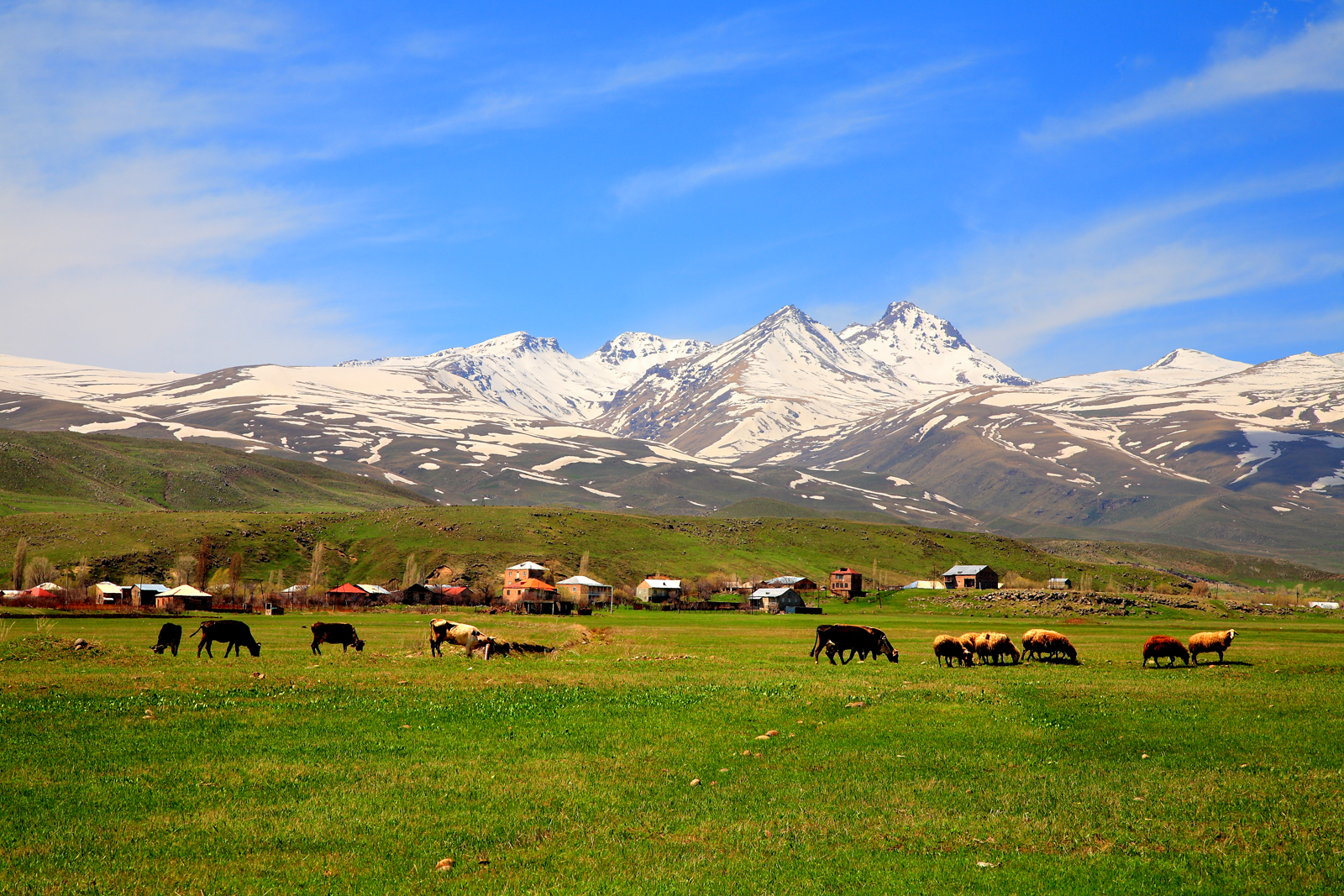
The Aragats Mountain slopes, where Stone Age sites have been identified.

Archaeology in Armenia has revealed many significant historical findings. Armenia is rich in Bronze Age sites and several Stone Age sites were recently identified on the slopes of the Aragats Mountain and are currently being excavated by Armenian and international teams. Archaeological excavations have taken place in the territory which is now the Republic of Armenia since about the mid-19th century. Many sites, ranging from Stone Age to Early Iron Age, have been discovered and at least partly excavated. For the preservation and reconstruction of archaeological sites in Armenia, suggestions, and solutions have been proposed by L. Kirakosyan from National University of Architecture and Construction of Armenia.

== Stone Age archaeology discoveries (2,500,000 ~ 3000 B.C) ==
Evidence of prehistoric humankind have been found in caves and open air settlements in Armenia. Tools made from flint, obsidian, basalt and other materials from the Stone Age indicate that Neanderthals lived in present-day Armenia. Use of obsidian in Armenia developed especially during the Neolithic period. Especially in the Syunik region, obsidian was exported to Iran and further to Mesopotamia.

The current Republic of Armenia is located within the Armenian Highlands and is at the crossroads connecting Africa and Eurasia. As a result, Armenia will be important in comprehending the early stages of human activities and the emergence of ancient civilizations in the Near East and beyond. Starting from the end of 19th century, Stone Age sites and artefacts have been discovered and excavated, which is evidences toward the Stone Age population in this area.

=== Leather shoe ===
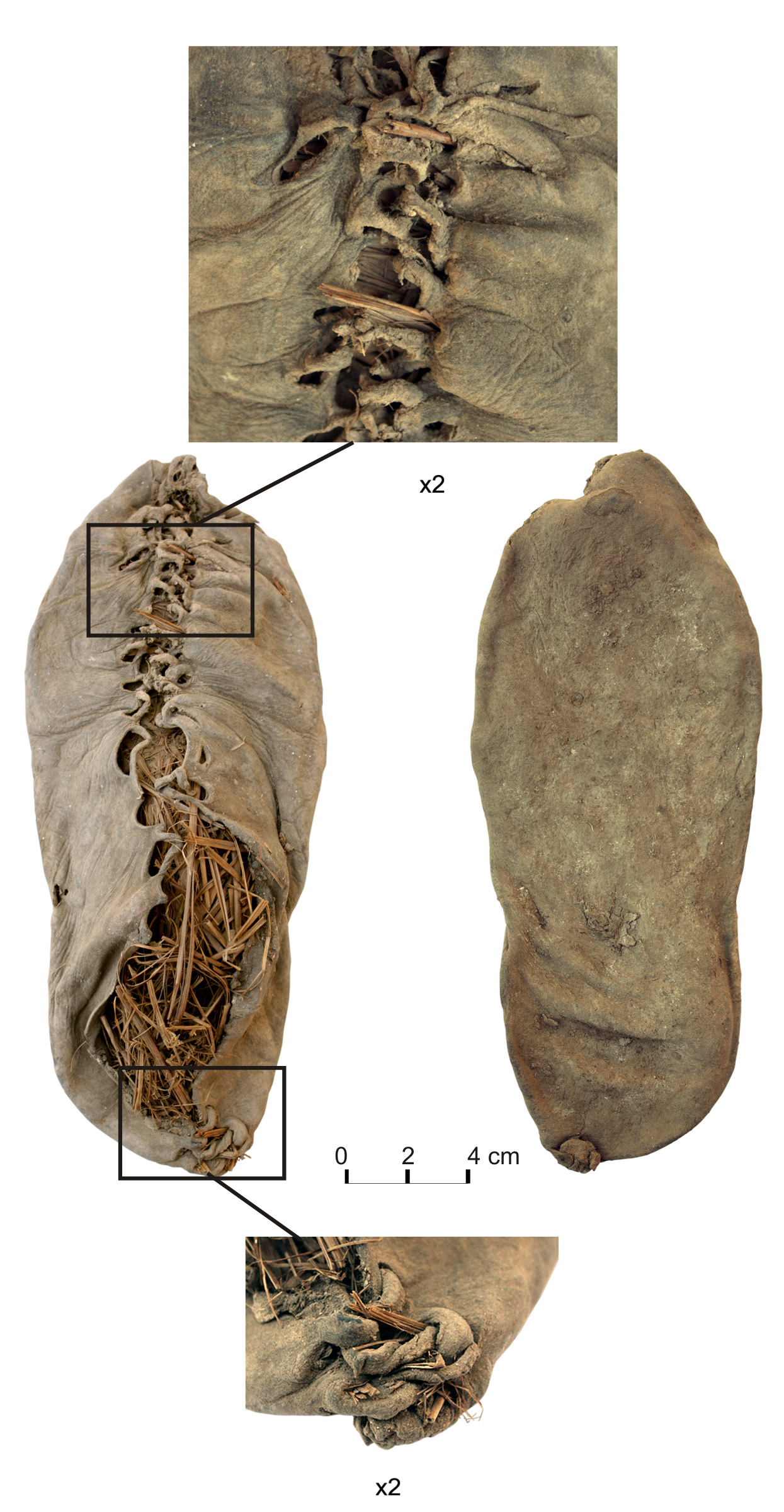
Leather Shoe 5,500 years old (Areni-1 shoe)

The leather shoe was found in Areni-1 cave, Armenia, by an international archaeologists team. The leather shoe was well preserved because of the cool and dry environment inside the cave. This shoe was initially thought only to be 600~700 years old because of its condition. It was later found out through radiocarbon dating in 2010 in Oxford, UK, and California, USA, that it was much older than researchers initially believed, with a date range of 3627–3377 Cal BC. According to Dr. Pinhasi, this oldest leather shoe people found had many similarities to shoemaking in Europe in later historical periods, suggesting that this shoe might have been worn for thousands of years.

=== Woman's skirt ===
Pavel Avetisian, the head of the Institute of Archeology and Ethnography in Yerevan and the director of the Areni-1 cave excavation, announced that they found a fragment of the skirt made of reed. This well-preserved fragment has been dated back to 3900 BC, which is about 5,900 years old. This fragment is likely the world's oldest reed clothing. This 5,900-year-old fragment from a woman's skirt is now exhibited at the History Museum of Armenia. The Areni-1 cave also has the world's oldest leather shoe with laces(refer to the previous subsection).

=== Wagons ===
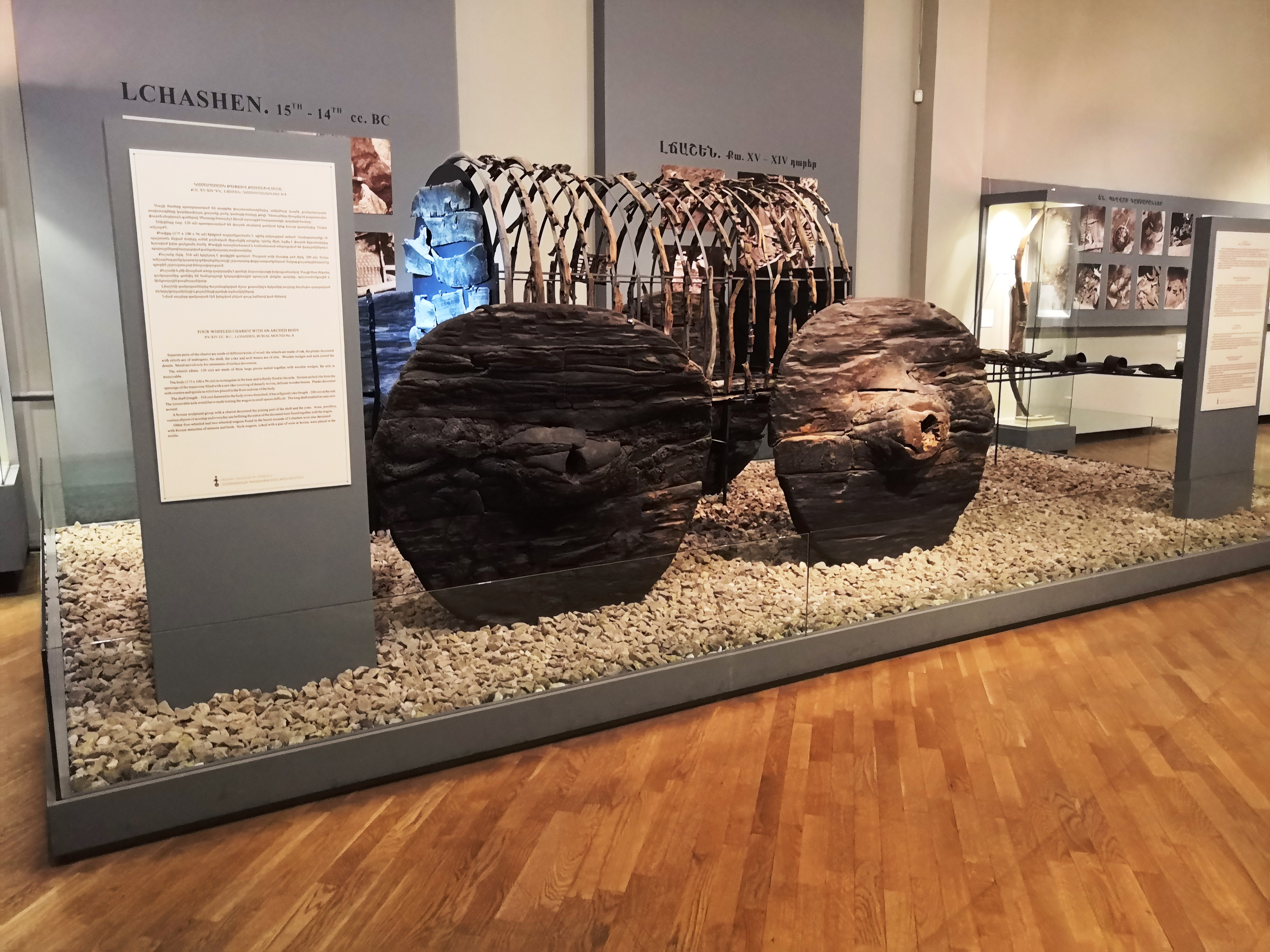
One of the wagons in the History Museum of Armenia

In Lchashen village near Lake Sevan, Armenia, researchers found artifacts of more than a dozen four and two-wheel wagons within excellent conditions. Two of which are now exhibited in the National Museum of Armenia. According to Beverley Davis in "Timeline of the Development of the Horse," these wagons were found in great conditions and are the world's oldest known wagons.

=== Earliest known winery ===
In 2007, Gregory Areshian of the University of California, Los Angeles (UCLA) and Armenian archaeologist Boris Gasparyan co-directed excavations of the Areni-1, the cave where the 5,500 years old leather shoe was found, announced that they found the world's oldest known winery, which could date back 6,100 years. In September 2010, archaeologists finished excavations of an enormous vat used for wine-producing. This large equipment also implies the large-scale wine production at the time and the grape domestication. According to Areshian, the procedure of winemaking back then was old-fashioned. People used their bare feet to stomp the grapes, store juice into jars, and place them in the cave. The dry and stable condition inside the Areni-1 cave makes it a perfect place for wine production.

=== Sky observatory (Karahunge and Metzamor) ===
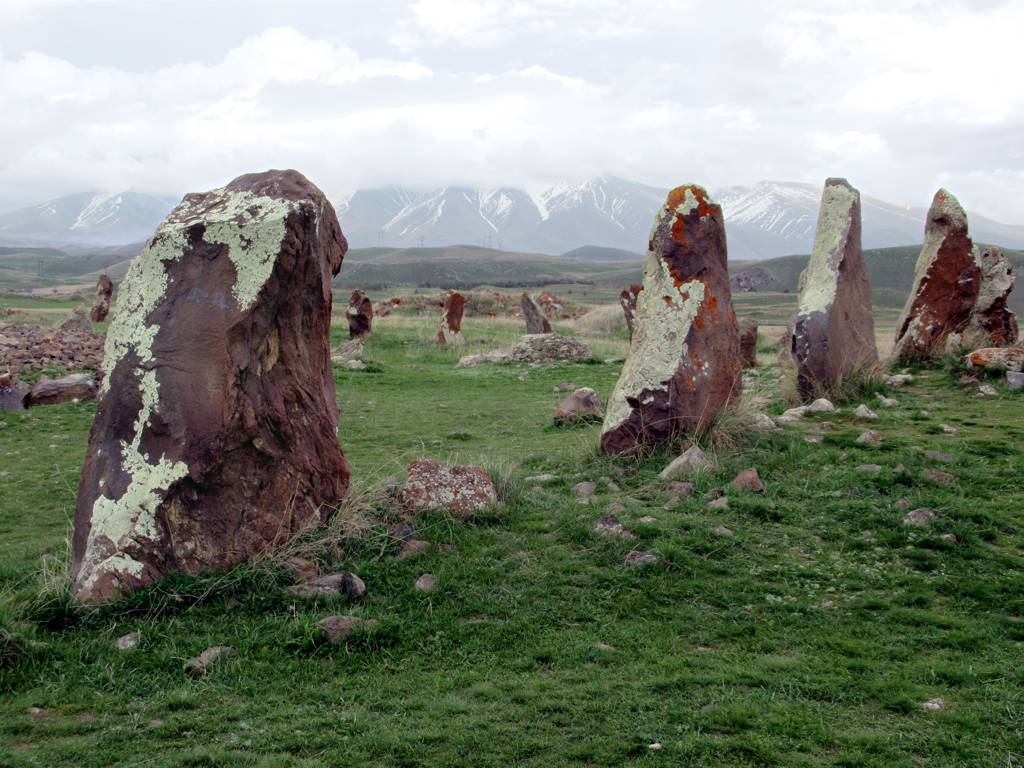
Zorats Karer (Karahunge) near Sisian in southern Armenia is considered to be a bronze age observatory from 8,000 years ago.

Karahunge is a megalithic collective stone circle dated between 7700 and 4000 years old and located 200 kilometers from the capital of Armenia, Yerevan. The observatory comprises many stones arranged in a circle with a few arms extending from it. Like many other stone-made sites, Karahunge was initially thought to be a religious-related architecture. In 1985, Prof. E.S. Parsamian firstly interpreted it as an astronomical monument. Metzamor is another ancient sky observatory in Armenia, which was also firstly interpreted as an archaeoastronomical monument by Prof. E.S. Parsamian.

=== Neolithic-era temple ===
Ergül Kodaş, the scientific counsellor to the excavations from the Archaeology Department of Mardin Artuklu University, led a team of archaeologists and discovered an 80-square-meter temple that could date back to 11,300 years ago in the Neolithic era in the Mardin district in eastern Turkey. This place has been the birthplace of many civilizations, including Armenians. During the excavations, archaeologists found four steles, and three of them were mostly intact. This ancient temple was thought to be almost the same as the temple of Portasar(Göbekli Tepe). These two temples are similar in age and the general architectural style.

=== Oldest human brain ===
The UCLA researcher Gregory Areshhian announced the finding of the oldest known human brain, which was found through the excavation of Areni-1 cave across the border between Iran and Armenia, on January 11, 2009. The dating of the brain is between 6,200 and 5,900 years ago during the copper age. Because of the dry and stable condition inside the cave, the brain was well-preserved, even with preserved blood vessels on its surface. Researchers believed the brain was from a young girl and found two other skulls next to the well-preserved brain, which were said to be from girls ages 12 to 14. The finding shows the existence of human activities back to the copper age.

=== The petroglyphs (rock engravings) of Ughtasar ===
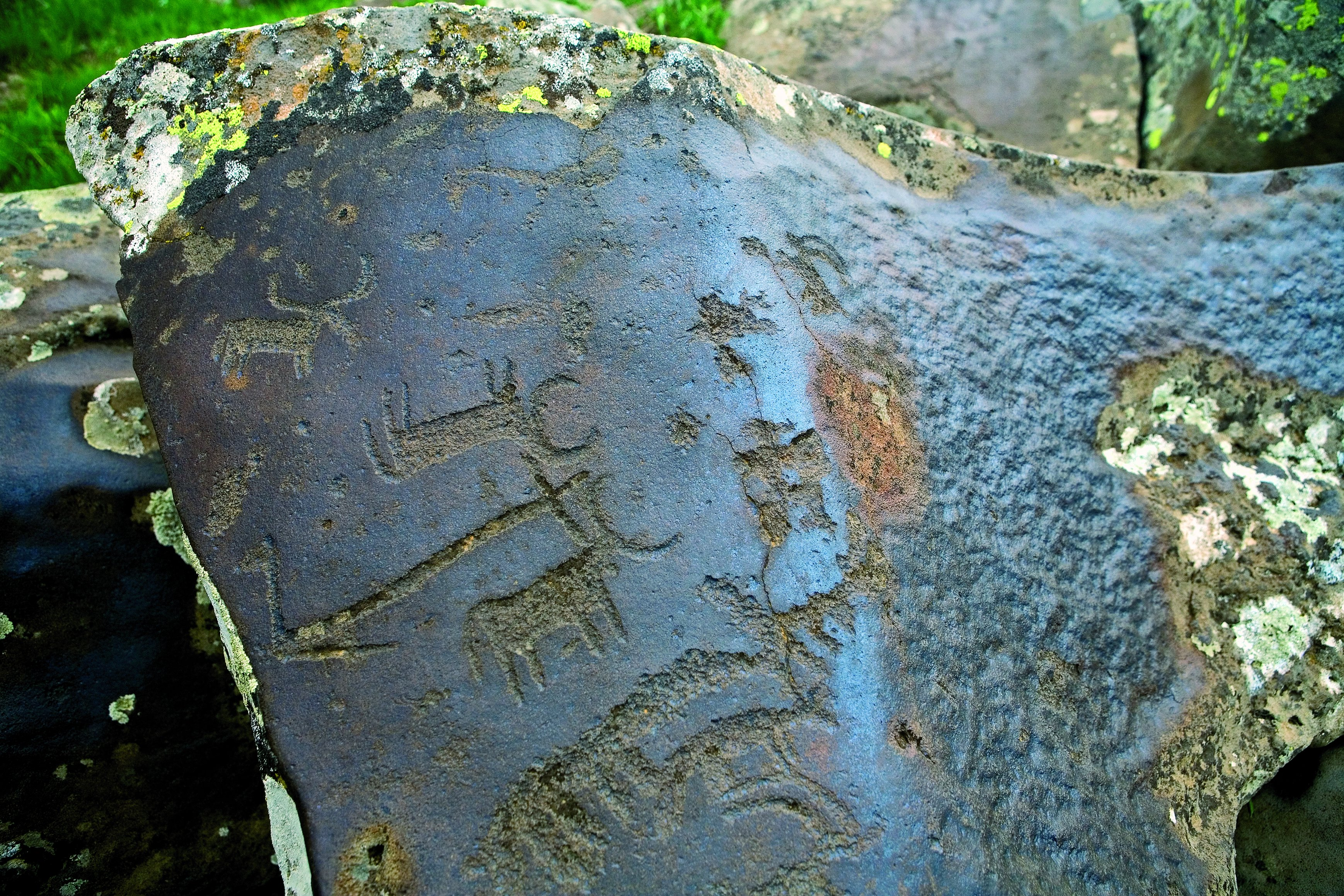
Petroglyphs in Ughtasar, showing bulls and deer

The petroglyphs (rock engravings) of Ughtasar can be found all over Yerevan. The aesthetic aspects have been applied to art crafts, including small cups and pottery. The origin of the petroglyphs of Ughtasar is at Syunik mountain in southern Armenia, all the way dating back to the Paleolithic Era (around 12,000 BCE). Dwelling people at Syunik mountain used to carve volcanic stones there. According to researcher Hamlet Martirosyan, many of the carvings were actually a writing system known as "goat writing." While other researchers believed that the name was due to a large number of goat drawings on the stones, Martirosyan said it was because the word "goat" and "writing" are homophones.

== Bronze and Iron Age (3000-1299 BC, 1200-800 BC) ==
The Bronze Age and Early Iron Age cultures have been studied extensively across the country. In the late Bronze Age and the early Iron Age (15-9 centuries BC) several powerful states emerged in the Armenian plateau. The culture is characterized by “cyclopic” castles built of massive stone blocks, which are wall surrounded settlements with surface of up to 100 hectares. Their number reached to 500 and held a culture that developed the early fertility cult, evidenced in monuments of phallic representation. Bronze sculptures of early heroes and of animals bear resemblance to Hittite sculptural art.

From 9-7 BC on the territory of Armenia was established one of the most powerful empires of the ancient world, the Urartian, or Van Kingdom, noted for its canonized architectural principles and proportional systems of separate buildings. The first cities with systematized layouts and landscape terra-forming features started to emerge (Erebuni, Teyshebaini, Tushpa, Argishtikhinili, etc). The arts of jewelry, ceramics, armory forging, stone and bronze sculpture reached utmost development.

=== Smelting foundry ===
The site is located just outside the village of Taronik. Excavation of the Metsamor, a Bronze Age archaeological site in central Armenia, uncovered a major metal industry, including a foundry with two types of blast furnaces and a huge underground storehouse used to store metals done processing and was also thought to be the granaries in winter. The foundry extracted and processed many kinds of metals such as iron and bronze.

=== Ancient female warrior ===
The group of archaeologists led by Anahit Khudaverdyan has discovered an injured woman warrior dating back to 8 to 6 century BC, the Iron Age, from Bover I site in Lori Province, Armenia. The researchers believed the woman's skeleton is of the age 20s and is likely a woman with higher social status due to the possession of jewelry in the grave. From later examination, researchers found evidence supporting the fact that she was a female warrior. The researchers found the remains of a metal arrowhead in her femur, the thigh bone. Similar situations could also be detected in other skeleton parts, such as scars and traces of blows to the pelvic bone and tibia. Besides the bone parts, the group noticed strong muscle attachments, which is most likely due to military training and constantly riding horses against aggression. After the study of this female warrior burials back in the Iron Age, researchers believed the female warriors at the time in Armenia were the Amazons depicted in ancient Greek tales.

=== Dragon-stone found on Aragats Mountain ===
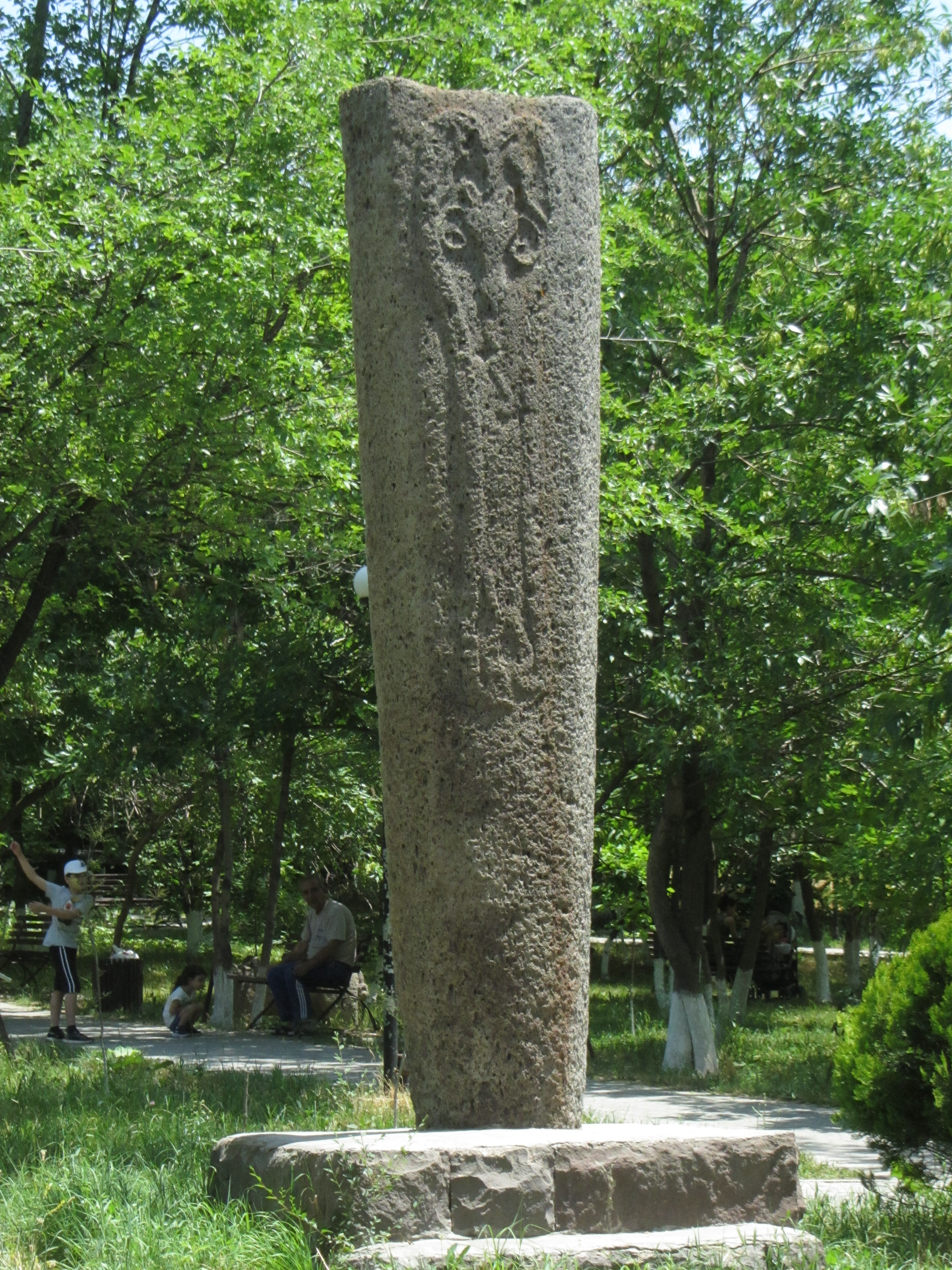
A Dragon-Stone (Vishapakar) found on Aragats Mountain

The Armenian-German-Italian expedition found a Bronze Age Dragon-stone (Vishapakar) on Aragats Mountain. Vishapakars, or dragon stones, are unique in Armenia. They are frequently carved into forms with fish heads or serpents. They depict ancient mythical animals and were usually used as markers to indicate the location of underground water supplies.

=== Karmir Blur site (Teishebaini) - 700 BC. ===
The archaeological excavation site at Karmir Blur (Teishebaini) started in 2015. During excavations at Karmir Blur, archaeologists uncovered four viceroy metal wands and various items, including weapons and jewelry. The discoveries revealed that Armenia was split into provinces, each governed by a different viceroy, and the fact that Artsakh was a part of the Armenia, United Kingdom of Van, from the 7th to 8th centuries BC as archaeologist Hakob Simonyan said.

== Preservation and restoration ==
The ideas of preservation and restoration of the Armenian historical sites started to emerge at the end of the 19th and the beginning of the 20th centuries. Nowadays these ideas are applied in Armenia along with the excavations. However, ways of approach might not always be the best suit. Generally speaking, the preservation and restoration of those sites should adhere to three main ideas. (1) Firstly, before any kind of preservation and restoration, interdisciplinary cooperation should be taken, letting people doing different jobs who participate in the same work discuss to make the best decision considering different aspects. (2) Secondly, when trying to reinforce or restore the sites, people should come up with something which causes the least interference. (3) Thirdly, for sites about to be excavated, people should firstly guarantee the preservation of the sites; for sites that were already excavated, people should apply protective techniques like adding protective layers to preserve the remains.

Positive examples of reinforcement of already excavated archaeological sites in Armenia include the ruins of Zvartnots, the ancient settlement of Shengavit, the palace of Garni, and the ruins of dwelling houses in Teishebaini.

== Engagement of non-experts ==
=== Project APSAP (Ararat Plain Southeast Archaeological Project) ===
APSAP (Ararat Plain Southeast Archaeological Project) is a research collaboration between Hong Kong University and the Institute of Archaeology and Ethnography of the Republic of Armenia's National Academy of Sciences that focuses on understanding the human activities of Ararat Plain. The project is directed by Dr. Peter J. Cobb, an assistant professor at Hong Kong University, in collaboration with scholars and researchers from Armenian institutes. Students from Hong Kong University and other institutions went to Ararat Plain to collaborate with Armenian archaeologists on-site and to gain an insight into archaeology in Armenia.

=== Project ArAGATS (Archaeological Research in Armenia) ===
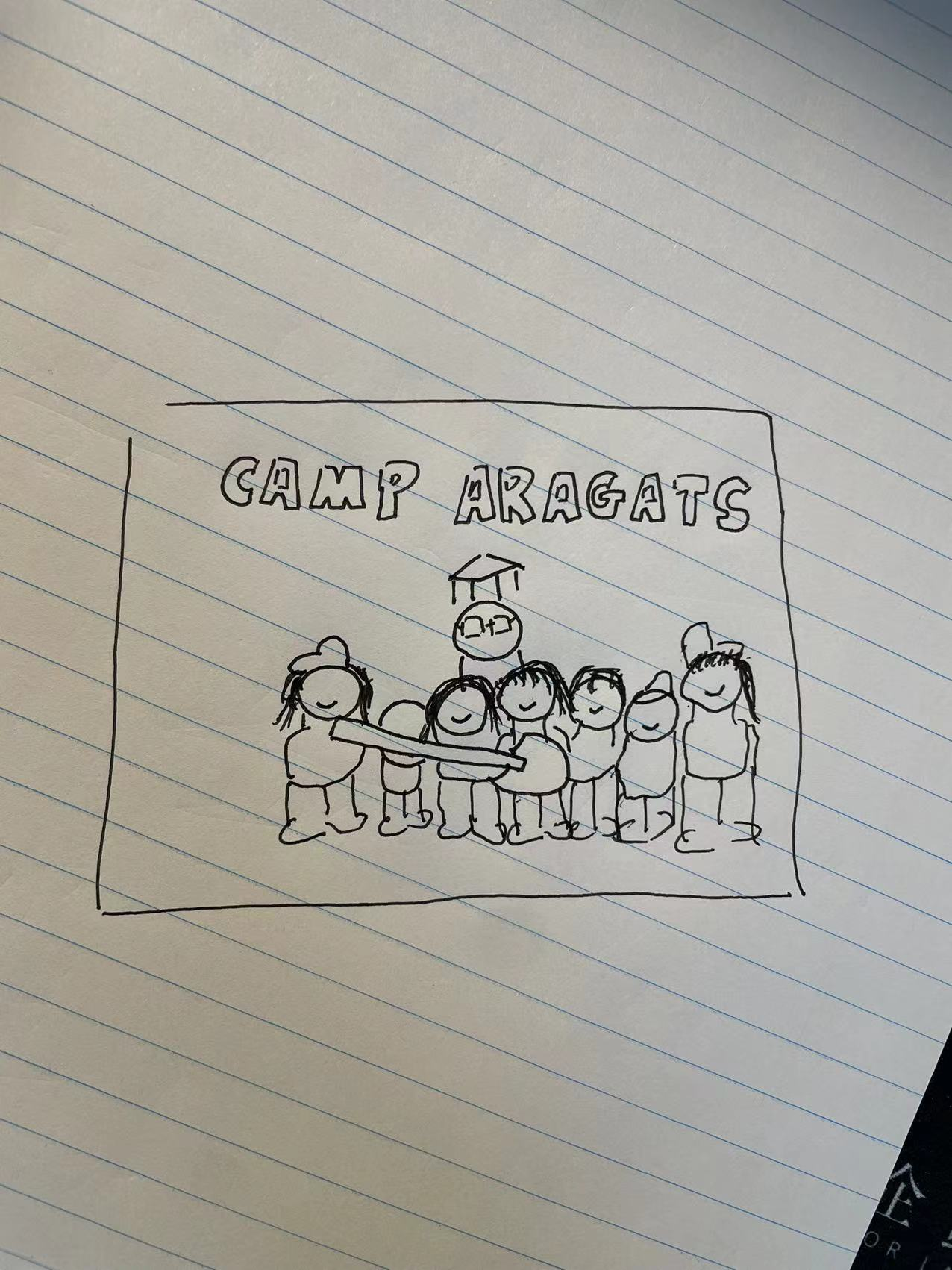
Camp Aragats illustration

Project ArAGATS (Archaeological Research in Armenia) was founded in 1998 by Dr. Adam T. Smith from the Department of Anthropology, Cornell University, and Dr. Ruben S. Badalyan from the Institute of Archaeology and Ethnography, Republic of Armenia. Despite studies conducted by researchers, Project ArAGATS's also dedicated to training a new generation of archaeologists on how to analyze, present the results of archaeological work, and preserve the region's archaeological sites. Project ArAGATS provides children in rural areas chances to experience and engage in archaeology through learning the history of their region and hands-on work such as excavating. In 2017 and 2018, ArAGATS held archaeological camps for girls in towns or villages near the sites in Armenia, to work in fields and learn from those professionals in the archaeological field.

== See also ==
- Areni-1 shoe
- Adam T. Smith
- Gregory Areshian
