= Areni (grape) =

Armenian red wine grape variety

- Grape (Vitis)
- Color of berry skin: Noir (black-skinned)
- Species: Vitis vinifera
- Also called: Areni Noir, Sev Areni (Black Areni), Areni Kakhaghen, Areny
- Origin: Vayots Dzor Province, Armenia
- Notable regions: Vayots Dzor, Ararat Valley, Aragatsotn, Tavush
- Hazards: Susceptible to downy mildew
- VIVC number: 576

Areni (Armenian: Արենի), also known as Areni Noir or Sev Areni ("Black Areni"), is a red wine grape variety indigenous to Armenia. It is named after the village of Areni in Vayots Dzor Province, near which the world's oldest known winery was discovered in 2007 in the Areni-1 cave complex. It is Armenia's most widely planted and most important red grape variety.

Areni is grown mainly in the high-altitude volcanic-soil vineyards of Vayots Dzor, with smaller plantings in the Ararat Valley, Aragatsotn, and Tavush, and limited cultivation across the border in Azerbaijan. It is a mid-to-late ripening variety, naturally resistant to frost, drought, and disease. Wines made from Areni range from full-bodied dry reds to semi-sweet styles and brandy, and are typically pale-to-medium ruby, with fine, silky tannins, medium-to-high acidity, and aromas of red cherry, pomegranate, violet, and peppery spice.

Genetic analysis has found no close relationship between Areni and other known grape varieties, which researchers cite as support for its status as a distinct autochthonous cultivar.

== History ==
=== Ancient origins ===
Armenia is among the oldest wine-producing regions in the world, with archaeological and genetic evidence pointing to viticulture in the South Caucasus dating back several thousand years. Areni itself is estimated to have been cultivated in Armenia for over six thousand years. Until a renaming in 1947, the variety was known as Sev Malahi.

The key evidence comes from the Areni-1 cave complex, about one kilometre east of Areni village on the southern bank of the Arpa River. Excavations begun in 2007 by a joint Armenian-American team — including Boris Gasparyan, Ron Pinhasi, and Gregory Areshian of the UCLA Cotsen Institute of Archaeology — uncovered what researchers have identified as the world's oldest known winery. Radiocarbon dating placed the winery's operation at approximately 4,100–4,000 BCE, around 1,000 years older than what had been thought the oldest winery (found in the West Bank in 1963). Excavators recorded a pressing basin about one metre long, fermentation vats, storage jars, and drinking cups, along with desiccated grapevine stems, seeds, and pressed grape skins. Chemical analysis of vessel residues identified malvidin, a red wine pigment, supporting the winery interpretation.

A 2015 multidisciplinary study combining genetic, ampelographic, and archaeological data concluded that the grape variety associated with the ancient remains corresponds to the cultivar still grown today in the Vankapatkan vineyards of Vayots Dzor. Further evidence of early Armenian viticulture comes from the Karmir Blur site near Yerevan, dated to around 650 BCE, where grape seeds and clay amphorae were found.

=== Medieval period to Soviet era ===
Wine production remained tied to Armenian religious and cultural life through the medieval period, often connected to the Armenian Apostolic Church (Christian since 301 CE). Monastic communities cultivated vineyards, including Areni, near monasteries such as Noravank and Tatev. Some vines in Vayots Dzor are documented at over 120 years old, grown on their original, pre-phylloxera roots, reflecting the region's largely phylloxera-free status.

The Armenian Genocide of 1915 and incorporation into the Soviet Union in 1922 disrupted traditional winemaking. Soviet planning favoured brandy (notably Armenian brandy) and bulk wine over quality production, and many traditional practices declined, including techniques tied to the clay vessels known as karas.

=== Modern revival ===
After Armenian independence in 1991, winemakers began rehabilitating neglected vineyards and returning to indigenous varieties, particularly Areni. International attention increased after the Areni-1 cave findings were widely reported in 2011.

Two diaspora Armenians are widely credited with helping establish export-oriented production: Zorik Gharibian, who founded Zorah Wines in 2001 (first vintage 2011), and Eduardo Eurnekian, who founded Karas Wines in 2010. Zorah's Karasi Areni Noir was included in a 2012 Bloomberg list of notable world wines.

In 2013, Vahe Keushguerian founded Keush, which produced Armenia's first traditional-method sparkling wine from indigenous grapes, with Areni as the main component. The same year, the Karapetyan family founded Hin Areni winery near the Areni-1 cave, since grown into one of the larger wine tourism estates in Vayots Dzor.

Since 2009, the village of Areni has hosted the annual Areni Wine Festival on the first Saturday of October, drawing tens of thousands of visitors and winemakers from across Armenia to taste and showcase regional wines, with the event held near the Areni-1 cave site. The festival has grown over the years to include competitions, folk music and dance, and tastings of more than 100 wines from Armenian producers.

== Viticulture ==
=== Growing regions ===
- Vayots Dzor – The primary appellation for Areni. Vineyards typically sit between 1,200 and 1,600 metres, with some reaching up to 1,800 metres, on volcanic and clay-limestone soils. The continental climate — cold winters, warm dry summers, large diurnal swings — supports slow, even ripening and acid retention.
- Ararat Valley – At roughly 800 metres elevation; Armenia's second most important wine region. Warmer temperatures tend to produce riper, fuller-bodied wines.
- Aragatsotn – On the slopes of Mount Aragats, at roughly 1,100–1,400 metres; produces both red and white wines.
- Tavush – A newer, somewhat more temperate growing area; Areni from here tends to be lighter and more floral than Vayots Dzor examples.

Outside Armenia, Areni is also cultivated in the Nakhchivan Autonomous Republic of Azerbaijan, where it is grown under the synonym Malayi, including at the Shahbuz Sharab Winery; it has limited additional plantings in Iran, Georgia, and parts of Turkey.

=== Climate, soil, and vine characteristics ===
Vayots Dzor has cold winters and warm, dry summers, with annual precipitation generally in the range of 200–600 mm. Soils in the main growing areas are predominantly volcanic with good drainage; some southern areas also have limestone and clay. Most vineyards remain ungrafted, since the region has so far avoided major phylloxera infestation, allowing some old vines (120+ years) to survive.

Areni is a mid-budding, mid-to-late ripening, vigorous vine producing medium-sized, moderately compact bunches of small, thick-skinned, dark blue-black berries. It is susceptible to downy mildew (Plasmopara viticola) and, to a lesser degree, powdery mildew (Erysiphe necator); it otherwise shows good resistance to winter frosts. Areni has also been used as a parent in grape breeding; it is documented as a parent of the cross variety Tigrani.

In France, Areni was added to the national Catalogue of vine varieties in 2023 (Category A), though it has not been classified for commercial wine production there.

=== Genetics ===
Genetic analysis using nuclear microsatellite (nSSR) markers found no close relationship between Areni and other known Eurasian grape varieties, supporting its classification as a distinct autochthonous cultivar. A 2021 study by Margaryan et al. examined the genetic diversity of Armenian grapevine germplasm, identifying several first-degree relationships among autochthonous varieties and clarifying some synonyms and homonyms.

A 2026 ampelographic and genetic survey identified 34 distinct clones of Sev Areni across vineyards in Vayots Dzor, all sharing matching genetic (nSSR) profiles despite unexpectedly high phenotypic variability; the clones were sampled from vines estimated to be up to 200 years old. The same survey noted that several related named varieties documented in Armenian ampelographies — including Nosr Areni, Eghegnadzori № 4 (also called Areni Berqatu), Mormor, and Kapuyt Mskhali — are genetically and phenotypically distinct from Sev Areni proper.

Research by Hovhannisyan, Dallakyan, Yesayan, and colleagues concluded that the true-to-type Areni — termed Sev (Black) Areni in their study — corresponds to the biotype grown in the old Vankapatkan vineyards and preserved in the national ampelographic collection (accession N42). The related Seyrak Areni (accession 70) was found to be genetically distinct and not a synonym. Other ampelographic sources, including Galet (2000), have separately suggested that the white-berried Areni Spitak may be a distinct variety rather than a colour mutation of Areni, though this has not been conclusively settled by DNA analysis.

== Winemaking ==
Areni is used for styles ranging from light, unoaked, fruit-forward reds to structured wines aged in oak or in traditional clay vessels called karas (comparable to the Georgian qvevri), as well as traditional-method sparkling wine, semi-sweet table wines, and brandy.

- Stainless steel or concrete: Preserves fresh fruit aromas, acidity, and floral character; generally produces wines for earlier drinking.
- Oak-aged: Adds vanilla, spice, and smoke notes; associated with greater structure and ageing potential.
- Karas (clay vessel): A revived traditional method now associated with higher-end Armenian winemaking. Zorah's Karasi Areni Noir, fermented and aged in clay, is among the better-known examples. The method is generally described as producing a softer texture and more earthy or mineral character.
- Sparkling wine: Keush produces traditional-method sparkling Areni, drawing on the variety's acidity to support extended lees ageing.

=== Food pairing ===
Areni's acidity and moderate tannins are often noted as making it versatile at the table. Common Armenian pairings include khorovats (barbecue, typically lamb or beef), dolma, herb-based stews, and aged cheeses such as Chanakh. Internationally, suggested pairings include duck with cherry or berry sauce, roasted lamb, mushroom dishes, and hard cheeses; some critics compare its profile to Pinot Noir or Sangiovese as a reference point.

== Wine characteristics ==
Areni wines are typically pale-to-medium ruby or garnet, often more transparent in appearance than international reds of similar body. Common tasting notes include red cherry, pomegranate, blackberry, cassis, violet, and dried rose petal, with herbal, peppery, and earthy notes more pronounced in barrel- or karas-aged examples. The palate is generally medium-to-full bodied, with silky tannins, medium-to-high acidity, and a long finish sometimes described as having a slightly bitter edge. Most entry-level Areni is intended for consumption within two to four years of vintage; oak- or karas-aged reserve wines are reported by some critics to develop further over five to fifteen years.

== Notable producers ==
- Hin Areni (Areni, Vayots Dzor) – Founded 2013 by the Karapetyan family near the Areni-1 cave; produces Areni Noir and Voskehat under labels including 6100, Ancestors, and Crossroads.
- Karas Wines (Aragatsotn) – Founded 2010 by Eduardo Eurnekian; produces both Areni-based and international-variety wines.
- Keush (Vayots Dzor) – Founded 2013 by Vahe Keushguerian; produced Armenia's first traditional-method sparkling wines from indigenous grapes.
- Old Bridge Winery (Vayots Dzor) – A family-run estate near Areni village associated with low-intervention, organic-leaning viticulture.
- Trinity Canyon Vineyards (Aghavnadzor, Vayots Dzor) – Founded 2009; among Armenia's first certified organic wine producers. Produces Areni Noir and Voskehat alongside international varieties, using both karas and modern methods.
- Van Ardi (Ararat Valley) – Run by Varuzhan Mouradian; produces Areni Noir and other indigenous varieties with a focus on the Ararat Valley terroir.
- Voskevaz Winery (Voskevaz, Aragatsotn) – Founded in 1932; the oldest continuously associated winery name in Armenia, producing Areni Noir alongside other indigenous varieties.
- Zorah Wines (Rind, Vayots Dzor) – Founded in 2001 by Zorik Gharibian; released its first commercial vintage in 2011. Its Karasi Areni Noir was included in a 2012 Bloomberg list of notable world wines.

== Synonyms ==
- Areni Chernyi
- Areni Noir
- Malai Sev
- Malayi (Nakhchivan Autonomous Republic, Azerbaijan)
- Sev Areni (Սև Արենի) – "Black Areni"
- Sev Malahi – historical name used until 1947
- Areni Kakhaghen
- Areny
- Urza Sev

Areni is genetically distinct from Seyrak Areni (accession 70), per the 2015 Hovhannisyan et al. study, though VIVC passport data lists Seyrak Areni among Areni's recorded synonyms, reflecting some disagreement in the literature. The relationship between Areni and the white-berried Areni Spitak (White Areni) also remains unresolved: some ampelographers consider it a distinct variety, while others have proposed it may be a colour mutation of Areni, a question DNA profiling has not yet definitively settled.

== See also ==
- Armenian wine
- Areni-1 winery
- List of grape varieties
