= Armenians in China =

Chinese people of Armenian descent

Total population
- 1000

Regions with significant populations
- Hong Kong

Languages
- Armenian, Chinese

Religion
- Armenian Apostolic Church

There are roughly 1,000 Armenians currently living in Mainland China and Hong Kong.

The Armenian community of Hong Kong and Mainland China, commonly referred to as ChinaHay, regularly organizes events across China.

Whilst the current community is relatively small, Armenians have held a historical presence in China for many centuries.

== History ==
=== Armenian merchants in China ===
Armenian merchants traveled and lived in China long before the twentieth century. Hethum I, ruler of Cilicia, traveled to the Mongol court in Karakorum in 1254. Alans and Armenians were in China during the Yuan dynasty, converted to Catholicism at the turn of the 14th century by John of Montecorvino. In Quanzhou a church belonging to the Franciscans received a donation from an Armenian woman in Medieval China. In 1318, Quanzhou's bishop, Peregrine of Castello, reported that an Armenian woman gave the Franciscans a church and house. Armenians followed the Franciscan Catholic Latin Rite in Quanzhou.

From the 17th to 19th centuries, some Armenian merchants established communities and ran successful businesses in Guangzhou and Hong Kong and there was even a small Armenian community in Tibet. The Armenians of Tibet were focused on trade in deer musk.

=== During two World Wars ===
During World War I, Armenians who fled from the Ottoman Empire to escape massive genocide led by Turkish troops against Armenian civilians, were officially accepted in China. China agreed to allow them to stay and provided accommodation, food and churches. After the Turkish surrender, most Armenians chose to remain in China, due to the continuing crisis in the Caucasus.

In World War II, the Armenians joined the Chinese and Koreans, and later, the Americans and British forces, against Japanese invasion. Most Armenians followed Chiang Kai-shek's Nationalist Revolutionary Army, or joined the Eighth Route Army of the Communists, and resisted Japanese forces in Shanghai, Beiping, and other Chinese provinces. The Armenians lost a total of 5,000 men.

=== Cultural Revolution ===
Since all religions were targeted by the Cultural Revolution, many churches and houses were destroyed, and most Armenians fled to Soviet Union's Central Asia or India. The massive cultural revolution had decreased the number of Armenians in China to less than 1000.

== Harbin ==
A limited number of Armenians settled in Manchuria during the construction of the Chinese Eastern Railway (KVZHD), undertaken by Imperial Russia in 1898. Their main settlement was in Harbin.

After the Russo-Japanese War, the number of Armenians increased, which necessitated the creation of an Armenian National Organization for the purpose of helping their needy countrymen and the preservation of their national heritage.

The Armenian National Organization was headed by the Board of Directors, whose president for many years was Dr. C. G. Migdisov, along with Mr. Ter-Ovakimov, an engineer with the KVZHD and Nr. Melik-Ogandjanov, an attorney.

The Armenian National Organization was founded in 1917. Its statute was approved by the local authorities in 1919. By 1923, they succeeded in building their own church and adjacent to it a social hall located on Sadovaya Street. Because most of the members of the Armenian colony lived in Harbin and had the only Armenian church in China, with residential quarters for their priest, Fr. Yeghishe Rostomiants, the spiritual leader of all Armenians in Manchuria, China and Japan, Harbin became the center of Armenians in China.

One of the main tasks of the Armenian Organization was to solve the problems of assistance to the needy members, such as the elderly, the poor, the orphans and generally all those who needed one or another kind of help in co-operation with the Ladies Aid Group. The Board organized social events and staged national and literary plays, which were performed by the youth group in Armenian. On national and religious holidays, tea parties were also organized. Classes to study the Armenian language and literature were also held. The theatrical plays were performed at the prestigious Commercial Club and the Tchurin Club, where “Anahit” drama and Azerbaijani opera “Arshin-Mal-Alan“ musicals were performed, featuring the lead singer, Karine Psakian.

Until 1918, the city of Harbin had an Armenian House of Prayer in the district of Noviy Gored. In 1918, the KVZHD (Chinese Eastern Railroad) granted the Armenian Colony a piece of property on 18, Sadovaya Street, on the corner of Liaoyang Street, where they began to build the Far-Eastern Armeno-Gregorian Church, which took several years to complete. The name “Far-Eastern” is derived from the fact that Rev. Fr. Yeghishe Rostomiants and his family emigrated to Harbin from Vladivostok, where evidently his church had closed. The church in Harbin began officially to function in the 1920s. In 1925, the Chinese Authorities registered it as the Armeno-Grigorian Church of Harbin. The church was erected in memory of St. Gregory the Illuminator.

In 1932, Fr. Yeghishe Rostomiants died, leaving the church without a pastor and for several years thereafter, the church and the premises were rented to the members of the Lutheran Congregation, who later built their own church. In 1937, thanks to the initiative and efforts of Mr. Ter-Ovakimov, President of the Armenian Organization, a priest was brought from Jerusalem - Rev. Fr. Assoghig Ghazarian. He had been educated in the monastery after he was orphaned during the Armenian genocide. At the time of his arrival in Harbin, he was only 27 years old. He was well-educated and spoke five languages. The Armenian Colony, numbering at the time about 350-400 people, felt very fortunate once again to have a pastor.

During the period of 1938–1950, under Rev. Fr. Ghazarian, a building adjacent to the church was enlarged and renovated, thanks to the financial backing of large contributors and businessmen. In 1950, Rt. Rev. Fr. Assoghig Ghazarian, who during World War II ended up in the concentration camp for British and American citizens in the city of Mukden, returned to Jerusalem and the Armenian Church once again was without a pastor.

Subsequently, during the following years, due to the mass exodus of Armenians from Harbin, their colony dwindled to a mere 40-50 people. In 1959, the building of the Armenian Church changed hands and became the property of the Chinese Government, which in turn used it for a textile factory. In August 1966, during the Cultural Revolution, all churches in Harbin were demolished and all the treasures of the Armenian Church, including icons and elaborate vestments were destroyed.

== Shanghai ==
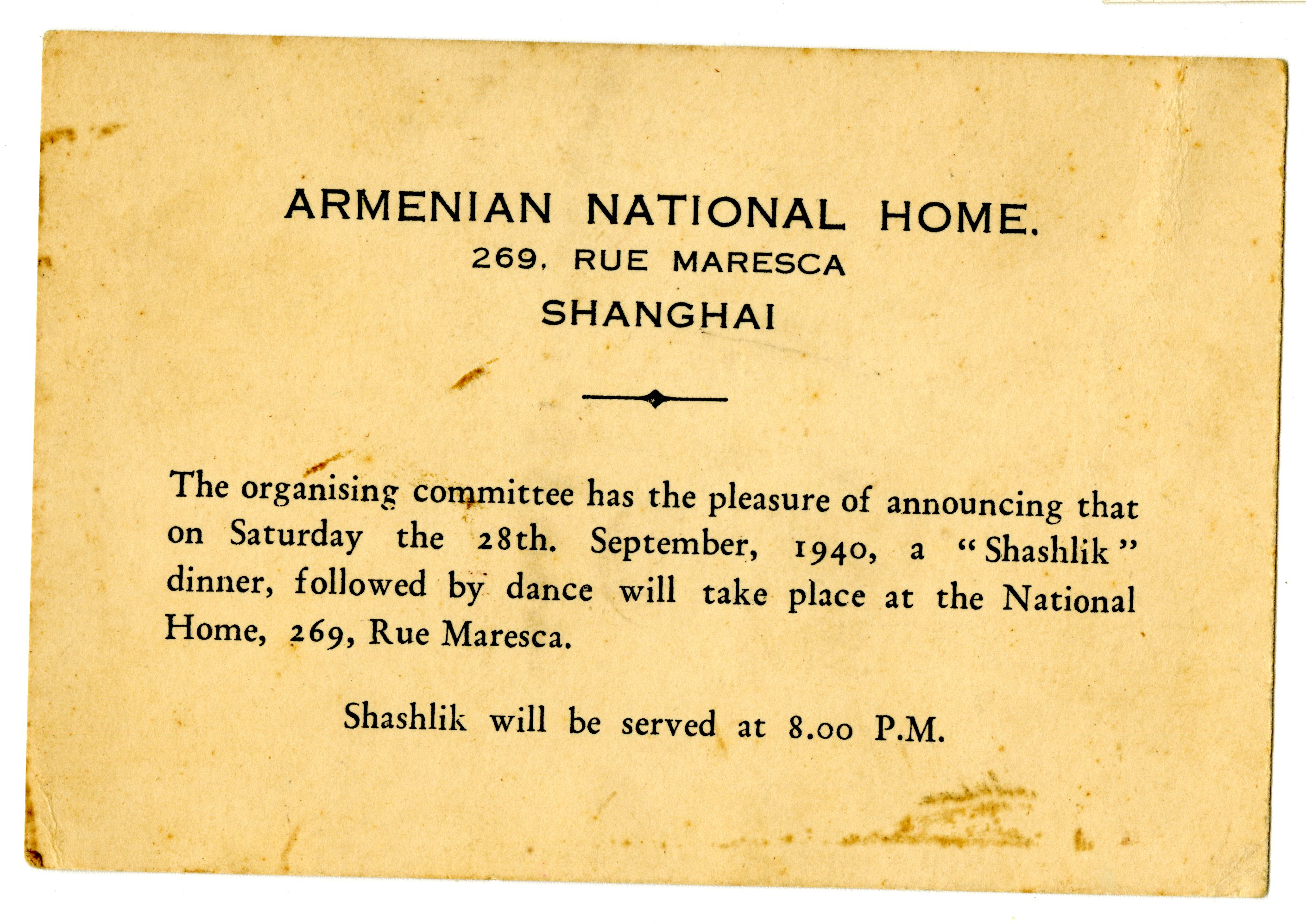
An invitation to the Armenian National Home. 1940.

There is also much Armenian history in Shanghai. The Armenian Relief Society had a chapter in Shanghai as early as 1920.

It was the houses that were initially set out by the Armenian Relief Society that eventually became the Armenian Club of Shanghai. Its purpose was twofold: first, it helped refugees get settled in their new surroundings, but it then served as a meeting place for like-minded people to gather and swap stories.

Following the Communist takeover in 1949, most of the Armenians left China (mainly for San Francisco) and the community ended up being only 50 strong. There is today an active chapter in Shanghai of the Armenian community of China.

== Hong Kong ==
There has been an Armenian community of various sizes in Hong Kong since the 19th century and many notable Armenians have left their mark, including Sir Paul Catchik Chater. For most of the second half of the 20th century, Hong Kong was a natural trading hub for many Armenians from all around the world and a small community was always present.

In November 2013, the community opened the Jack & Julie Maxian Hong Kong Armenian Centre with more than 100 distinguished attendees including Karekin II present for the opening ceremony. The community regularly organizes events at the centre.

== Famous Armenians in China ==
- Sir Paul Catchik Chater was born to Armenian parents in India in 1846. Orphaned at the age of eight, Chater received his education in Calcutta before arriving in Hong Kong in 1864. He became one of the most successful businessmen in the history of Hong Kong and is regarded for founding Hong Kong Land in 1889, which remains one of the largest and most prestigious companies of Hong Kong. In 1896, Chater was appointed to the Executive Council of Hong Kong and served there until he died in 1926. He was knighted in 1902. In 1904, he single-handedly financed the construction of St. Andrew's Church in Kowloon, which is still in use and bears a plaque to his honor. Chater Road, Catchik Street and the office building Chater House are named after him. A commemorative plaque that mentions his Armenian past can be found in Chater House.
- Professor Hovhannes Ghazarian, an Armenian born and educated in Macau, was first to translate the Bible into Chinese, in 1822. Ghazarian (also known as Johannes Lassar), translated the Gospel of St. Matthew in 1807. Later on, he travelled to Serampore (in current West Bengal, India) to continue working on the Bible. The New Testament was published in 1813, and the whole Bible was issued in 1822 by the British and Foreign Bible Society. These editions are now recognized as the first known complete print versions in Chinese.

== Armenian community of China today ==
There is a very active Armenian community in China today, commonly referred to as ChinaHay, composed of Armenians from all around the world. There are currently around 500 individuals living mainly across the cities of Beijing, Shanghai, Nanjing, Guangzhou, Shenzhen and Hong Kong.

The community achieved important milestones in recent years with its formal incorporation, electing its first executive committee headed by President Henri Arslanian and with the opening of the Jack and Julie Maxian Hong Kong Armenian Centre in Hong Kong in November 2013. The community celebrated the first Armenian Mass in mainland China in decades, launched a fellowship with the Calouste Gulbenkian Foundation to research old Armenian history in China, participated in the 1st Pan-Asian Armenian Gathering as well as offered Armenian classes across China and Asia in collaboration with the Armenian Virtual College. On 2016, Mher Sahakyan was elected as a president of the Armenian Community of China.

== See also ==
- Armenia–China relations
- Andin. Armenian Journey Chronicles
- Armenian diaspora
- Immigration to China

== Sources ==
- Thomas Lahusen, Harbin and Manchuria: Place, Space, and Identity, November 15, 2001, ISBN 0-8223-6475-1.
- Arra Avakian, Armenia: A Journey Through History, January 2, 2000, ISBN 0-916919-20-X.
- Ruben Giney, Andin. Historical studies on the Armenians in China, July, 2016, ISBN 978-9939-51-897-8.
