= Areni-1 winery =

Archaeological site in Armenia

Coordinates: 39.731335°N 45.203626°E

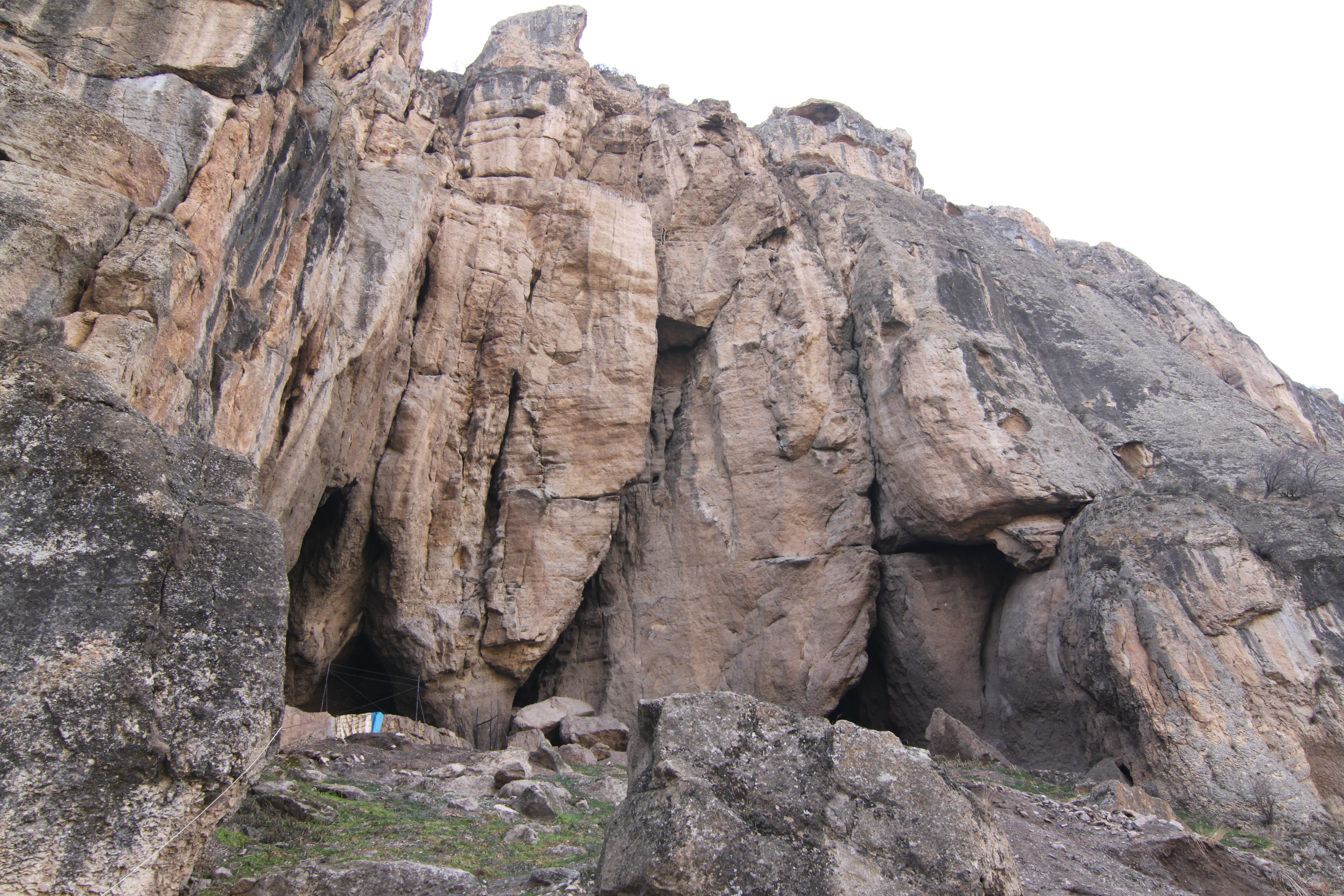
Entrance to the Areni-1 cave

The Areni-1 winery is the world's oldest known winery, discovered in 2007 in the Areni-1 cave complex near the village of Areni in Vayots Dzor Province, Armenia. Excavated by a team of Armenian and international archaeologists, the winery dates to approximately 4100–4000 BC during the Late Chalcolithic period, making it at least 1,000 years older than the winery unearthed in the West Bank in 1963, previously the oldest known. The winery's discovery provides critical insights into early viticulture, horticulture, and social complexity in the Near East.

The excavations were led by Boris Gasparyan of the Institute of Archaeology and Ethnography, National Academy of Sciences of Armenia, and co-directed by Ron Pinhasi (initially at University College Cork, Ireland, later University College Dublin) and Gregory Areshian of the University of California, Los Angeles (UCLA) Cotsen Institute of Archaeology. Initial funding came from the Gfoeller Foundation and University College Cork, with UCLA and the National Geographic Society joining as sponsors in 2008. Excavations were completed in 2010.

In 2008, the Areni-1 shoe, the world's oldest known leather shoe (circa 3600–3500 BC), was also found in the same cave, highlighting the site’s exceptional preservation.

== Discovery ==
Excavations at the Areni-1 site, located in a three-chambered karstic cave along the Arpa River, began in 2007 and concluded in September 2010. The cave's stable microclimate, with minimal temperature fluctuations and low humidity, preserved organic remains exceptionally well. Archaeologists unearthed a well-preserved winery in the cave's first gallery, including a 60-centimetre-deep (2-foot) fermentation vat, a one-metre-long (3 ft 3 in) clay basin wine press coated with malvidin (a red wine pigment), large storage jars (karases), pottery sherds, and organic remains such as grape seeds, pressed grape skins, desiccated vines, prunes, and walnuts.

The winery's proximity to burial sites, including pots containing human skulls (one with preserved brain tissue), suggests its use in funerary or sacrificial rituals. Drinking cups found near these graves further support the site's ritual significance. The cave was abandoned after a roof collapse, and organic materials were preserved by a layer of sheep dung, which inhibited fungal growth.

== Analysis ==
Biochemical analysis, published in the Journal of Archaeological Science in 2011, confirmed wine production through the detection of malvidin and other residues in the vat and storage jars. Botanical and genetic analyses identified the grape remains as domesticated Vitis vinifera, indicating advanced viticulture. Radiocarbon dating by researchers at the University of California, Irvine and Oxford University placed the winery between 4100 and 4000 BC, aligning with the Late Chalcolithic period.

The winemaking process involved pressing grapes by foot in the clay basin, with juice draining into the 60-centimetre-deep (2-foot) vat (capacity ~14–15 gallons or 65 liters) for fermentation, followed by storage in clay jars. Some researchers suggest tree resin may have been added to preserve the wine, potentially resembling Greek retsina.

The winery's sophistication reflects advanced horticultural knowledge, including grape domestication, vineyard management, and fermentation techniques. According to Gregory Areshian, the discovery illuminates early agricultural innovation and social complexity in the Near East. Patrick E. McGovern, a biomolecular archaeologist at the University of Pennsylvania Museum, noted that the large-scale wine production implies prior grape domestication, positioning the Caucasus as a cradle of viticulture. Genetic studies suggest Vitis vinifera evolved in the Caucasus and Near East, reinforcing Areni-1's significance.

The winery's builders are not definitively identified but may be linked to the Kura–Araxes culture, known for regional trade networks. The site's ritual context and technological advancements suggest a society with complex social and economic structures.

== Significance ==
The Areni-1 winery underscores Armenia's ancient winemaking tradition, which continues in Vayots Dzor with indigenous grape varieties like Areni and Voskehat. The cave, a UNESCO-recognized site, is a tourist attraction, often visited alongside modern wineries and the nearby Noravank Monastery. The annual Areni Wine Festival, launched in 2009, celebrates this heritage.

The discovery has reshaped understandings of early viticulture, highlighting the Armenian Highlands and Caucasus as a key region for grape domestication and winemaking innovation. Ongoing research, including DNA analysis of grape remains, aims to further clarify the winery’s role in prehistoric communities.

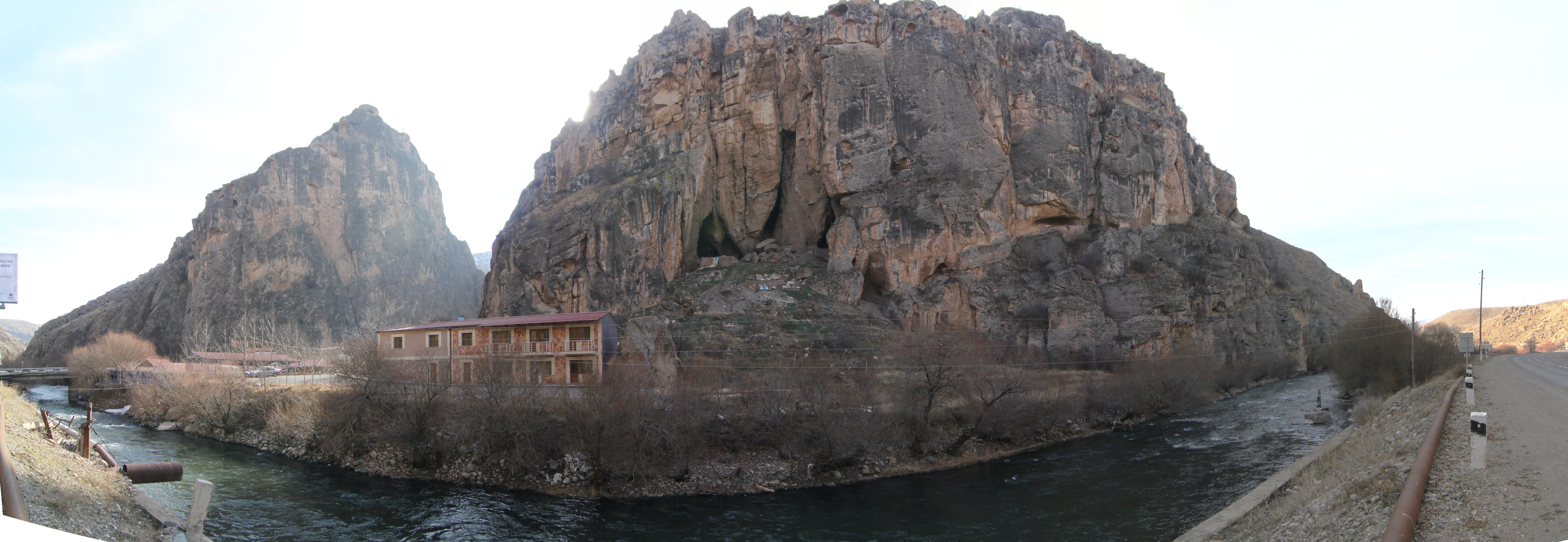
Panorama of the Areni-1 site along the Arpa River

== See also ==
- Gregory Areshian
- Areni-1 shoe
- History of wine
- Armenian wine
- Andin. Armenian Journey Chronicles

== Bibliography ==
- Areshian, G., Gasparyan, B., Avetisyan, P., Pinhasi, R., Wilkinson, K., Smith, A., Hovsepyan, R., & Zardaryan, D. (2012). “The Chalcolithic of the Near East and Southeastern Europe: Discoveries and New Perspectives from the Cave Complex Areni-1, Armenia.” Antiquity, 86(331), 115–130.
- Barnard, H., Dooley, A.N., Areshian, G., Gasparyan, B., & Faull, K.F. (2011). “Chemical Evidence for Wine Production Around 4000 BCE in the Late Chalcolithic Near Eastern Highlands.” Journal of Archaeological Science, 38(5), 977–984. doi:10.1016/j.jas.2010.11.012
- Pinhasi, R., Gasparian, B., Areshian, G., Zardaryan, D., Smith, A., Bar-Oz, G., & Higham, T. (2010). “First Direct Evidence of Chalcolithic Footwear from the Near Eastern Highlands.” PLoS ONE, 5(6), e10984. doi:10.1371/journal.pone.0010984
