= Yervant Zorian =

American electrical engineer

Yervant Zorian is a Syrian-born American electrical engineer known for contributions to design for test (DFT) and logic built-in self-test (BIST) for complex integrated circuits. He is Chief Architect and Fellow at Synopsys and President of Synopsys Armenia, and the founding president of the Armenian Virtual College of the Armenian General Benevolent Union (AGBU). Zorian was named an IEEE Fellow in 1999 "for contributions to built-in self-test of complex devices and systems," and later received the IEEE Circuits and Systems Society Industrial Pioneer Award (2005) and the IEEE Hans Karlsson Standard Award (2006) for leadership of the IEEE 1500 embedded-core test standard.

== Education and career ==
Zorian received an M.S. in computer engineering from the University of Southern California, a Ph.D. in electrical engineering from McGill University, and an M.B.A. from the Wharton School of the University of Pennsylvania. He is chief architect and fellow at Synopsys and president of Synopsys Armenia; previous roles include vice president and chief scientist at Virage Logic, chief technologist at LogicVision, and distinguished member of technical staff at Bell Labs.

== Professional service ==
Zorian founded and chaired the IEEE 1500 Standardization Working Group and has served as President of the IEEE Test Technology Technical Council (TTTC). He was General Chair of the 50th Design Automation Conference (2013–2014 cycle) and of the 50th International Test Conference (2019). Within AGBU, he is a Central Board member and the founding president of the Armenian Virtual College (AVC).

== Awards and distinctions ==
Zorian is a recipient of numerous awards.

- 2000 recipient of the IEEE Distinguished Services Award for outstanding leadership of TTTC including general chair, activities group chair, and editor-in-chief for Design and Test Magazine
- 2005 recipient of the IEEE Circuits and Systems Society Industrial Pioneer Award for his contributions to design for test technology through Built-In Self-Test solutions and design tools that dramatically boosted the quality and reliability of digital systems and the efficiency of design and test engineers
- 2006 recipient of the IEEE Hans Karlsson Standards Award for outstanding leadership, communications, and achievement with the IEEE Testability Method for Embedded Core-based ICs standard (IEEE Std. 1500tm-2005)
- IEEE Meritorious Award
- 2013 recipient of the Republic of Armenia's National Medal of Science for his research on “Test Solutions for Nanoscale Systems-on-Chip: Algorithms, Methods and Test Infrastructure”
