= Adam T. Smith =

- Title: Distinguished Professor of Arts and Sciences in Anthropology

Academic background
- Education: Brown University; Cambridge University; University of Arizona

Academic work
- Institutions: University of Chicago; Cornell University

Adam Thomas Smith is a Distinguished Professor of Arts and Sciences in Anthropology at Cornell University. He is also the co-founder (with Ruben Badalyan) of the American-Armenian Project for the Archaeology and Geography of Ancient Transcaucasian Societies (Project ArAGATS) and co-director (with Lori Khatchadourian) of The Aragats Foundation. He is a co-director (with Lori Khatchadourian and Ian Lindsay) of Caucasus Heritage Watch, a research group monitoring cultural heritage in the South Caucasus in the wake of the 2020 Nagorno-Karabakh war. In 2021, Smith and Khatchadourian joined with Gerard Aching to launch a community excavation program at the St. James AME Zion Church in Ithaca, New York, the oldest active AME Zion church in the world.

Smith received an A.B. from Brown University in 1990, an M.Phil. from Cambridge University in 1991. An M.A. and Ph.D. from the University of Arizona in 1993 and 1996, respectively. He was then a member of the University of Michigan's Society of Fellows from 1997 to 2000 before joining the Department of Anthropology at the University of Chicago. In the fall of 2011, Smith joined the Cornell University's Department of Anthropology faculty, serving as department chairperson from 2014 to 2017.

Smith's research is dedicated to the archaeology and anthropology of the South Caucasus, particularly the area of modern Armenia, where most of his work has been focused. His work investigates "the role that the material world-everyday objects, representational media, natural and built landscapes-plays in our political lives".

Smith is a winner of a 2010 Guggenheim Fellowship.

== Books ==
- The Political Machine: Assembling Sovereignty in the Bronze Age Caucasus, The Rostovtzeff Lectures, Princeton University Press (published 2015), 7 July 2015, ISBN 9780691163239
- The Archaeology of Power and Politics in Eurasia Regimes and Revolutions, Cambridge University Press (published 2012), 19 November 2012, ISBN 9781107016521
- The Archaeology and Geography of Ancient Transcaucasian Societies, Volume 1, Oriental Institute Publications, University of Chicago Press, 2009, ISBN 978-1-885923-62-2
- Social Orders and Social Landscapes, Cambridge Scholars Publishing (published 2008), 2007, ISBN 9781847183590 (with Laura M. Popova and Charles W. Hartley)
- Beyond the Steppe and the Sown, Colloquia Pontica, Brill Publishers, 2006, ISBN 978-90-04-14610-5 (with David L. Peterson and Laura M. Popova)
- The Political Landscape Constellations of Authority in Early Complex Polities, University of California Press (published 2003), 7 October 2003, ISBN 9780520237506
- Archaeology in the Borderlands: Investigations in Caucasia and Beyond, Monographs 47, UCLA Cotsen Institute of Archaeology (published 2004), 2003, ISBN 978-1-931745-01-7
