= Malvidin =

Names
- IUPAC name 3,4′,5,7-Tetrahydroxy-3′,5′-dimethoxyflavylium
- Systematic IUPAC name 3,5,7-Trihydroxy-2-(4-hydroxy-3,5-dimethoxy)-1λ^{4}-benzopyran-1-ylium

Identifiers
| CAS Number | 643-84-5 |
| 3D model (JSmol) | Interactive image |
| ChEBI | CHEBI:6674 |
| ChEMBL | ChEMBL255753; ChEMBL592005 |
| ChemSpider | 140095 |
| KEGG | C08716 |
| PubChem CID | 159287 |
| UNII | GL5KGZ4D8U |
| CompTox Dashboard (EPA) | DTXSID30146622 |
- InChI: InChI=1S/C17H14O7/c1-22-14-3-8(4-15(23-2)16(14)21)17-12(20)7-10-11(19)5-9(18)6-13(10)24-17/h3-7H,1-2H3,(H3-,18,19,20,21)/p+1 Key: KZMACGJDUUWFCH-UHFFFAOYSA-O; InChI=1/C17H14O7/c1-22-14-3-8(4-15(23-2)16(14)21)17-12(20)7-10-11(19)5-9(18)6-13(10)24-17/h3-7H,1-2H3,(H3-,18,19,20,21)/p+1 Key: KZMACGJDUUWFCH-IKLDFBCSAG
- SMILES: Oc1cc2c(O)cc(O)cc2[o+]c1c3cc(OC)c(O)c(OC)c3

Properties
| Chemical formula | C_{17}H_{15}O_{7}+ |
| Molar mass | 331.2968 g/mol |
- Except where otherwise noted, data are given for materials in their standard state (at 25 °C [77 °F], 100 kPa). verify (what is ?) Infobox references

Malvidin is an O-methylated anthocyanidin, the 3',5'-methoxy derivative of delphinidin. As a primary plant pigment, its glycosides are highly abundant in nature.

== Natural occurrences ==
Malvidin is responsible for the blue color found in petals of the Primula plants of the polyanthus group. Blue flowers of the blue pimpernel (Anagallis monelli) have also a higher concentration of malvidin.

It is responsible primarily for the color of red wine, Vitis vinifera being one of its sources. It is also present in other berries, such as blueberries (Vaccinium corymbosum) or the saskatoon berries (Amelanchier alnifolia).

== Chemistry ==
Slightly acidic and neutral solutions of malvidin are characteristically of a red color, while basic solutions of malvidin yield a blue color.

The breakdown of malvidin releases syringic acid.

== Use as a marker in archaeology ==
The breakdown of malvidin releases syringic acid as revealed in the examination of jars containing shedeh, a drink of Ancient Egypt. Malvidin is also present in the site of the Areni-1 winery, a 6,100-year-old winery discovered in 2007 in the Areni-1 cave complex in the village of Areni in the Vayots Dzor province of Armenia.

== Glycosides ==
- Malvin is a malvidin diglucoside.
- Oenin is the malvidin-3-glucoside.
- Primulin is the 3-O-galactoside of malvidin.
- Malvidin 3-rutinoside is a pigment responsible for bract color in Curcuma alismatifolia (the Siam tulip). Acylated malvidin 3-rutinosides are responsible for the violet color of Petunia integrifolia subsp. inflata.
- Malvidin-3-O-glucoside-5-O-(6-acetylglucoside) is a pigment responsible for the blue color in 'Johnson's Blue' and other 'blue' geraniums

== See also ==
- List of phytochemicals in food
- List of antioxidants in food
