= Qışlaqabbas =

- Municipality
- Location within Azerbaijan
- Coordinates: 39°29′26″N 45°00′08″E
- Country: Azerbaijan
- Autonomous republic: Nakhchivan
- District: Sharur

Population (2005)
  - Total: 1,825
- Time zone: UTC+4 (AZT)

Qışlaqabbas (also known as Gyshlagabbas, Gyshlag Abbas, and Gyshlag-Abbas) is a village and municipality in the Sharur District of Nakhchivan, Azerbaijan. It is located on the bank of the Arpachay River, 10 km south of the district center. It was merged with the İbadulla village, recently separated from it. They share common administrative building. Its population is mainly busy with farming. There are a secondary school, a cultural house, a medical center and an ancient settlement of Şortəpə in the village. The municipality has a population of 1,825.

== Etymology ==
The name of the village was made out from the words of qışlaq (the wintering) and Abbas (person's name) means "the wintering of Abbas".

== Historical and archaeological monuments ==
=== Şortəpə Necropolis ===
Şortəpə (Shortapa) Necropolis - the archaeological monument of the Bronze Age (2nd millennium of BC) in the east from the Qıslaqabbas village, near of the same named settlement of the Sharur region. Its area is 3 hectares. From stone box graves which were destroyed during farm works were discovered rich material and cultural monuments. The findings consist from a red jug made from clay, little pot, bowl, plates of kettle type. Polychrome painted plates were represented with a jug.
