= Gregory Areshian =

Armenian politician (1949–2020)

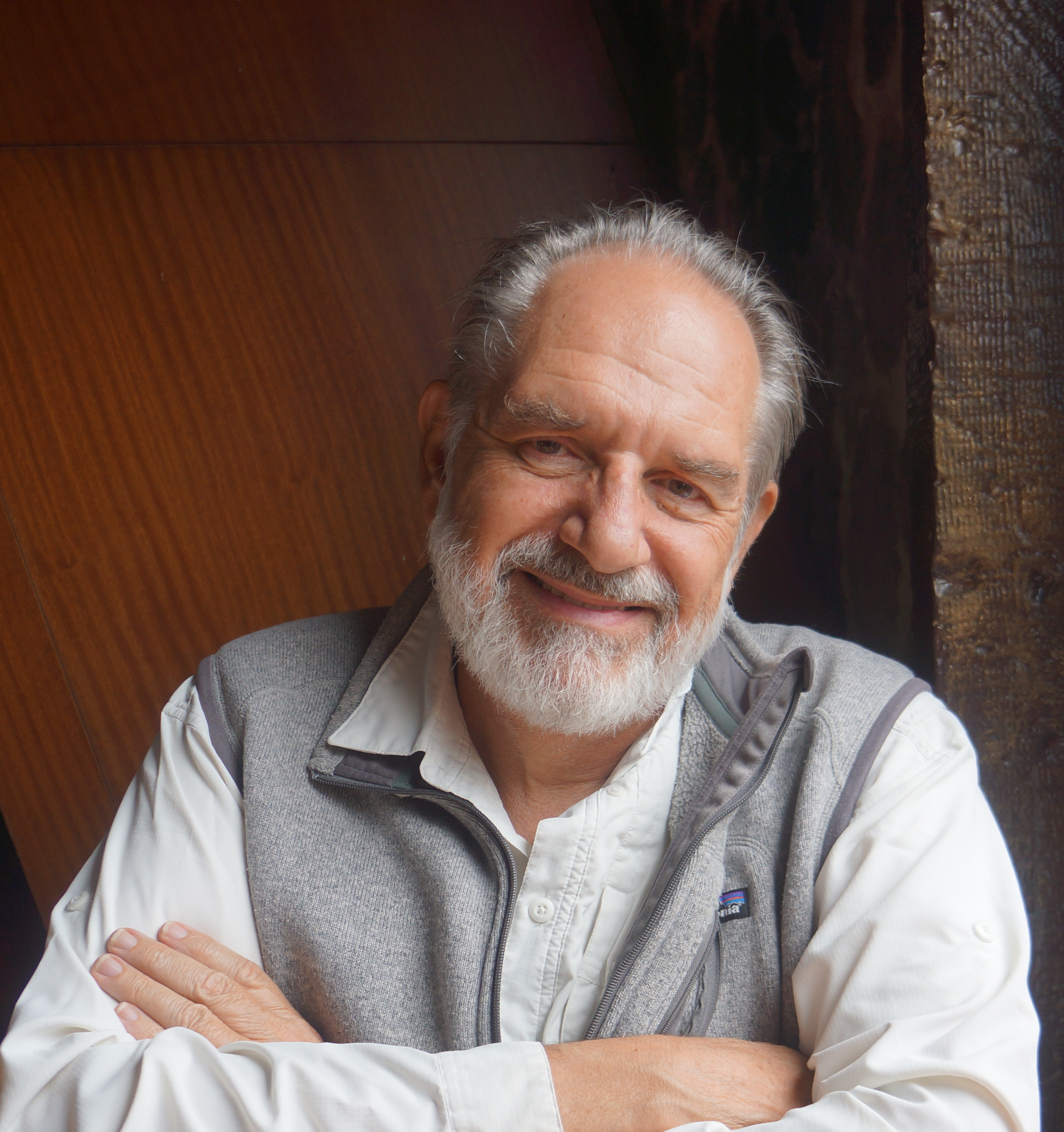
- Born: 13 May 1949; Yerevan, Armenian SSR
- Died: 2 August 2020 (aged 71); Yerevan, Armenia
- Education: Yerevan State University (BA), Yerevan State University (MA), Saint Petersburg State University (PhD)
- Scientific career
- Workplaces: National Academy of Sciences of Armenia; American University of Armenia; University of California, Los Angeles
- Thesis: Iron in Ancient Western Asia (1975)
- Doctoral advisor: Boris Piotrovsky

Gregory Areshian (13 May 1949 – 2 August 2020) was an Armenian-American archeologist and historian who was a professor at American University of Armenia. He was the co-director of the international team of archeologists who, led by Boris Gasparyan, found the 5,500 years old shoe in and the oldest winery in Areni of which Areshian said:

For the first time, we have a complete archaeological picture of wine production dating back 6,100 years.

Areshian taught at 14 U.S. universities and colleges including; the University of California, Los Angeles, University of California, Irvine, University of Chicago, University of Wisconsin, Platteville, and Amherst College. He is the author of more than 150 scholarly works published in 5 languages in 12 countries, mostly devoted to interdisciplinary studies in social sciences and the humanities with a special focus on the Middle East and Armenia in a broader historical context.

== Early life ==
Gregory Areshian was born on 13 May in 1949 in Yerevan. He had a keen interest in history and archaeology since he was only five years old. He read a number of books on the history of warfare including Julius Caesar's Commentarii de Bello Gallico in French.

== Education ==
Areshian received his bachelor's and master's degree from Yerevan State University where he studied from 1966 to 1973. From 1973 until 1975 Areshian pursued his PhD studies at the Saint Petersburg State University under the supervision of Boris Piotrovsky. His thesis was "Iron in Ancient Western Asia".

Areshian knew 9 languages; English, Russian, Armenian, German, French, Latin, Turkish, Grabar and Urartian cuneiform.

== Festschrift ==
In 2017 a Festschrift was published in honor of Areshian under the title Bridging Times and Spaces: Papers in Ancient Near Eastern, Mediterranean and Armenian Studies. The editors of the volume were Pavel Avetisyan, a former student of Areshian and Yervand Grekyan.

== Views ==
Areshian saw himself as an Edwardian liberal, who believed in freedom of speech, but under one condition, that the person who exercises his freedom of speech is informed about the subject that one talks about. He also thought that freedom of speech should be preceded by freedom of thought. Areshian had an eclectic approach in both his historical as well as archeological works.

== Death ==
Areshian died on 2 August 2020, from complications related to COVID-19 in Astghik Medical Center. He had been diagnosed with COVID-19 three weeks earlier.

== Bibliography ==
=== Books ===
- 2013 Empires and Diversity: On the Crossroads of Archaeology, History, and Anthropology. Ideas, Debates, and Perspectives, 7, Los Angeles: Cotsen Institute of Archaeology Press, University of California, 256 pages + ill (Editor and contributing author).
- 1996 Haykakan čartarapetutyan patmut’yun, Hator A (History of Armenian Architecture, Vol. I: The Architecture of Armenian Highlands from the Earliest Times to the 3rd Century AD). Co-authored with K.K. Ghafadaryan, K. L. Hovhannisian, and A.A. Sahinian, Yerevan: HH GAA “Gitut’yun” Hratarakchut’yun (“Gitut’yun” Press of the Armenian National Academy of Sciences), Pp. 298 + pl. 48.
- 1993 Hnagitakan ashkhatank'nerǝ Hayastani norakaŕuytsnerum,1986-1987 t't' peghumneri ardyunk'nerǝ (Archaeological Investigations of Construction Development Sites in Armenia, Excavations Reports for 1986–87), Vol. 1. Co-edited with G.A. Tiratsian and A.A. Kalantarian, Yerevan: Publishing House of the Armenian Academy of Sciences, Pp. 171+ pl. 190.
- 1992 Editor of Hayastani hnagitut'yun, h. 1: K'ari Dar - Ush Bronzi Dar (Archaeology of Armenia, vol. 1: From the Stone Age through the Late Bronze Age), by S.A. Yesayan, Yerevan: Yerevan University Press.
- 1990 Mezhdistsiplinarnye issledovanija kul’turogeneza i etnogeneza Armjanskogo nagor’ja i sopredel’nykh oblastej, Sbornik dokladov (Interdisciplinary Studies of Cultural and Ethnic Processes in the Armenian Highland and Adjacent Regions, A Collection of Papers). Co-edited with S.A. Yesayan, Yerevan: Izdatel’stvo Erevanskogo Universiteta (Yerevan University Press), Pp. 294.

=== Articles ===
- "Further Thoughts on the Uruk Expansion", Current Anthropology, Vol. 31, No. 4 (Apr., 1990), pp. 396–399

=== Book and conference reviews ===
- 2014 Archaeology and Multidisciplinarity in a Regional and Ethnic Context: An International Conference at the Cotsen Institute. Backdirt 2014, Annual Review of the Cotsen Institute of Archaeology at UCLA, 112–113.
- 2009 Review of Rouben Galichian, The Invention of History: Azerbaijan, Armenia and the Showcasing of Imagination. London: Gomidas Institute, 2009; Yerevan: Printinfo Art Books, 2009, pp. 119, Journal of the Society for Armenian Studies, Vol. 18, No. 2:136-138.
- 2007 Review of A. Y. Petrosyan, The Indo-European and Ancient Near Eastern Sources of the Armenian Epic: Myth and History (Journal of Indo-European Studies, Monograph No. 42, Washington D.C.: Institute for the Study of Man), Indo-European Studies Bulletin (UCLA), Vol.12, No. 1: 8-12.
- 2006 Review of Adam T. Smith and Karen S. Rubinson (editors), Archaeology in the Borderlands: Investigations in Caucasia and Beyond (Cotsen Institute of Archaeology Monograph Series 47), American Journal of Archaeology 110(3): 513 – 514.
- 2003 Discovering Eurasian Opportunities. Review of the 2002 University of Chicago Conference on Eurasian Archaeology, Backdirt, Newsletter (from 2006 – The Annual Review) of the Cotsen Institute of Archaeology at UCLA, Fall 2002/Winter 2003, p. 8.
- 1988 Soveshchanie v Otdelenii Istorii Akademii nauk SSSR (A Conference at the Division of History of the Academy of Sciences of the USSR). With L. Abrahamyan, Haykakan SSH GA Lraber hasarakakan gitut’yunneri (The Journal of Social Sciences of the Academy of Sciences of Armenia), no. 6: 93 – 96.
- 1987 Chetvertyj mezhdunarodnyj simpozium po armjanskomu iskusstvu, Sektsija “Iskusstvo drevnej Armenii. Narodnoe i prikladnoe iskusstvo” (The Fourth International Symposium on Armenian Art, Sessions devoted to Ancient, Folk, and Applied Arts). Sovetskoe iskusstvoznanie (Soviet Studies in Arts), vol. 22, Moscow: “Sovetskij khudozhnik” Press, 440 – 443.
- 1986 Mijazgayin konferans nvirvac hin Aŕajavor Asiayi patmut’yan, hnagitut’yan, lezvabanut’yan ev banasirut’yan hartserin (International Conference on the History, Archaeology, Linguistics, and Philology of Ancient Western Asia, Charles University, Prague). Patma-banasirakan Handes (Journal of History and Philology), no. 4: 240 – 242.
- 1977 Gitakan nstashrjan nvirvac Haykakan SSH-um 1975 – 1976 t’.t’. dashtayin hnagitakan hetazotut’yunneri ardyunk’nerin (Conference Devoted to the Results of Archaeological Fieldwork in Armenia, 1975 – 1976). Patma-banasirakan Handes (Journal of History and Philology), no. 3: 261 – 264.

== See also ==
- Areni-1 shoe
- Areni-1 winery
