= Areni-1 cave =

Cave and archaeological site in Armenia

- Geographical range: South Caucasus, Armenian Highlands
- Period: Chalcolithic, Bronze Age
- Dates: ca. 4,300 — 3,500 B.C.E.
- Major sites: Areni

Areni-1 cave
- Արենիի քարանձավ (Armenian)
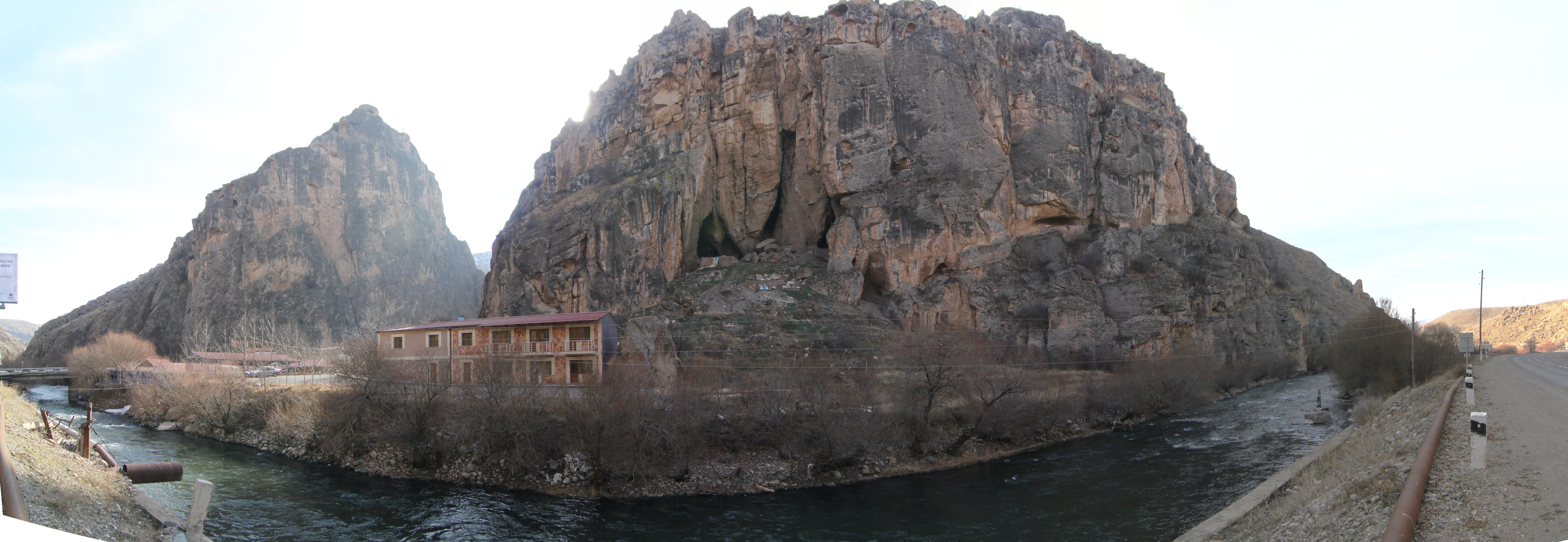
- Panorama of the site along the Arpa River

- Location within Armenia
- 39°43′53″N 45°12′13″E
- Location: Vayots Dzor Province, Armenia
- Region: Armenian Highlands

Site notes
- Material: Karst
- Length: 40 m (130 ft)

The Areni-1 cave complex (Armenian: Արենիի քարանձավ) is an ancient multicomponent site, and late Chalcolithic/Early Bronze Age ritual site and settlement, located near the Areni village in southern Armenia along the Arpa River.

== Findings ==
In 2008, Armenian PhD student and archeologist Diana Zardaryan of the country's Institute of Archaeology discovered the earliest known shoe in the world at the site. In January 2011, the earliest known winery in the world was uncovered in the cave. Later, in September 2011, the discovery of a straw skirt dating to 3,900 years BCE was reported. In 2009, the oldest humanoid brain was discovered in the cave. Recent archaeological investigations demonstrate that

The Late Chalcolithic (ca. 4,300–3,500 Cal BC) is represented by the "Areni" and "Godedzor" traditions, with such sites as Areni-1 cave and the settlements of Teghut and Nerkin Godedzor. Society is characterized by a diversity of cultural complexes, growing complexity, relations to the Syro-Mesopotamian (Late Ubaid, Uruk) and North Caucasian (Early Maikop) worlds, as well as extractive copper metallurgy. The Late Chalcolithic traditions in Armenia (Areni-1, Teghut, Nerkin Godedzor) ... share common characteristics and regional contacts to Maikop and Ubaid-Uruk. These societies are on the way towards growing complexity, a process reflected in the appearance of developed copper based metallurgy (molds, slags, ingots, kilns, pure and arsenic copper), new metal weapons/tools (knife/daggers, spearheads, flat axes), ceramics (potter's wheel, pottery signs), exotic and prestigious objects of gold, silver, and lapis-lazuli, stamp seals and status symbols (scepters), kurgans and jar burials, and rudiments of monumental architecture (cf. the "temple" of Berikldeebi). This is all accompanied by the blossoming of long distance trade, essential transfer of knowledge, and the development of centralized hierarchies.

== Genetics ==
Three individuals who lived in the Chalcolithic era (c. 5700–6250 years BP), found in the Areni-1 ("Bird's Eye") cave, were identified as belonging to haplogroup L1a. One individual's genome indicated that he had red hair and blue eyes.

== Gallery ==
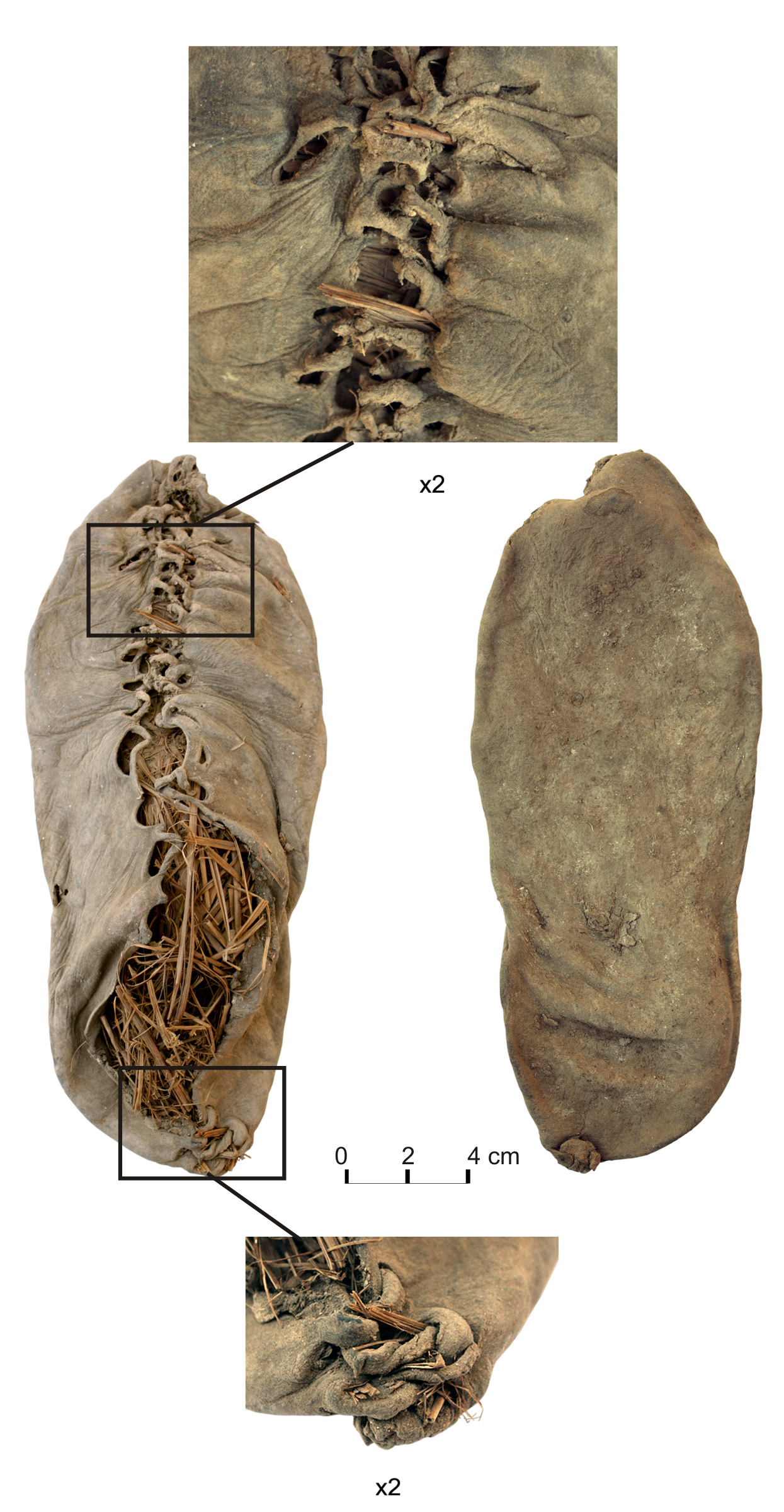
Chalcolithic leather shoe from Areni-1 cave

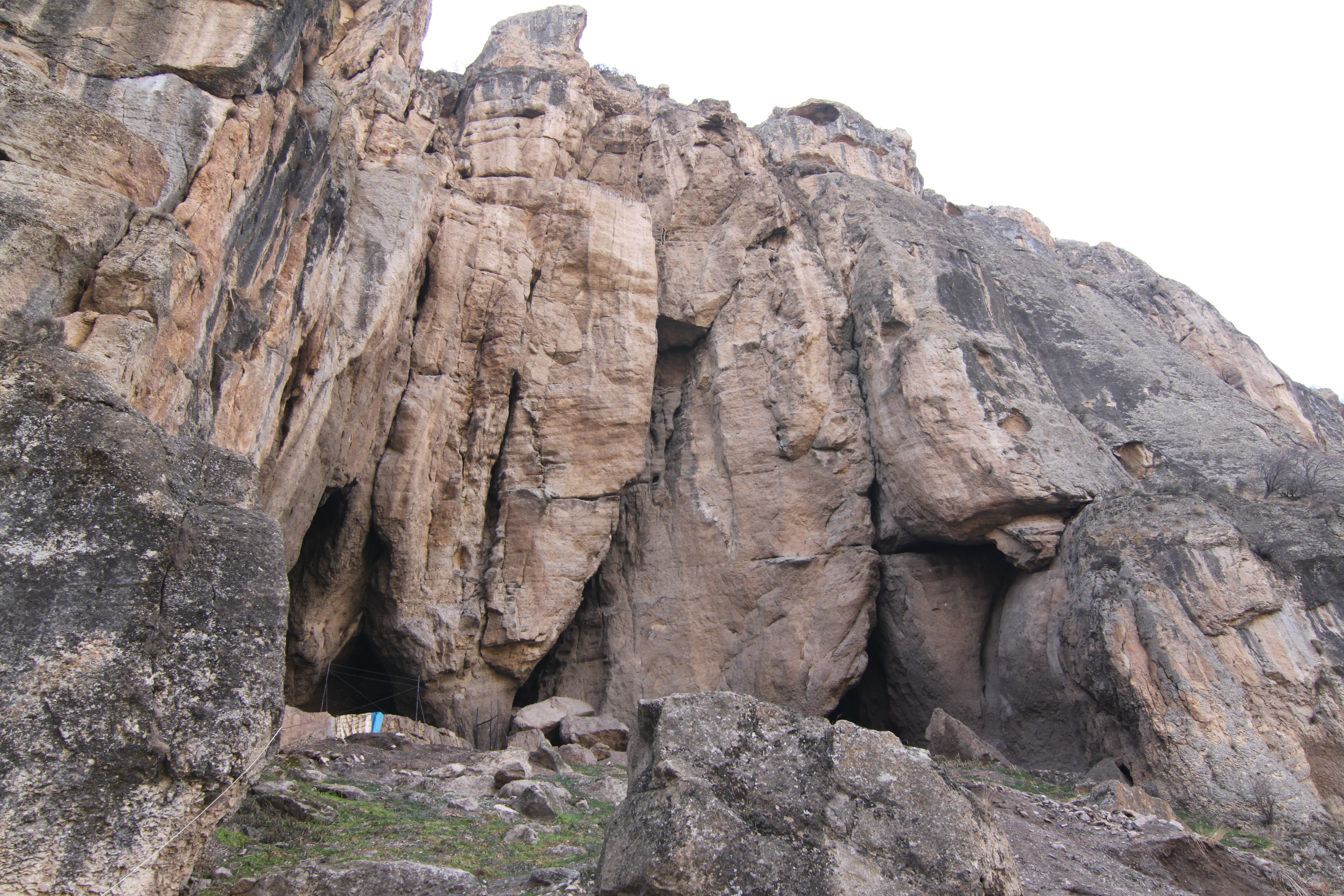
Entrance to the cave

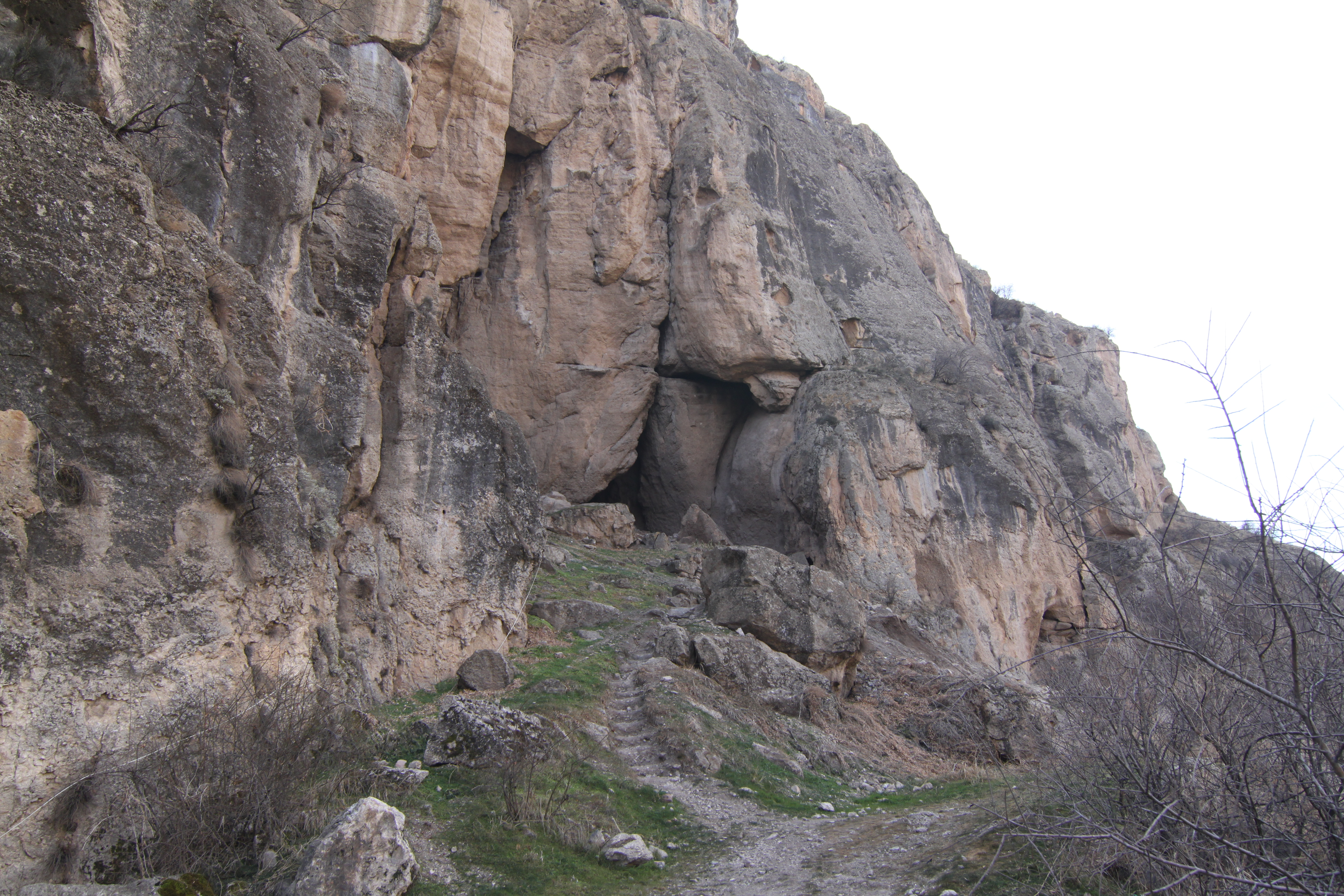
Pathway to the entrance

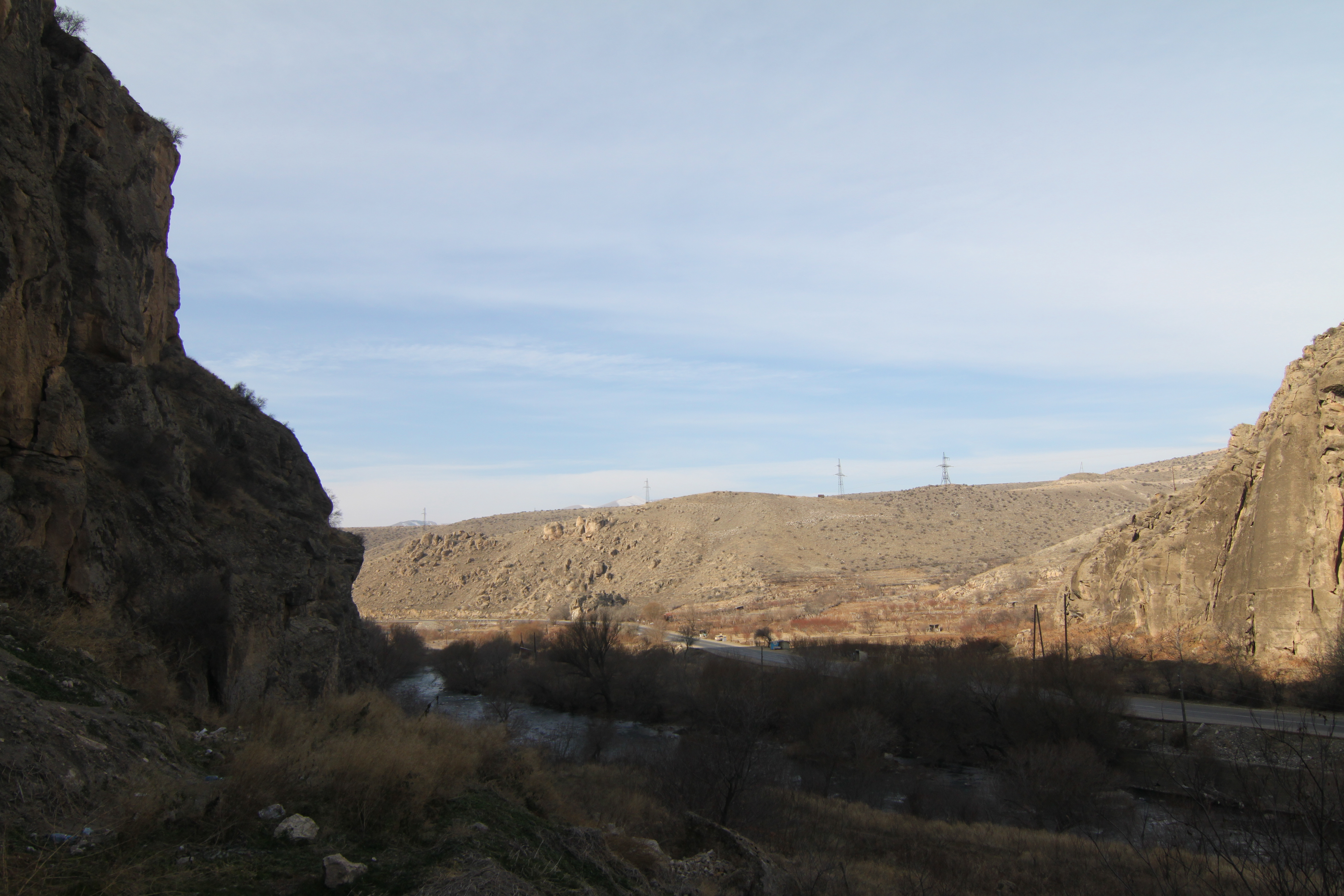
View from the cave

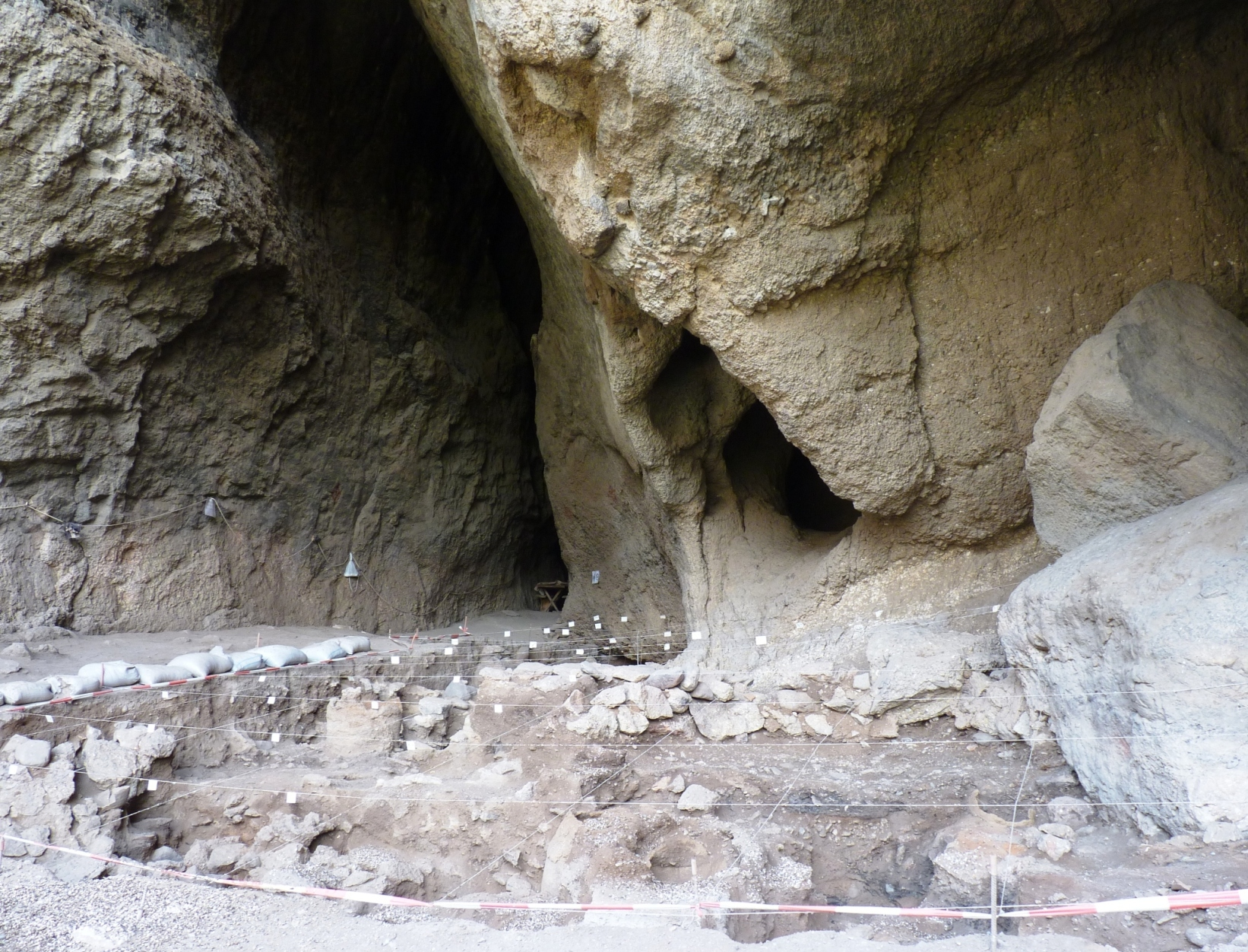
The site in 2012, swallow nests on the ceiling of the entrance.

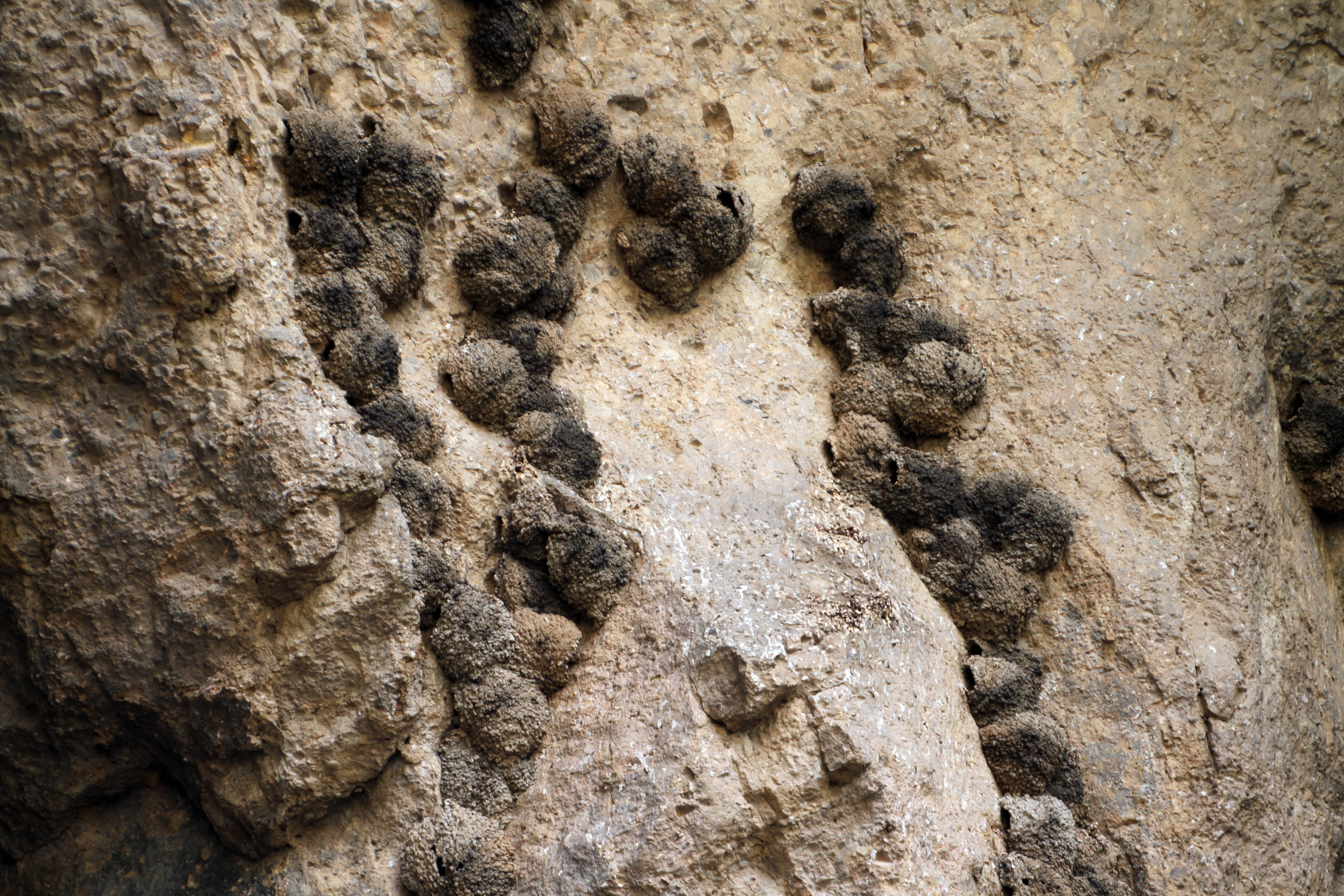
Swallow nests 2019

== See also ==
- Areni-1 shoe
- Areni-1 winery
