= Armenian Virtual College =

Armenian Online Institution

AGBU Armenian Virtual College
- Motto: Armenian Education Anytime, Anywhere
- Type: Distance Education
- Established: 2009
- President: Yervant Zorian
- Location: Yerevan, Armenia
- Website: www.avc-agbu.org

AGBU Armenian Virtual College (AVC) is an accredited online learning institution that facilitates Armenian Studies through new technologies. Although based in Yerevan, Armenia, the College primarily serves the Armenian Diaspora, where opportunities for learning Armenian vary from community to community. AVC’s mission is to preserve the Armenian identity providing learners around the world the opportunity to receive a full-fledged Armenian education, regardless of their age, country of residence or level of knowledge. AVC also strives to create a virtual learning community that fosters both the cultural education and social communication otherwise out of the reach of students who wish to pursue education in the field of Armenian Studies. As of today AVC has served more than 47,500 students from over 140 countries. Students can choose to earn credits for each course that they complete, ultimately leading to a certificate. Also, students may transfer credit from AVC courses to various universities and learning institutes across the world.

== History ==
The idea of AVC was born and the project was initiated in 2004 by Armenian General Benevolent Union (AGBU) Silicon Valley Chapter in order to better address the needs of students who wished to learn Armenian language, history and culture, but were unable to do so due to lack of schools in their location; the project also meant to offer a program in Armenian studies through an innovative approach and new technologies to appeal to present-day students. The inaugural academic term took place in 2009 with courses in Armenian language and Armenian history. Later, AVC multiplied the courses; Armenian culture and chess were added as subjects, and more languages of instruction were added. As of today, the courses are available on multiple levels and in eight languages of instruction: Eastern Armenian, Western Armenian, English, French, Russian, Spanish, Turkish, and Portuguese.

AVC partners with 91 schools and universities worldwide through its hybrid education program, which blends traditional and online learning. The program allows participating institutions to expand and supplement their curriculum with additional resources and introduce innovative learning methods.

In 2014, AVC launched a multiplatform media project, the AVC Multimedia e-Book Series, covering a variety of topics on Armenian geography, history, culture, and contemporary affairs. The multilingual series includes titles such as The Armenian Highland, Exploring Yerevan: A Look Inside the City’s Past and Present, Vayots Dzor, and From Kumayri to Gyumri, reaching over 40,000 users. The reader-friendly content includes interactive elements such as slideshows, 3D images, audio, and video features.

In partnership with AGBU Silicon Valley, the Union of Employers of Information and Communication Technologies (UEICT), and Synopsys Armenia, and with funding from the Synopsys Foundation, AVC implements the STEP.ai Artificial Intelligence Educational Program for high schools in Armenia. The program was officially accredited by the Ministry of Education, Science, Culture and Sports of the Republic of Armenia, with 15 schools participating during the 2025–2026 academic year. The program is designed to introduce students to the fundamental concepts of AI and machine learning to prepare them for careers in the technology sector.
