= Areni-1 shoe =

Archaeological artifact from Armenia

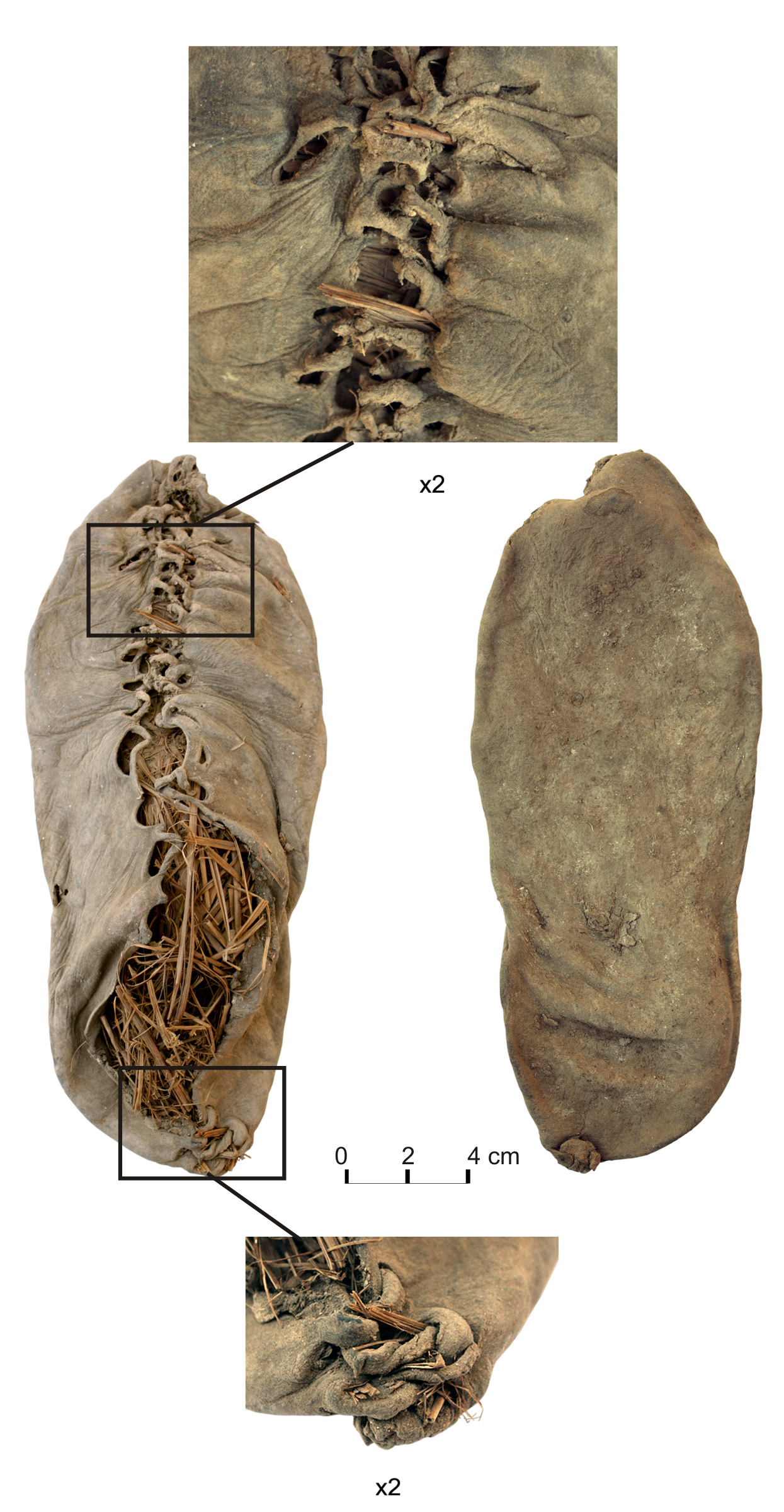
- Material: Leather
- Created: c. 3500 BC
- Discovered: 2008; Areni-1 cave, Vayots Dzor, Armenia
- Discovered by: Diana Zardaryan
- Present location: Yerevan, Armenia

The Areni-1 shoe is a 5,500-year-old leather shoe that was found in 2008 in excellent condition in the Areni-1 cave located in the Vayots Dzor province of Armenia. It is a one-piece leather-hide shoe, the oldest piece of leather footwear in the world known to contemporary researchers. The discovery was made by an international team led by Boris Gasparyan, an archaeologist from the Institute of Archaeology and Ethnography of the National Academy of Sciences of Armenia (co-directors of the project are Ron Pinhasi from University College Cork in Ireland, and Gregory Areshian from UCLA).

== Discovery ==
Diana Zardaryan, discovered the leather shoe during the course of excavations by a team of archeologists from Armenia's Institute of Archaeology and Ethnography, Ireland and the United States. The shoe was found upside down at the base of a shallow, rounded, and plastered pit that was 45 cm (18 in) deep and 44–48 cm (17–19 in) wide, beneath an overturned broken Chalcolithic ceramic bowl. A broken pot and goat horns also were found nearby. Excavations in the same area also found the world's oldest known wine-making site.

The research was funded by the National Geographic Society, the Chitjian Foundation, the Gfoeller Foundation, the Steinmetz Family Foundation, the Boochever Foundation and the Cotsen Institute of Archaeology at UCLA. The team's findings were published on June 9, 2010, in the journal PLOS One.

== Analysis ==
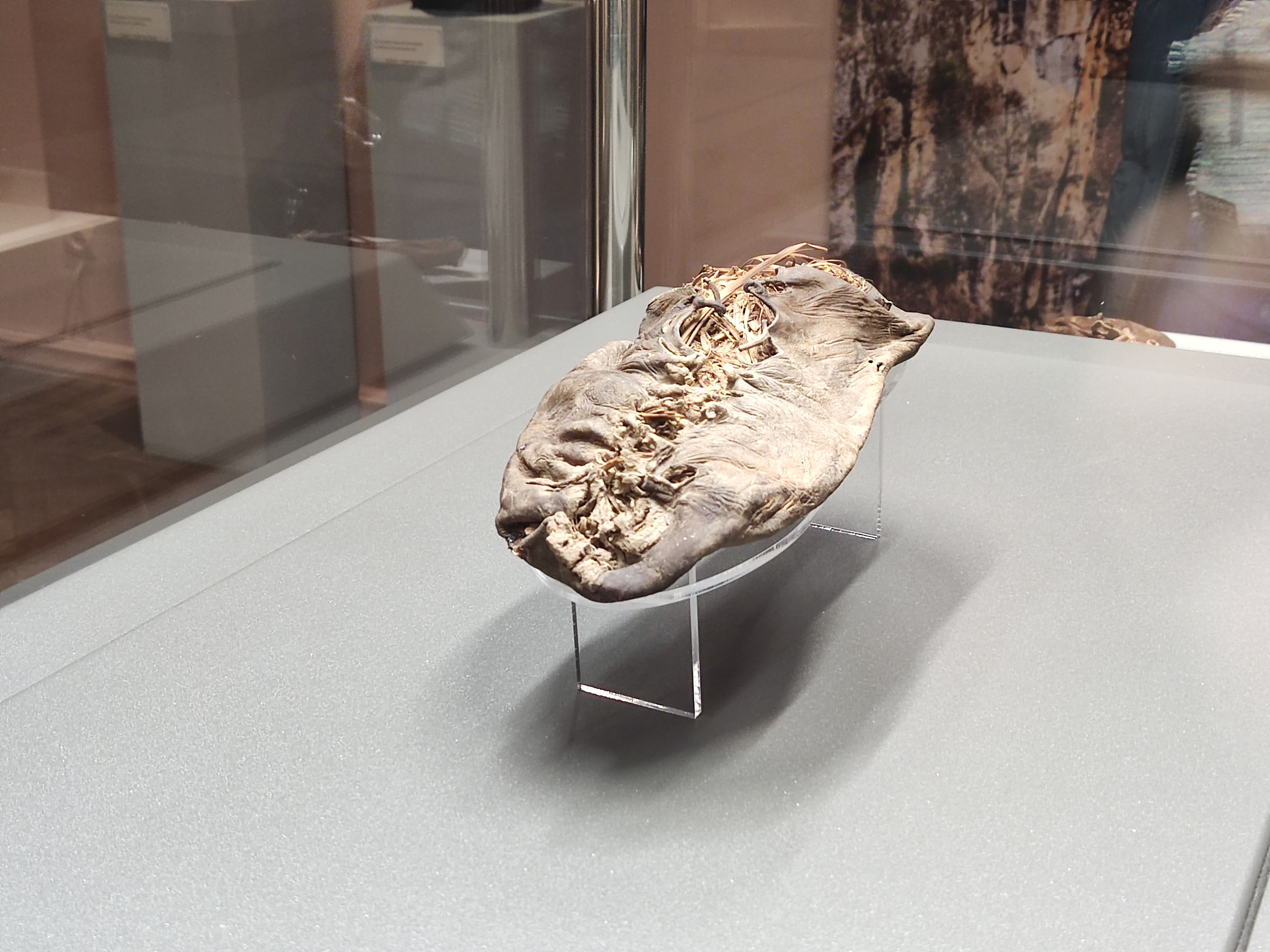
The shoe on display at the History Museum of Armenia.

The shoe was found in near-perfect condition due to the cool and dry conditions in the cave and a thick layer of sheep dung which acted as a solid seal. Large storage containers were found in the same cave, many of which held well-preserved wheat, barley, and apricots, as well as other edible plants. The shoe contained grass and the archaeologists were uncertain as to whether this was because the grass was used as insulation to keep the foot warm, or used to preserve the shape of the shoe while not being worn. Lead archaeologist Ron Pinhasi could not determine whether the shoe belonged to a man or a woman. While small, approximately a woman's United States and Canada size 7, European size 37, or United Kingdom size 6, he stated that "the shoe could well have fitted a man from that era". The shoe laces were preserved as well.

Major similarities exist between the manufacturing technique and style of one-piece leather-hide shoes discovered across Europe and the one reported from Areni-1 Cave, suggesting that shoes of this type were worn for millennia across a large and environmentally diverse geographic region. According to Pinhasi, the Areni-1 shoe is similar to the Irish pampootie, a shoe style worn in the Aran Islands up to the 1950s. The shoes are very similar to the traditional shoes of the Balkans, still seen today in festivals, known as Opanci (Opanke).

When the material was dated by the two radiocarbon laboratories in Oxford and California, it was established that the shoe dates back to 3,500 BC. This date is some two hundred years older than the date given for the leather shoe found on Ötzi the Iceman.

After having been treated for preservation, the Areni-1 shoe is on display at the History Museum of Armenia, Yerevan.

== See also ==
- Areni-1 winery
- List of shoe styles
