= Arpa (river) =

River in Armenia

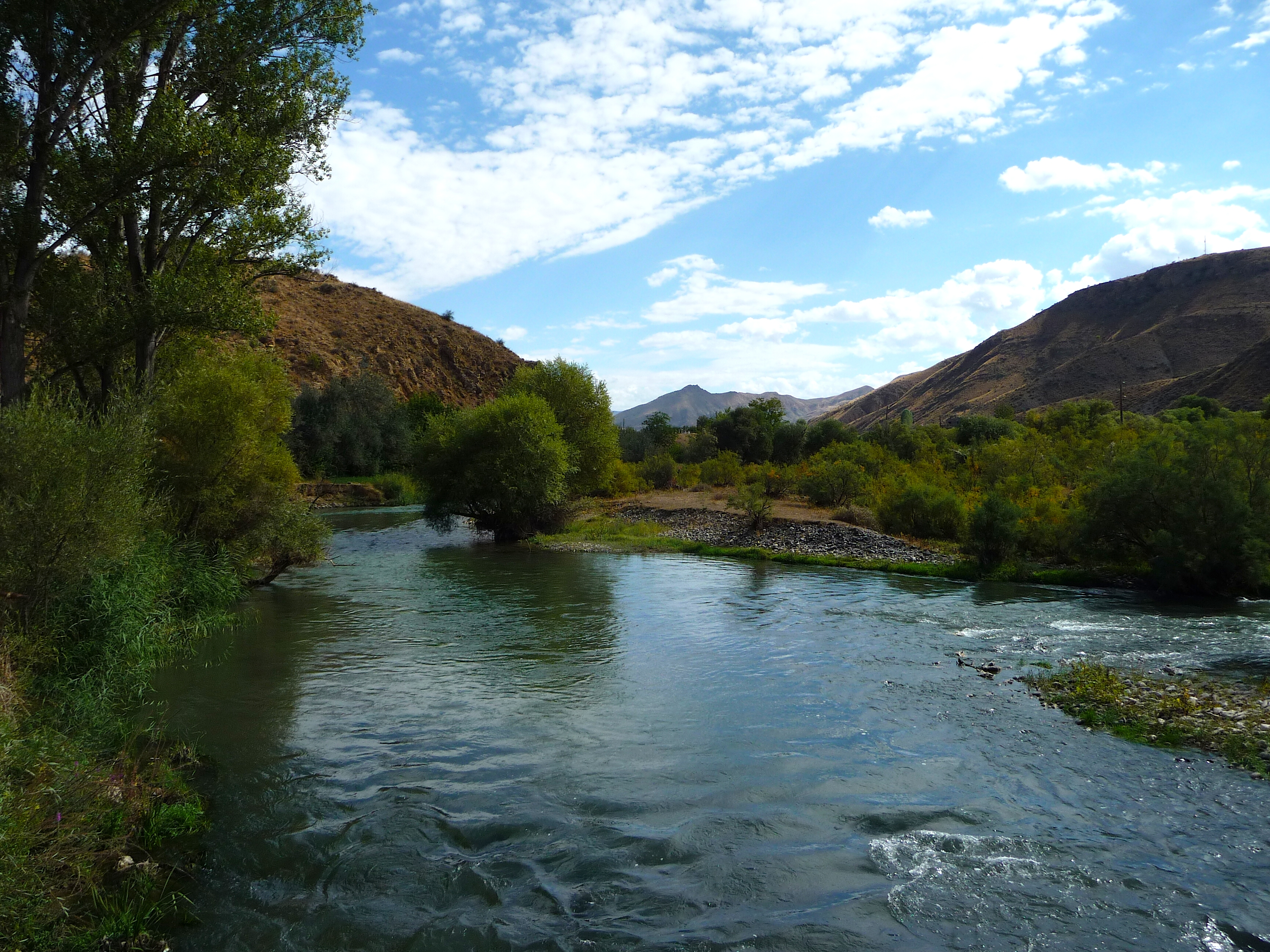
- Arpa river in Vayots Dzor, Armenia

Location
- Country: Armenia, Azerbaijan

Physical characteristics
- Mouth: Aras
  - coordinates: 39°28′07″N 44°56′49″E
- Length: 128 km (80 mi)
- Basin size: 2,630 km^{2} (1,020 sq mi)

Basin features
- Progression: Aras→ Kura→ Caspian Sea

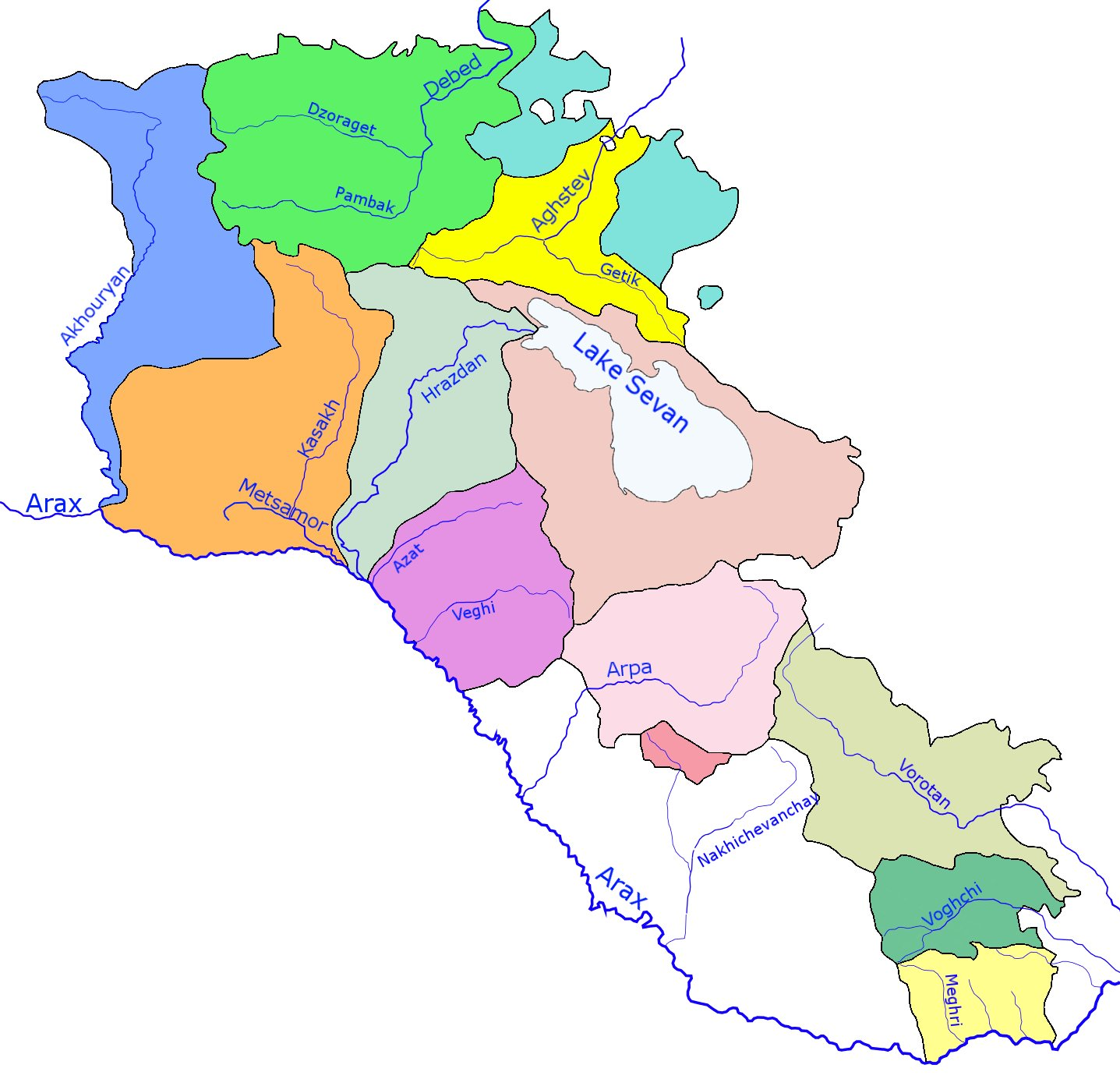
The Arpa river and its basin (light pink) within Armenia

The Arpa (Armenian: Արփա; Azerbaijani: Arpaçay) is a river that flows through Armenia and Azerbaijan. Originating in Armenia's Vayots Dzor province (marz), it is a left tributary of the Aras. It is 128 km (80 mi) long, and has a drainage basin of 2,630 km^{2} (1,020 sq mi). It originates on the slopes of the Zangezur Range and runs through many cities and towns, including Jermuk, Vayk, Yeghegnadzor, Areni, and then reaches Azerbaijan's Nakhchivan exclave, flowing through Oğlanqala, Siyaqut and Qışlaqabbas.

== See also ==
- List of lakes of Armenia
- List of rivers of Azerbaijan
- Geography of Armenia
- Geography of Azerbaijan
