= Karam Mustafayev =

Azerbaijani military officer

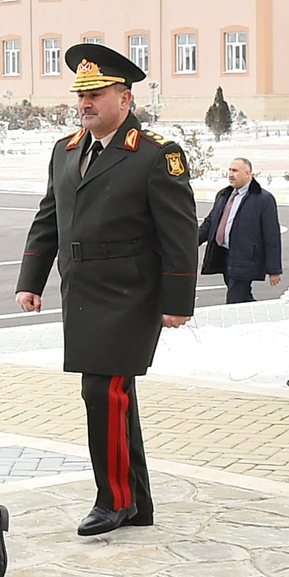
- Mustafayev in 2017.
- Native name: Kərəm Nəriman oğlu Mustafayev
- Born: Karam Nariman oglu Mustafayev; July 1, 1962 (age 63); Sharur District, Azerbaijani SSR, Soviet Union
- Allegiance: Soviet Armed Forces (1983–1991); Azerbaijani Armed Forces (1991–)
- Branch: Soviet Army (1983–1991); Azerbaijani Land Forces (1991–)
- Service years: 1983–
- Rank: Colonel general
- Commands: Nakhchivan Garrison (2014–)
- Conflicts: First Nagorno-Karabakh War; Operation Gyunnut; Second Nagorno-Karabakh War
- Awards: Azerbaijani Flag Order; For service to the Fatherland Order; Rashadat Order
- Alma mater: Baku Higher Combined Arms Command School; Nakhchivan State University; War College of the Azerbaijani Armed Forces

Karam Nariman oglu Mustafayev (Azerbaijani: Kərəm Nəriman oğlu Mustafayev; born 1962) is an Azerbaijani military officer, colonel general serving as the deputy minister of defence of Azerbaijan and the commander of the Nakhchivan Garrison of the Azerbaijani Armed Forces.

== Early life ==
Karam Nariman oglu Mustafayev was born on 1 July 1962, in Sharur District of the Nakhchivan ASSR within the Azerbaijani SSR, which was then part of the Soviet Union. He graduated from the Baku Higher Combined Arms Command School in 1983, Nakhchivan State University in 2002, and the War College of the Azerbaijani Armed Forces in 2006.

== Military career ==
Karam Mustafayev started his military service in 1983. Until 1992, he served as a platoon commander, division commander and battalion commander in the Soviet Armed Forces.

Mustafayev played a special role in organizing the defence of the Nakhchivan Autonomous Republic against the Armenian forces during the First Nagorno-Karabakh War. Starting from 1992, he served as a battalion commander in the Azerbaijani Armed Forces, the deputy chief of staff-brigade commander of the Special Reinforced Motorized Rifle Brigade, the commander of the Special Reinforced Motorized Rifle Brigade, the commander of the Motorized Rifle Division, and the commander of the 5th Army Corps. Mustafayev was appointed the deputy minister of defence of Azerbaijan on 21 December 2013, by the decree of the President of Azerbaijan, Ilham Aliyev. He was appointed the commander of the Nakhchivan Garrison on 14 May 2014, by the decree of the President Aliyev.

In 2010s, Mustafayev worked on to create new military units in Nakhchivan and modernise the infrastructure in existing military units. His reforms were to ensure sustainable defence in the first operational echelon units, and improving the defense system. Mustafayev's efforts had improved the staffing of military units in Nakhchivan. During Mustafayev's leadership, the Heydar Aliyev Military Lyceum also developed, with the number of cadets studying at the lyceum reaching 318.

On 18 October 2017, on the Independence Day of Azerbaijan, the 25th anniversary of the establishment of the first national military unit in the Nakhchivan Autonomous Republic was celebrated with a military parade, which Mustayafev took part in. Mustafayev also reported on preparations for the parade to chairman of the Supreme Assembly of Nakhchivan, Vasif Talibov.

Mustafayev had played a major role in bringing Azerbaijan closer to Turkey. In mid-2018, Azerbaijan and Turkey conducted a large-scale joint tactical exercises. The Nakhchivan Garrison under Mustafayev's command and the Third Army of the Turkish Armed Forces took part in the training. Further training courses, purposed in intelligence and mountaineering, were jointly held with Turkey at the end of 2018, in which special purpose, reconnaissance and rescue units of the Nakhchivan Garrison, led by Mustafayev, were involved. In June 2019, another joint tactical exercises with Turkey were held in Nakhchivan. After the July 2020 Armenian–Azerbaijani clashes, Mustafayev went to Turkey, to meet with Turkish minister of national defence, Hulusi Akar, and the President of Defence Industries, İsmail Demir. Then, in September 2020, Azerbaijan and Turkey held the first stage of large-scale combat tactical and tactical flight training in Nakhchivan with the participation of the ground forces and air forces of the two countries. He also met Akar after the Second Nagorno-Karabakh war, on 23 December 2020.

Mustafayev commanded the Azerbaijani forces during the Operation Gyunnut in May 2018. In July 2018, Mustayafev took part in the establishment of the defence systems in Gyunnut.

== Personal life ==
Karam Mustafayev is married and has three children. He also has a brother, Nemat Mustafayev.

== Awards ==
- Mustafayev was awarded the Azerbaijani Flag Order on 24 June 2003, by the decree of the then President of Azerbaijan, Heydar Aliyev.
- Mustafayev was awarded the For Military Services Medal on 22 June 2006, by the decree of the President of Azerbaijan, Ilham Aliyev.
- Mustafayev was awarded the For Fatherland Medal on 25 June 2009, by the decree of the President Aliyev.
- Mustafayev was awarded the 3rd-class For service to the Fatherland Order on 25 June 2011, by the decree of the President Aliyev.
- Mustafayev was awarded the 2nd-class For service to the Fatherland Order on 23 June 2014, by the decree of the President Aliyev.
- Mustafayev was awarded the 1st-class For service to the Fatherland Order on 23 June 2014, by the decree of the President Aliyev.
- Mustafayev was awarded the 1st-class Rashadat Order on 25 June 2018, by the decree of the President Aliyev.
- Mustafayev was promoted to colonel general on 25 June 2020, by the decree of the President Aliyev.

== See also ==
- Khosrow Mustafayev
