= 2018 Armenian–Azerbaijani clashes =

Clashes in Nakhchivan in 2018

- Part of the Nagorno-Karabakh conflict
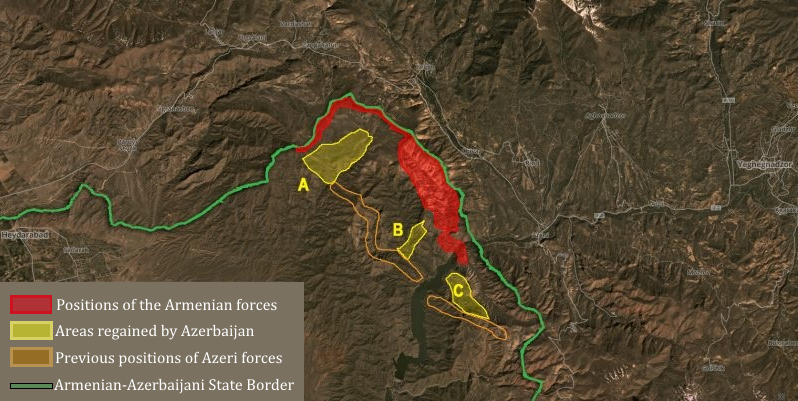
Date	20–27 May 2018 (1 week)
Location	Sharur and Sadarak districts, Nakhchivan Autonomous Republic, Azerbaijan
Result	See Aftermath section

Belligerents
Armenia	Azerbaijan

Commanders and leaders
(Armenia) Nikol Pashinyan (Armenia) Armen Sargsyan (Armenia) David Tonoyan	(Azerbaijan) Ilham Aliyev (Azerbaijan) Zakir Hasanov (Azerbaijan) Tehran Mansimov

Units involved
Armed Forces of Armenia	Azerbaijani Armed Forces: Nakhchivan Garrison

Casualties and losses
2 soldiers killed	1 soldier killed

The 2018 Armenian–Azerbaijani clashes (Note: Also known as the Operation Gyunnut (Azerbaijani: Günnüt əməliyyatı) or Gyunnut clashes (Armenian: Գյուննուտի բախումներ, romanized: Gyunnuti bakhumner; Azerbaijani: Günnüt döyüşləri).) began on 20 May 2018 between the Armenian Armed Forces and Azerbaijani Armed Forces. Azerbaijan stated to have taken several villages and strategic positions within the Nakhchivan Autonomous Republic. However, these areas had previously been part of a no man's land between the Azerbaijani and Armenian lines.

One soldier of the Azerbaijani Armed Forces, and one or two soldiers of the Armenian Armed Forces were reported KIA during the military operations.

== Background ==
Azerbaijan accused Armenian forces of seizing control of Gyunnut, which is located Sharur District of Nakhchivan Autonomous Republic, in 1992.

On 16 May 2018 Azerbaijani President Ilham Aliyev visited the Nakhchivan Autonomous Republic. He stated that Nakhchivan branch of the Azerbaijani Army possessed missiles which could easily reach Armenia's capital, Yerevan. Two days later, on 17 May Armenia's new Minister of Defence and Foreign Affairs visited the Armenian–Nakhchivan border to inspect military positions.

== Clashes ==
According to some Azerbaijani military bloggers and news sites, Azerbaijani positions in the Sharur District of Nakhchivan Autonomous Republic became exposed to artillery fire of the Armenian Armed Forces.

On the end of May, Nakhchivan Separate Combined-arms Army claimed to have control of Gyunnut, a village in Sharur District that has been completely destroyed by the Armenian forces in 1992, and two strategic positions, Khunutdagh and Aghbulag. Azerbaijani Armed Forces also claimed control of and took new positions on Kyzylkaya and Mehridagh strategic positions. They also claimed to have new positions in a previously unoccupied neutral zone in Nakhchivan near Armenian village of Areni in Vayots Dzor Province.

== Aftermath ==
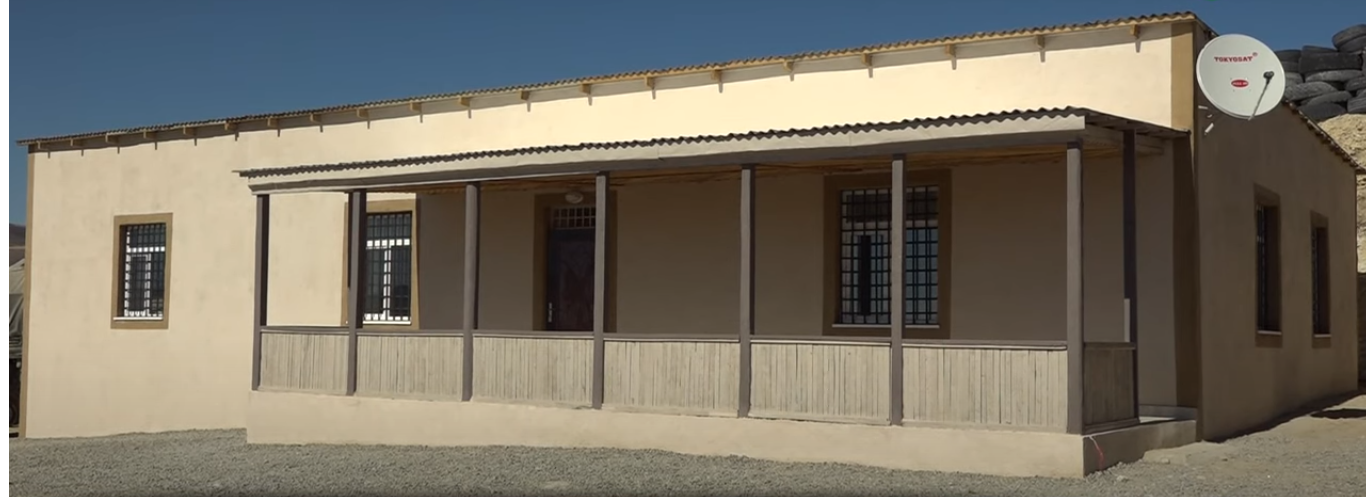
Azerbaijani army built military posts in Gyunnut after the operation.

Eurasianet reported that Azerbaijani claims of advancement had been highly exaggerated, and whatever territory Azerbaijan had claimed control over was never claimed by Armenia, adding that "while the details of the Azerbaijani advance remain unclear, the lofty rhetoric seems to be a significant exaggeration. Whatever new territory Azerbaijan controls militarily was never claimed by Armenia, and it's not clear if there was any fighting.".

The Armenian Ministry of Defense made a statement against Azerbaijani claims of territorial advances, claiming that a request by Azerbaijani citizens to visit the cemetery in the ruins of Gyunnut had been granted as a humanitarian gesture. Footage of Azerbaijani villagers being escorted to the cemetery was released to confirm this.

Armenia's Foreign Ministry condemned Azerbaijan's actions at the border as "unacceptable and irresponsible steps aimed at escalating the situation". They also said that "it is regrettable but at the same time very predictable practice of Azerbaijan to exploit any display of goodwill and humanistic approach [from] Armenia for its own propagandistic purposes". They also warned that "any provocative action on the Azerbaijani side will be immediately stopped and will trigger the adequate response from the Armenian side".

Azerbaijani military experts accused Armenia of planning an attack on Nakhchivan Autonomous Republic.

On 8 June 2018 Azerbaijani Government announced that they started to build a new road that would be 50 km long. They also started to rebuild the roads that were destroyed during the First Nagorno-Karabakh War. Azerbaijani Armed Forces have taken up new positions in strategic locations.

Arif Mamedov, a former Azerbaijani diplomat and EU Ambassador, criticized the coverage by the Azerbaijani press on a Facebook post: "Is there at least one reasonable person who believes in fairy tales that 11 thousand hectares of land could be liberated in Nakhichevan without a fight? Do they understand what 11 thousand hectares means, or is everything so tragic even with their math? Once Armenians occupied only the Kyark enclave in that territory, formerly inhabited by Azerbaijanis. Nakhichevan territories, including the village of Gyunnut, have never been occupied. Our official maps prove this too. It is ridiculous to imagine the empty village of Gyunnut village, which is in a neutral zone and has no military significance, as a strategic area. We have heard about less than 5 percent of the unemployment rate in the country, human rights protection in Azerbaijan and the collapse of Germany. Now they tell us fairy tales about victories. How many people can be fed by fairy tales?"

Two years later, Azerbaijan would launch an offensive against the self-proclaimed Republic of Artsakh, beginning the 2020 Nagorno-Karabakh war.

=== Casualties ===
==== Azerbaijani casualties ====
On 20 May 2018 Azerbaijan's Ministry of Defence reported the death of infantryman Adil Tatarov who died while "carrying out an official assignment on the border of [Nakhchivan] and Armenia". The Armenian side stated that the corresponding Azerbaijani soldier had advanced towards the border. In response the Defence Ministry of Armenia accused Azerbaijan of breaking the ceasefire and said that "in recent weeks, at certain sections of the Armenian-Azerbaijani border Azerbaijani forces are conducting active engineering works to improve and move forward their positions". Nevertheless, on 6 June Adil Tatarov received the "For Heroism" Medal with an order of Defense Minister of Azerbaijan, colonel-general Zakir Hasanov.

Rank	Name	Birth date	Burial date	Place of Burial
Private	Adil Ali oglu Tatarov	1999	21 May 2018	Kyrakh Kesaman, Agstafa District, Azerbaijan

==== Armenian casualties ====
Azerbaijani Ministry of Defence claimed that three Armenian soldiers were killed during the operation. Armenian Ministry of Defence confirmed the death of Martin Khachatryan, but denied the claims of Hamlet Grigoryan getting killed in Northern Nakhchivan. They reported that he committed suicide in Eastern parts of de facto independent Nagorno-Karabakh Republic.

Rank	Name	Birth date	Burial date	Place of burial
Private	Martin Grigor Khachatryan	1999	23 May 2018	?
Private	Hamlet Norayr Grigoryan (disputed)	1999	21 May 2018	?
