= Areni =

Areni Արենի
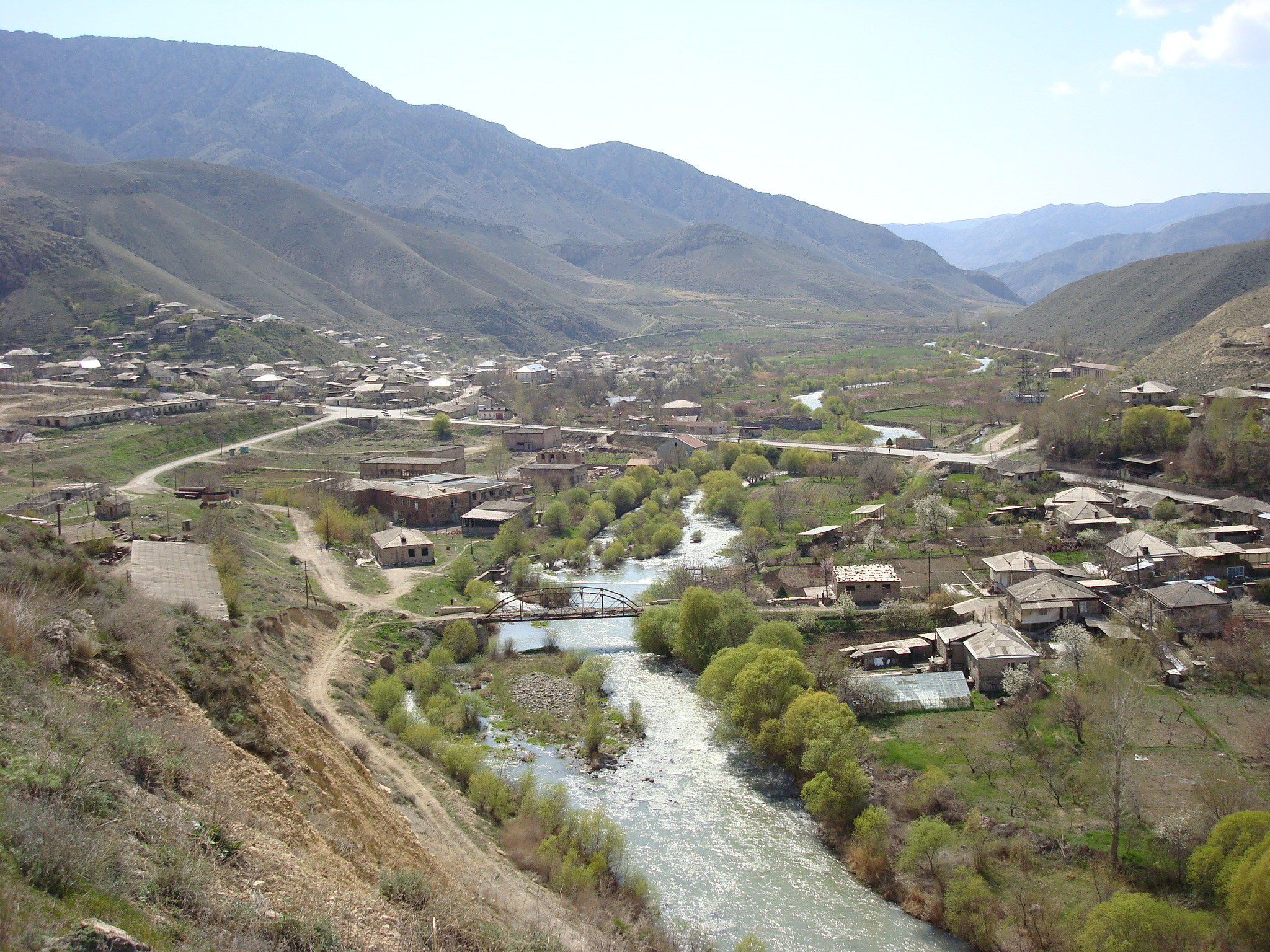

- Location within Armenia Location within Vayots Dzor
- Coordinates: 39°43′15″N 45°11′02″E
- Country: Armenia
- Province: Vayots Dzor
- Municipality: Areni
- Elevation: 990 m (3,250 ft)

Population (2011)
  - Total: 1,772
- Time zone: UTC+4 (AMT)

Areni (Armenian: Արենի) is a village and the center of the Areni Municipality of the Vayots Dzor Province in Armenia. Areni is best known for its wine production, with the majority of wine produced locally from the nearby village of Getap.

== Toponymy ==
The village was previously known as Arpa. In 1946, the name of the settlement was changed to Areni through a decree (10/9) issued by the Supreme Council of Soviet Armenia.

== Geography ==
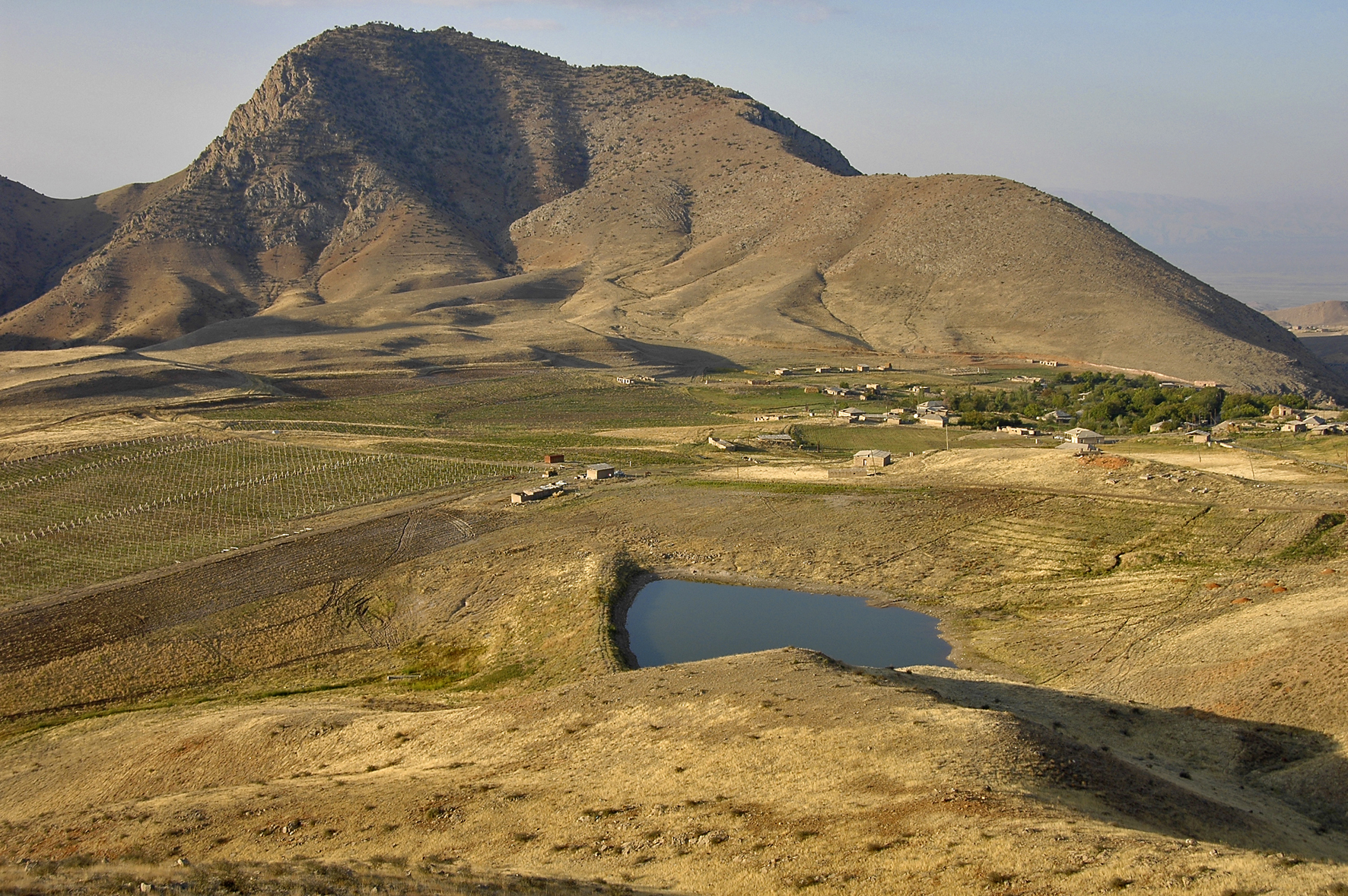
Areni village as seen from the highway

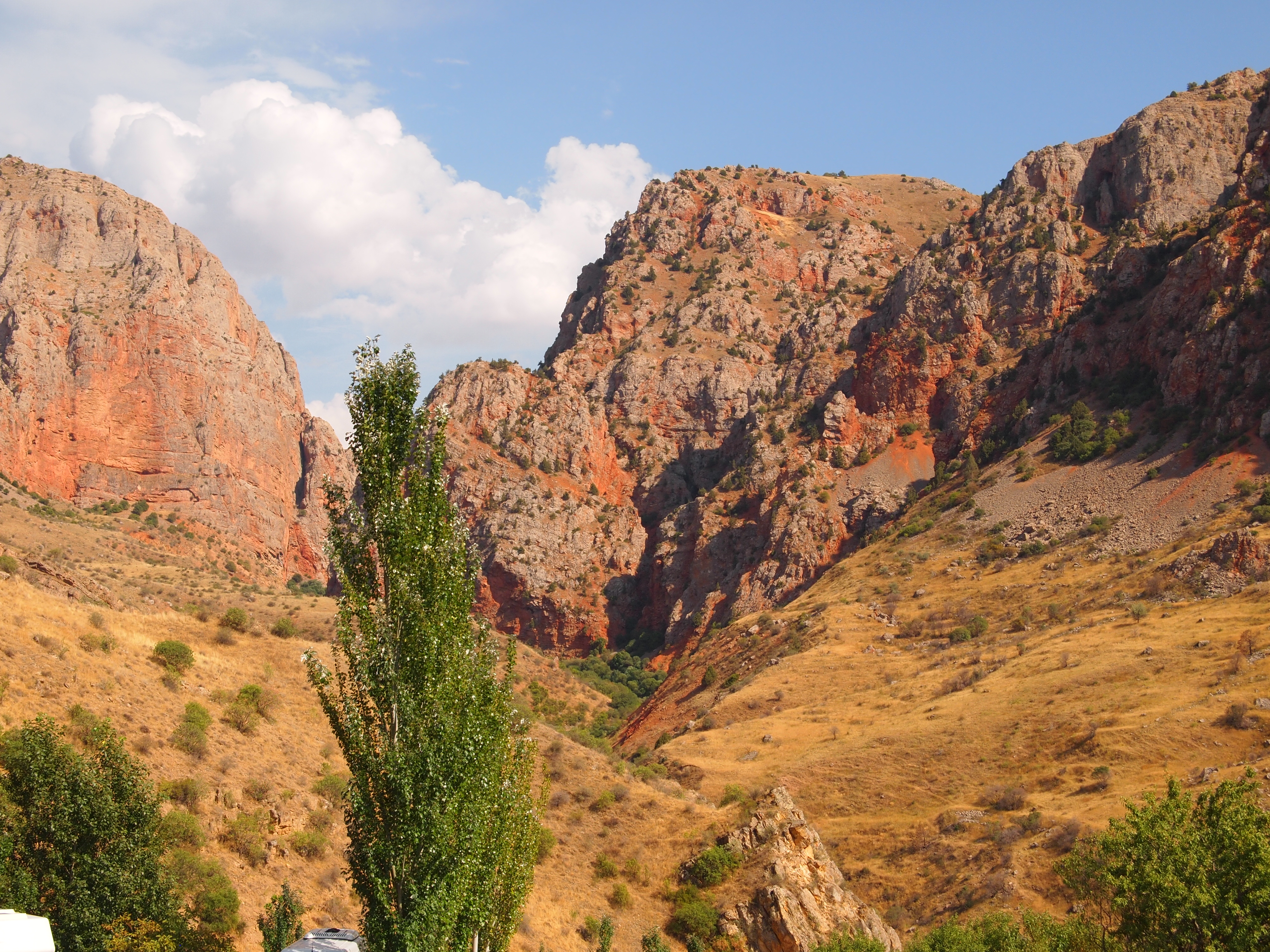
Scenery around Areni

Situated in the Vayots Dzor region, Areni village is positioned on both banks of the lower Arpa River. It is 110 km away from the capital city of Yerevan, and 20 km away from Yeghegnadzor, the province center.

Natural habitats include semidesert, calcareous grasslands, and juniper woodlands alternated with cliffs, canyons, and rocky outcrops. Vicinity of Areni community have been considered as a Prime Butterfly Area, where a wide variety of rare butterflies, including Papilio alexanor, Colias chlorocoma, Colias aurorina, Pseudochazara schahrudensis, Tomares romanovi, Callophrys paulae, and a number of others can be observed.

Also the area is interesting for bird observations, being inhabited by Egyptian Vulture, White-throated Robin, Eastern Rock Nuthatch, Black-headed Bunting, and number of other species.

=== Climate ===
The village experiences a dry climate, but the majority of the land is irrigated using river water. Winters are moderately cold and relatively short, while springs are warm, lengthy, and humid. Summers are characterized by hot, dry weather that lasts for an extended period. Constant clear weather prevails. Autumns are warm with fewer cloudy days. The local population is involved in various activities such as gardening, arable farming, poultry farming, and animal husbandry. The community places a strong emphasis on viticulture and winemaking, along with the development of fruit cultivation, which has led to relatively high employment rates and significantly reduced emigration. Areni village is home to two wine factories that produce the renowned "Areni" wine.

== History ==
Areni stands as one of the distinguished and ancient villages in the Vayots Dzor Province. In ancient times, it resided about half a kilometer north of its current location, situated atop a hill where the Holy Mother of God Church, constructed by the architect Momik in 1321, remains standing to this day. The village's territory is rich in ancient remnants, including various ancient sites, several abandoned settlements, numerous khachkars (cross-stones) adorned with inscriptions, and picturesque caves.

Areni possesses abundant tourism resources, comprising significant historical and cultural monuments. Within the community's administrative area lies the renowned Noravank complex. Additionally, numerous natural wonders can be found, including rocks, waterfalls, and deep ravines.

At the heart of the village, the residents of Areni have raised a memorial to honor their fellow villagers who lost their lives in the Second World War, along with a khachkar (cross-stone) dedicated to the fallen heroes of the Artsakh War.

Since 2004, Areni village has been hosting an annual wine festival in October, which has now become a tradition.

== Historical heritage sites ==
The Astvatsatsin Church of Areni in the village, is a single-nave two-aisled domed Armenian church completed in the year 1321, and is located atop a plateau overlooking the Arpa River and Areni. The church was designed by the architect and sculptor Momik who is best known for his high-relief carvings at the monastery of Noravank (located approximately 6 kilometers southeast from Areni).

Nearby are also the 13th century ruins of lord Tarsaitch Orbelian of Syunik's palace, moved from Yeghegis to Areni during that time. Ruins of a 13th-century bridge built by Bishop Sarkis in 1265–1287 are one kilometer northeast of the church. At the same location are the remains of an older bridge.

== Copper Age excavations ==
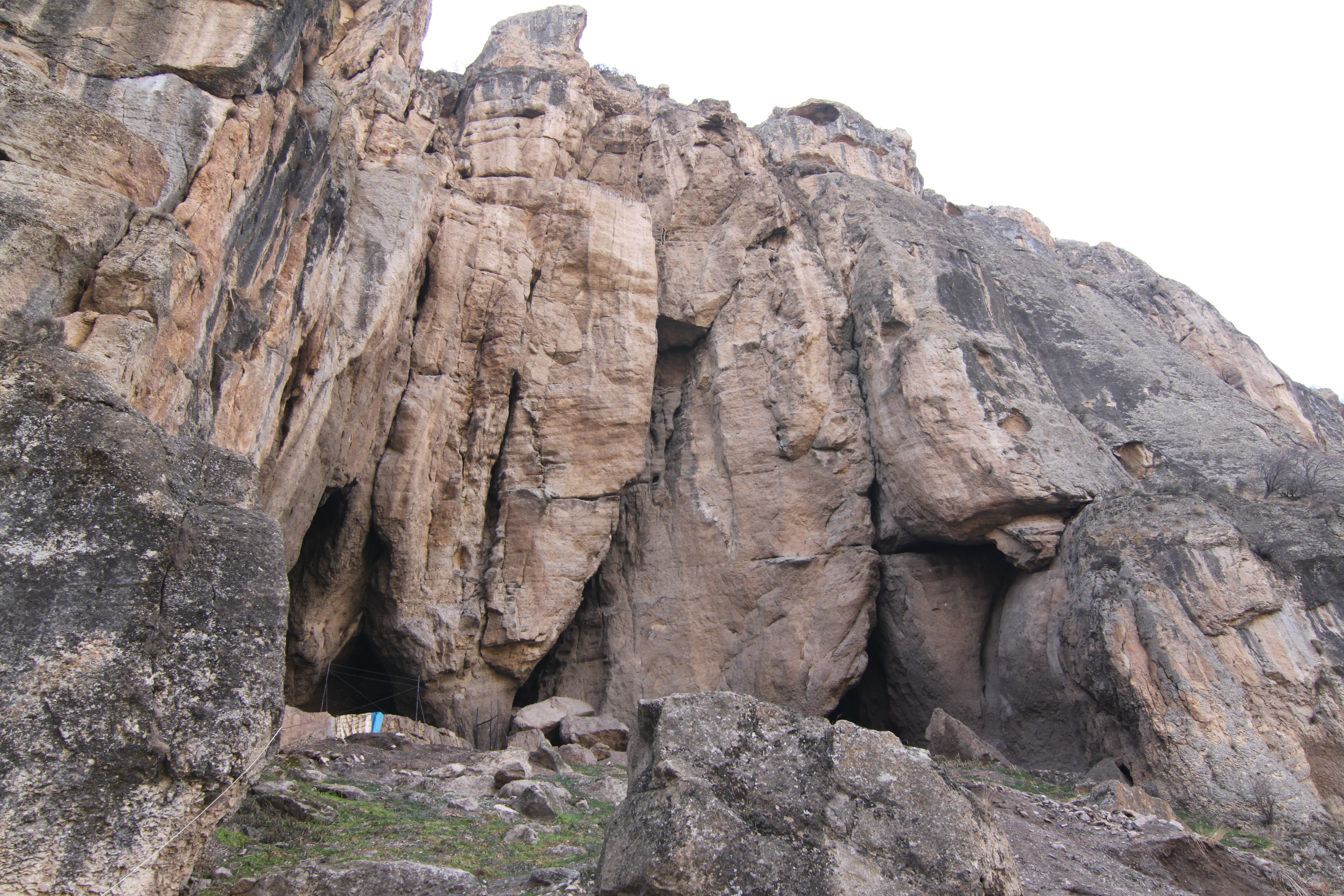
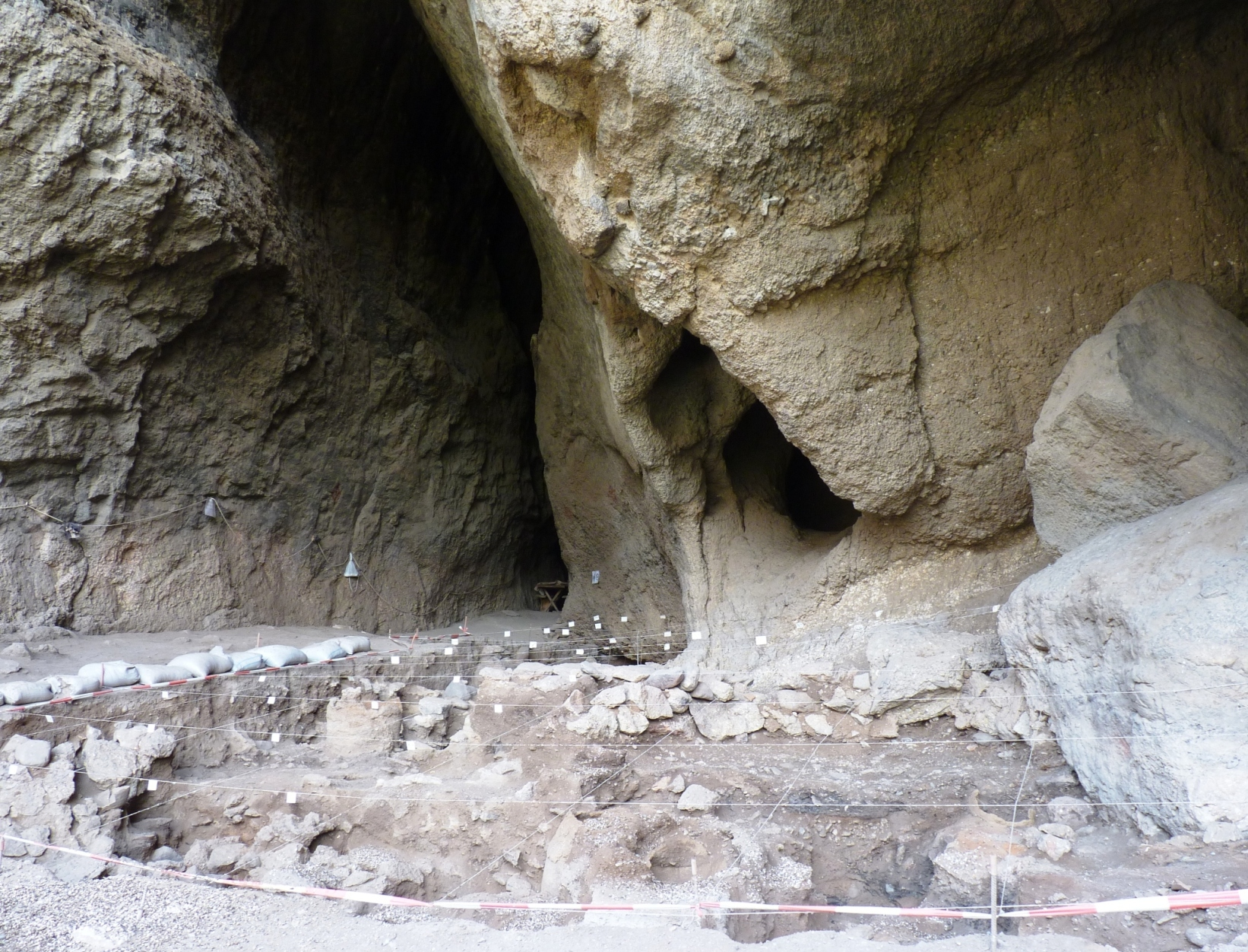
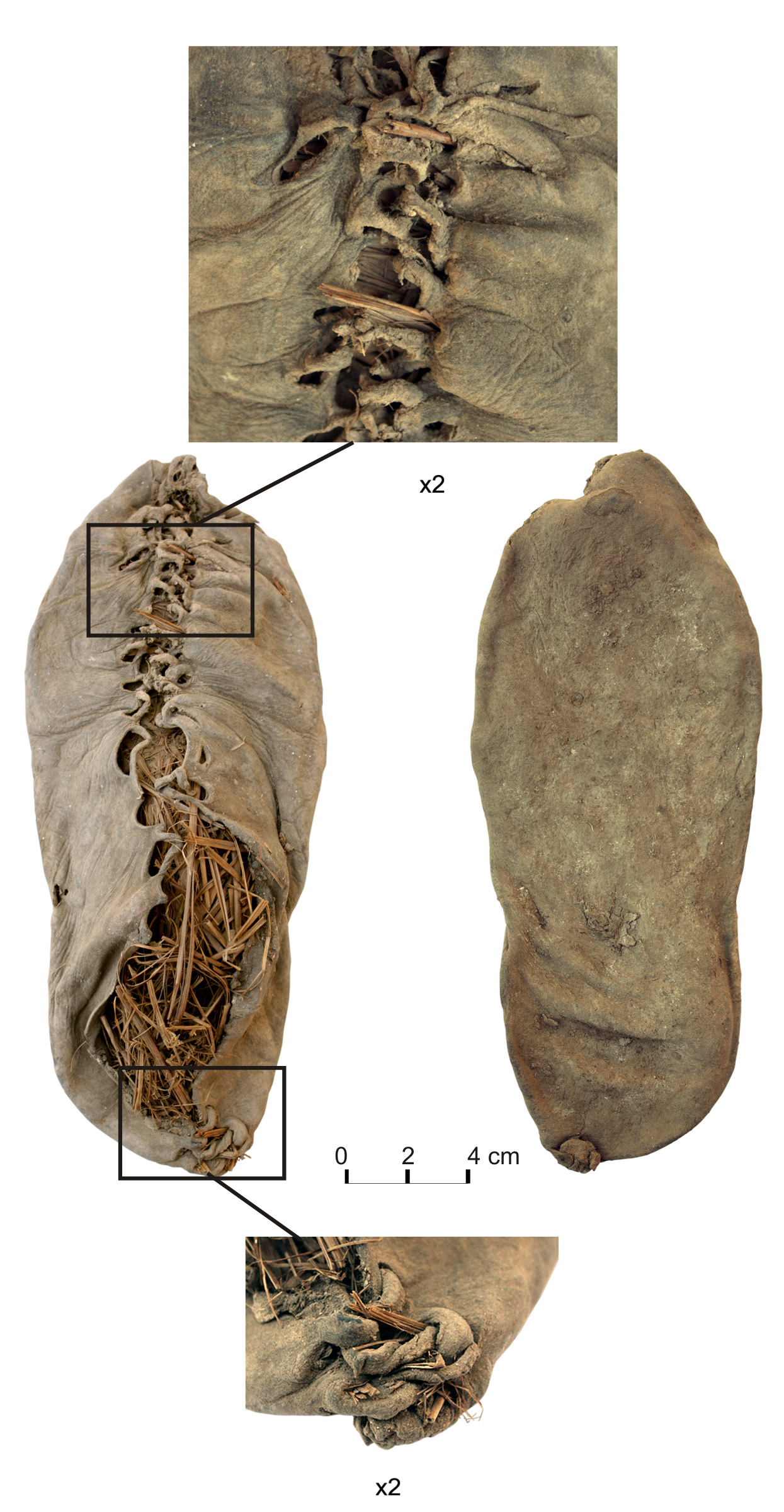
Entrance of the Areni-1 cave complex, the archaeological site of Areni-1 in 2012, and the 5,550 years old Areni-1 shoe.

In 2007, an Armenian-Irish team decided to do test excavations in the cave site of Areni 1. Two test trenches in the front and rear galleries revealed Chalcolithic Age and Early Bronze Age layers dating back to 5000–4000 BCE. Excavations during 2007–2008 uncovered 3 pot burials in the rear chamber of the cave. Each pot contained a Copper Age human skull with no associated grave goods. All skulls belong to subadults of 9–16 years of age. These are currently being analyzed by the team's biological anthropologist. Remarkably, one skull contained a piece of a well-preserved brain tissue. This is the oldest known human brain from the Old World.

The cave has also offered surprising new insights into the origins of modern civilizations, such as evidence of a wine-making enterprise and an array of culturally diverse pottery. Excavations also yielded an extensive array of Copper Age artifacts dating to between 4,200 and 3,900 BCE. The new discoveries within the cave move early bronze-age cultural activity in Armenia back by about 800 years. Additional discoveries at the site include metal knives, seeds from more than 30 types of fruit, remains of dozens of cereal species, rope, cloth, straw, grass, reeds and dried grapes and prunes.

In January 2011 archaeologists announced the discovery of the earliest known winery, the Areni-1 winery, seven months after the world's oldest leather shoe, the Areni-1 shoe, was discovered in the same cave. The winery, which is over six-thousand years old, contains a wine press, fermentation vats, jars, and cups. Archaeologists also found grape seeds and vines of the species Vitis vinifera. Patrick McGovern, a biomolecular anthropologist at the University of Pennsylvania, commenting on the importance of the find, said, "The fact that winemaking was already so well-developed in 4000 BC suggests that the technology probably goes back much earlier."

== Demographics ==
The population dynamics of Areni over the years:

Year	1831	1873	1897	1926	1959	1970	1979	1989	2001	2011
Population	63	294	579	613	1094	1370	1351	1623	1794	1772

== Public facilities ==
There is a secondary school, a hospital, a house of culture and a library in the village.

== Novel ==
In August 2014, a fiction alternative history novel entitled Origins: Discovery was released that featured the village of Arpa (which was renamed Areni in the late 1930s) during the period 1930 until 1952, and the Areni-1 Cave.

== Gallery ==
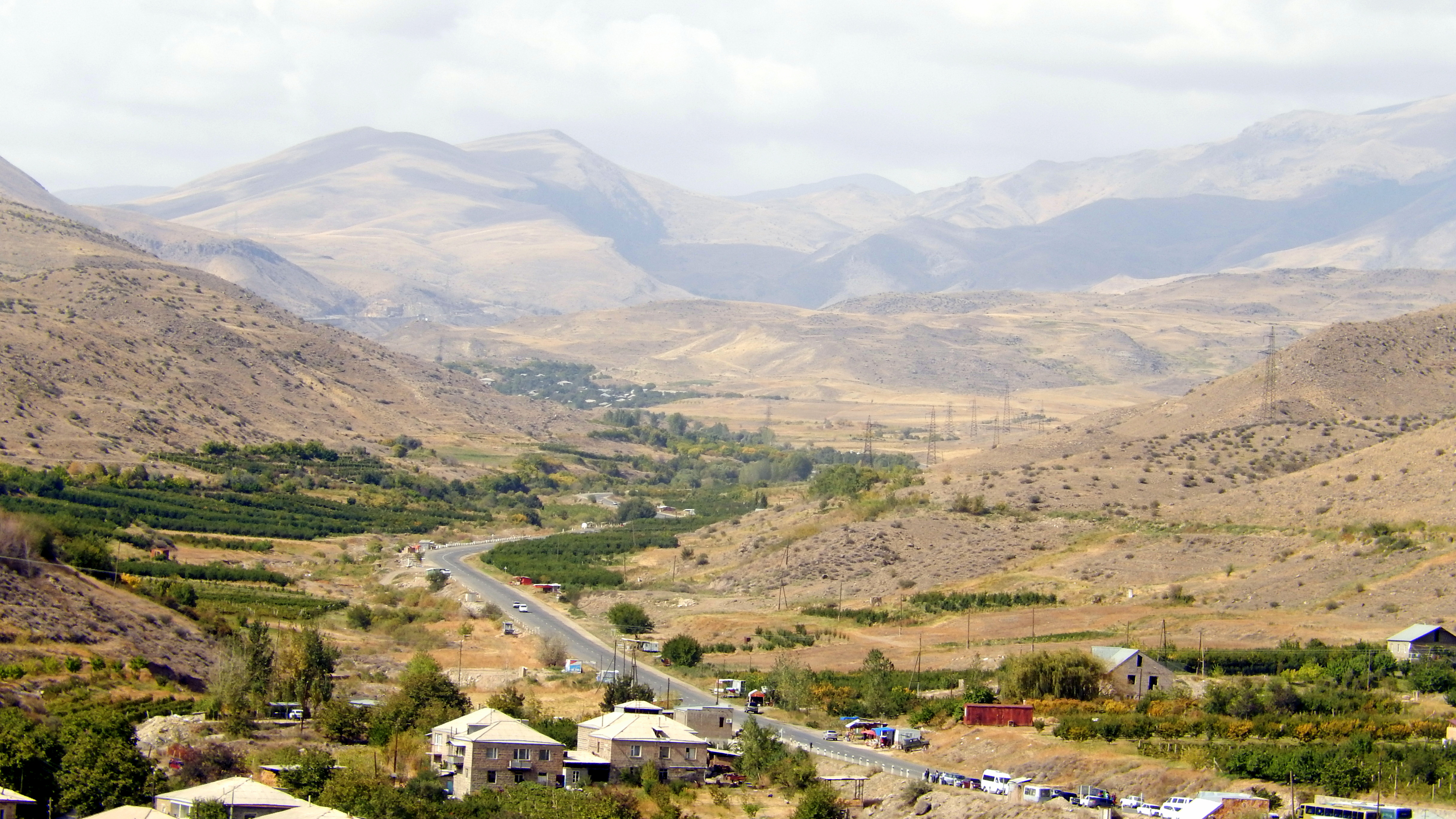
View of Areni

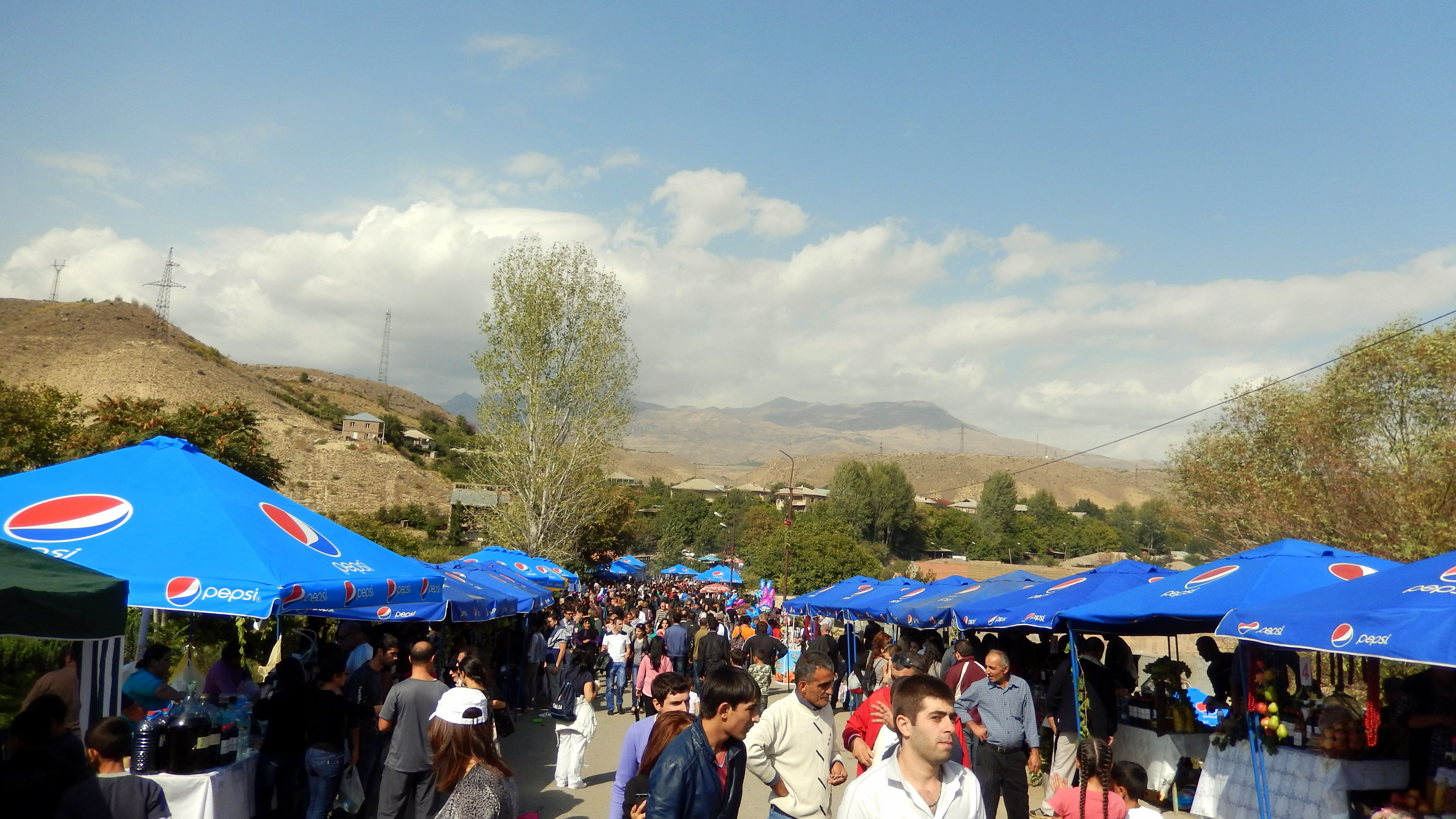
Areni Wine Festival

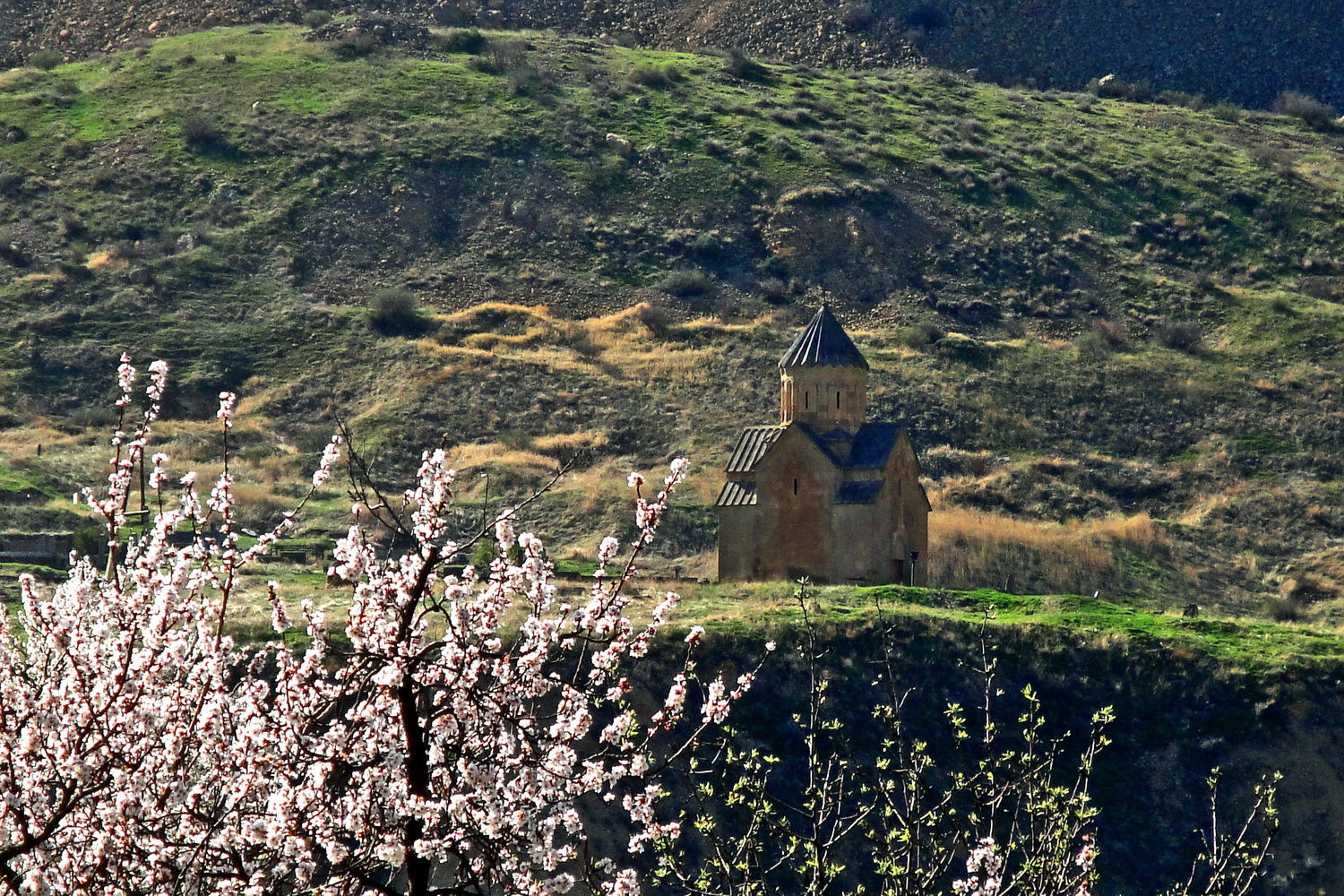
St. Astvatsatsin Church of 1321

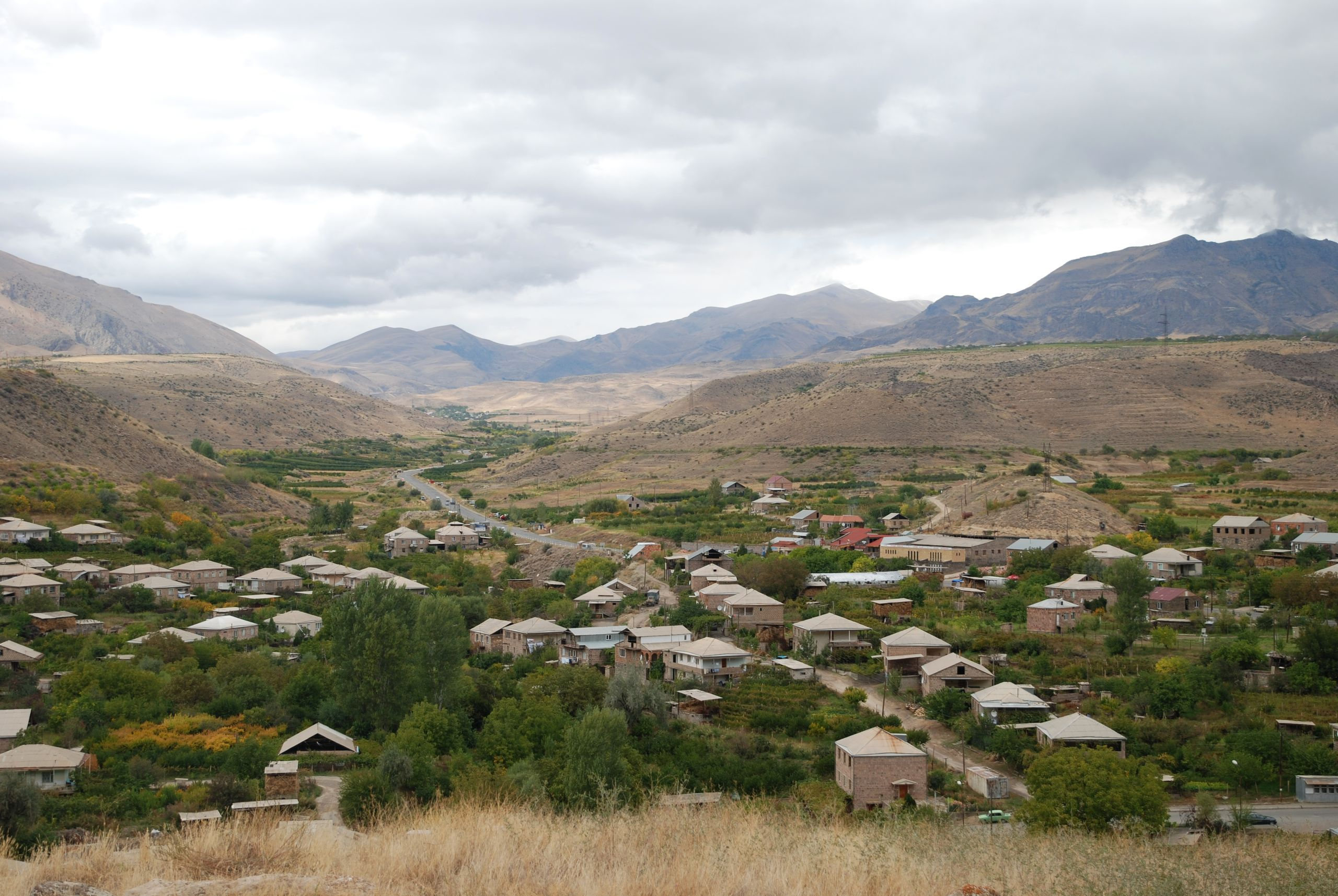
View of Areni

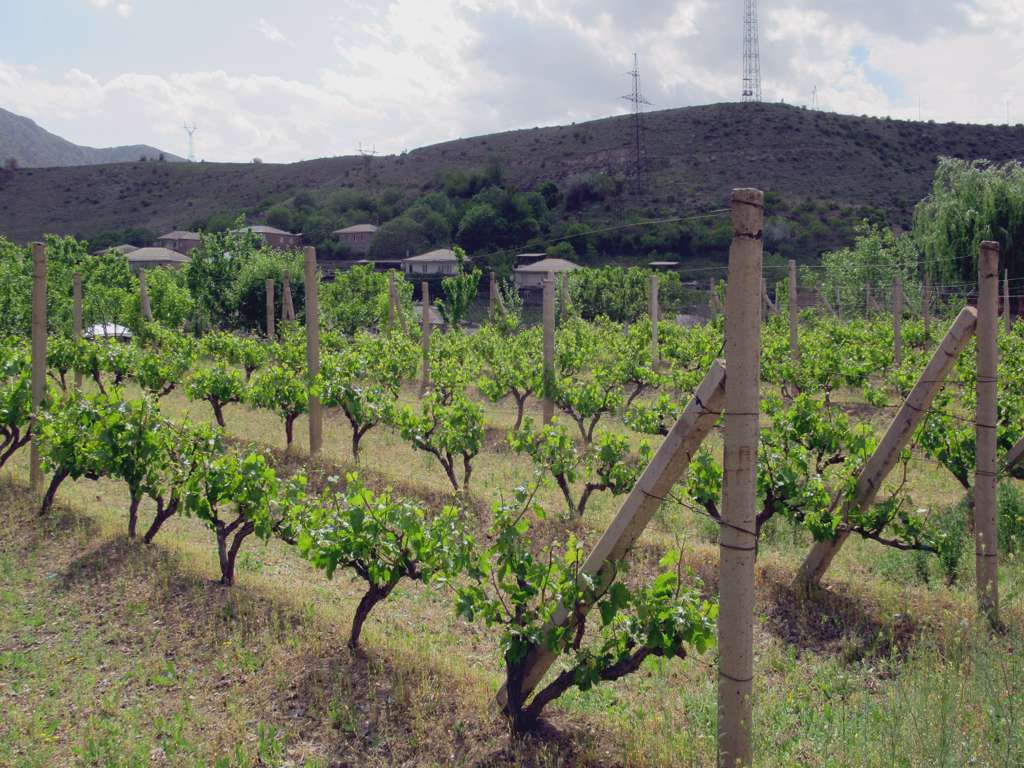
Vineyard in Areni

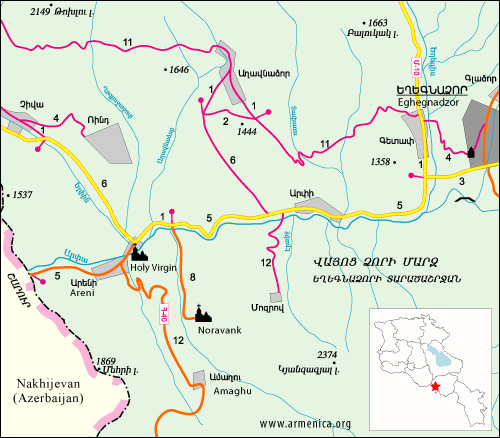
Map of Areni and surrounding region
