= Areni Church =

Church in Armenia

Surb Astvatsatsin Church of Areni Արենիի Սուրբ Աստուածածին եկեղեցի
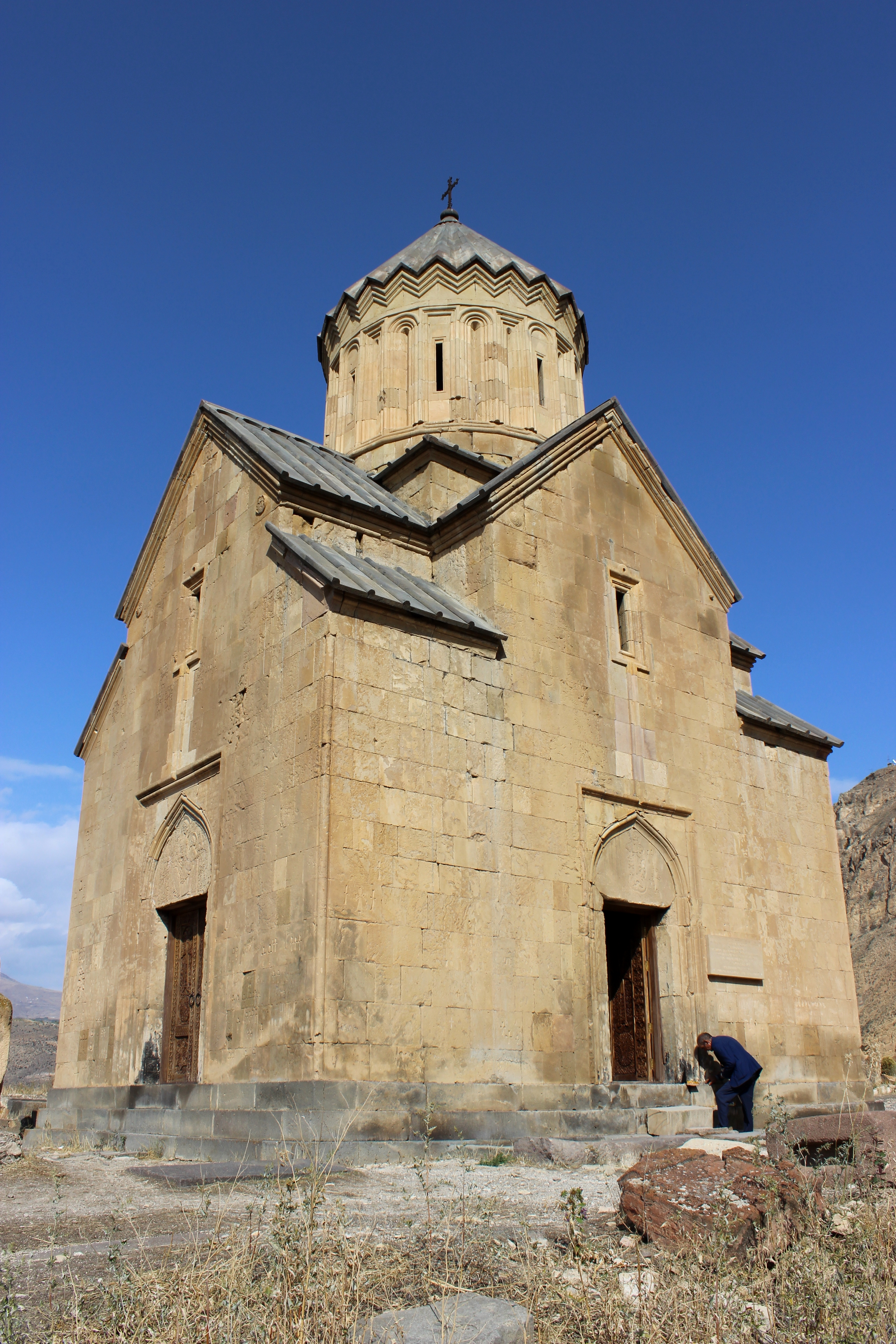
- S. Astvatsatsin Church at Areni (southern and western façades)

- Location within Armenia Location within Vayots Dzor

Religion
- Affiliation: Armenian Apostolic Church
- Region: Caucasus

Location
- Location: Areni, Vayots Dzor Province, Armenia
- Coordinates: 39.72406°N 45.189491°E

Architecture
- Architect: Momik Vardpet
- Type: Armenian; Church
- Style: Domed-hall; single-nave two-aisles
- Groundbreaking: Late 13th-early 14th century
- Completed: 1321
- Dome: 1

Surb Astvatsatsin of Areni (Armenian: Սուրբ Աստուածածին եկեղեցի; meaning the "Holy Mother of God Church"; also Areni Church Armenian: Արենիի եկեղեցի) is a single-nave two-aisled domed church completed in the year 1321. It is located atop a plateau overlooking the Arpa River and the village of Areni in the Vayots Dzor Province of Armenia.

== Architecture ==
S. Astvatsatsin is a domed-hall type church with a single drum and a conical umbrella type dome resting above. Two portals lead into the structure from the south and west. An effigy of the Virgin Mary is carved upon the tympanum in high-relief above the lintel of

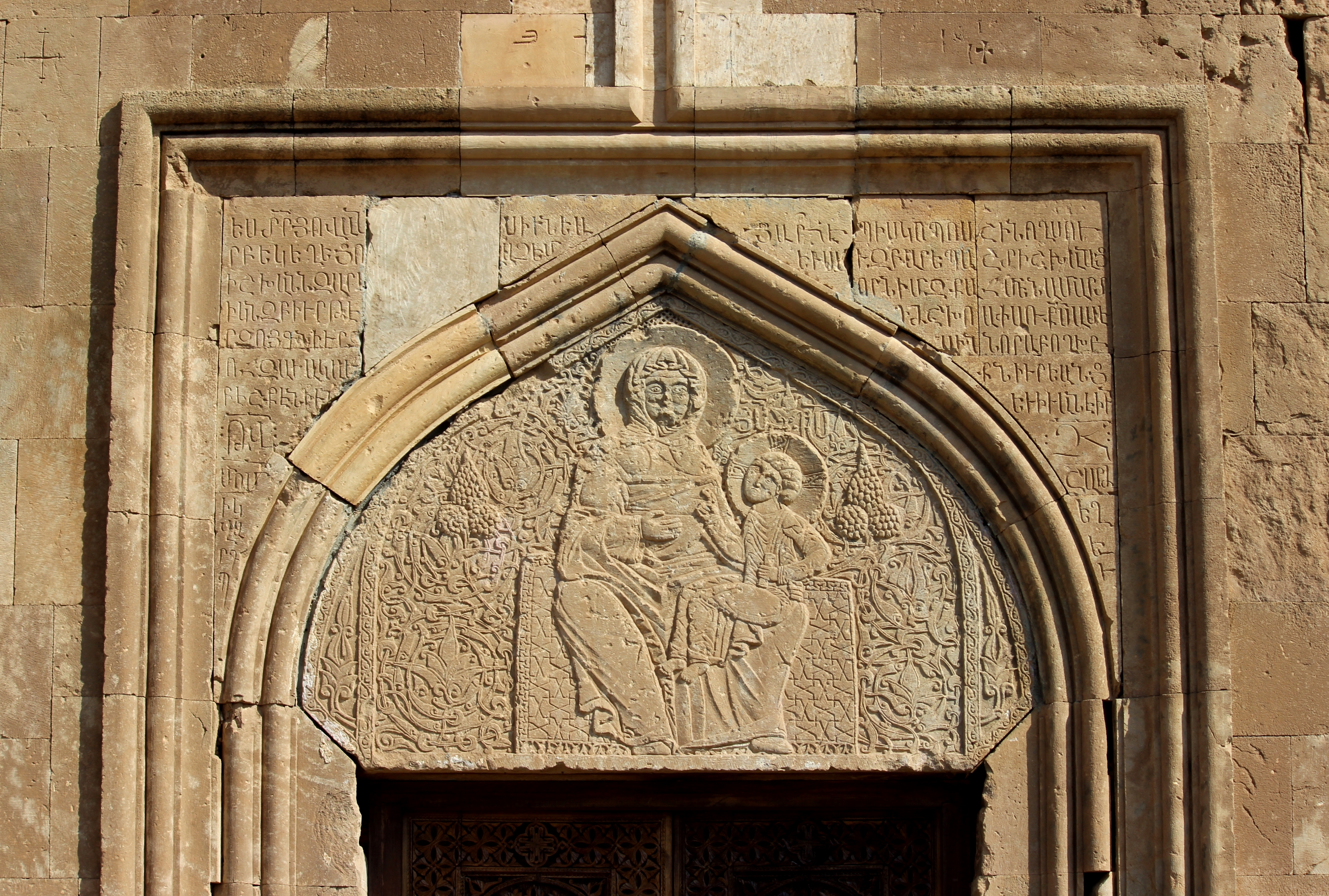
Decorative tympanum above western entry depicting the Virgin Mary and Christ.

the west portal. This carving and many others that may be found on the church are considered to be masterpieces of artwork done by Momik Vardpet, who according to inscriptions was also the architect for the church. He is best known for his high-relief carvings at the monastery of Noravank, located approximately 6 kilometers southeast from Areni. Upon the tympanum above the lintel of the southern portal are the carvings of crosses.

In the center of the church interior, arched pendentives support the drum and dome above. High-relief carvings of mythical creatures adorn each of the four stone panels between the pendentives and base of the drum. Small vertical windows around the drum as well as small windows at each of the four façades let light into the main floor below. A semi-circular apse is located at the eastern wall of the structure and small "studies" or prayer rooms are adjacent on either side. The arched window above the apse is divided by a single column for decorative and structural purposes.

Some interesting tombstones and khachkars may be seen adjacent to the church. Nearby are also the 13th century ruins of lord Tarsaitch Orbelian of Syunik's palace, moved from Yeghegis to Areni during that time. Ruins of a 13th-century bridge built by Bishop Sarkis in 1265-1287 are to the northeast one kilometer. At the same location are the remains of an older bridge.

== Gallery ==
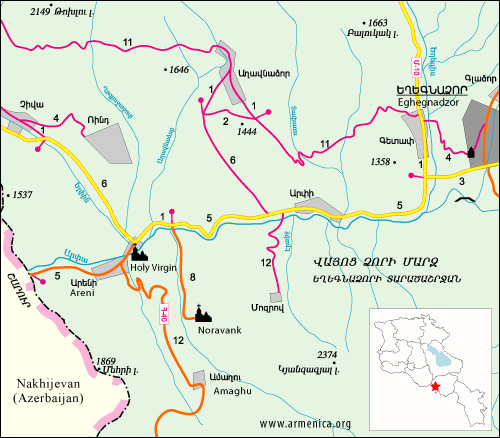
Location of the Areni Church and Noravank.

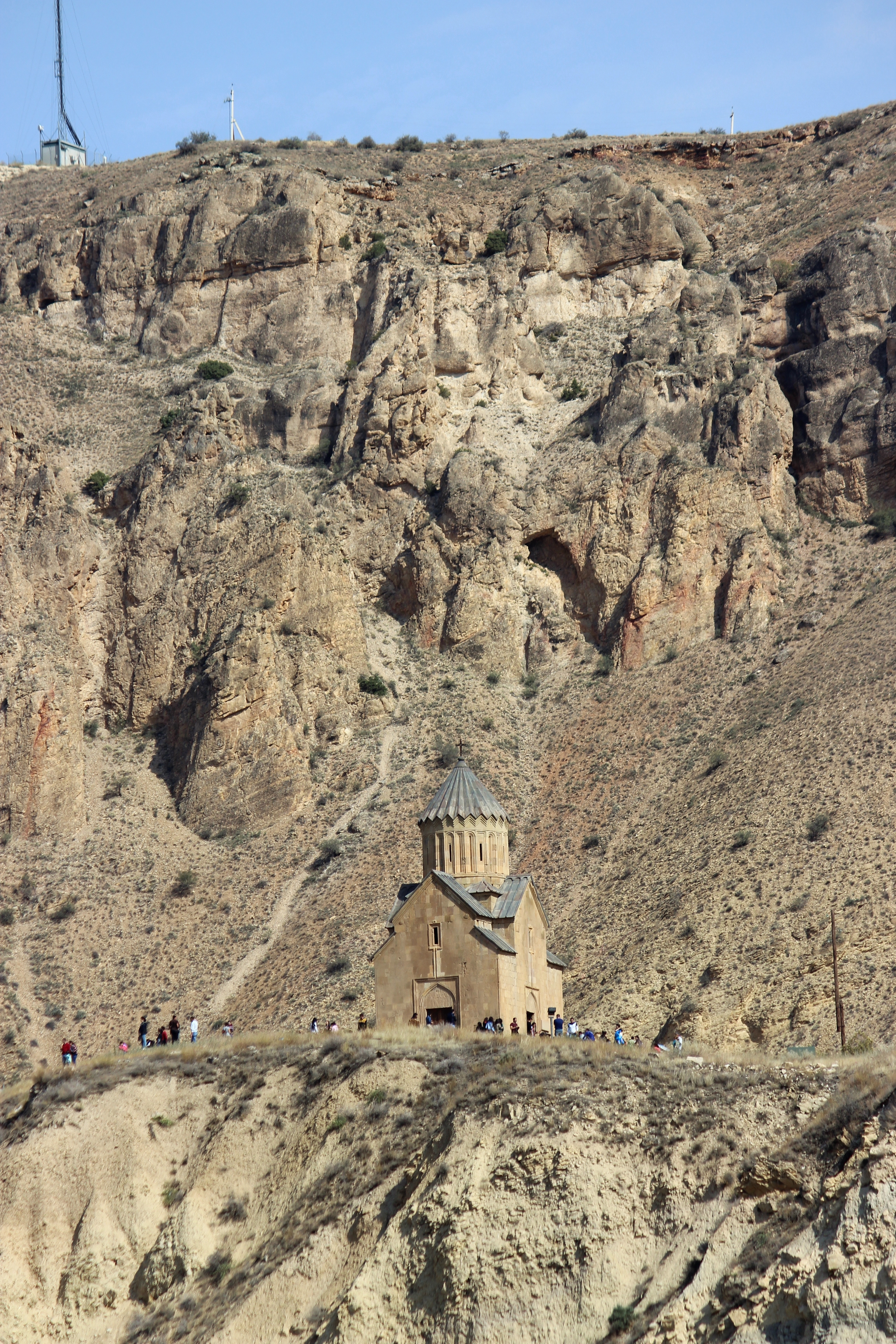
Areni S. Astvatsatsin Church as seen from town during the 2014 Areni Wine Festival.

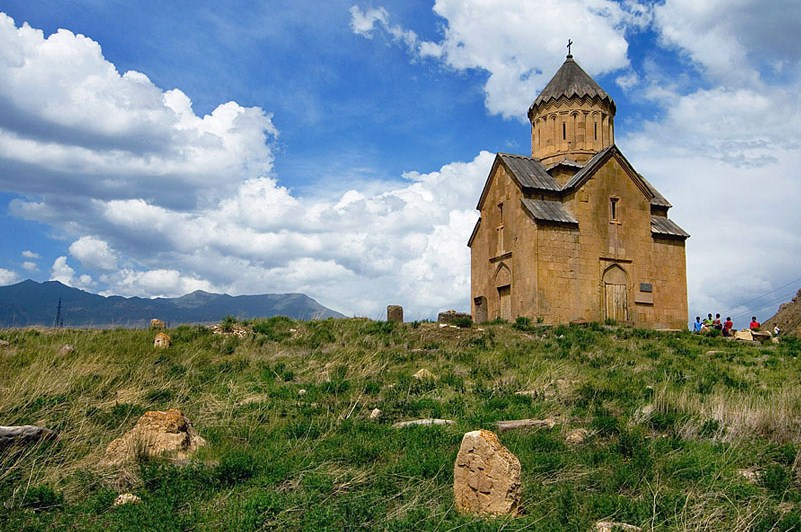
View of the Church with graveyard and khachkars in front.

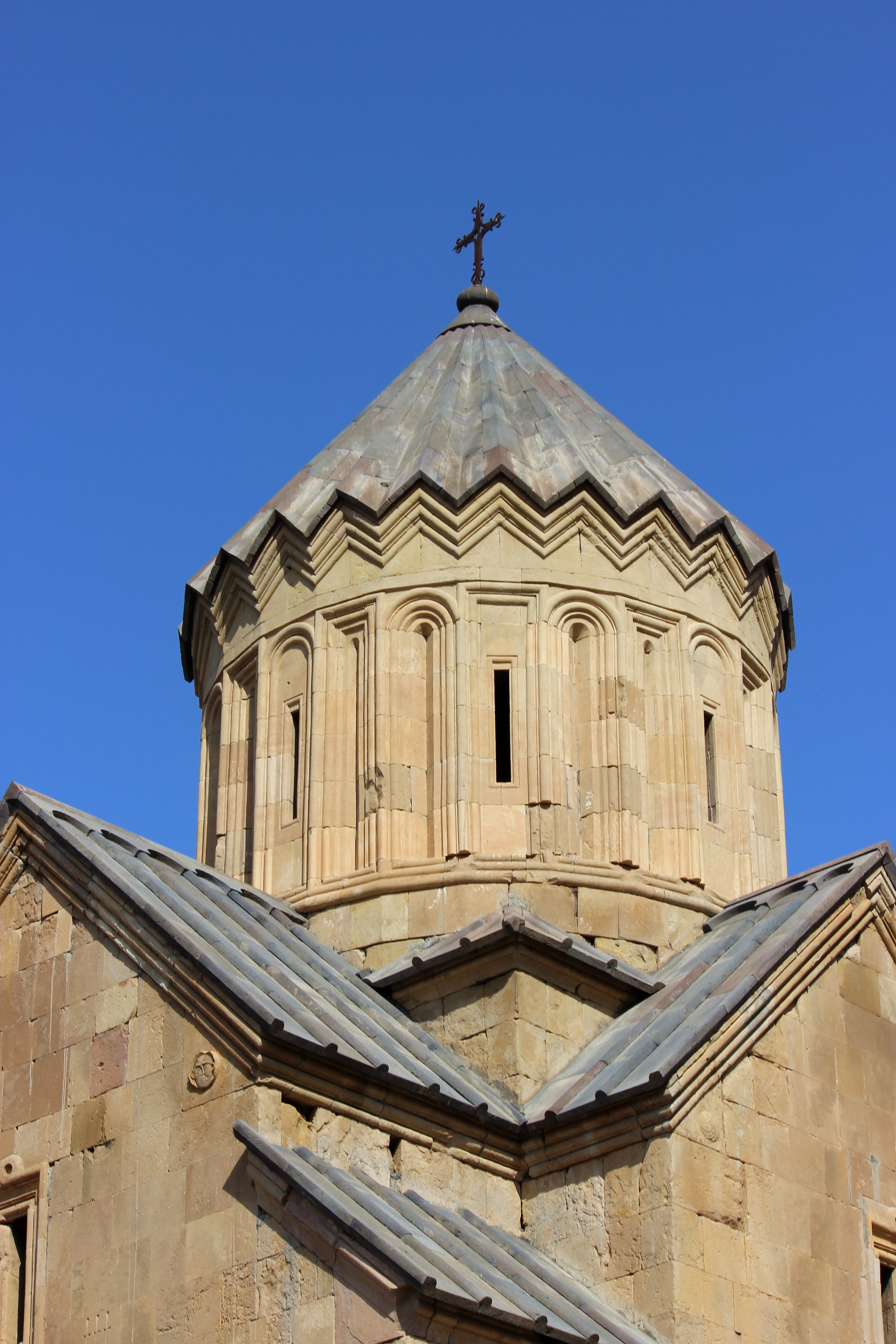
Church drum with a conical umbrella type dome.

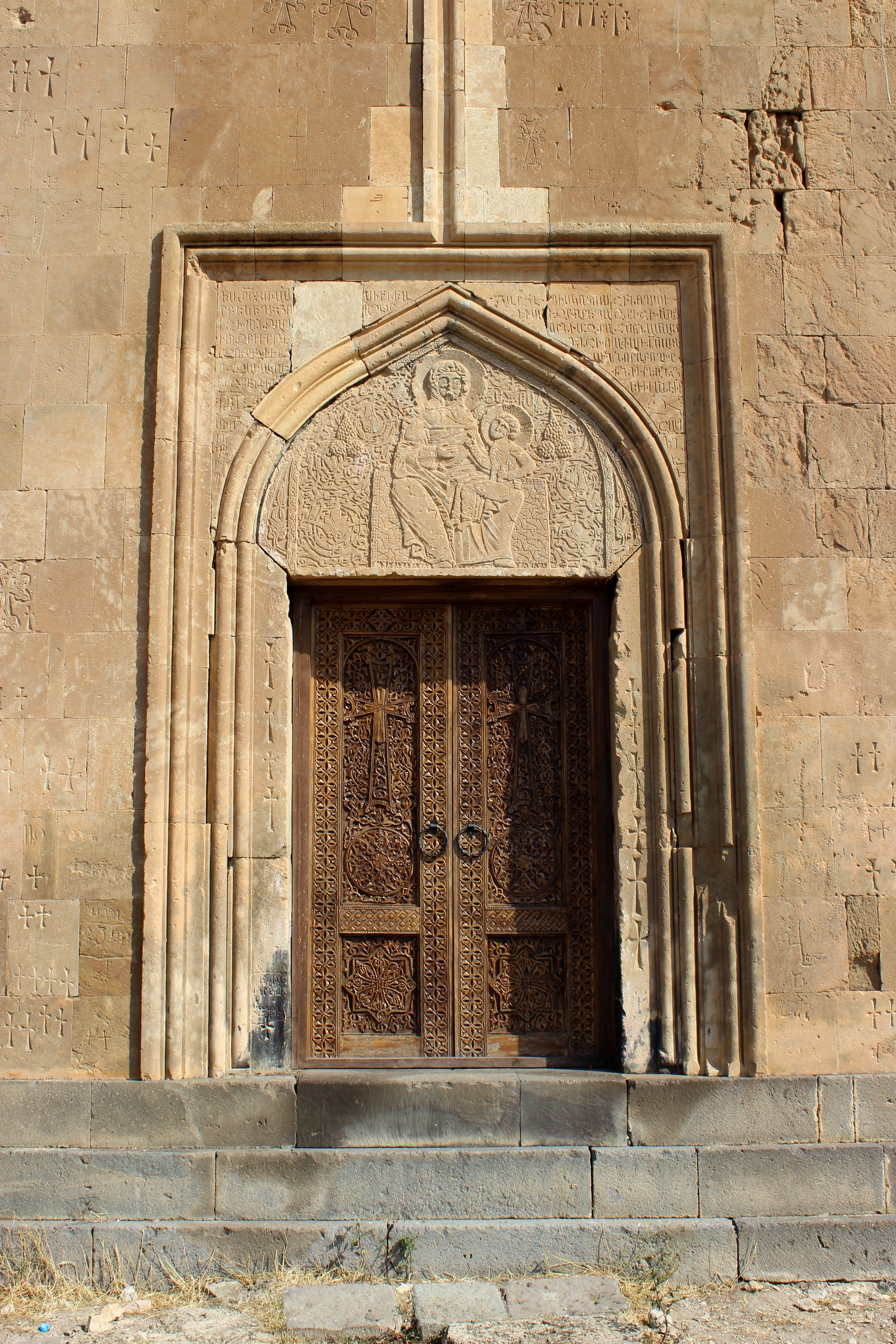
Western portal with a decorative tympanum.

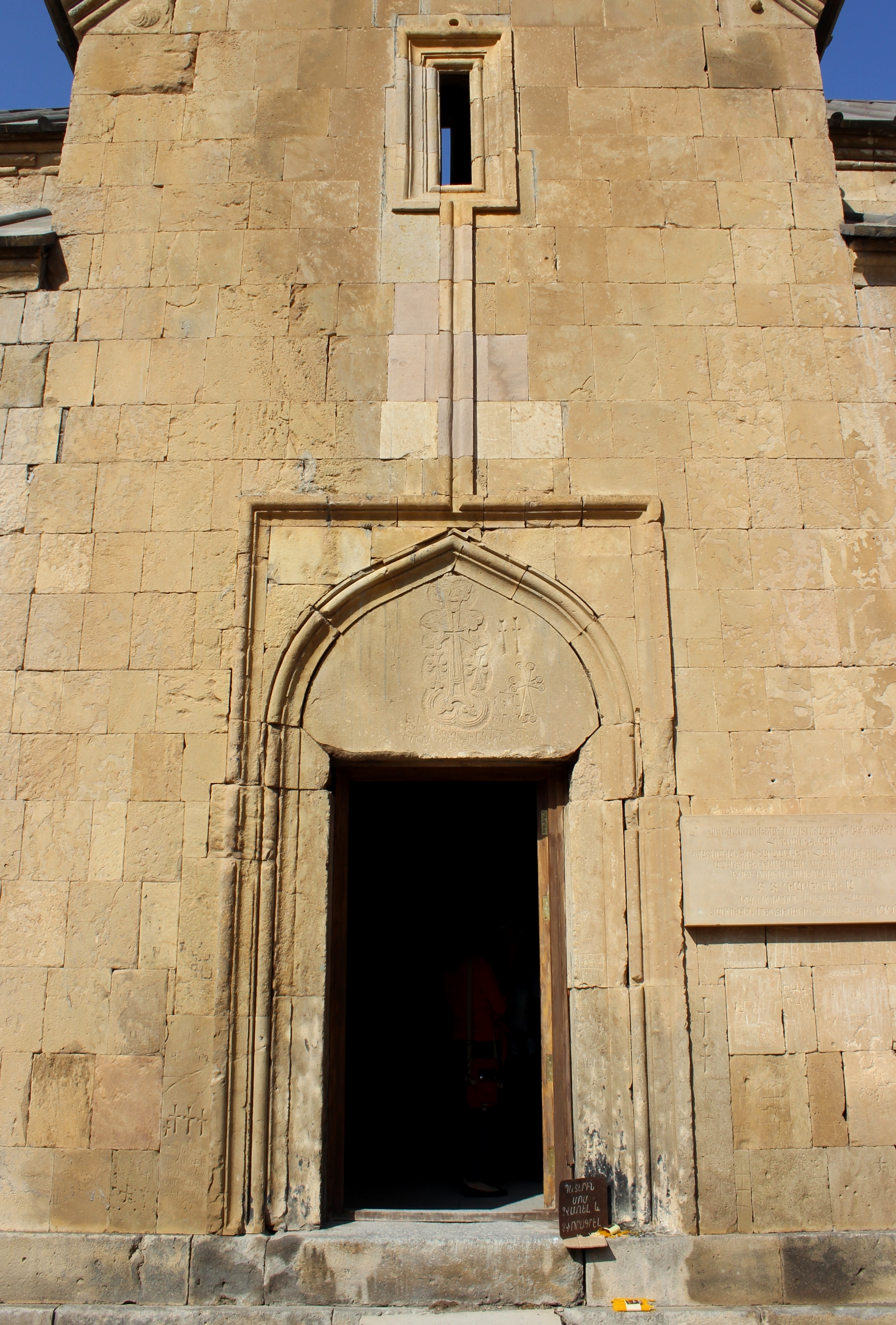
Southern façade and portal to the church.

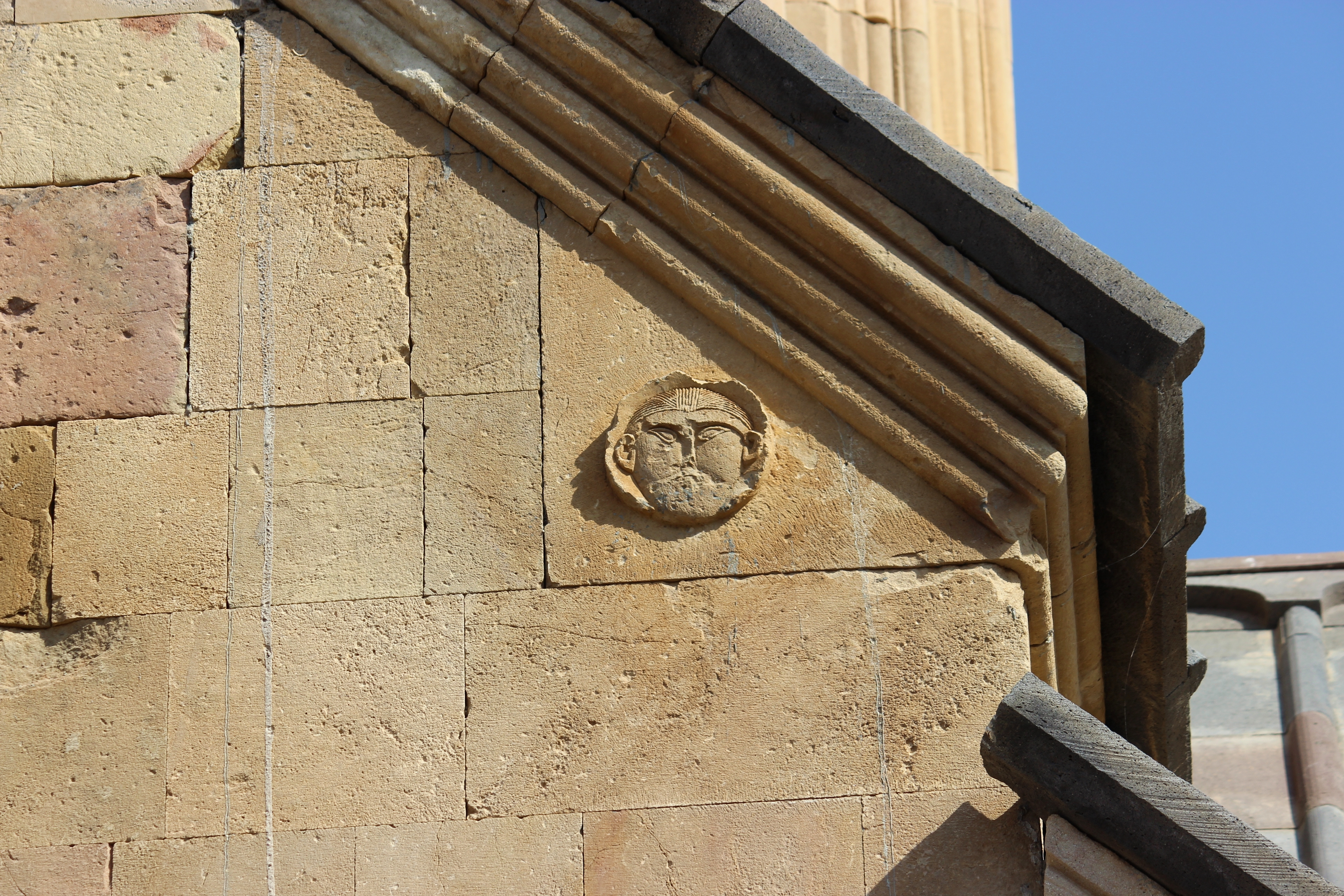
High-relief decoration of a face upon the upper portion of the western façade.

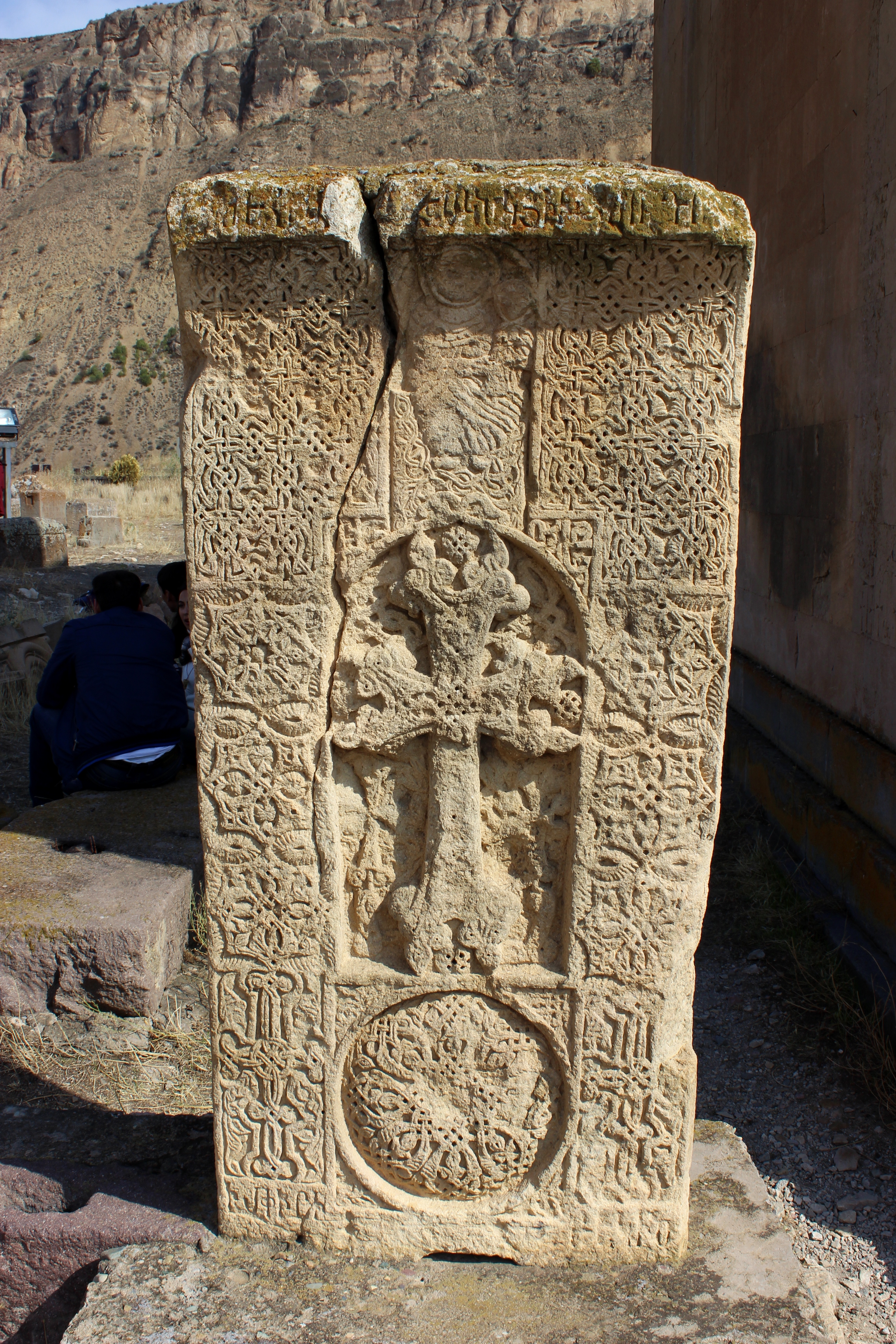
Khachkar adjacent to the western end of the church.

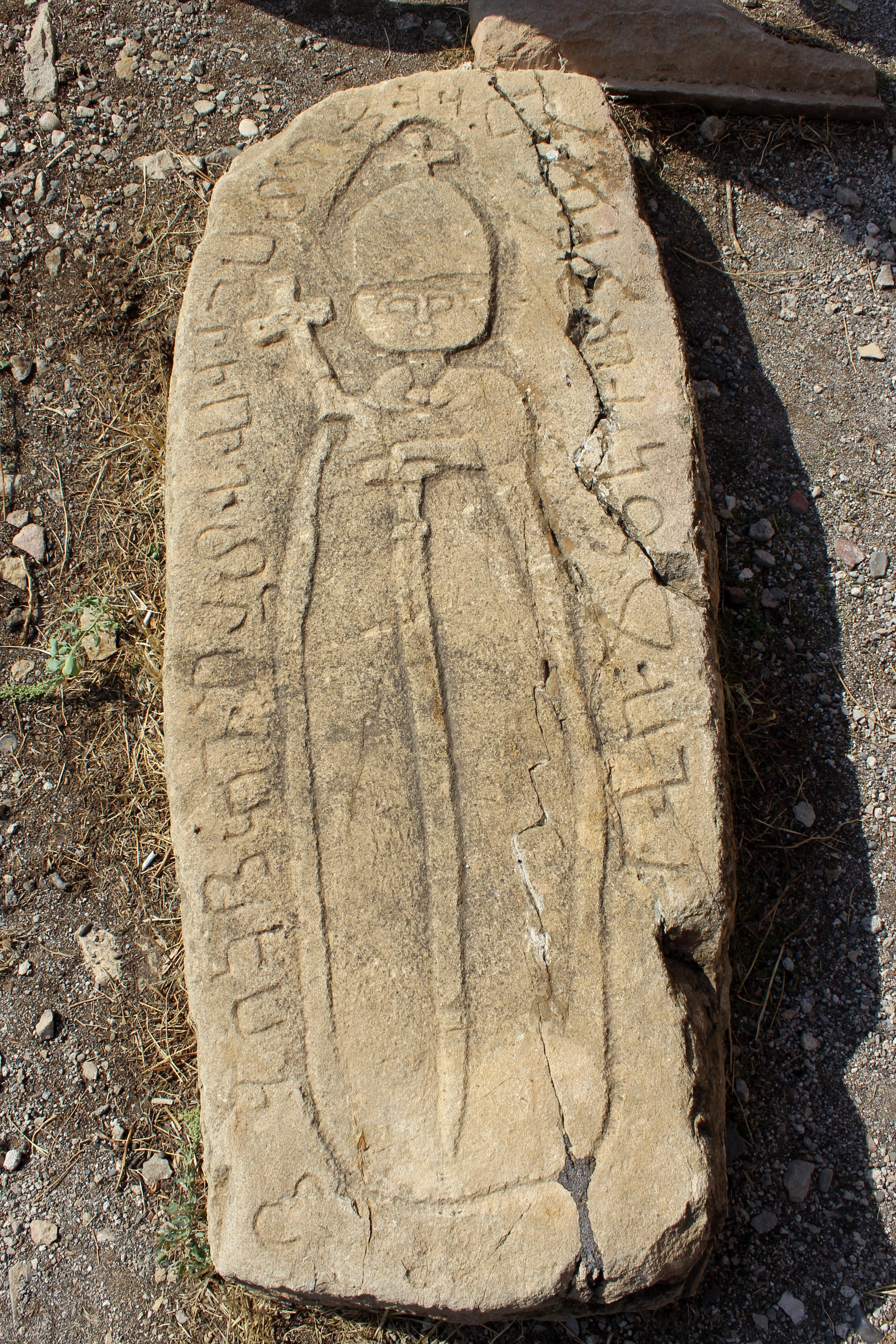
Decorative tombstone depicting a bishop near the southern façade the church.

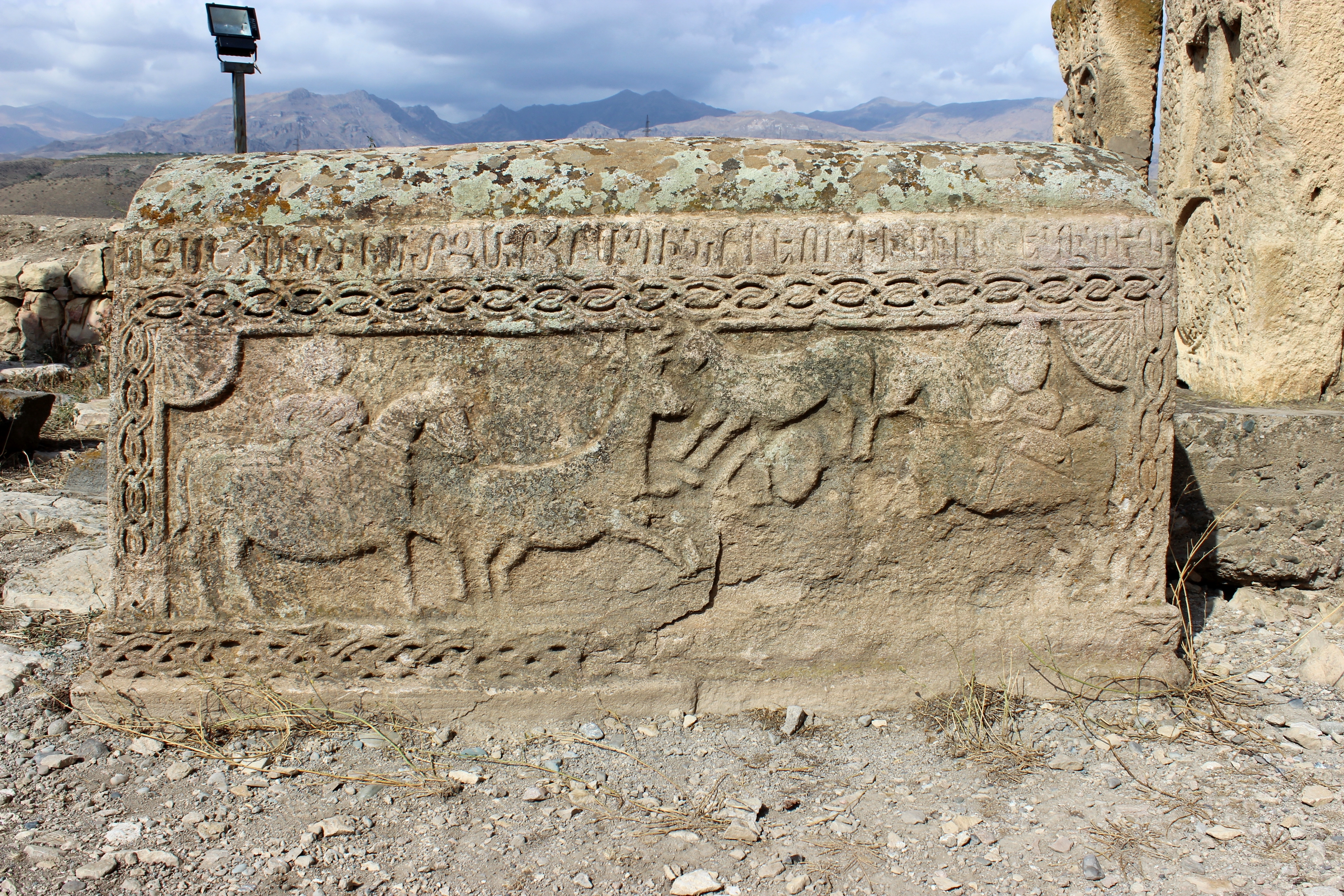
Decorative tombstone depicting a hunting scene adjacent to the western façade of the church.

== See also ==
- Noravank monastery, located southeast of Areni Church.

=== Bibliography ===
- Kiesling, Brady (June 2000). Rediscovering Armenia: An Archaeological/Touristic Gazetteer and Map Set for the Historical Monuments of Armenia (PDF). Archived (PDF) from the original on 6 November 2021.
- Kiesling, Brady (2005), Rediscovering Armenia: Guide, Yerevan, Armenia: Matit Graphic Design Studio
