= Nakhchivan Garrison =

- Azerbaijani: Naxçıvan Hərbi Qarnizonu
- A soldier dining-room of the Separate Combined Arms Army.
- Founded: September 7, 1991
- Country: Azerbaijan
- Branch: Azerbaijani Armed Forces
- Garrison/HQ: Nakhchivan
- Nickname: Nakhchivan Army
- Engagements: First Nagorno-Karabakh War; 2018 Armenian–Azerbaijani clashes; 2020 Nagorno-Karabakh war

Commanders
- Current commander: Karam Mustafayev

The Nakhchivan Garrison (Azerbaijani: Naxçıvan Hərbi Qarnizonu), also referred to as the Nakhchivan Army (Azerbaijani: Naxçıvan Ordusu), formerly known as the 5th Army Corps, is a regional military formation of the Azerbaijani Armed Forces. The structures of all service branches and militarized institution in the territory of the Nakhchivan Autonomous Republic together form the Nakhchivan Garrison. It is currently led by Colonel General Karam Mustafayev.

== History ==
Badge of the former 5th Army Corps

The longtime Soviet Ground Forces garrison in Nakhichevan, Nakhichevan Autonomous Soviet Socialist Republic was the 75th Motor Rifle Division, (ru:75-я мотострелковая дивизия). It was commanded by Colonel (later General-Major) Vasily Shakhnovich (August 1961 – November 1964). In November 1988 Lev Rokhlin became commander of the 75th Motor Rifle Division. In early 1990 the division was transferred to the Soviet Border Troops of the KGB, and Rokhlin was promoted to major-general in February of the same year. The 75th MRD was disbanded in July 1992.

On 7 September 1991, during the intensification of the First Nagorno-Karabakh War, the State Defense Committee (SCC) of the Nakhchivan Autonomous Republic was established by order of the Chairman of the Supreme Soviet Heydar Aliyev. On Independence Day in October 2017, the first garrison military parade was held through the capital in honor of the 25th anniversary of the establishment of the first military unit of the National Army, being attended by the President of Nakhchivan Vasif Talibov and Defense Minister Zakir Hasanov.

== Composition ==
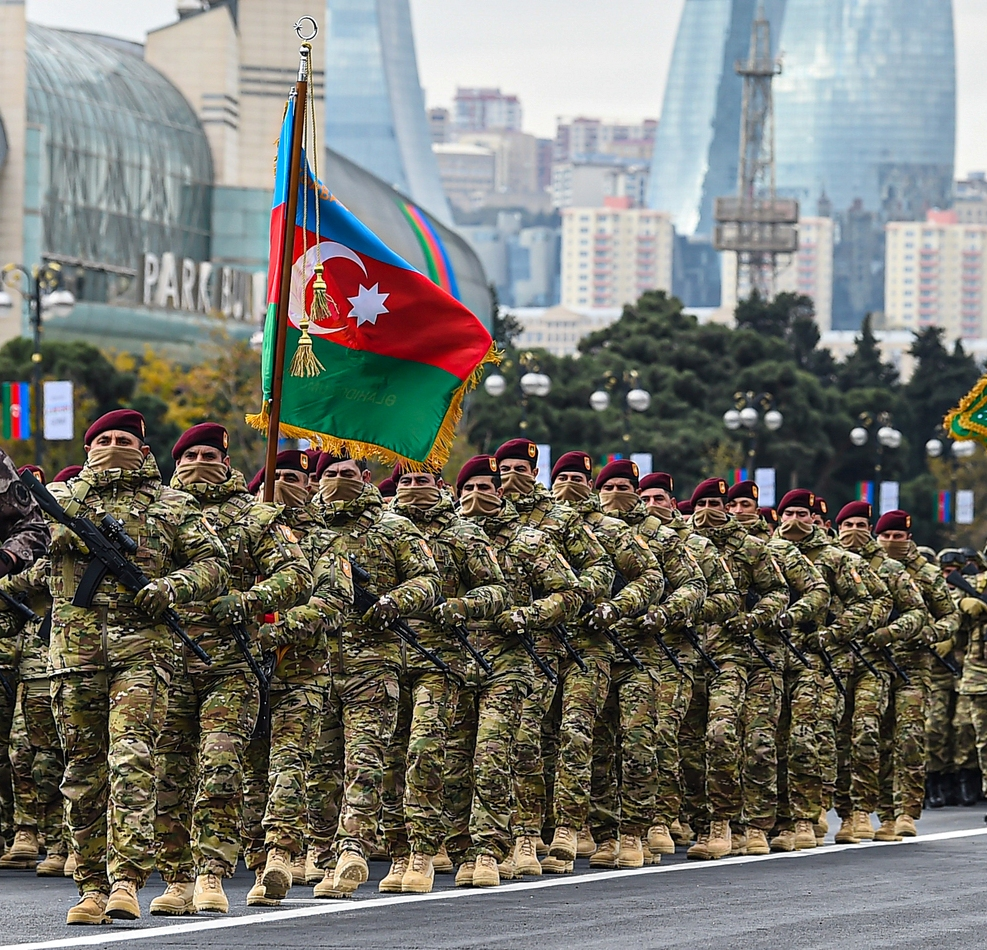
Personnel of the Special Forces of the Nakhchivan Army at the Baku Victory Parade of 2020.

Thousands of personnel are consolidated into the following branches:

- Separate Combined Arms Army/5th Army Corps (Azerbaijani: Naxçıvan Əlahiddə Ümumqoşun Ordusu), the main basis for the garrison.
- Separate Border Division
- Separate Combined Arms Brigade of the Internal Troops
- Ministry of Emergency Situations of the Nakhchivan Autonomous Republic
- State Security Service of the Nakhchivan Autonomous Republic

=== Separate Combined Arms Army/5th Army Corps ===
Over the course of the 1992, the military units of the former Soviet Armed Forces located in the Nakhichevan Autonomous Soviet Socialist Republic of the Azerbaijan SSR were transferred to the SCC. On 19 September, the 705th Motorized Rifle Brigade was established. On 21 June 1995 the 705th Motorized Rifle Brigade was transformed into 705th Motorized Rifle Division, with a corps being created at its base. On 8 December 1998, the 5th Nakhchivan Army Corps was established. The Combined Special General Army was established on the basis of the Army Corps by Ilham Aliyev on 18 December 2013. It maintains a special forces unit and a military aerodrome.

=== Separate Border Division ===
On 22 August 1992, the first border detachment of Azerbaijan was established on the basis of the former 41st Border Detachment of the Transcaucasian Border District of the KGB Border Troops. The detachment previously guarded the Soviet-Iranian and Soviet-Turkish borders. President Ilham Aliyev ordered in early 2004 that the Nakhchivan Border Detachment was to be transformed into the “Nakhchivan” Border Division.

=== Combined Arms Brigade of the Internal Troops ===
Two months prior to the formation of the 705th division, on 10 April 1995, the Nakhchivan "N" Battalion of the Internal Troops was established, being upgraded to a regiment in 2002. In 2014, the Nakhchivan Special Operations Brigade of the Internal Troops was established.

=== Ministry of Emergency Situations ===
The Ministry of Emergency Situations of the Nakhchivan Autonomous Republic is an executive authority that ensures the prevention of natural disasters, man-made accidents and fires in the Nakhchivan Autonomous Republic. It is an affiliate of the Ministry of Emergency Situations of Azerbaijan.

=== State Security Service ===
The special services of Nakhchivan operated under the People's Commissariat of Internal Affairs of the Nakhchivan Autonomous Soviet Socialist Republic until 1941. In accordance with the reforms carried out in this area in the USSR, this commissariat was divided by the decree of the Presidium of the Supreme Soviet in April 1941, and separate People's State Commissariats were established on its basis. In 1946, the People's State Security Commissariat was renamed the State Security Committee of the Nakhchivan ASSR and functioned for 8 years with this status. Later, this committee would become the independent KGB of the Nakhchivan ASSR, under the auspices of the Nakhchivan Regional Committee of the Communist Party of Azerbaijan. The geographical position of the Nakhchivan ASSR, with its borders with Iran and Turkey, made its KGB one of the most important during the Soviet era. The Ministry of National Security was established on the basis of Resolution No. 199-XII on 20 September 1992, adopted by the Supreme Assembly of Nakhchivan under the chairmanship of Heydar Aliyev. On 14 December 2015, the modern State Security Service was established on the basis of the Ministry of National Security.

== Training ==
The garrison regularly undergoes extensive training, often in the presence of the military leadership. In accordance with a combat for 2020, the garrison launched command-staff exercises in May of 2020. Personnel took part in the Azerbaijan-Turkey joint tactical shooting exercise "Unshakable Brotherhood-2019" held in Nakhchivan from 7-11 June 2019.

=== Training Center ===
The Combined Army Training and Educational Center was opened in May 2018. It is designed to specifically train members of the garrison. It features dormitories, a housing complex, a hospital, parade ground, and a sports campus. The central three-storey building occupies a total area of 7,500 square metres.

== Institutions ==
=== Military court ===
The Military Court of the Nakhchivan Autonomous Republic was established on 27 May 1992 on the basis of the Military Tribunal of the Nakhchivan Garrison. This court, functioning in its current name since 1 June 2000, was until June 2007 the institution with the power to consider cases as a court of first instance. Since June 16, 2007, the Military Court of the Nakhchivan Autonomous Republic began to perform the functions of the Military Court of the Azerbaijan Republic in grave crime cases. In August 2010, the following territorial districts came under the jurisdiction of the Military Court:

- Babek District
- Nakhchivan (city)
- Julfa District
- Kangarli District
- Ordubad District
- Sadarak District
- Shahbuz District
- Sharur District

=== Central Hospital ===
It was opened on 10 May 2021.

== See also ==
- 5th Army Corps (Armenia)
- Tashkent Military District
- Kiev Military District
