= Günnüt =

Günnüt/ Genut
- Coordinates: 39°46′27″N 45°02′53″E
- Country: Armenia (De facto)/ Azerbaijan (De jure)
- Autonomous republic/ Province: Ararat/ Nakhchivan
- District: Sharur

Günnüt, or Genut (Գենուտ), (Gunnut or Gyunnyut or Gyunnyut-Dzhafarli) is a village in the Sharur District of Nakhchivan Autonomous Republic, Azerbaijan. It is currently De facto owned by Armenia, and administered as part of its Ararat province. https://news.am/eng/news/456193.html. It is located in the right side of the Nakhchivan-Sadarak highway, 22 km away from the district center, on the plain.

== Etymology ==
Its previous name was Günnüt Cəfərli (Gyunnyut Dzhafarli). The settlement was built in the place called Günnüt by the families belonging to Jafarli generation. In the Toponomy the word of günnüt means "meadow, plain," but as a distorted form of günnük word, it means "place which the sun hits", "last spring greens, autumn pasture". According to some researchers, this name is related with the name of the günnüt tribe which came to Nakhchivan among the Mongols.

== 2018 Armenian-Azerbaijani clashes ==
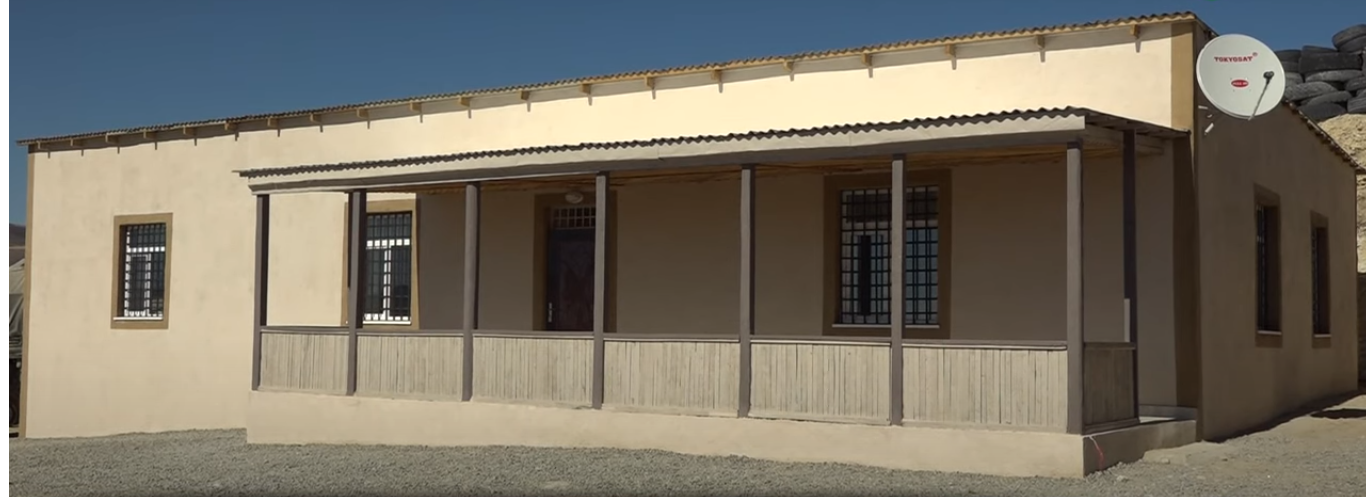
Azerbaijani army built military post in Gunnut after 2018-clashes

Military clashes took place near the village of Günnüt and surrounding heights between Armenian and Azerbaijani forces during May 20–27, 2018. Military conflict between the Azerbaijani and Armenian Armed Forces, which took place on May 20–27, 2018. The Azerbaijani Armed Forces claimed to have advanced their positions during the clashes, although this was denied by the Armenian side and met with skepticism by Eurasianet. Günnüt is currently owned by Armenia as Azerbaijanis after the clashes got permission from the Armenian government if they can go visit the graves there. https://news.am/eng/news/456193.html.
