= Qıraq Kəsəmən =

- Municipality
- Location within Azerbaijan
- Coordinates: 41°13′09″N 45°29′22″E
- Country: Azerbaijan
- Rayon: Agstafa

Population
  - Total: 1,880
- Time zone: UTC+4 (AZT)
  - Summer (DST): UTC+5 (AZT)

Qıraq Kəsəmən (also, Ashaga Kyrakhkesaman, Krakhkesaman, and Kyrakh Kesaman) is a village and municipality in the Agstafa Rayon of Azerbaijan. It has a population of 1,880. The current location of the village is what was once known as Təzə Qəsəmənli ('new Kesemen'), the location to which the population was moved following Soviet plans for a (never completed) dam.
