= Getap, Vayots Dzor =

Getap Գետափ
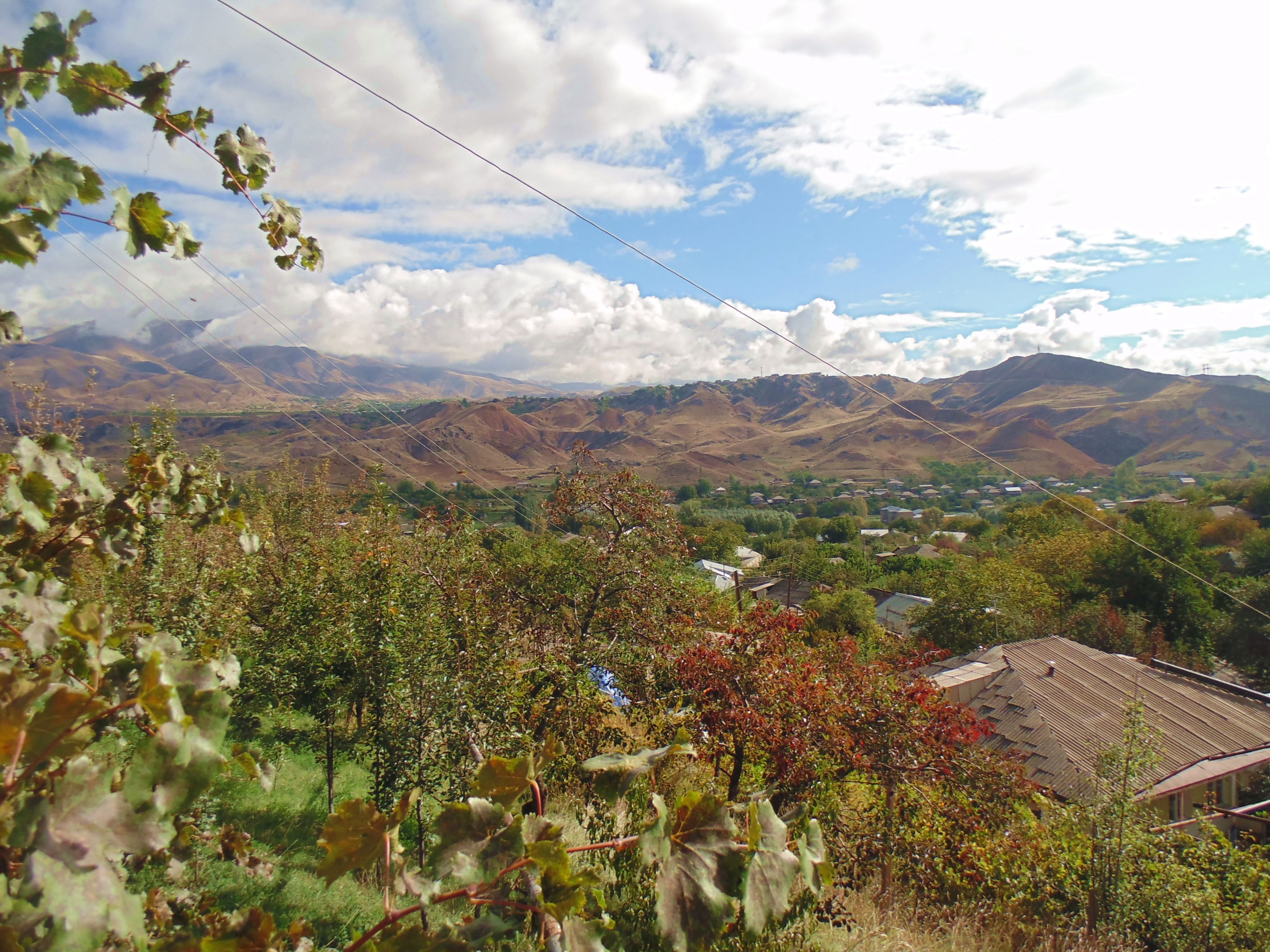

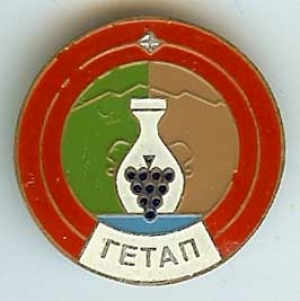
- Coat of arms

- Location within Armenia Location within Vayots Dzor
- Coordinates: 39°45′49″N 45°18′22″E
- Country: Armenia
- Province: Vayots Dzor
- Municipality: Yeghegnadzor

Population (2011)
  - Total: 1,981
- Time zone: UTC+4 (AMT)

Getap (Armenian: Գետափ) is a village in the Yeghegnadzor Municipality of the Vayots Dzor Province in Armenia. It is located approximately 1–2 kilometers to the west of the provincial center, nestled along the lower stretches of the Yeghegis River. This village has gained recognition for its wine-making tradition and was officially renamed Getap on 1 January 1935.

== Etymology ==
The village was previously known as Koytur.

== History ==
The village was founded in 1828 by Armenians who migrated from Salmast gavar in Persia.

== Geography ==
Situated at an elevation of 1310 meters above sea level, the village is nestled amidst mountainous terrain and extends along the left side of the Yerevan-Meghri highway. Its administrative territory spans 1977 hectares. The village lies just 1–2 kilometers away from the Province center and is approximately 119 kilometers from Yerevan. Within the village, there are 780 households accommodating a population of 2385 residents. The village has 780 households and 2385 inhabitants. There are 450 private houses and 8 two-floor residential buildings in the village, with a total area of 39,044 square meters.

== Climate ==
The village experiences a dry climate characterized by moderately cold but relatively short winters, followed by warm and extended springs. Summers are hot, and autumn maintains a warm temperature. The constant non-precipitating weather predominates.

== Population ==
According to the RA 2011 census results, Getap had a recorded permanent population of 1981 individuals, with a current population of 1726. Since its establishment, the village has been inhabited by Armenians, whose ancestors migrated from Salmast in 1828–1830.

The population dynamics of Getap over the years:

Year	1831	1873	1897	1926	1939	1959	1976	1979	1989	2001	2011
Population	201	478	771	765	1112	1160	1528	1504	1980	1980	1981

== Occupation ==
The primary occupations of the village involve horticulture, tobacco cultivation, animal husbandry, and arable farming. A significant 75% of the population is actively involved in agricultural activities, which encompass the cultivation of crops such as wheat, barley, Vegetables, and grapes. 153 hectares of the village's arable lands are irrigated.

The village is home to the Getap wine factory.

== Historical and cultural sites ==
At the beginning of the 20th century, the ancient Getap church was still standing, but today, it has been replaced by a spring monument. About 2 km to the northeast of the village, the remnants of the "Gomavank" church can be found, which bear ancient inscriptions.

== Public facilities ==
There is a school, a house of culture, a kindergarten, and a medical station in the village.

== Gallery ==
Scenery around Getap

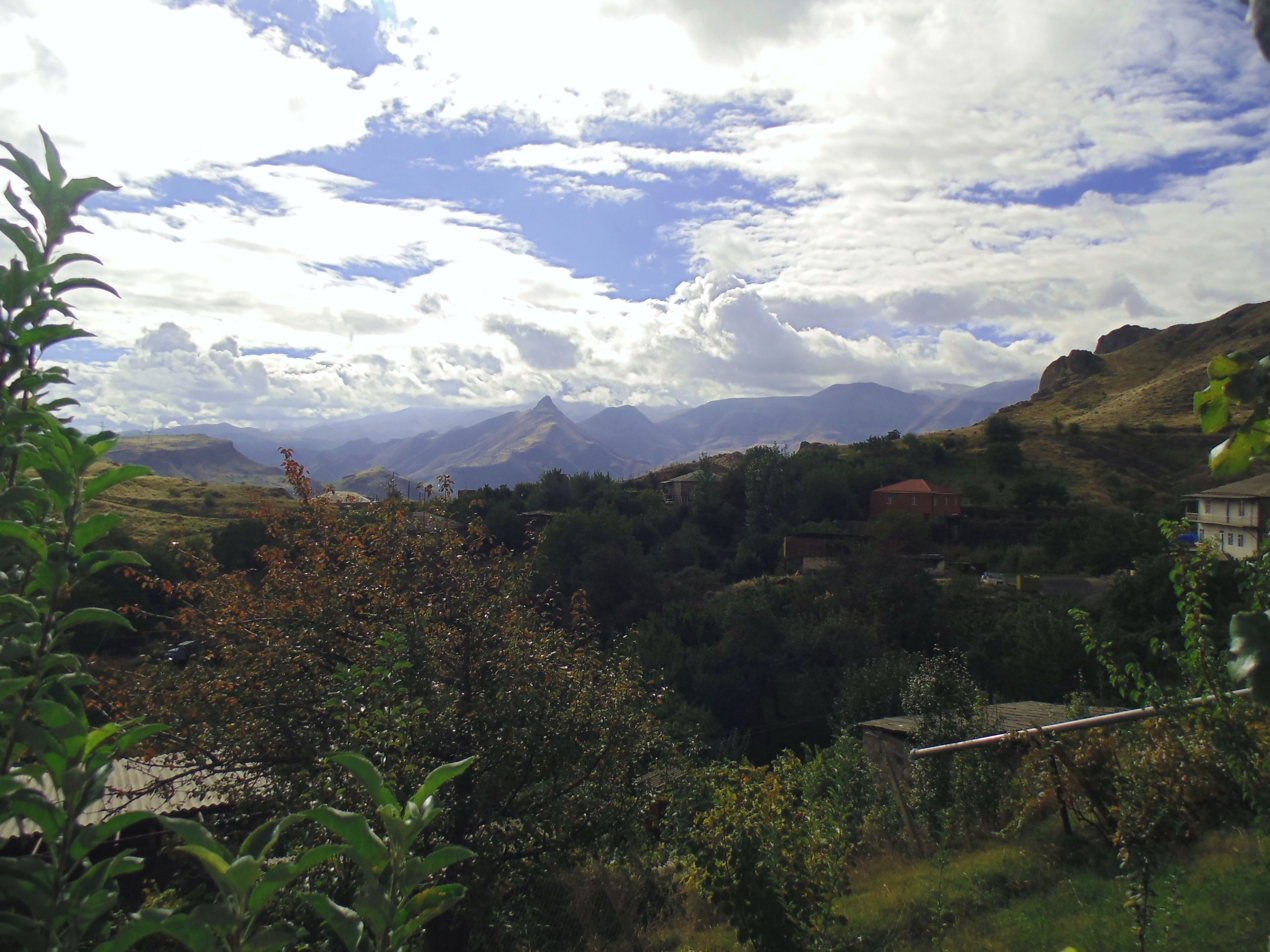

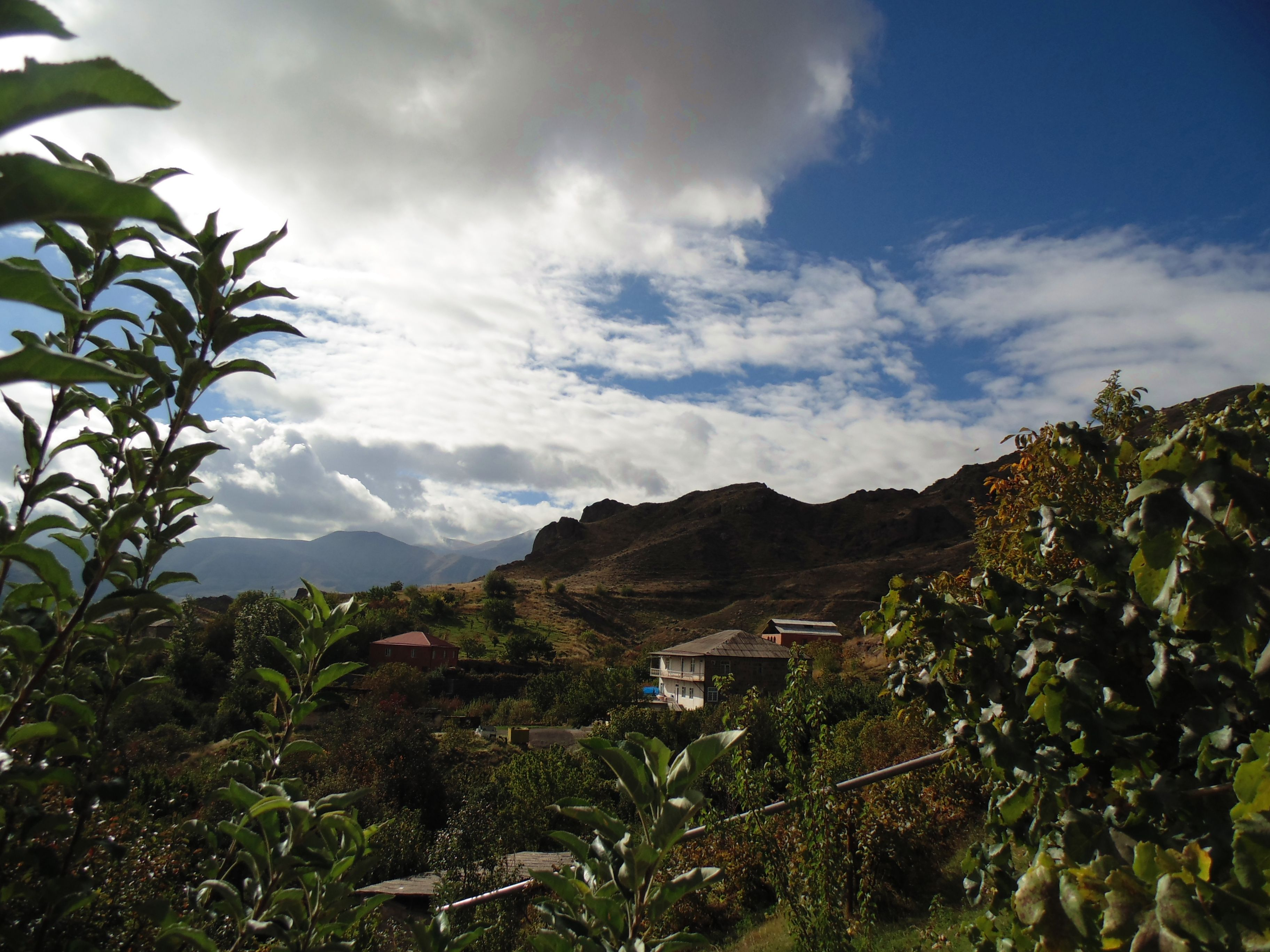

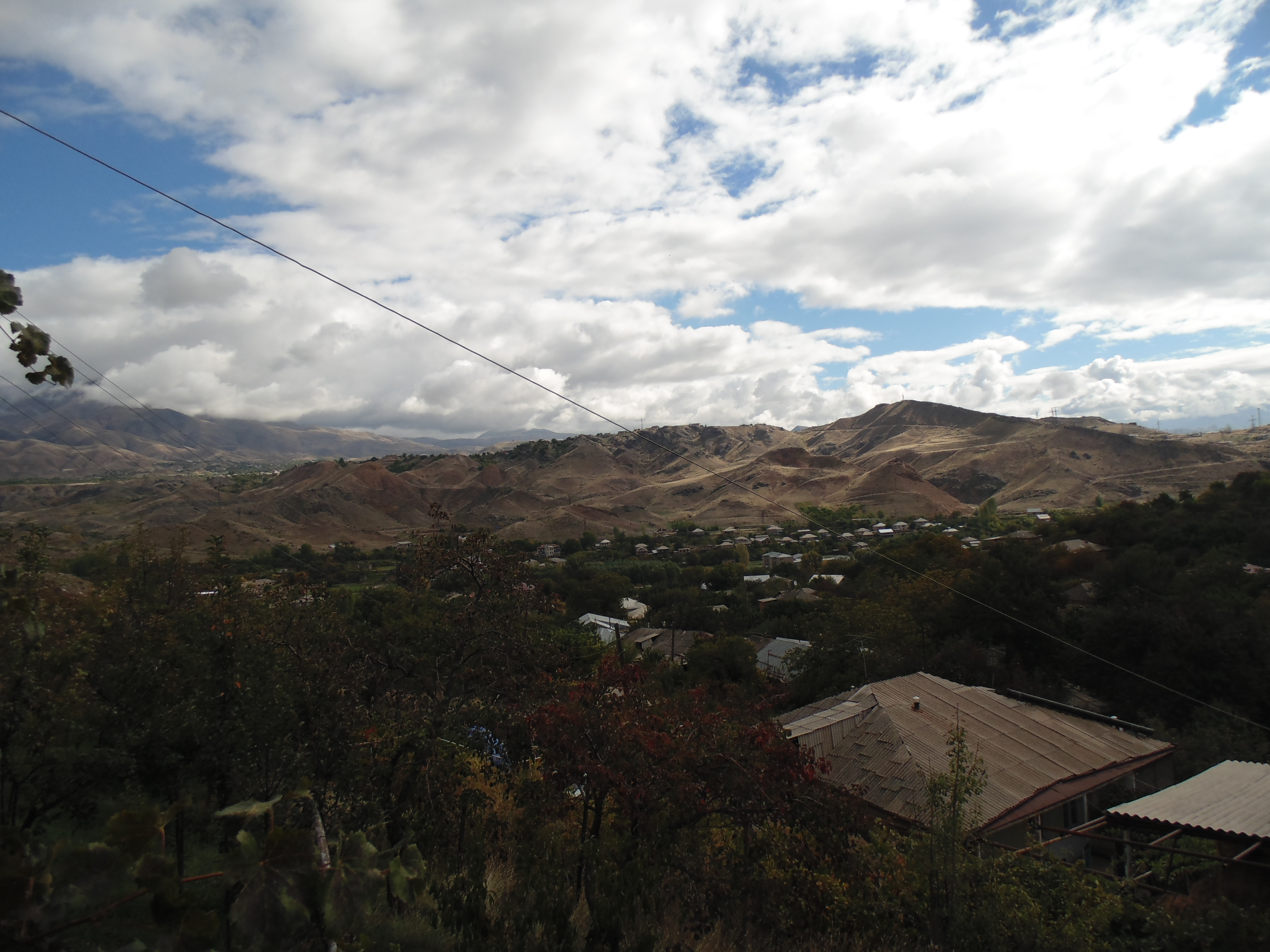

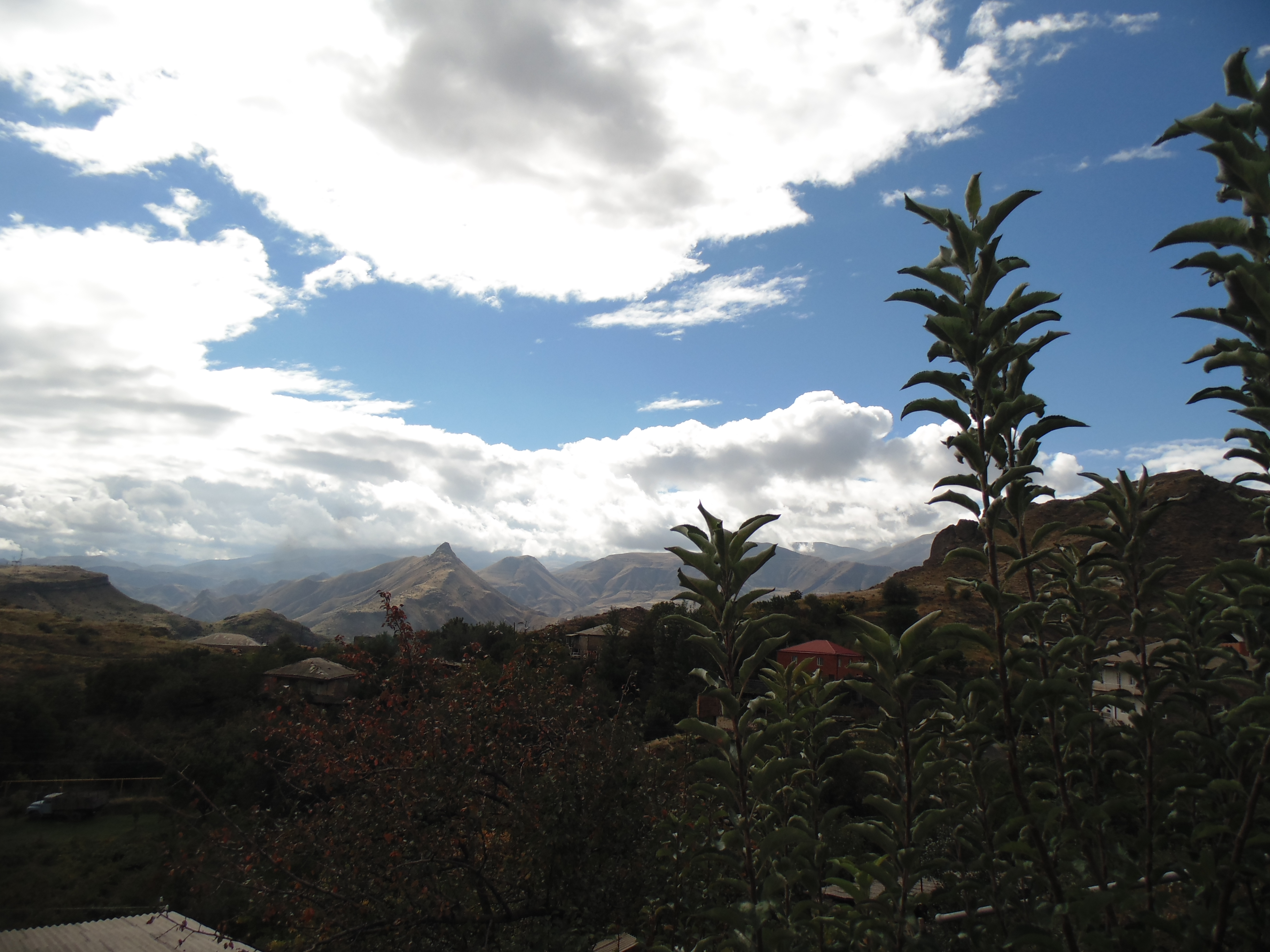
