= Keshishkend =

Keshishkend or Keshishkent may refer to:

- Gegharot, Armenia
- Yeghegnadzor, Armenia
- Keşişkənd, Azerbaijan
