= Gladzor =

Gladzor Գլաձոր
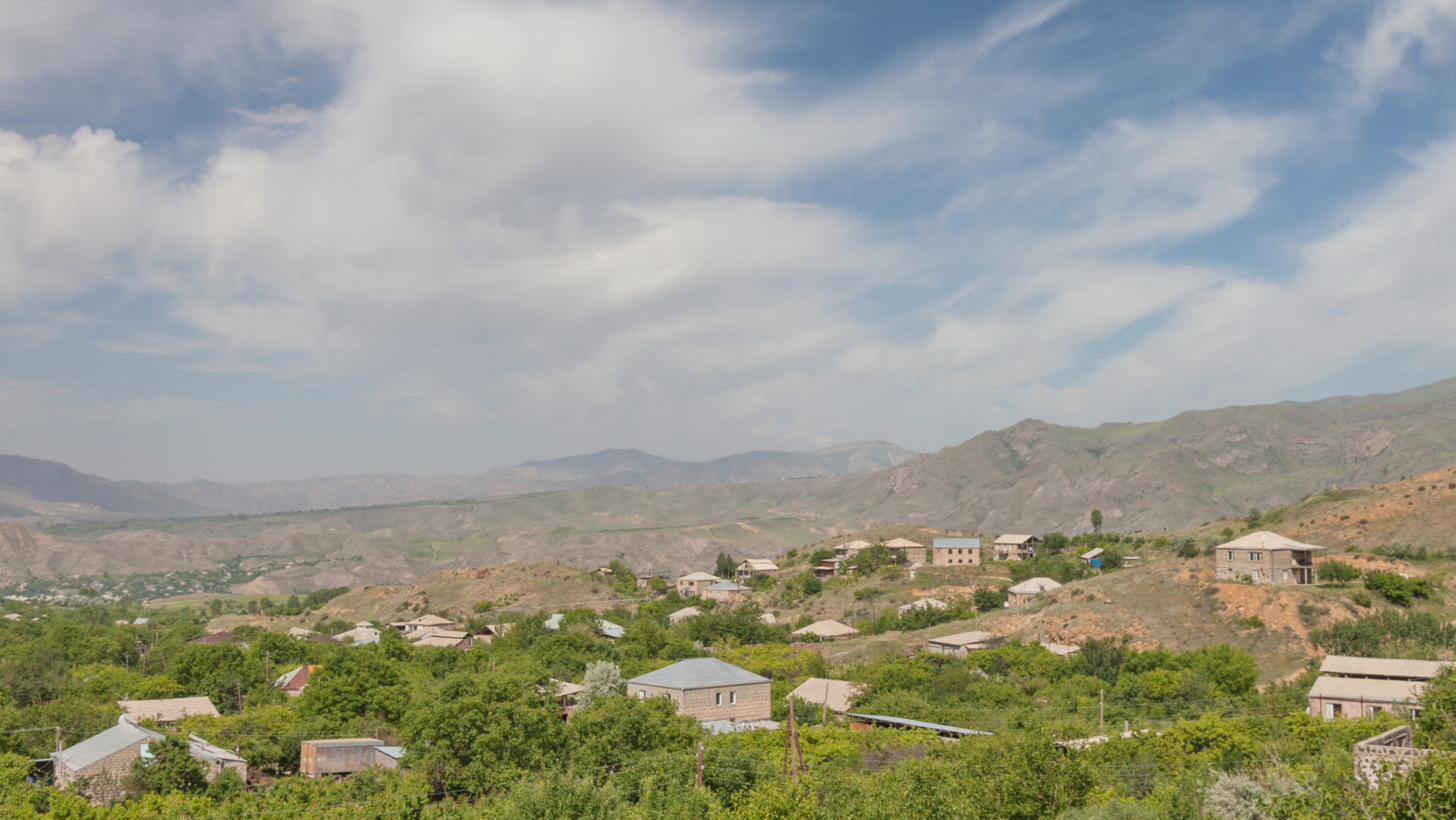

- Location within Armenia Location within Vayots Dzor
- Coordinates: 39°46′42″N 45°20′52″E
- Country: Armenia
- Province: Vayots Dzor
- Municipality: Yeghegnadzor

Population (2011)
  - Total: 2,126
- Time zone: UTC+4 (AMT)

Gladzor (Armenian: Գլաձոր) is a village in the Yeghegnadzor Municipality of the Vayots Dzor Province in Armenia. The historic 13th-century University of Gladzor is located in the village, and the 13th-century Proshaberd fortress is located 6-7 km to the north of the village. The village is immediately bordered by the town of Yeghegnadzor to the south.

== Gallery ==
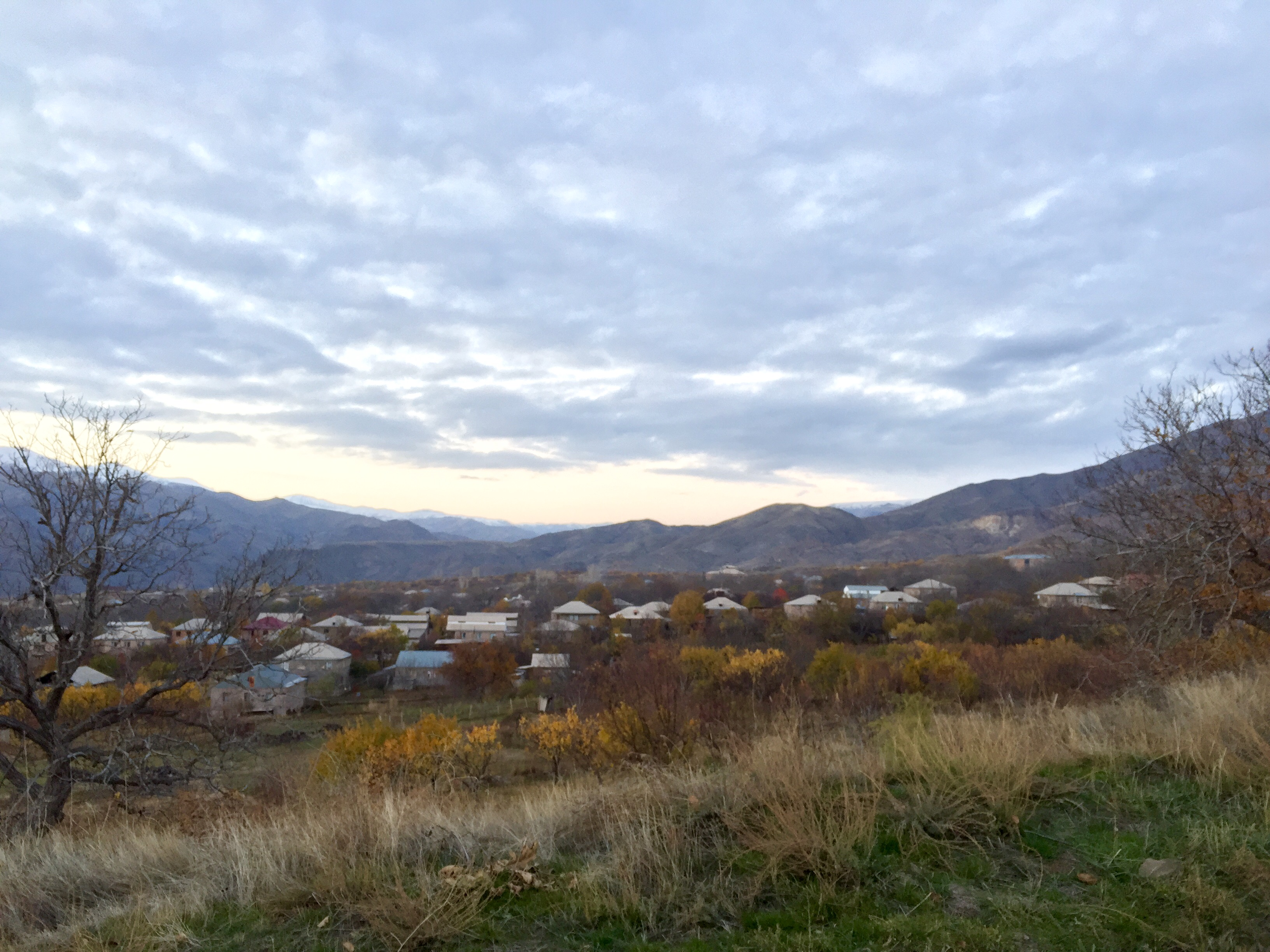
View of the village

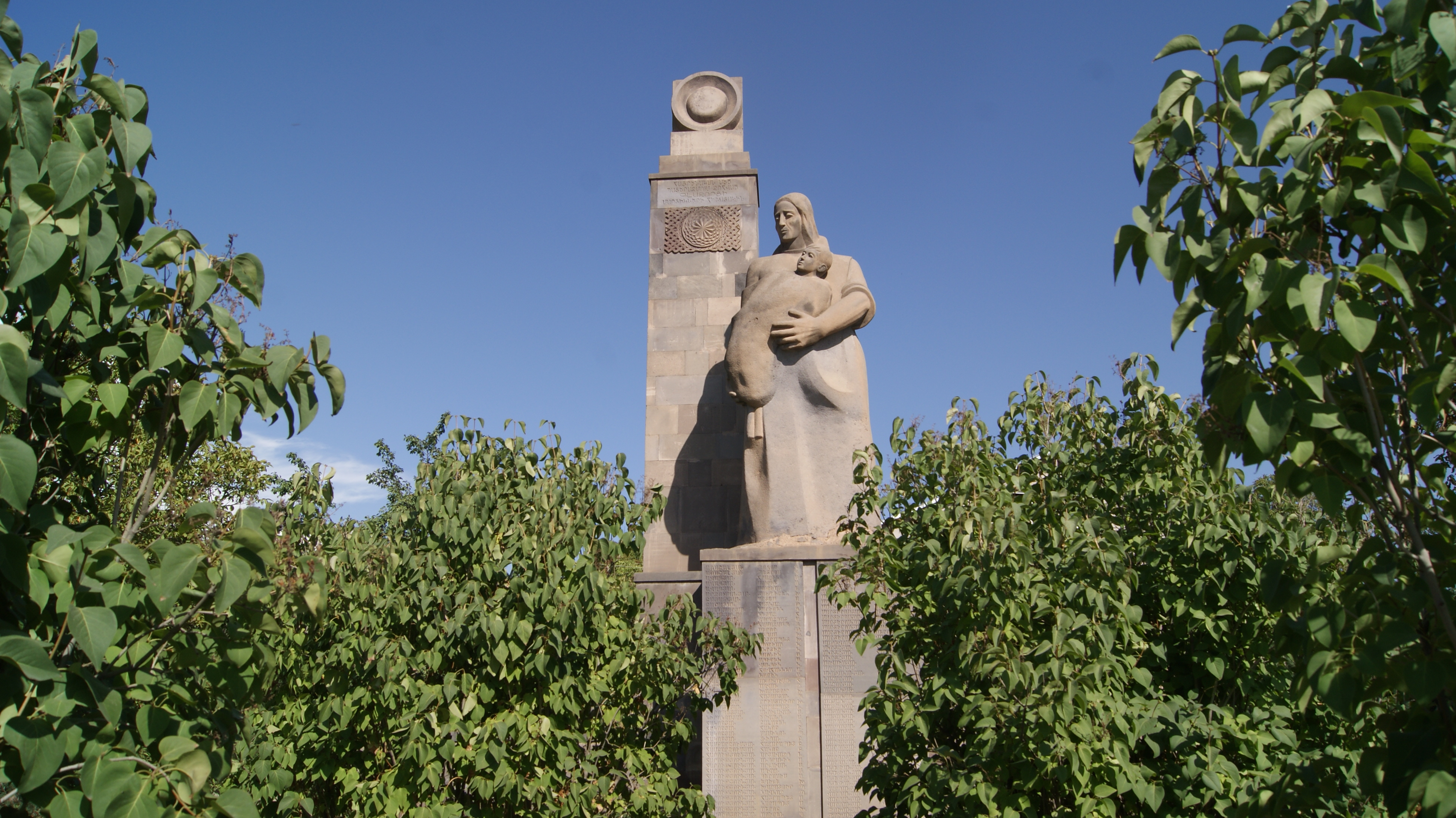
World War II monument

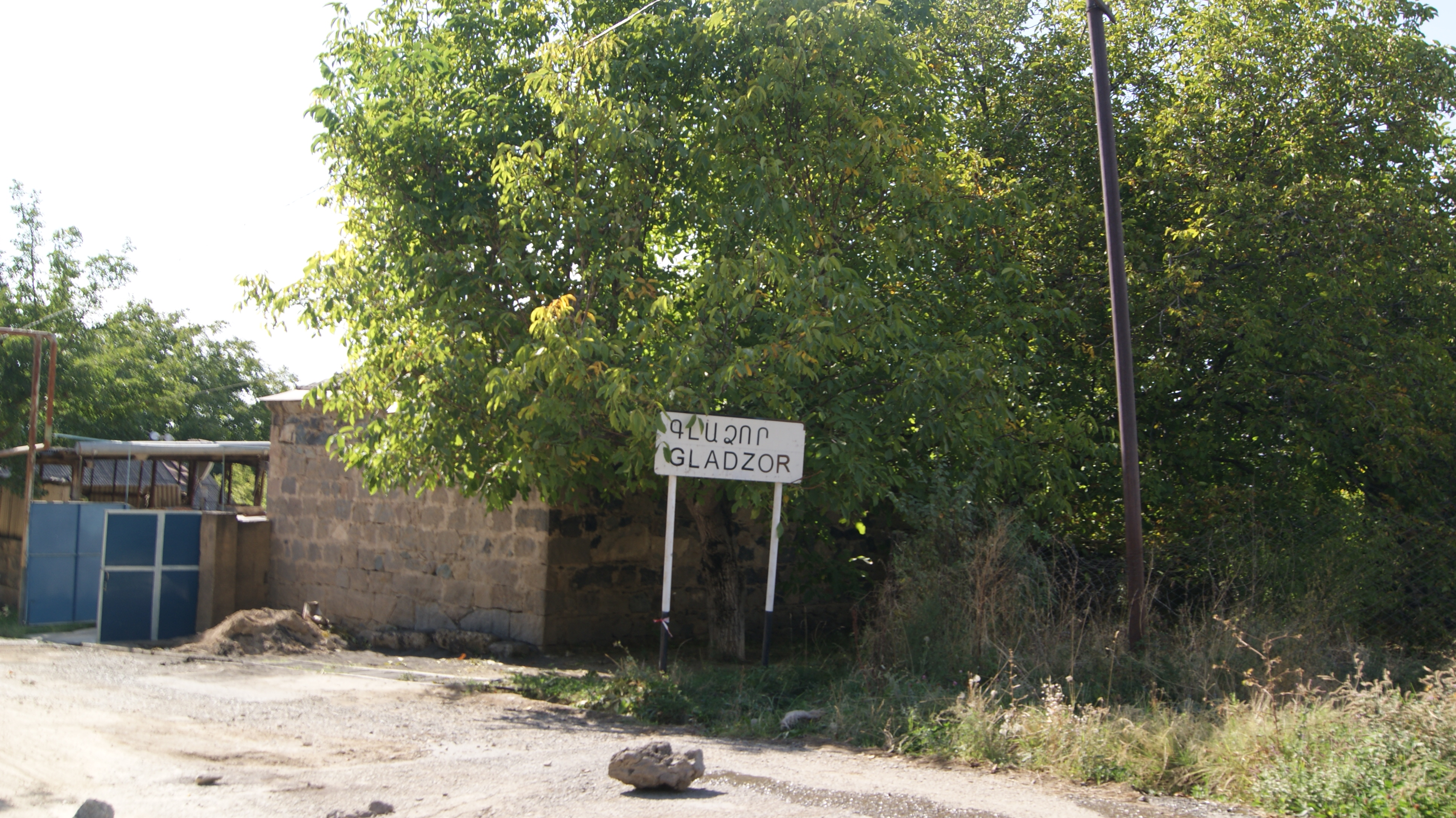
Sign reading "Gladzor" in Armenian

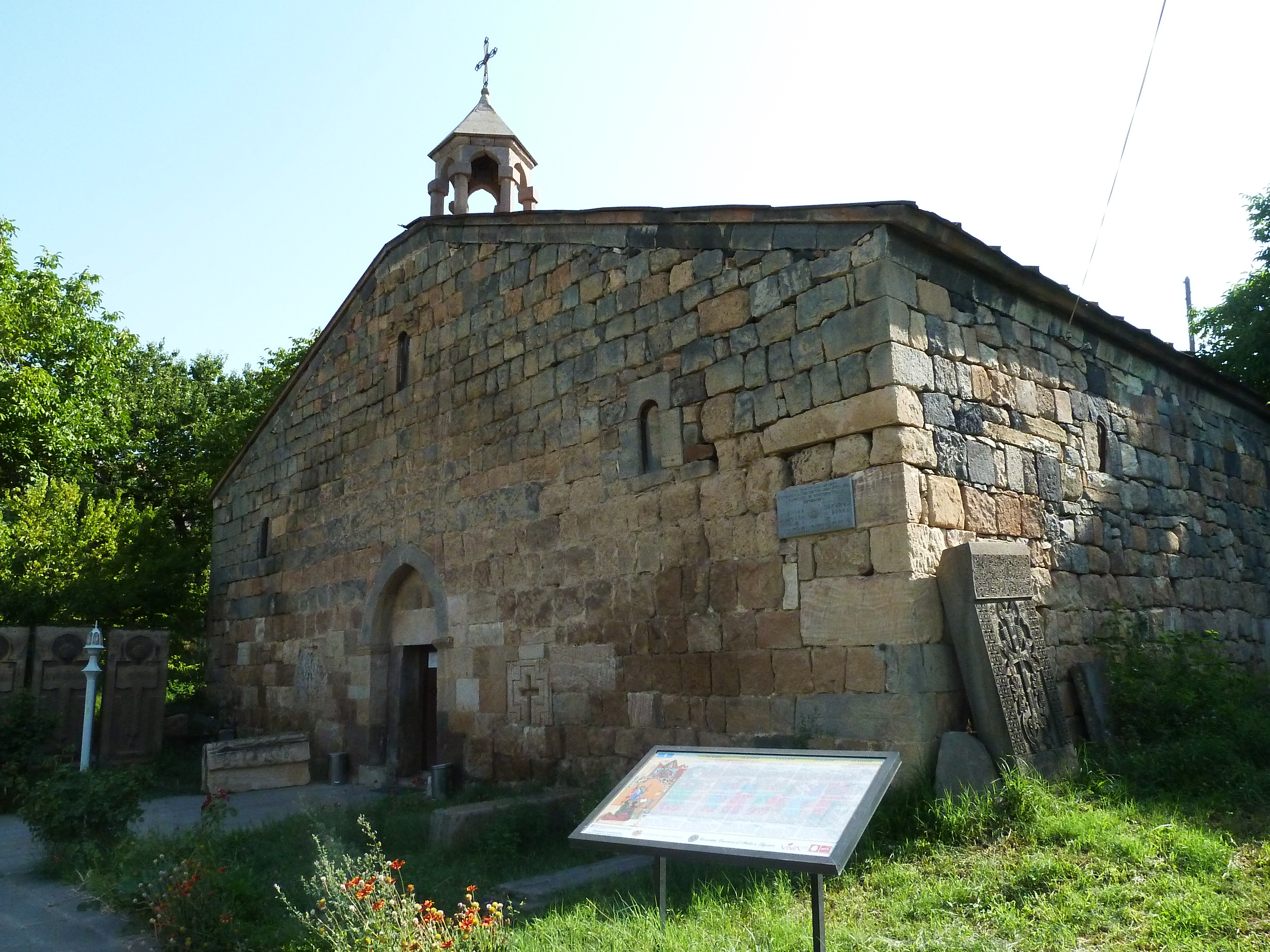
Saint Hakob church in nearby Vernashen, hosting the Gladzor University Museum

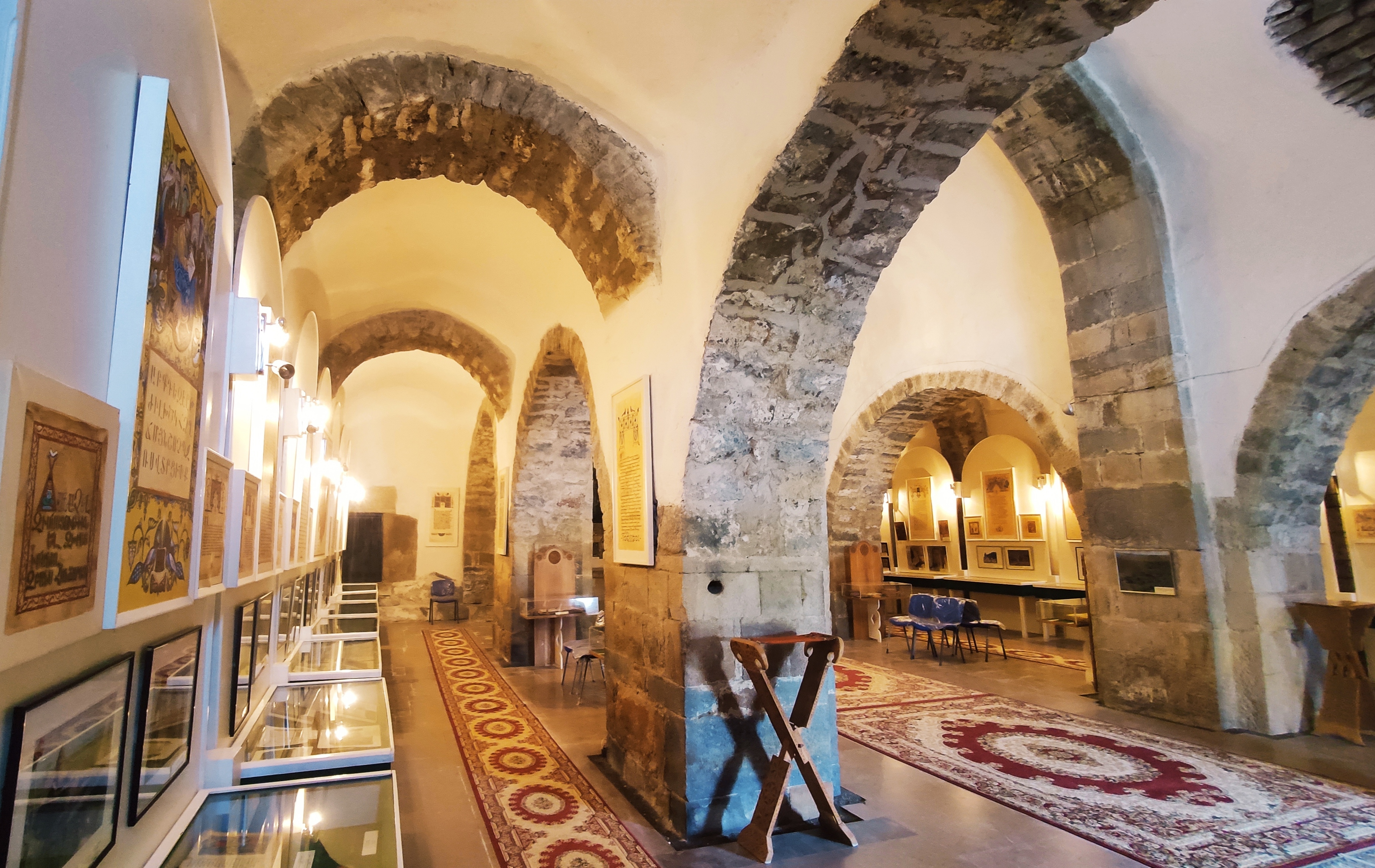
Gladzor University Museum
