= Kamsar (Kamo Sahakyan) =

Armenian painter

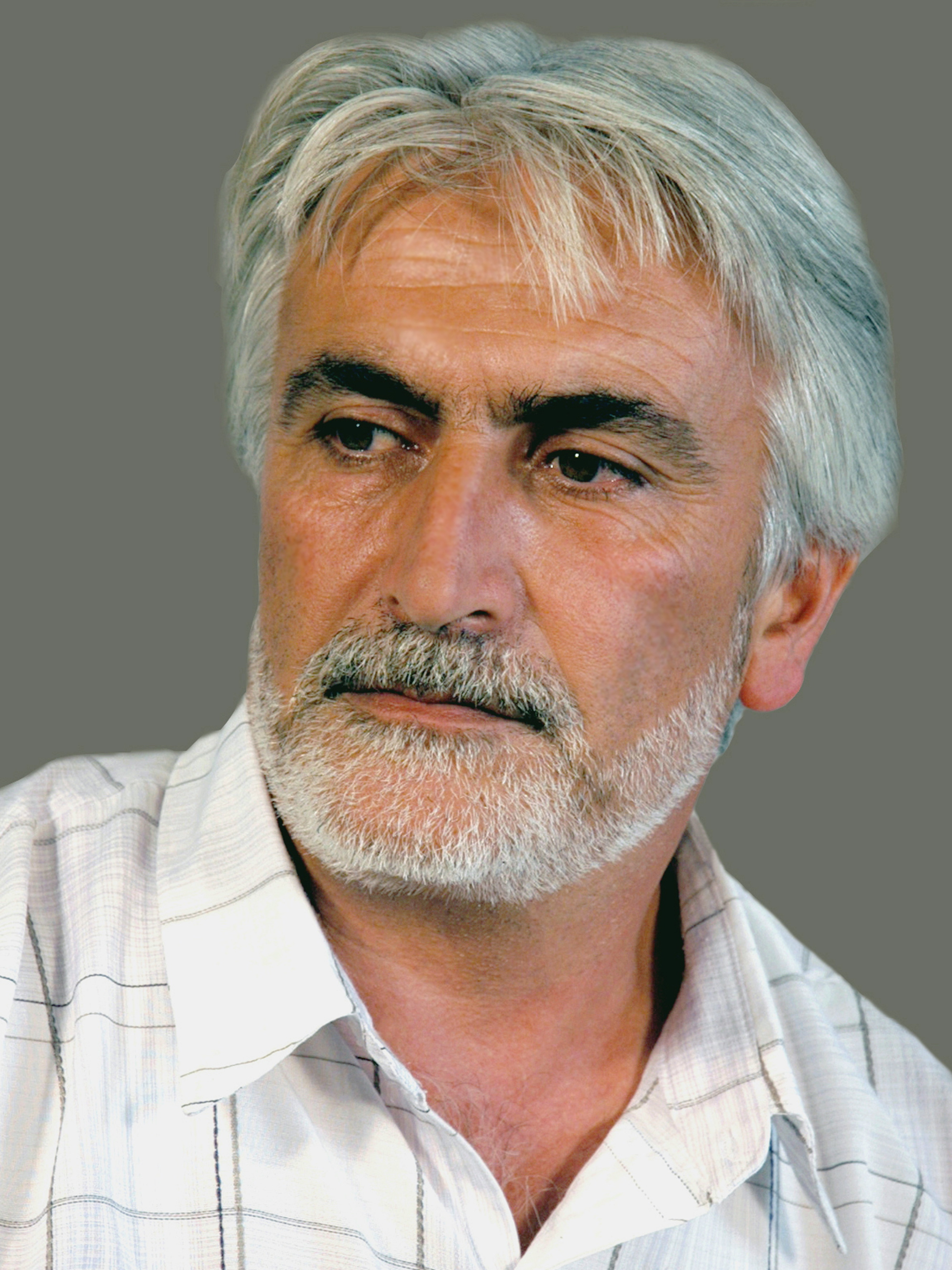
- Born: Kamo Sahakyan; April 16, 1961 (age 64); Yeghegnadzor, Vayots Dzor, Armenia
- Known for: Painter

Kamsar–Kamo Sahakyan (Armenian: Կամո Սահակյան, born April 16, 1961, in Yeghegnadzor), is an Armenian painter.

== Biography ==
Kamsar–Kamo Sahakyan was born in Yeghegnadzor, Armenia. 1971–1976, he studied at Yeghennadzor Art School, in Van Yeghyan's class, who played great role in the formation of the artist's aesthetic taste and the love towards the abstract painting. 1976–1980 studied painting at the Terlemezian School of Arts in Yerevan. Since 1990 Kamsar is a member of Artists' Union of Armenia. Since 1996 Kmasar is the director of Vayots Dzor Regional Museum of Yeghegnadzor.

== Individual exhibitions ==
- Pictorial art works, Yeghegnadzor Geological Museum, 1999
- Yerevan History Museum, 2013

== Group exhibitions ==
- Republican Youth Exhibition, Youth Palace, Yerevan, 1980
- Group exhibition of Yeghegnzdzor artists, Yeghegnadzor Branch of National Art Gallery of Armenia, 1983
- Republican Youth Exhibition, Exhibition Hall of the Union of Artists, Yerevan, 1984
- Jubilee Exhibition on the 70th anniversary of the USSR, the Union of Artists, Yerevan, 1987
- Portrait Republican Exhibition, the Union of Artists, Yerevan, 1988
- Republican Exhibition "Along History Cross-ways", the Union of Artists, Yerevan, 1989
- "EXPORT SALONS" of Fine Art in Foreign Countries, Moscow, Russia, 1990
- "Armenian Artists on the 75 the Anniversary of the Great Genocide", the Union of Artists, Yerevan, 1990
- Exhibition dedicated to independence of the First Republic of Armenia (1918–1920), Union of Artists, Yerevan, 1991
- Group Exhibition, Detroit, US, Contemporary Russian Expressionism, a major exhibition of twenty Russian artists currently living and working in Moscow, St. Petersburg, Kyiv, Yerevan, New York and Detroit, International Gallery, Detroit, USA, 1993
- "Yeghegnadzor Painters" group exhibition, Yeghegnadzor Geological Museum, 1997
- "NORAVANK-99" Fine Art Exhibition, Yeghegnadzor Branch of National Art Gallery of Armenia, Yeghegnadzor, 1999
- "Painters of Vayots Dzor and Syunik" Fine Art Exhibition of Works, Goris Art Gallery, Goris, 2005
- "Exhibition of Vayots Dzor Painters' Works", Yeghegnadzor Geological Museum, 2010
- Joint Exhibition of Armenian Iranian Art, Yeghegnadzor Geological Museum, 2012
- "One work Exhibition" on the 80th anniversary of RA artists, the Union of Artists, Yerevan, 2012

== Works ==
Kamsar is an artist of all colors.

- "The Land and the Sky"
- "Spring"
- "Struggle for Existence"
- "Earthquake"
- "Delight"
- "White Spring of My Memory"
- "Hijacking"
- "Family"
- "The White Spring of my Memory"
- "In Memory of Lusine Zakaryan"
- "Duch Motif"
- "Capture"
- "Interpersonal Flash"
- "Embarrasement"
- "An Autumn Day"
- "Mountains"
- "Awakening"

== Gallery ==
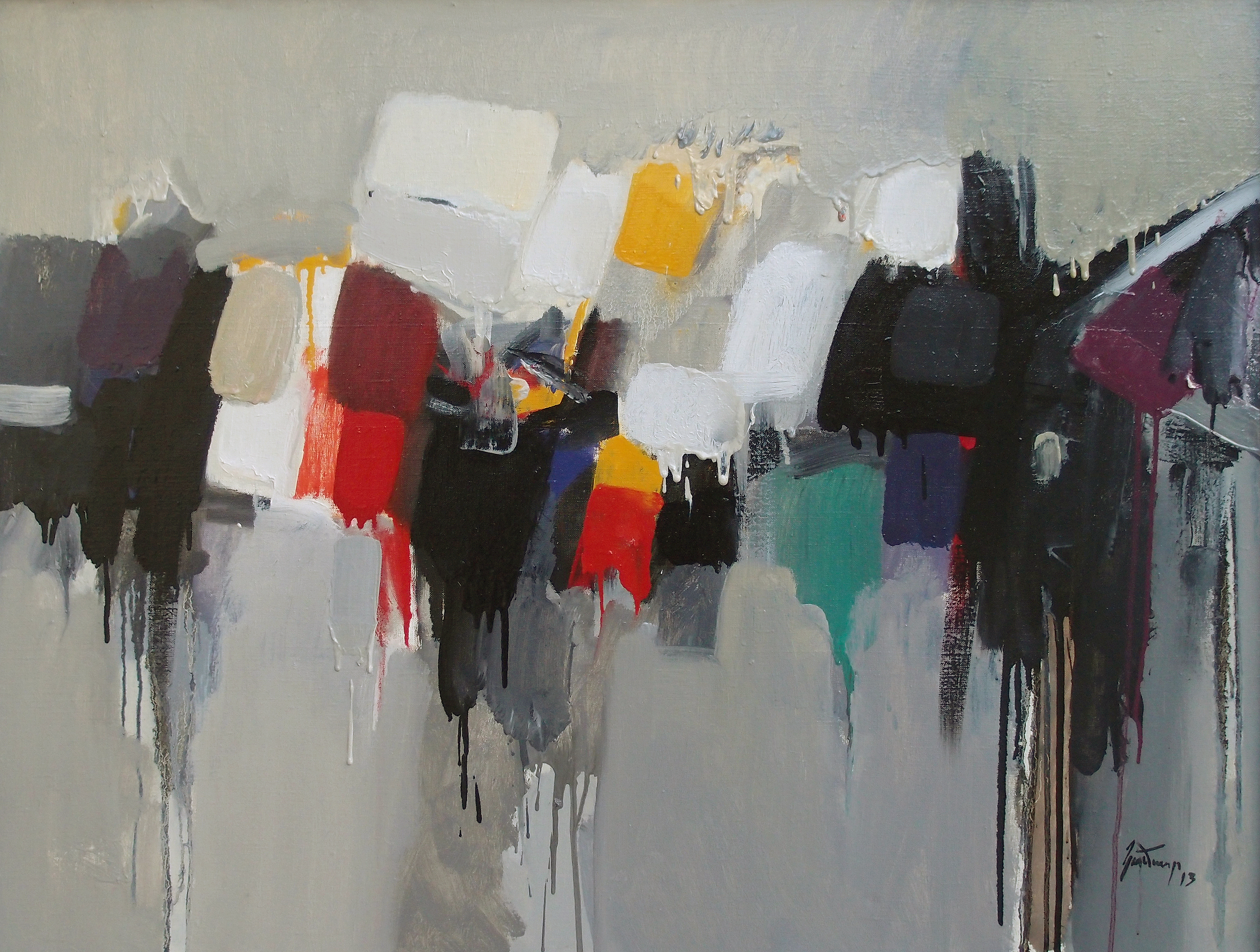
Composition, 2013

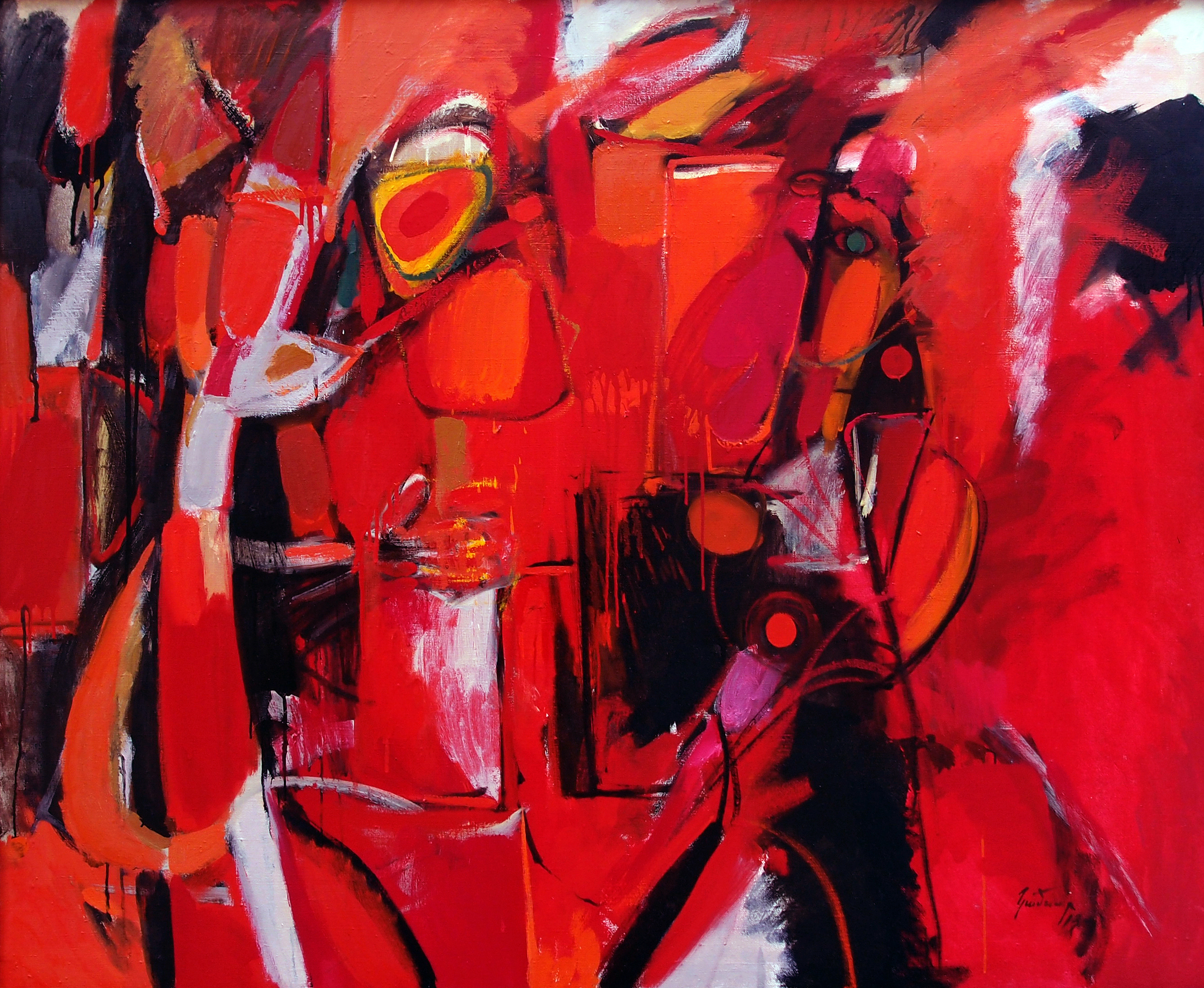
Autumn prelude, 2013

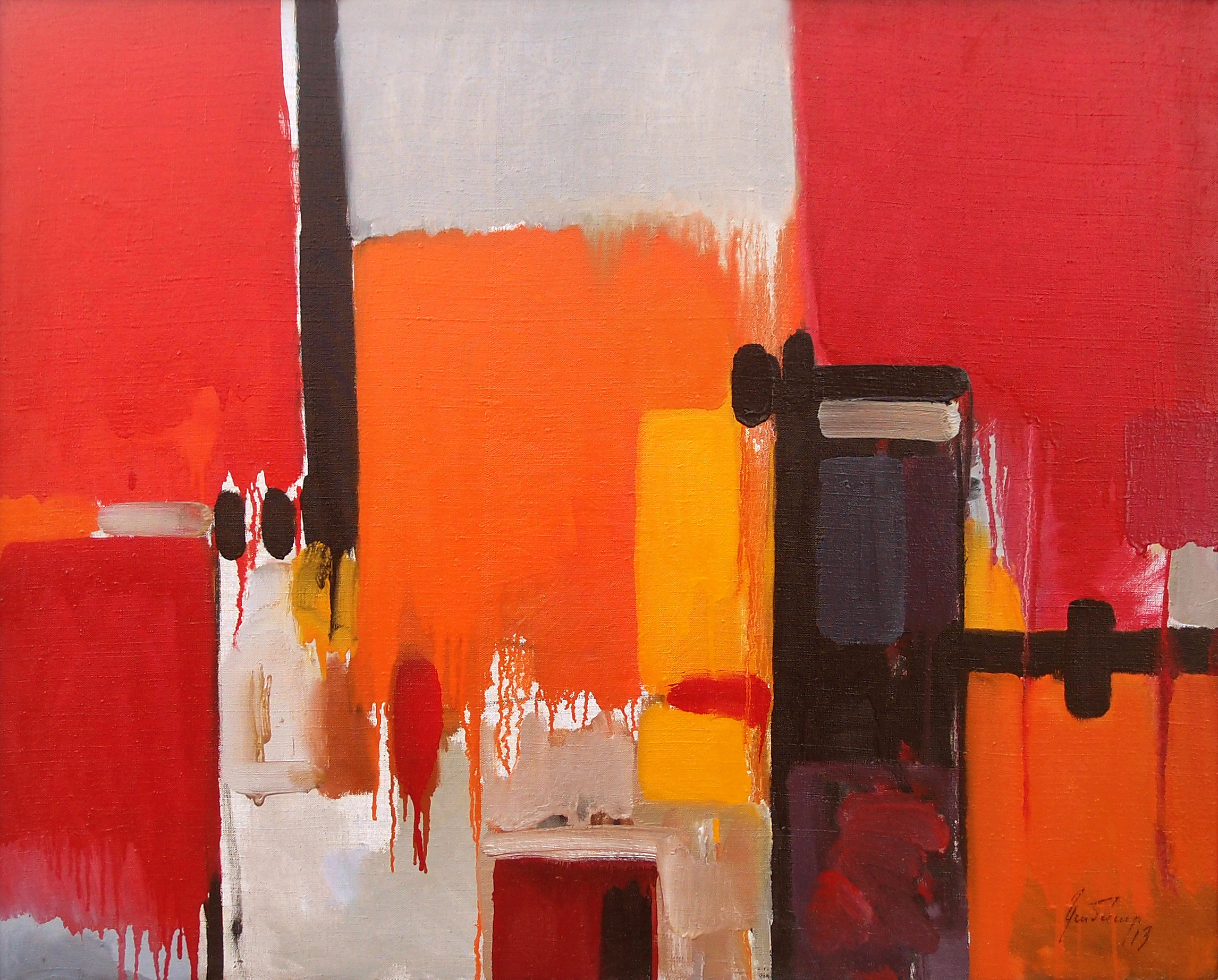
Red and Orange, 2013

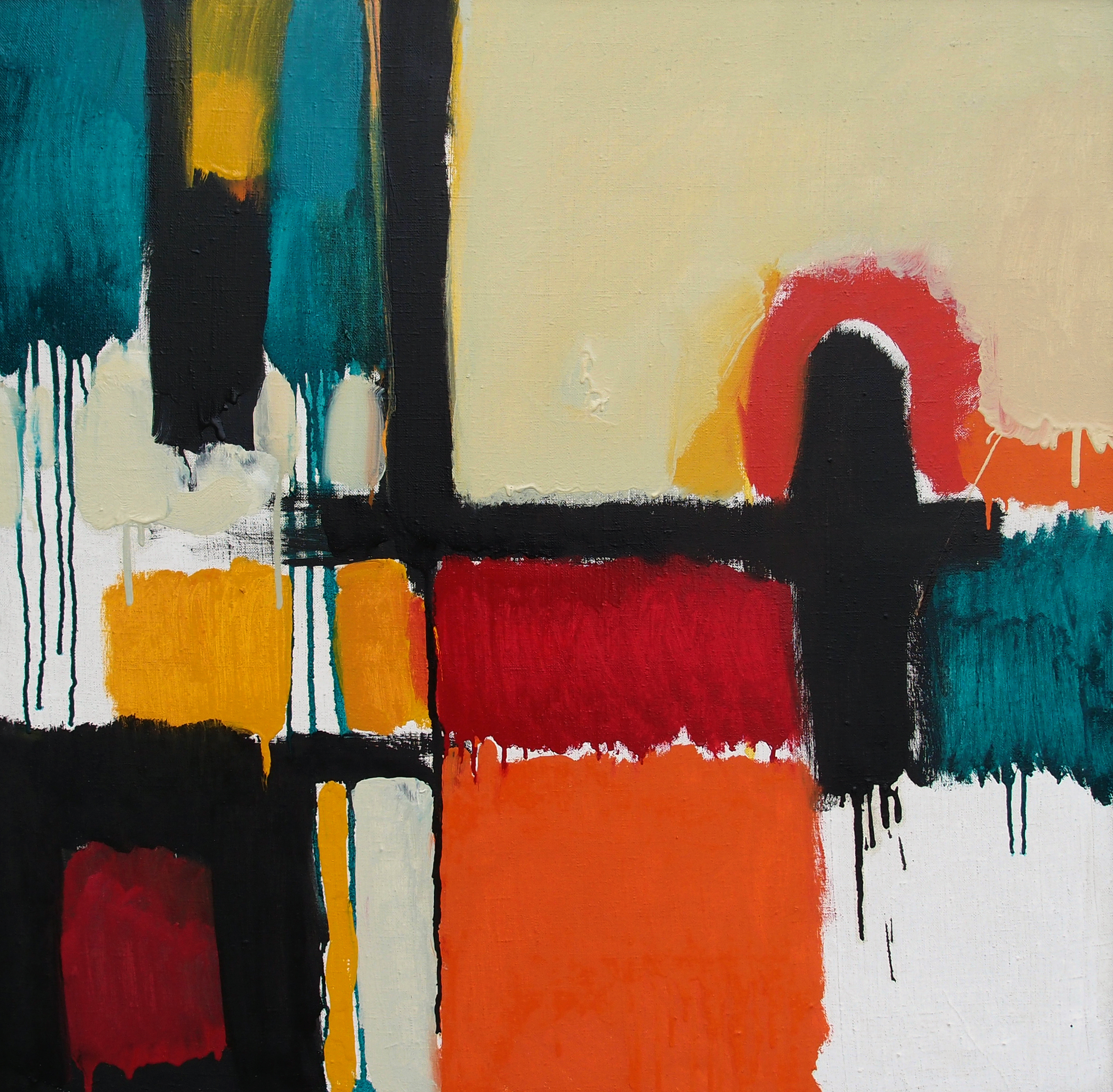
Window, 2013

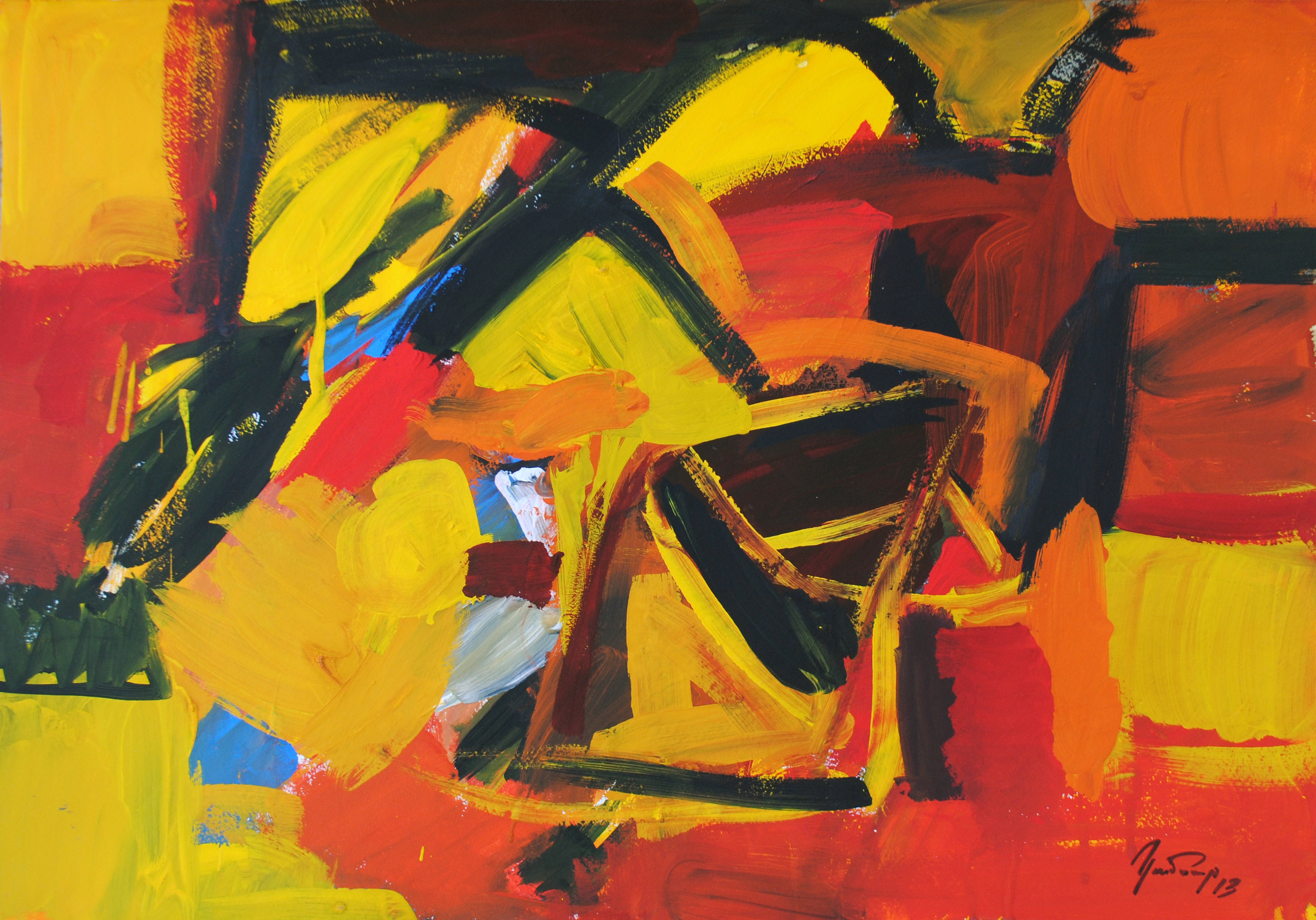
Autumn, 2013

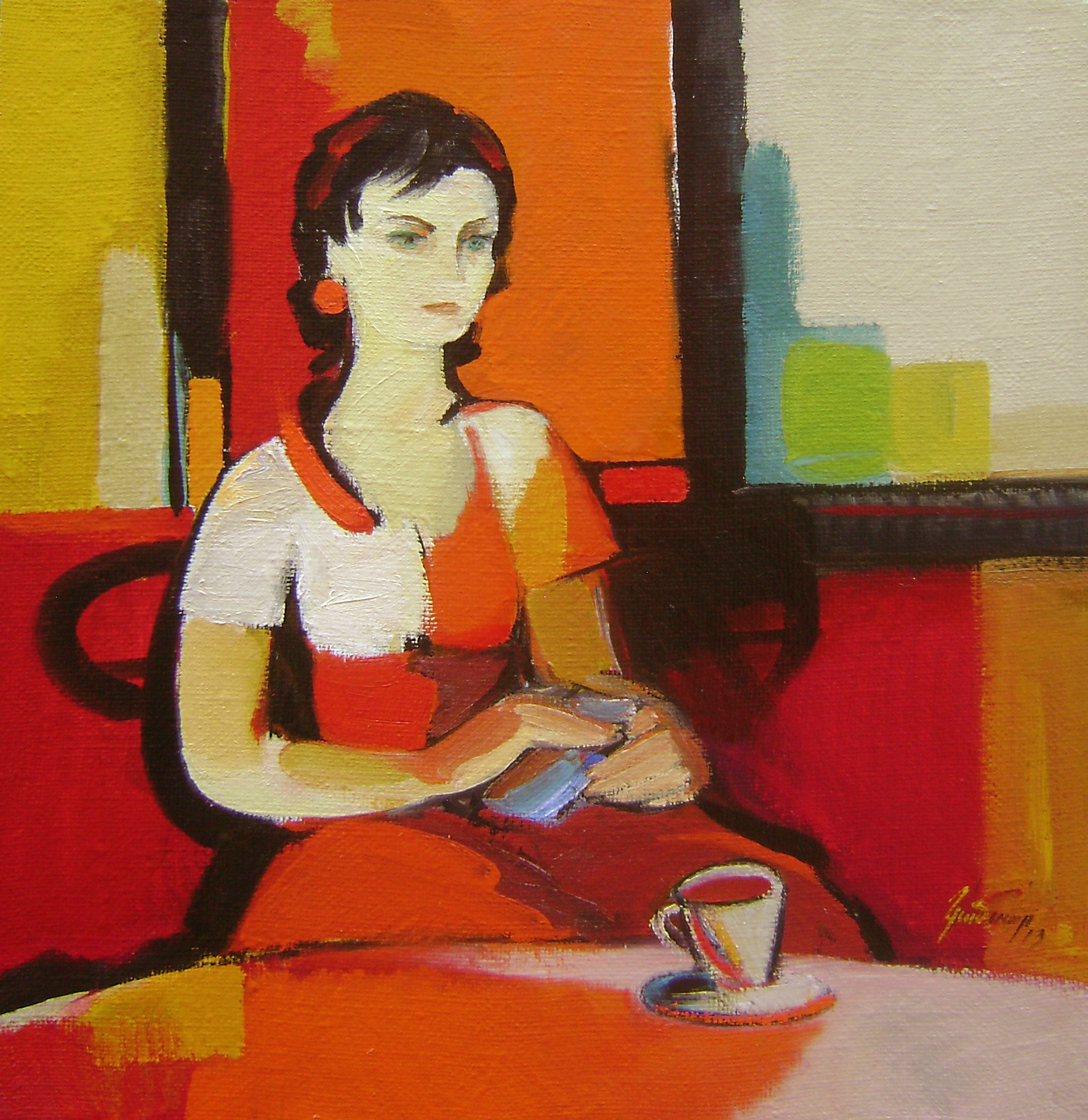
Anahit, 2013

== See also ==
- List of Armenian artists
- List of Armenians
- Culture of Armenia
