= Moz, Vayots Dzor =

Town in Armenia, destroyed in 735

Moz in the province of Vayots Dzor was an ancient town in southern Armenia that was destroyed by an earthquake and volcanic eruption in the year of 735. It is the oldest historically documented settlement in Vayots Dzor. In the 7th to 8th centuries, the town was a significant trading and craft center on the Silk Road, with several thousand inhabitants. Moz was the main seat of the Armenian princes of Syunik from the House of Orbelian, who relocated it to Yeghegis after the destruction of the town.

Moz is located on a 1,200 meter high hill above the right bank of the Arpa River, three to four kilometers southeast of the village of Malishka. In its heyday, the town was surrounded by fertile lands and dense forests. After the forests disappeared, the area began to be devastated. The place itself has disappeared. However, the ruins, that occupy an area of about 8 hectares, still lie on an important transport route, the M2 highway, the only transit route for cargo from Iran to Yerevan and on to Georgia.

== History ==
The oldest traces of settlement in Moz are dated to the Bronze Age. They include a large burial ground that extends across scattered hills about two to three kilometers east of Moz, as well as individual graves within Moz itself. People were buried in pairs. In addition to human ashes, archaeologists found dog skeletons, burnt branches, clay and ceramic vessels, obsidian, decorated bronze needles, and other objects. Based on their decoration, they are dated to the early 1st millennium BCE and associated with the Treghk-Vanadzor culture. Discoveries from a later period indicate that the site played an important role in the Urartian Empire. Hellenistic artifacts demonstrate the continued significance of the site after the fall of the empire.

In the 7th to 8th centuries, Moz was an important trade and craft center on the Silk Road. At that time the city had several thousand inhabitants. An earthquake and a volcanic eruption destroyed the city under the control of the Armenian Orbelian princes in 735. They moved their headquarters from Moz to Yeghegis after the destruction. The medieval historian Stepanos Orbelian describes the fall of Moz as divine punishment for the death of catholicos Stepanos Siunetsi, who is said to have been killed by a prostitute in Moz. According to him, an impenetrable darkness enveloped Moz's borders immediately after the murder. The earth then shook for forty days, burying tens of thousands of people. What remained was a desert, which is why the place was given the name Vayots Dzor (= Valley of the woe), which is still in use today. However, dates recorded on khachkars (cross stones) and tombstones (1266, 1284, 1311, 1321, 1471, 1483) as well as tribute payments to the Tatev monastery in the 13th century prove that the place was not immediately abandoned, even though it had lost its importance. Later, the small village of Novlar (also known as Moz) was located on the village desert. In Stepanos Orbelya’s list of villages belonging to Tatev its tax size was 12. The successor settlement was abandoned at the beginning of the 20th century. .

The first excavations of Moz town took place in 1930 by archaeological expedition of Academy of Science of ASSR. The next and bigger excavations were undertaken between 1978 and 1979 under the direction of Hasmik Israyelyan. The Bronze Age and Medieval artifacts found during this excursion and subsequent excavations are on display at the Yeghegnadzor Regional Museum.

== Earthquake and volcanic eruption ==
Historians and chronicler Movses Kaghankatvatsi, Stepanos Orbelyan, and Kirakos Gandzaketsi describe Moz town and the earthquake that shoke the land for forty days. The first survived report on the event is given by Kaghankatvatsi (10th century). According to him the earthquake was accompanied by “an impenetrable sarkness” over Mocu town, it shoke the lande for forty days and nearly 10000 people were “swallowed up”. The name of the region – Vayots Dzor (=Valley of the woe), Movses connects to this devastating earthquake.

Stepanos Orbelian (13th century) gives more detailed description. Completing Kaghankatvatsi he reports about the collapse of mountains, the complete crumbling of rocks. Common houses and fine palaces alike were turned to tombs for their residents. Springs and rivers dried up. Sounds similar to human voices were heard from the depths. The number of victims as 10000 he reported as registered taxpayers and added that nobody knew how many unregistered people perished in the earthquake.

Kirakos Gandzaketsi (13th century) gives an abbreviated account of Orbelian's narrative.

In their work of “A new catalogue of earthquakes in the historical Armenian area from antiquity to the 12th century” geologists Guidoboni, Emanuela; Traina, and Giusto (1995), carefully analyzing all the historical and geographical sources available, came to a conclusion that in 735 AD indeed there was a devastating earthquake in historical Moz (or Mozu) town.

Even though none of the sources gives any information about the volcanic eruption caused by the Moz earthquake, nowadays it is widely believed that Vayotssar mountain, which is located in Vayots Dzor province, north-west from the village Herher, is the result of that “eruption”. Cuneiform expert and cartographer Eduard Melikyan insists on the assertion and shows the traces of lava on a map. He explains the existence of hot spring (such as Jermuk, Jermajur, Tsghuk) near the area by that eruption. Another justification he gives is the duration of the earthquake – 40 days. According to Melikyan only volcanic ones have such durations.

According to geologists, even if the youngest volcano in the territory of Armenia is Vayotssar mountain, its last eruption was 40000 years ago.

== Origin of the name "Vayots Dzor" ==
As we have seen above three historians explain the origin of “Vayots Dzor” by the devastating earthquake. This means that it should be mentioned in literature since 8th century. However, Movses Khorenatsi, who lived 841 years before Orbelian and 242 years before the horrible event, already used the name of Vayots Dzor. Egishe Vardapet, who also lived long before the earthquake, used the name of the province as it is now.
