= Yeghegnadzor Regional Museum =

Museum in Armenia

- Եղեգնաձորի երկրագիտական թանգարան
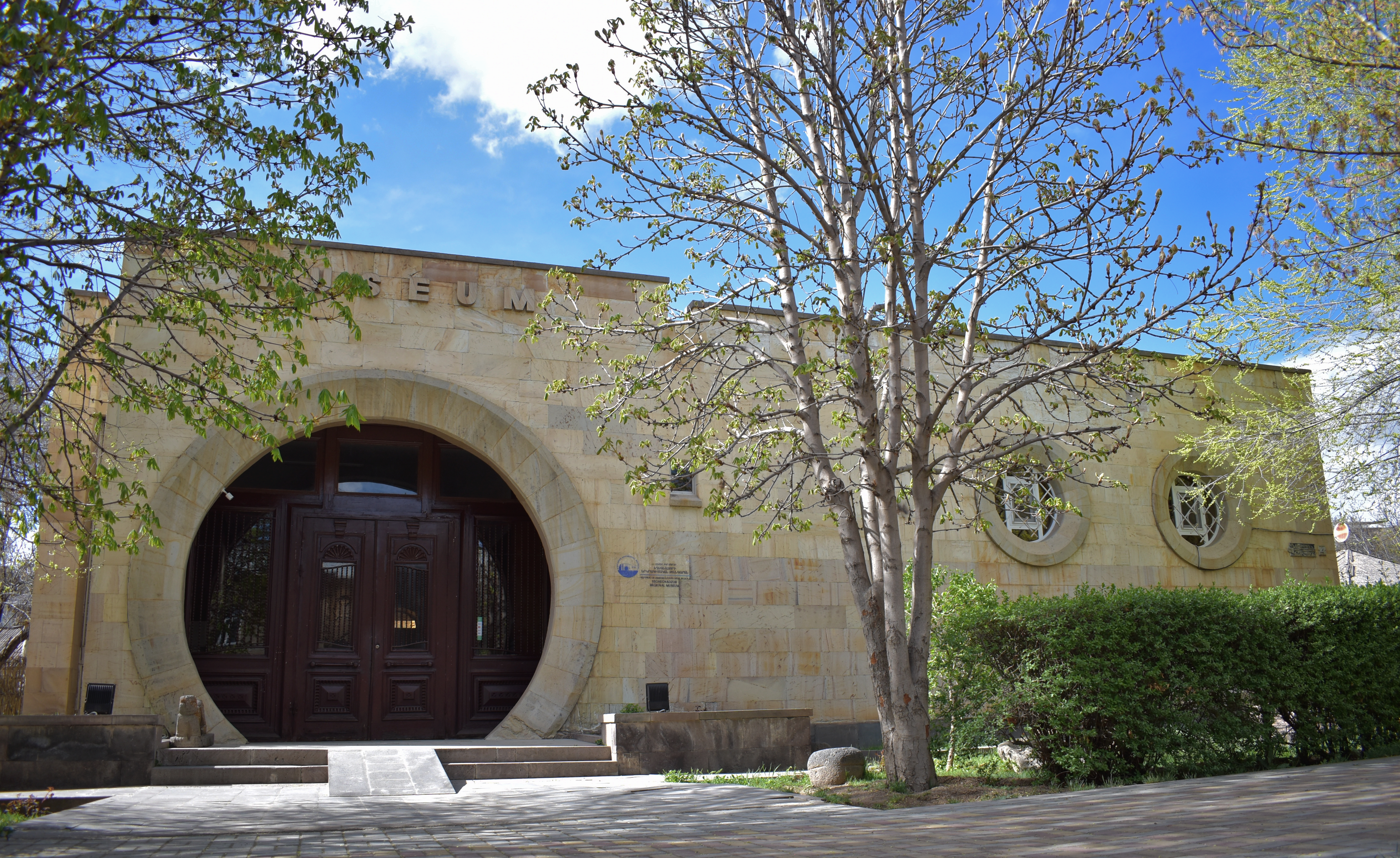
- Entrance to the museum
- Established: 1968
- Location: 4 Shahumyan Street, Yeghegnadzor
- Coordinates: 39.7643°N 45.3320°E
- Type: local lore
- Website: iatp.am

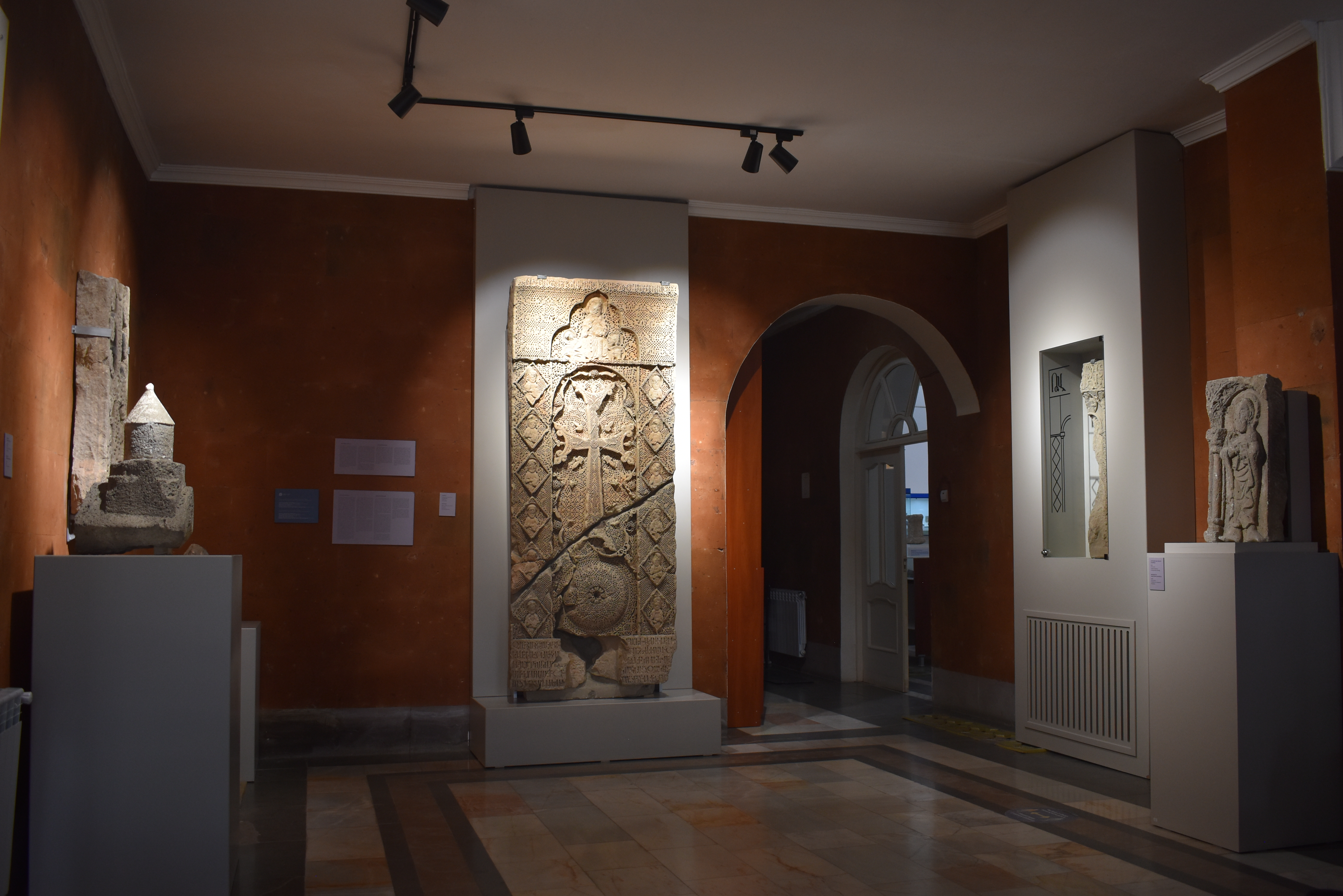
Interior of the museum

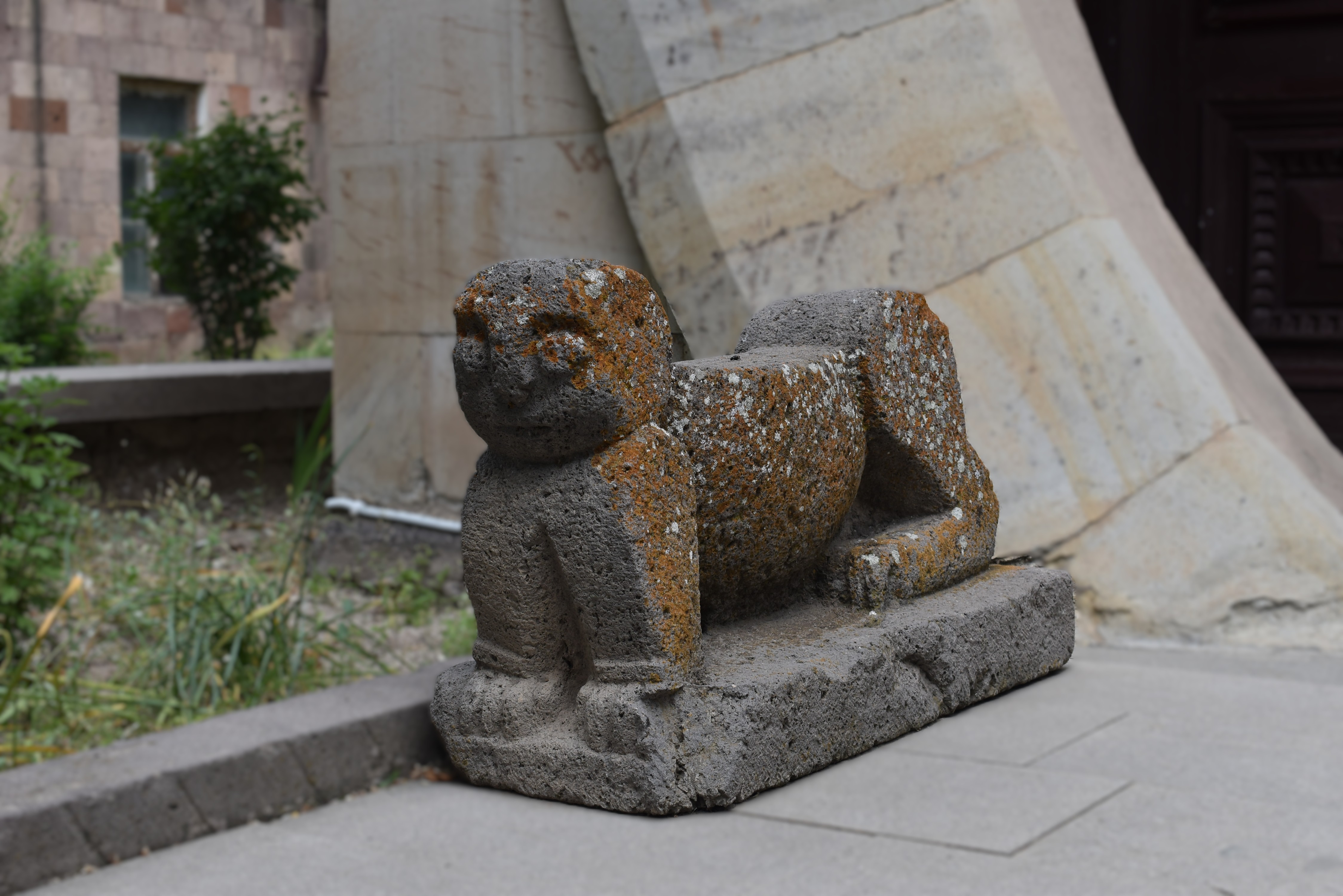
Statuette to the left of the entrance

The Yeghegnadzor Regional Museum, Armenian: Եղեգնաձորի երկրագիտական թանգարան, is a museum in Yeghegnadzor, in the province (marz) of Vayots Dzor in southern Armenia.. It was established in 1968, and holds approximately 9000 archaeological and ethnological artefacts dating from pre-historic times to the twentieth century.

== Collection ==
The museum contains approximately 9000 objects, ranging in date from pre-historic times to the twentieth century. They include jewellery, tools, utensils, carpets and coins. The most significant is an intricate fourteenth-century khachkar carved by Momik, originally in the monastery of Noravank; it is two parts, which were found in different places.

The Bronze Age and Medieval artifacts found during the archiological excavations of ancient Moz town of 1930, 1978, 1979 also are on display at the Yeghegnadzor Regional Museum.

== Gallery ==
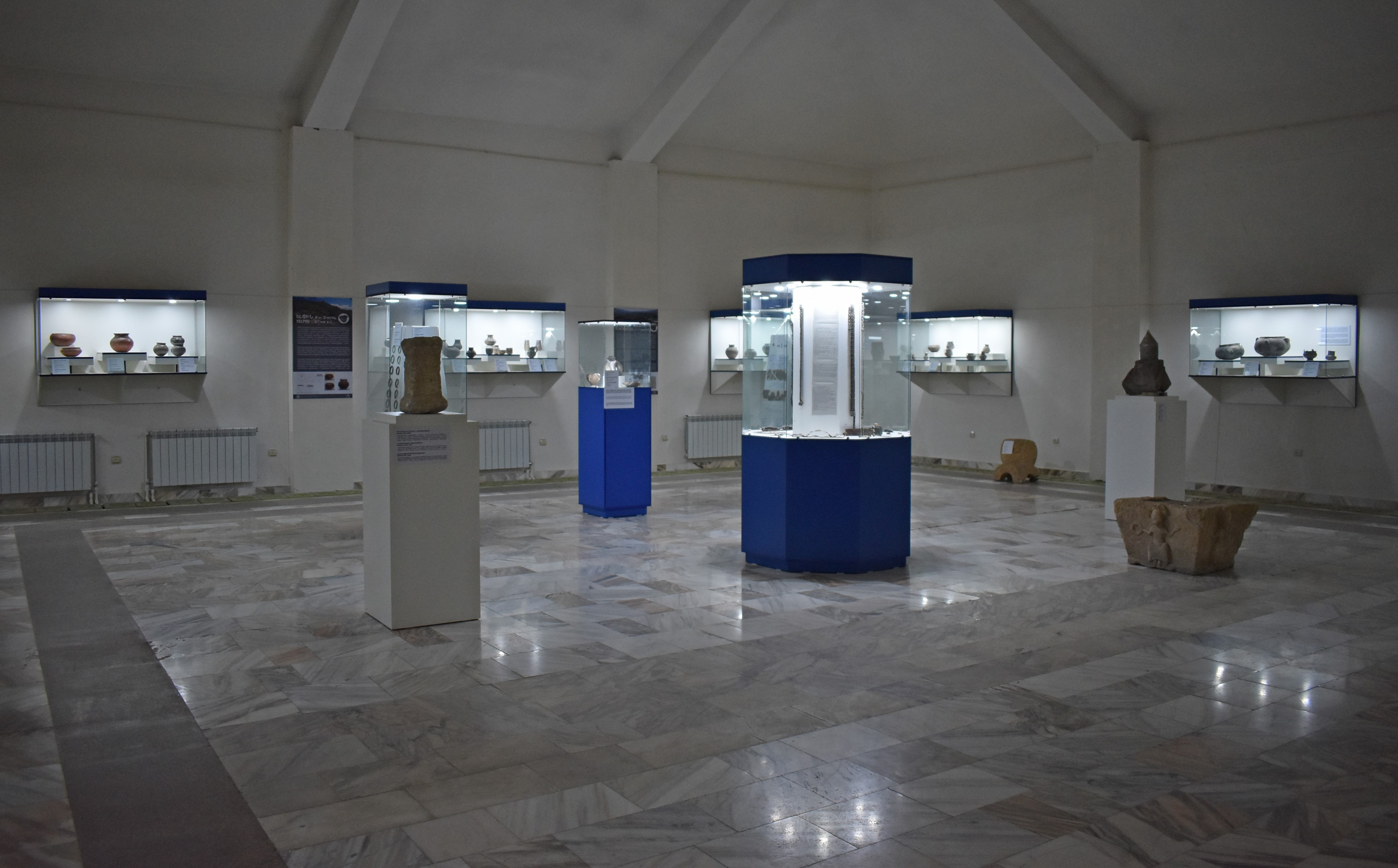
The Archaeology hall

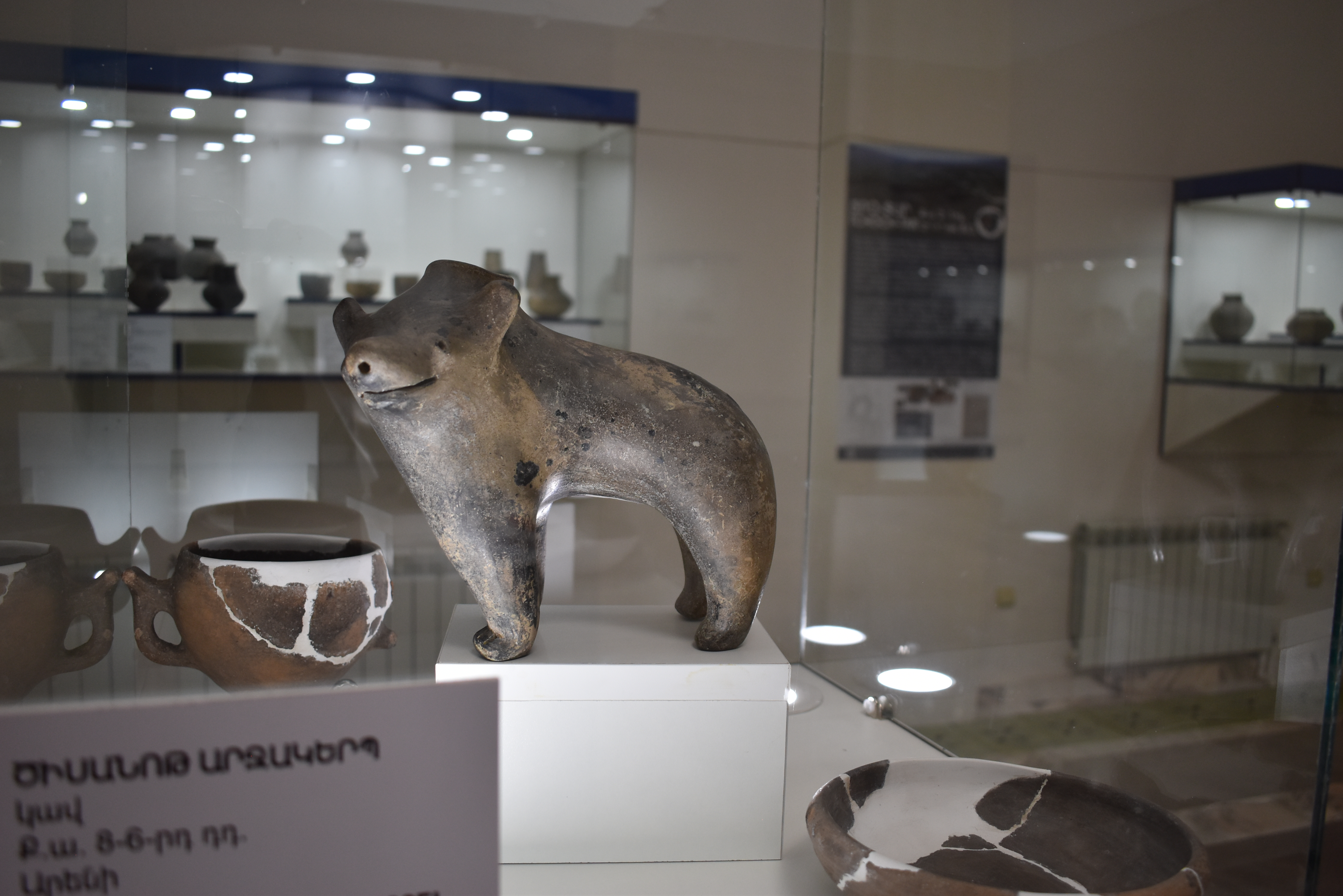
Bear-shaped ritual vessel

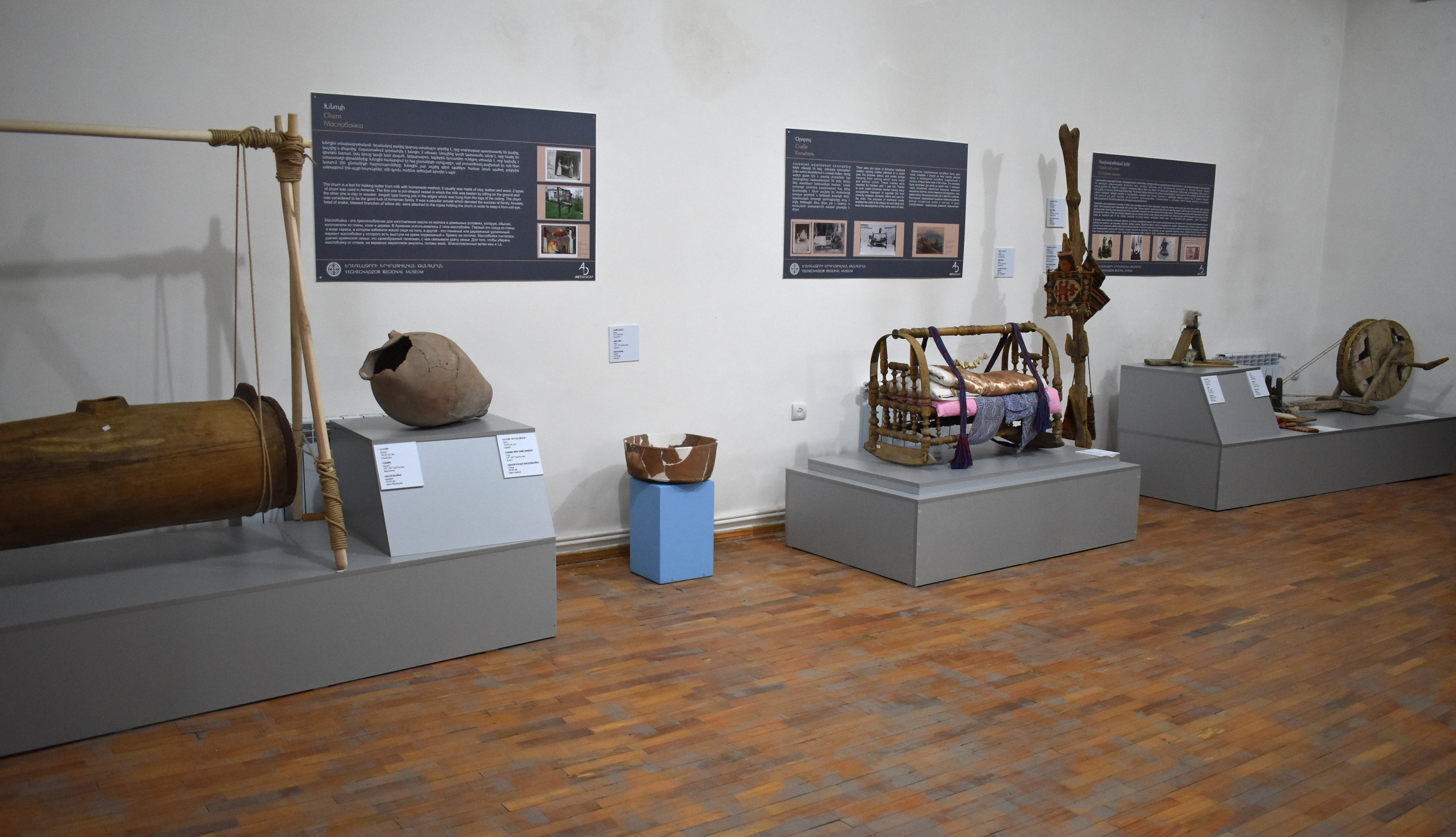
The Ethnography hall
