= Yeghegnadzor =

Capital and largest city of Vayots Dzor, Armenia

Yeghegnadzor Եղեգնաձոր
- Town; Urban Community
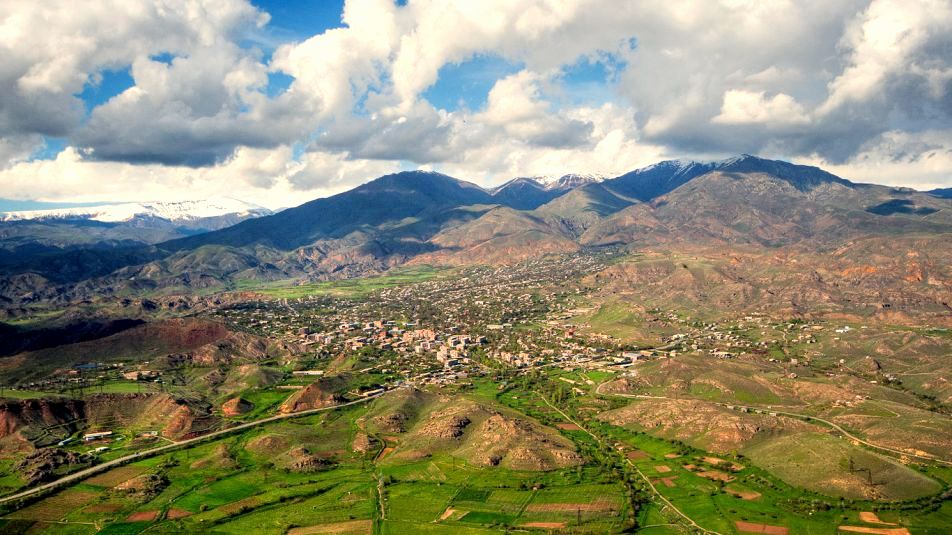

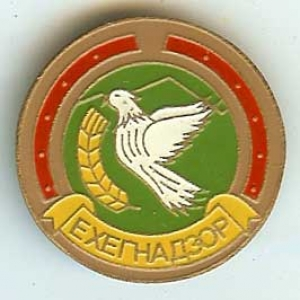
- Coat of arms

- Location within Armenia Location within Vayots Dzor
- Coordinates: 39°45′40″N 45°20′00″E
- Country: Armenia
- Province: Vayots Dzor
- Municipality: Yeghegnadzor
- First mentioned: 5th century

Government
  - Mayor: Davit Harutyunyan

Area
  - Total: 278 km^{2} (107 sq mi)
- Elevation: 1,194 m (3,917 ft)

Population (2022)
  - Total: 6,912
  - Density: 24.9/km^{2} (64.4/sq mi)
- Time zone: UTC+4 (AMT)
- Area code: 281
- Website: www.yeghegnadzor.am

Yeghegnadzor (Armenian: Եղեգնաձոր [jɛʁɛɡnɑˈd͡zɔɾ]) is a town and urban municipal community in southern Armenia, serving as the provincial capital of Vayots Dzor Province and the Yeghegnadzor Municipality. It is located at a road distance of 123 km (76 mi) south of the capital Yerevan, on the shores of Srkghonk River (Armenian: Սրկղոնք), at a height of 1,194 meters (3,917 ft) above sea level.

As per the 2016 official estimate, Yeghegnadzor had a population of around 6,600. As of the 2011 census, the population of the town was 7,944 and as of the 2022 census, the population of the town was 6,912. Yeghegnadzor is the seat of the Diocese of Vayots Dzor of the Armenian Apostolic Church.

== Etymology ==
The name Yeghegnadzor consists of two Armenian words: yegheg (Armenian: եղեգ) meaning cane, and dzor (Armenian: ձոր) meaning valley. Thus, the name of the town means "valley of canes".

== History ==
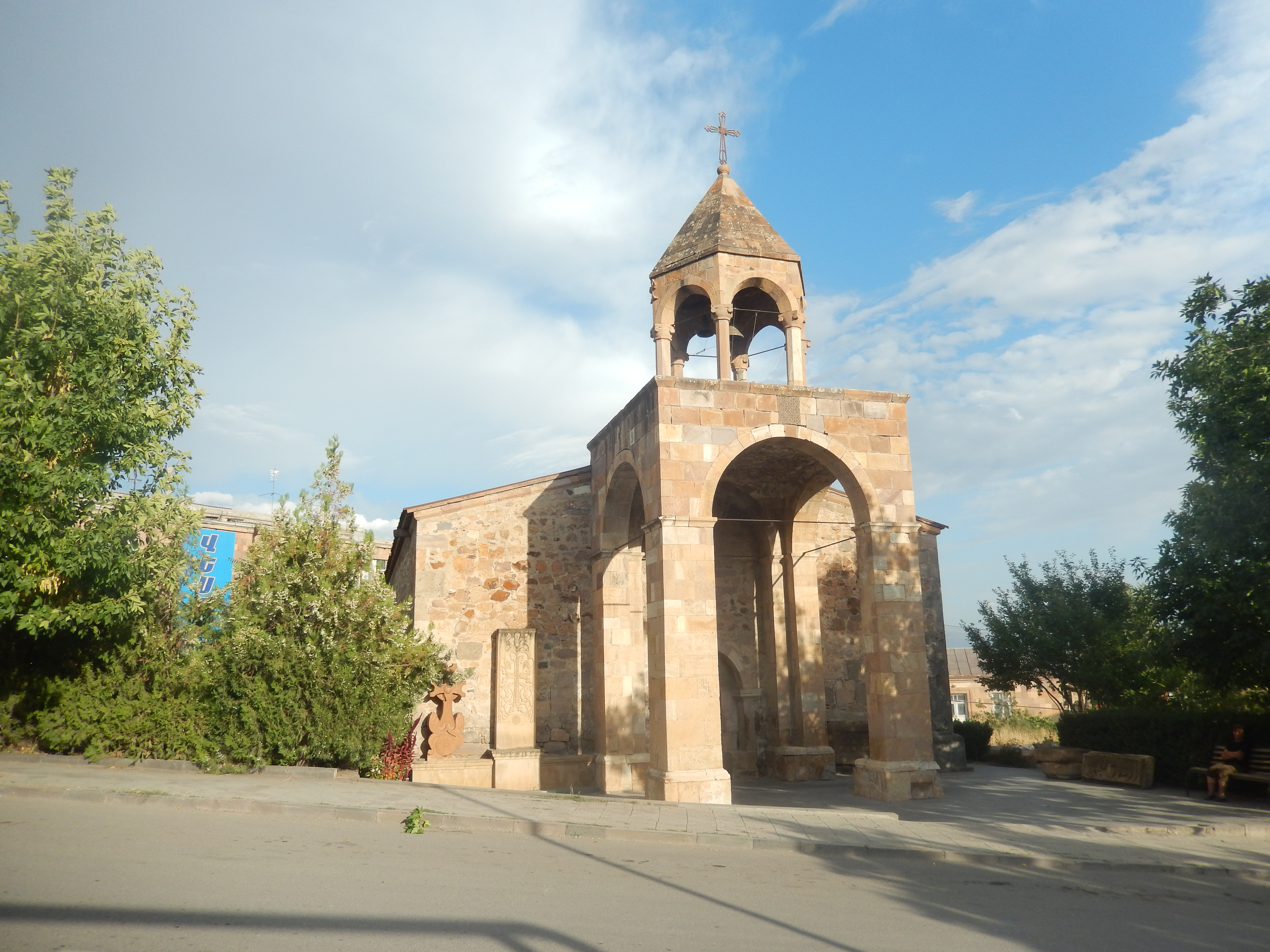
Cathedral of the Holy Mother of God in Yeghegnadzor, 12th century

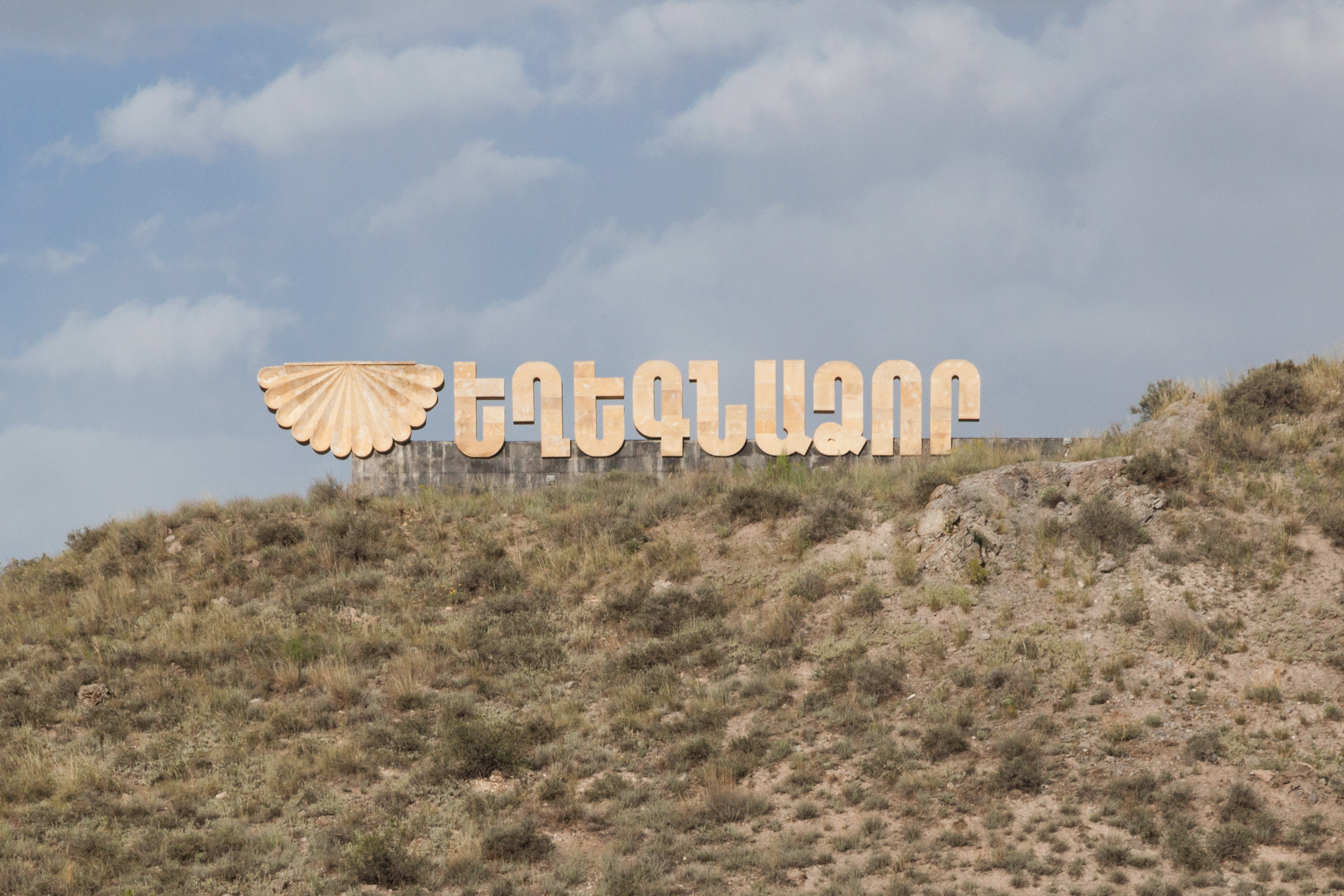
The entrance to Yeghegnadzor

The settlement was first mentioned as Pondzatagh during the 5th century. Historically, it belongs to the Vayots Dzor canton of Syunik; the 9th province of Greater Armenia (Armenia Major). However, the excavated layer of a cemetery and the remains of a mausoleum from the 1st millennium BC testify that the area has been settled long before the 5th century. The remains of the Urartian fortress near the town dates back to the 7th century BC.

According to historical records from the 1st quarter of the 9th century, when Syunats Prince Philip, son of Vasak, moved his residence from Sisian to Vayots Dzor and fortified in Yeghegis, the name Yeghegnadzor or Yeghegyats Dzor' spread across the entire province. During the Middle Ages, the Silk Road passed through the area of Vayots Dzor, particularly the road that currently links the town of Martuni with Yeghegnadzor. Many significant churches, monastic complexes, bridges and caravanserais were built in the region between the 10th and 13th centuries, when Yeghegnadzor was part of the Kingdom of Syunik under the rule of the Siunia dynasty.

At the beginning of the 16th century, Eastern Armenia fell under the Safavid Persian rule. The territory of Yeghegnadzor became part of the Erivan Beglarbegi and later the Erivan Khanate. The period between the 16th and 17th centuries is considered to be the darkest period in the history of Yeghegnadzor. The region was turned into a frequent battlefield between the invading troops of the Turkic and Iranian tribes. As a result, many significant monuments and prosperous villages were destroyed and the population was displaced. In 1747, Yeghegnadzor became part of the newly-formed Nakhichevan Khanate. By the beginning of the 19th century, Yeghegnadzor was known as Keshishkend.

As a result of the Russo-Persian War of 1826–28 and the subsequent Treaty of Turkmenchay, much of historical Eastern Armenia – including Vayots Dzor – became part of the Russian Empire. In 1870, Keshishkend became part of the newly-formed Sharur-Daralayaz uezd of the Erivan Governorate within Russian Transcaucasia. Between 1918 and 1920, the town was included in the short-lived First Republic of Armenia. After Armenia's Sovietization, it became the center of the Daralagyaz uezd of the Armenian SSR.

The name Keshishkend remained until January 3, 1935, when the town was renamed Mikoyan after the Soviet Armenian statesman Anastas Mikoyan. On December 6, 1957, the town was renamed Yeghegnadzor, restoring its historical name. Notably, Mikoyan himself visited the town with Anton Kochinyan and other Soviet Armenian leaders in the 1960s.

Following the independence of Armenia in 1991, Yeghegnadzor became the capital of the newly-formed Vayots Dzor Province as per the 1995 administrative reforms.

== Geography and climate ==
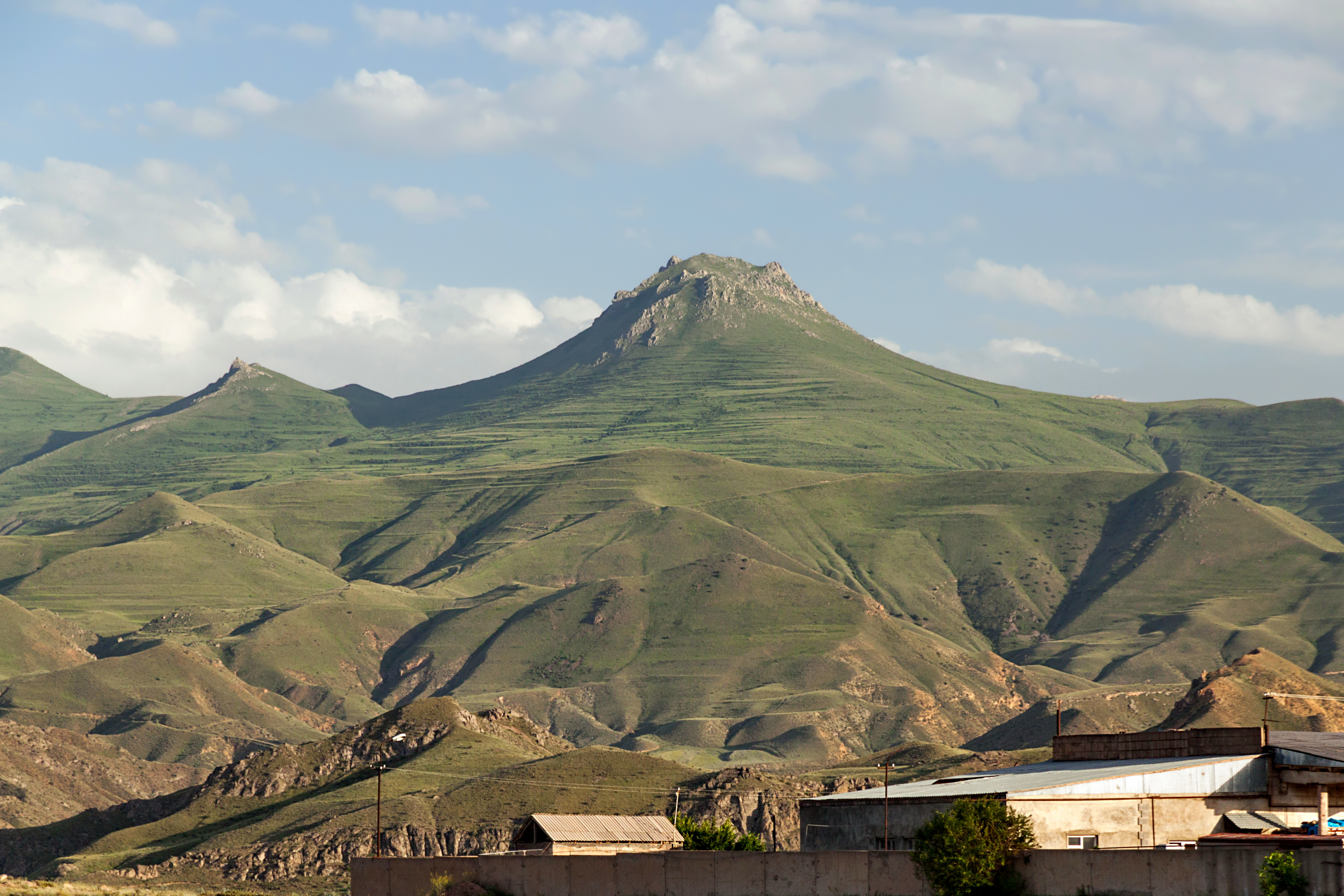
Landscapes seen from the M-2 Motorway near Yeghegnadzor

Yeghegnadzor is situated at 1,194 metres above sea level. The lower and medium highlands are mainly semi-deserts. It is built across the right and left banks of the Srkghonk River, a tributary of the Arpa River. The town is immediately bordered by the village of Gladzor from the north.

Yeghegnadzor has a hot-summer humid continental climate (Köppen Dfa) bordering upon a cool semi-arid climate (BSk). Yeghegnadzor features large diurnal temperature fluctuations, an average annual rainfall of 370 millimetres or 15 inches, and mountain-valley winds. The average air temperature in January is −3.2 °C or 26.2 °F, with a coldest temperature of −22 °C or −7.6 °F, whilst the highest is 35 °C or 95 °F in July.

Climate data for Yeghegnadzor
Month	Jan	Feb	Mar	Apr	May	Jun	Jul	Aug	Sep	Oct	Nov	Dec	Year
Mean daily maximum °C (°F)	0.9 (33.6)	3.0 (37.4)	9.5 (49.1)	16.4 (61.5)	21.1 (70.0)	26.0 (78.8)	30.3 (86.5)	29.5 (85.1)	25.9 (78.6)	18.7 (65.7)	10.8 (51.4)	4.1 (39.4)	16.3 (61.4)
Daily mean °C (°F)	−3.2 (26.2)	−1.4 (29.5)	4.2 (39.6)	10.4 (50.7)	14.8 (58.6)	19.2 (66.6)	23.1 (73.6)	22.4 (72.3)	18.5 (65.3)	12.3 (54.1)	5.7 (42.3)	0.1 (32.2)	10.5 (50.9)
Mean daily minimum °C (°F)	−7.3 (18.9)	−5.7 (21.7)	−1.0 (30.2)	4.4 (39.9)	8.6 (47.5)	12.4 (54.3)	16.0 (60.8)	15.4 (59.7)	11.2 (52.2)	5.9 (42.6)	0.7 (33.3)	−3.9 (25.0)	4.7 (40.5)
Average precipitation mm (inches)	17 (0.7)	20 (0.8)	35 (1.4)	45 (1.8)	62 (2.4)	47 (1.9)	31 (1.2)	19 (0.7)	18 (0.7)	30 (1.2)	25 (1.0)	19 (0.7)	368 (14.5)
Source: Climate-Data.org

The surrounding areas of the town are home to some mammals including bezoar ibex, wolf and fox; reptiles including adder and viper; and birds including partridge and sparrow.

== Demographics ==
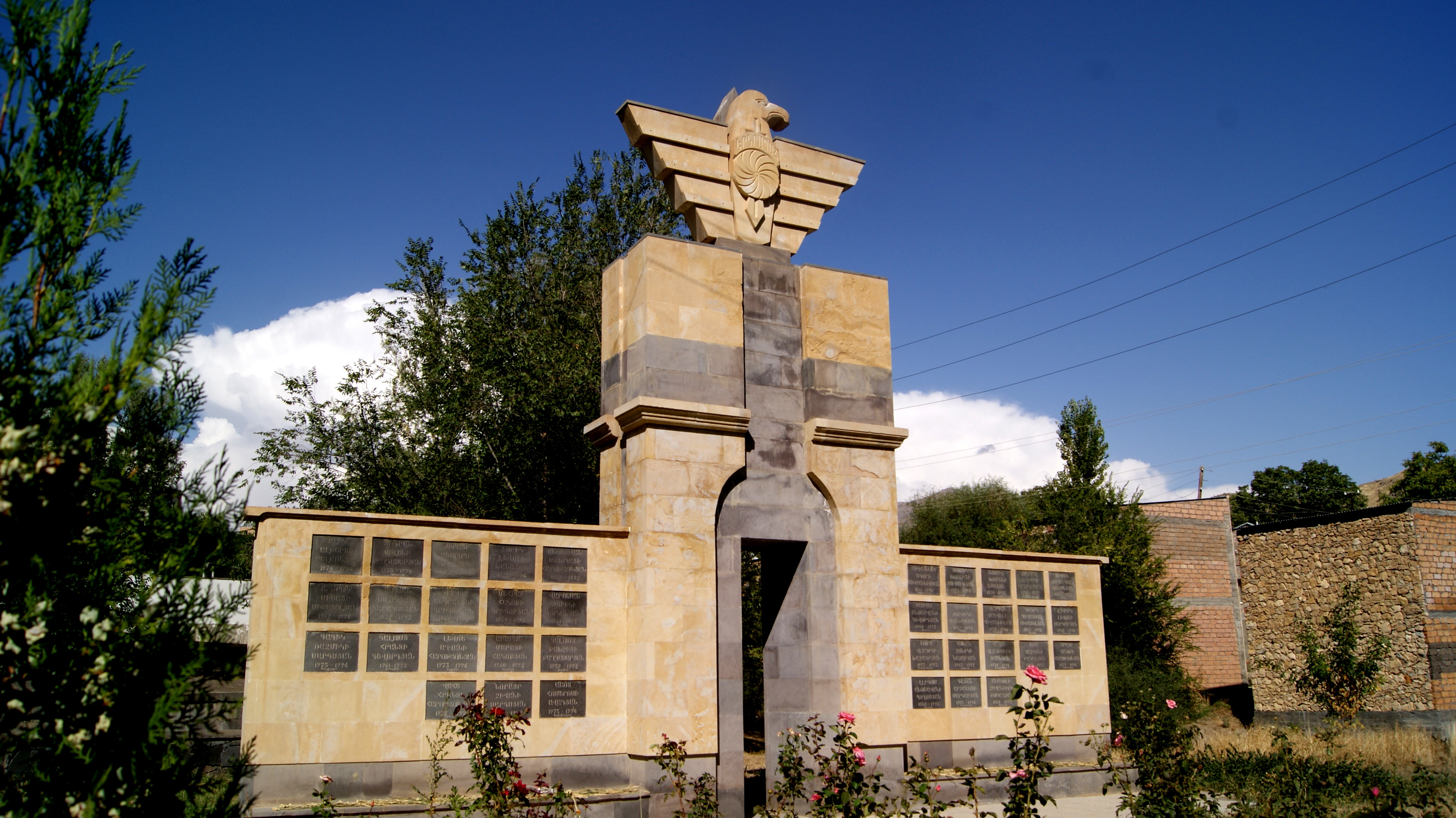
Memorial to the victims of the First Nagorno-Karabakh War in nearby village of Malishka

Historical population
Year	Pop.	±% p.a.
1831	332	—
1897	1,307	+2.10%
1914	1,371	+0.28%
1926	1,583	+1.21%
1939	2,567	+3.79%
1959	3,567	+1.66%
1980	7,053	+3.30%
2001	8,178	+0.71%
2011	7,944	−0.29%
2022	6,912	−1.26%

== Culture ==
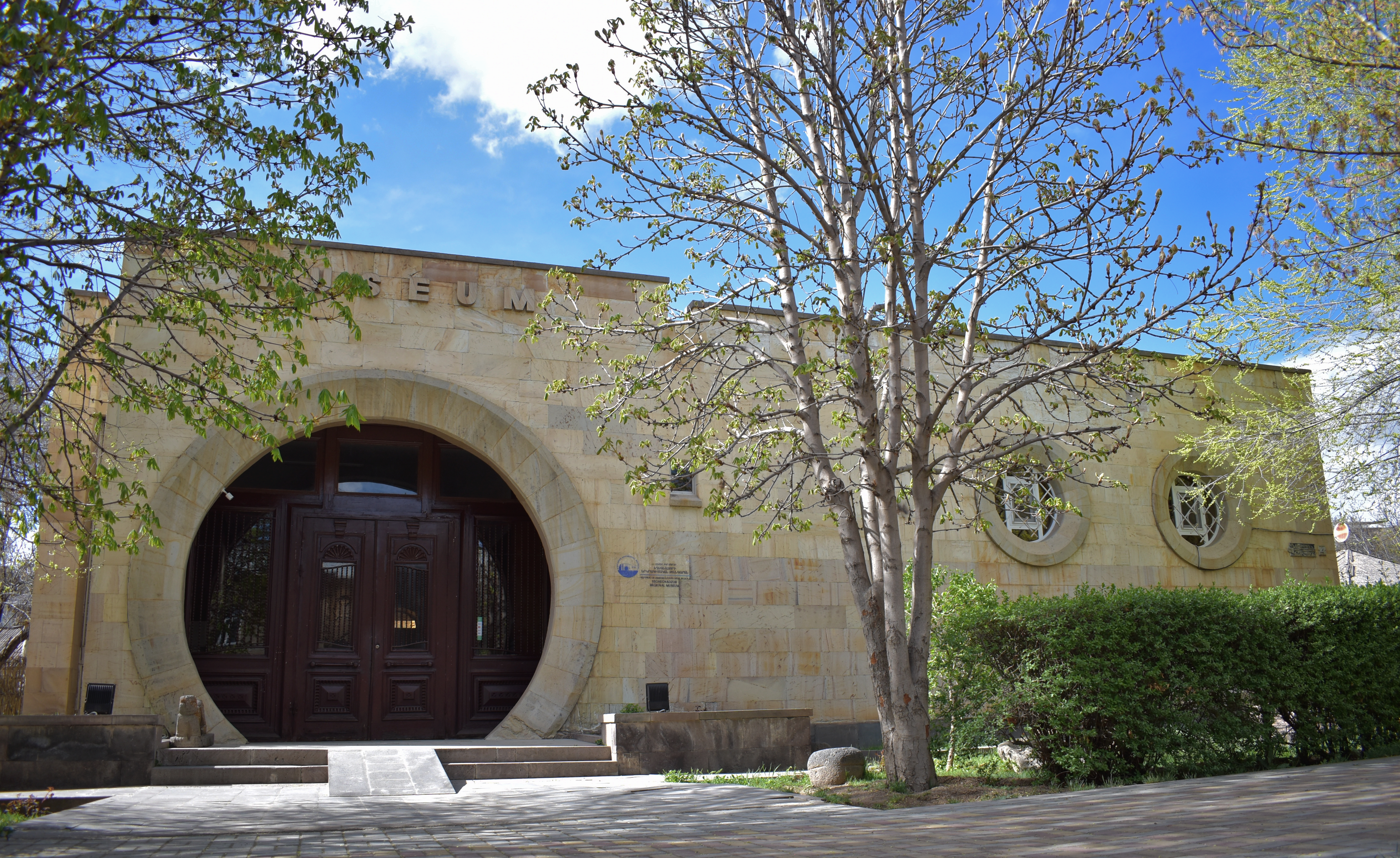
Yeghegnadzor Regional Museum

Yeghegnadzor is the largest town and the cultural centre of Vayots Dzor Province. It has a cultural palace, a public library and a regional museum. The town is also home to an art school, a sports school and a musical academy. There is an amphitheater in the Momik public park at the centre of the town. The park is also home to a vishapakar (dragon stone) dating back to the 2nd millennium BC.

As in other parts of Armenia, the people of Yeghegnadzor celebrate traditional Armenian religious festivals, such as Trndez and Vardavar. However, the most popular celebration in the town is the harvest festival, taking place every year on the second Sunday of October. Locals from all villages take part in the parade on cars decorated with flowers, bringing their own crops, berries typical to their territories. Theatrical shows and concerts are held during the festival.

Yeghegnadzor is also known for horats panir (buried cheese). Horats panir is made from pasteurized cow's or goat's milk (or both) and mixed with local greens. It is stored in individual clay pots, then buried in the mountains and left to mature for at least six months before consumption. The flavors are strong, sharp, and salty, while the addition of mountain greens gives the cheese even more unique flavors. The texture is semi-soft, and crumbly.

=== Monuments ===
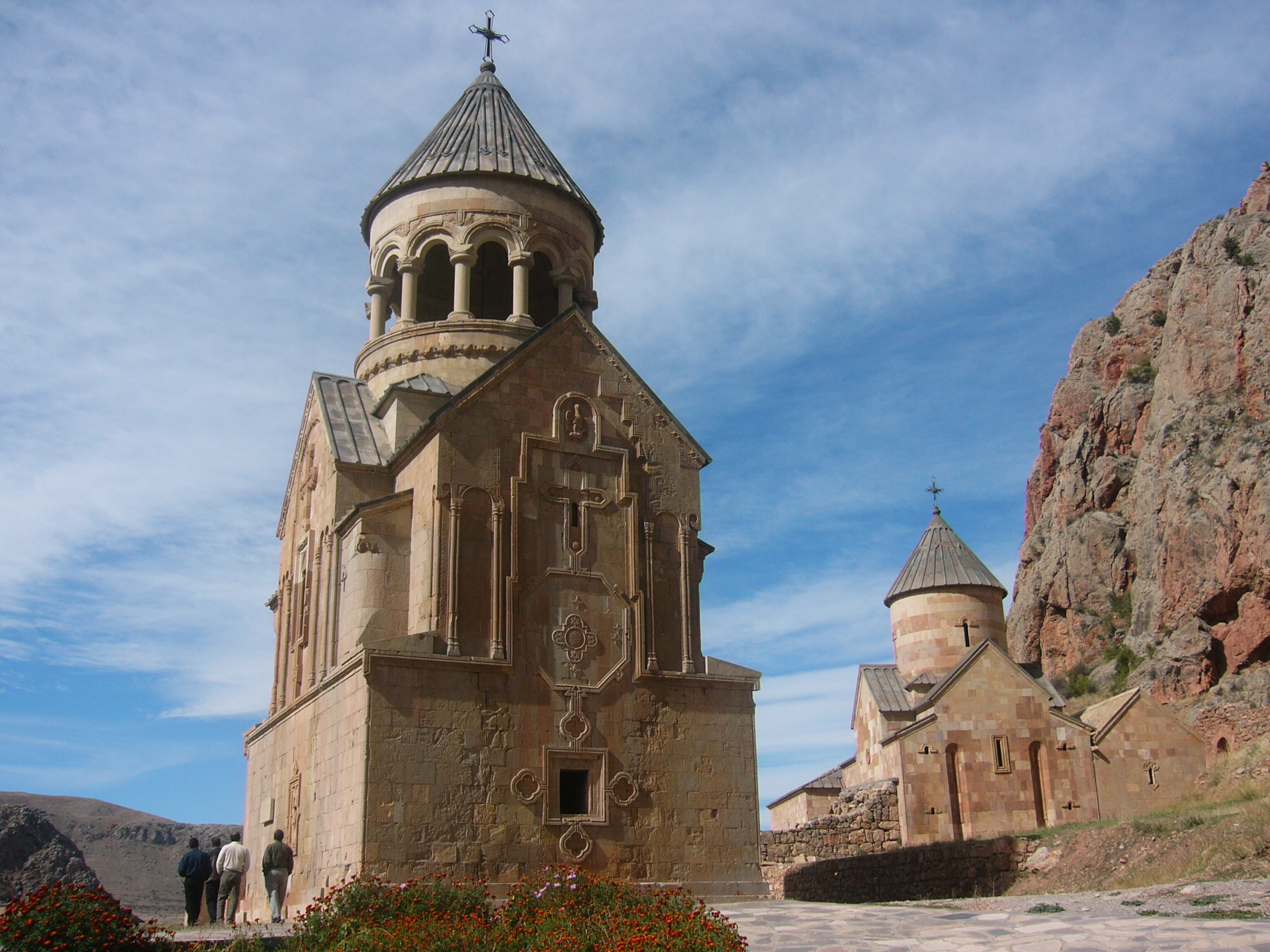
Noravank monastic complex

- Cathedral of the Holy Mother of God, formerly known as Surp Sarkis church, built in the 12th century and renovated in 1878. The basilica is located at the center of Yeghegnadzor and serves as the seat of the Vayots Dzor Diocese of the Armenian Apostolic Church.
- Proshaberd fortress (Boloraberd fortress) of the 13th century, located few kilometers to the north-east of Yeghegnadzor, near the villages of Gladzor and Vernashen.
- The historic University of Gladzor of the 13th century, located in the village of Gladzor at the outskirts of Yeghegnadzor.
- Agarakadzor bridge, 13th century.
- Noravank monastic complex of the 13th century, located few kilometers away from Yeghegnadzor, to the southwest of the town.
- Spitakavor Monastery of the Holy Mother of God built in 1321, located just to the north of Yeghegnadzor near the village of Vernashen.

=== Media ===
"Vardadzor" monthly is the regional newspaper of Vayots Dzor. It is being published in Yeghegnadzor since 15 November 2002. It covers political, economical and regional news. It also has a literary supplement.

== Transportation ==
The M-2 Motorway that connect Armenia from north to south, passes through the town.

On the other hand, Yeghegnadzor is domestically connected with other parts of Vayots Dzor through the H-40 and H-47 Roads.

== Economy ==
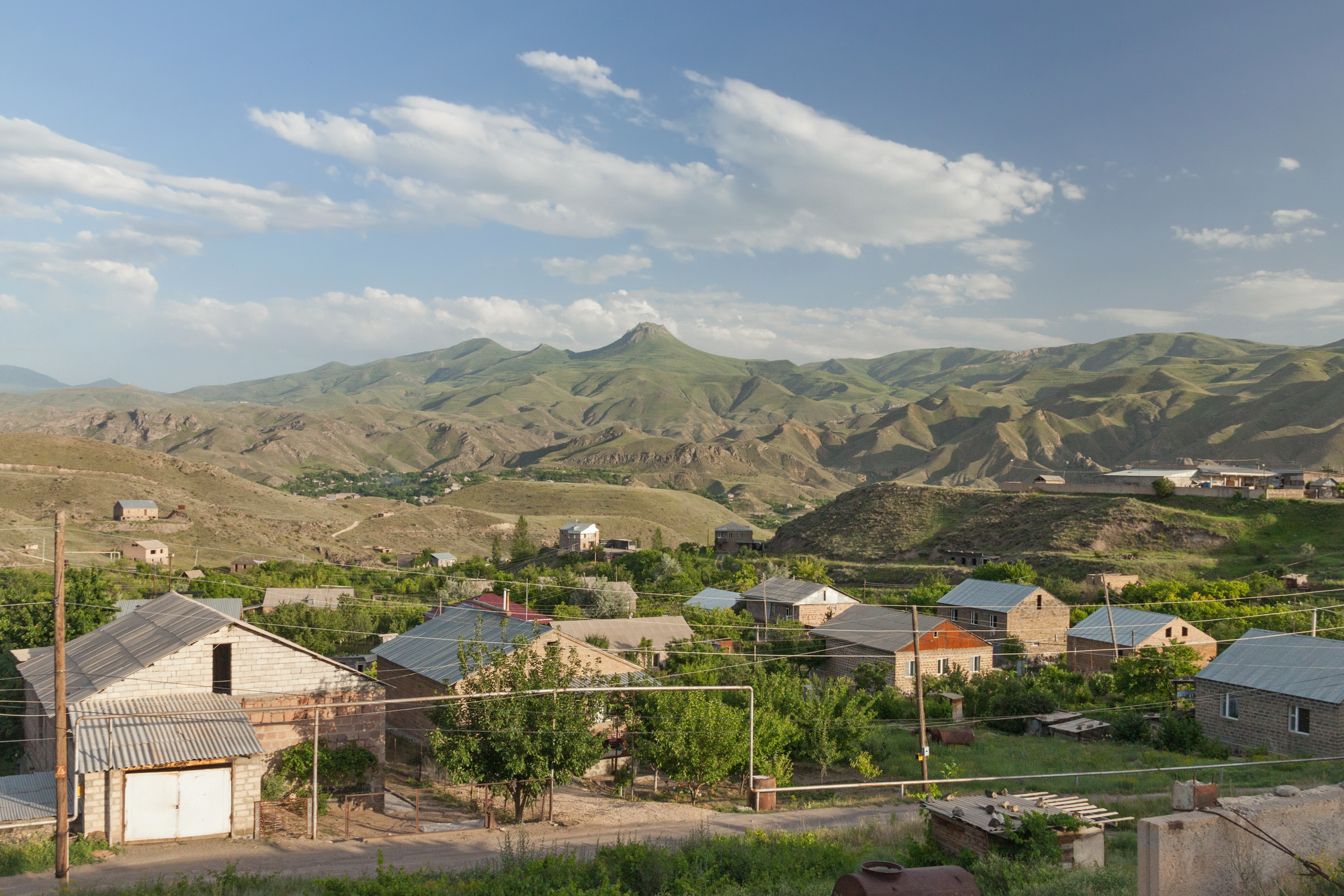
View of Yeghegnadzor

The economy of the town is based on the construction sector and food-processing industry. Among the largest food-processing plants of the town are the Maran Winery opened in 1992, Old Bridge Winery opened in 1998, Getnatoun Winery opened in 1999, Golden Goat cheese factory opened in 2000, Selim LLC for dairy products founded in 2002, and Yeghegndazor Cannery opened in 2015.

The town is also home to many other industrial firms including the "Rafelgrig" for electrical products founded in 1968 and the "Izoton" company for oak-wood made barrels for wine and brandy aging founded in 2003. Light productions of building materials, textile, hand-made carpet and jewellery are also found in the town.

During the Soviet period, Yeghegnadzor used to be one of the industrial centres of the Armenian SSR. The relay factory of Yeghegnadzor used to accommodate 1100 workers, the knitwear factory used to accommodate more than 500 workers, while the shoe factory had around 200 workers.

Agriculture, including farming, cattle-breeding and bee-keeping are found in the suburbs of Yeghegnadzor.

== Education ==
In 2004, the Gitelik Yeghegnadzor University was opened in the town. As of 2016, it has 12 faculties.

The Yeghegnadzor campus of the Armenian State University of Economics is operating since 2008.

As of 2016, there are 4 public schools as well as 3 kindergartens operating in Yeghegnadzor.

The Royal Victorian University Educational Foundation of Armenia (RVU) is based in Yeghegnadzor.

== Sport ==
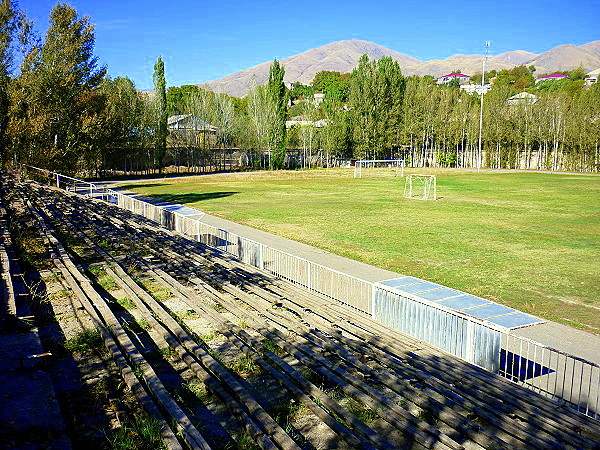
Yeghegnadzor City Stadium

Arpa FC of Yeghegnadzor -founded as Momik FC in 1992- used to represent the town in the Armenian Premier League football competition. Like many other Armenian football clubs, Arpa FC was dissolved in early 2003 and is currently inactive from professional football.

The Yeghegnadzor City Stadium opened in 1985, is able to accommodate around 500 spectators.

== Notable people ==
- Kamsar (Kamo Sahakyan), renowned Armenian painter
- Jaklin Baghdasaryan, Armenian singer

== See also ==
- Syunik (historic province)
- Siunia dynasty
- Noravank
- Spitakavor Monastery

== Bibliography ==
- Հայաստանի Հանրապետության բնակավայրերի բառարան [Republic of Armenia Settlements Dictionary] (PDF) (in Armenian). Yerevan: Cadastre Committee of the Republic of Armenia. 2008. Archived from the original (PDF) on 11 March 2018.
- Piruzyan, Aram S. (1960). Армянская кулинария [Armenian Cooking] (PDF) (in Russian). Moscow: Gostorgizdat.
- Shakarian, Pietro A. (2025). Anastas Mikoyan: An Armenian Reformer in Khrushchev's Kremlin. Bloomington: Indiana University Press. ISBN 978-0253073556.
