= Keşişkənd =

Keshishkend
- Azerbaijani: Keşişkənd
- Location within Azerbaijan
- Coordinates: 40°44′39″N 45°43′58″E
- Country: Azerbaijan
- District: Gadabay
- Time zone: UTC+4 (AZT)
  - Summer (DST): UTC+5 (AZT)

Keşişkənd (also, Keshishkend) is a village in the Gadabay District of Azerbaijan.
