= Karakaya =

Karakaya may refer to:

== Places ==
- Dzoravank, Armenia
- Gharaghaya, Armenia
- Karakaya Dam, a dam on the Euphrates River in Diyarbakır Province, Turkey
- Karakaya, Altıeylül, a village
- Karakaya, Araç, a village in Araç District of Kastamonu Province, Turkey
- Karakaya, Bayat
- Karakaya, Çal
- Karakaya, Çermik
- Karakaya, Çüngüş
- Karakaya, Dursunbey, a village
- Karakaya, Gümüşhacıköy, a village in Gümüşhacıköy district of Amasya Province, Turkey
- Karakaya, İliç
- Karakaya, İspir
- Karakaya, İscehisar, a village in İscehisar district of Afyonkarahisar Province, Turkey
- Karakaya, Karayazı
- Karakaya, Manavgat, a village in Manavgat district of Antalya Province, Turkey
- Karakaya, Mengen, a village Mengen district of Bolu Province, Turkey
- Karakaya, Polatlı, a village in Polatlı district of Ankara Province, Turkey
- Karakaya, Silifke, a village in Silifke district of Mersin Province, Turkey
- Karakaya, Söke, a village in Söke district of Aydın Province, Turkey
- Karakaya, Sungurlu
- Karakaya, Üzümlü
- Karakaya (Skalisty Range)
- Qaraqaya, Ismailli, Azerbaijan
- Qaraqaya, Yardymli, Azerbaijan

== Other uses ==
- Karakaya (surname)
