= Chirakhlu =

- Location within Armenia
- Coordinates: 39°41′17″N 45°36′02″E
- Country: Armenia
- Marz (Province): Vayots Dzor
- Time zone: UTC+4 ( )

Chirakhlu, is an abandoned village in the Vayots Dzor Province of Armenia.

== See also ==
- Vayots Dzor Province
