= Qaraqaya =

Qaraqaya or Qaragaya may refer to:

- Qaraqaya, Ismailli, Azerbaijan
- Qaraqaya, Yardymli, Azerbaijan
