= Aghavnadzor, Vayots Dzor =

Aghavnadzor Աղավնաձոր
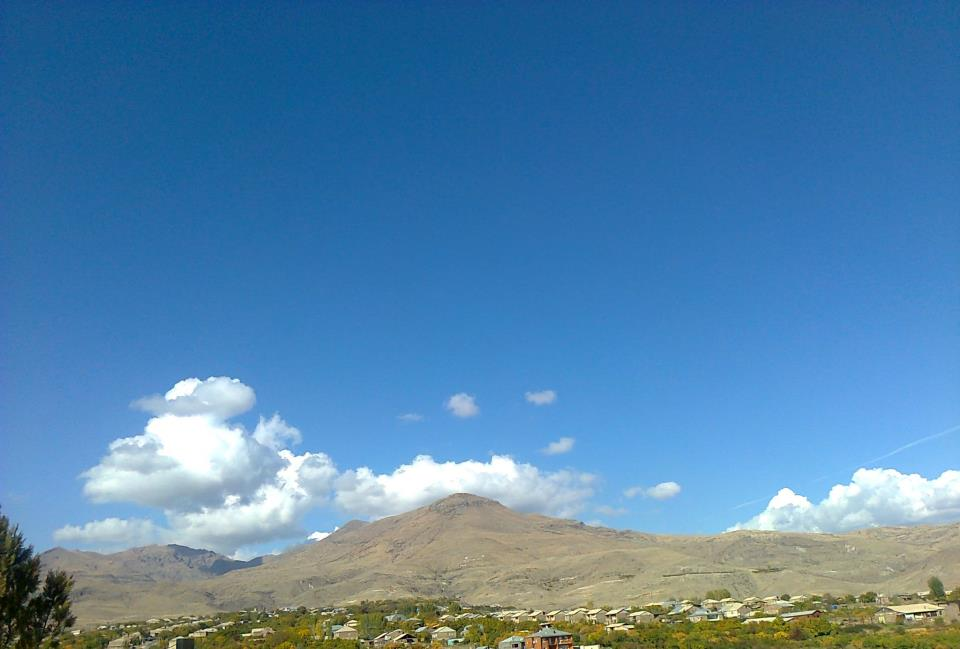

- Location within Armenia Location within Vayots Dzor
- Coordinates: 39°47′01″N 45°13′41″E
- Country: Armenia
- Province: Vayots Dzor
- Municipality: Areni

Population (2011)
  - Total: 1,890
- Time zone: UTC+4 (AMT)

Aghavnadzor (Armenian: Աղավնաձոր) is a village in the Areni Municipality of the Vayots Dzor Province in Armenia.

== Toponymy ==
The village was previously known as Aynadzor and Aynazur.

== Historical heritage sites ==
The 12th-century church of Saint Astvatsatsin is 4 km northeast of Aghavnadzor, with a funerary monument from the year 1009 nearby. The ruins of a caravanserai are located 4 km to the northwest, and 4 km north is the 13th to 14th-century Ul Gyughi church. The 13th-century Aghjkaberd fortress is located 1 km east of the village.

== Gallery ==
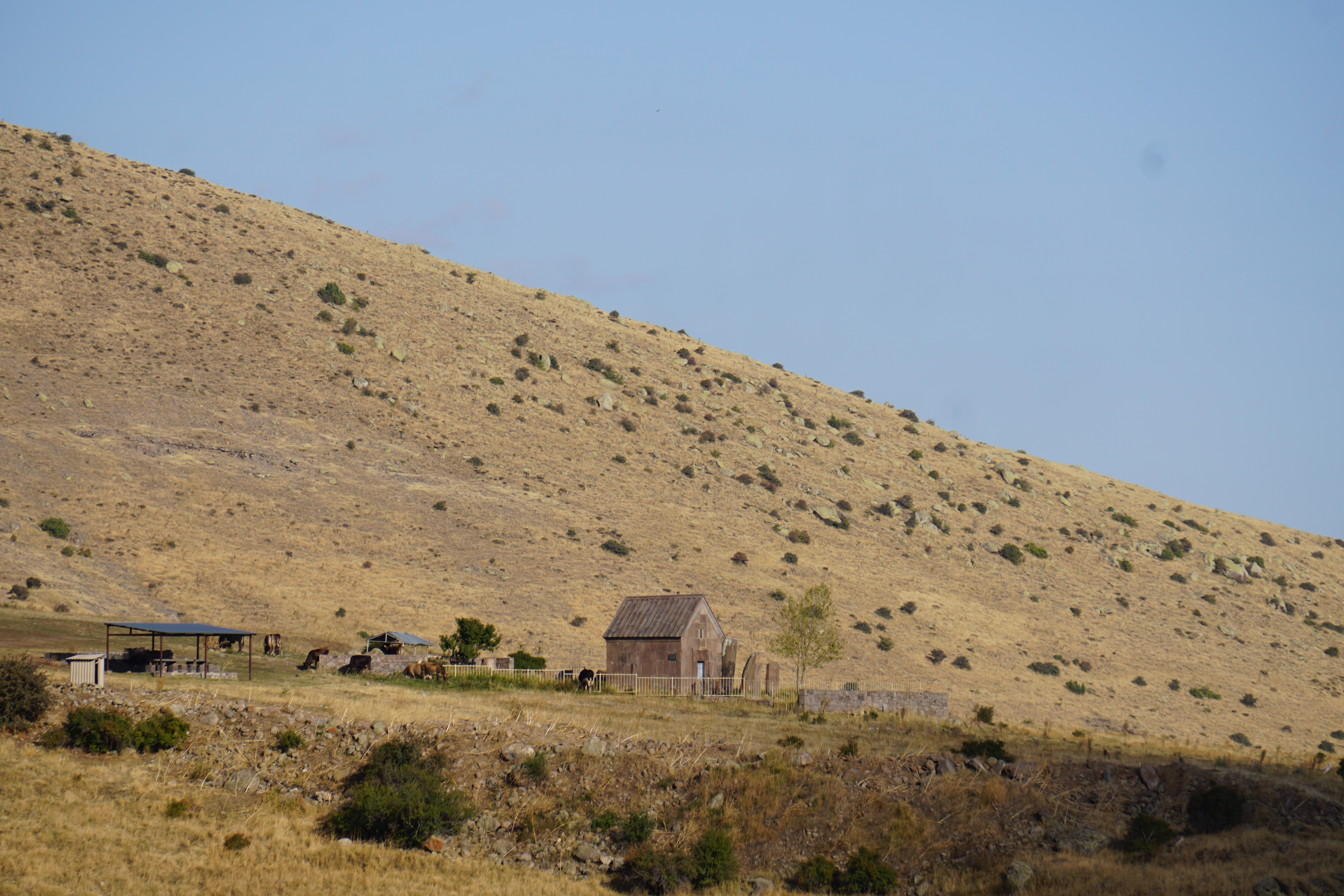
Scenery around St. Holy Mother of God Church

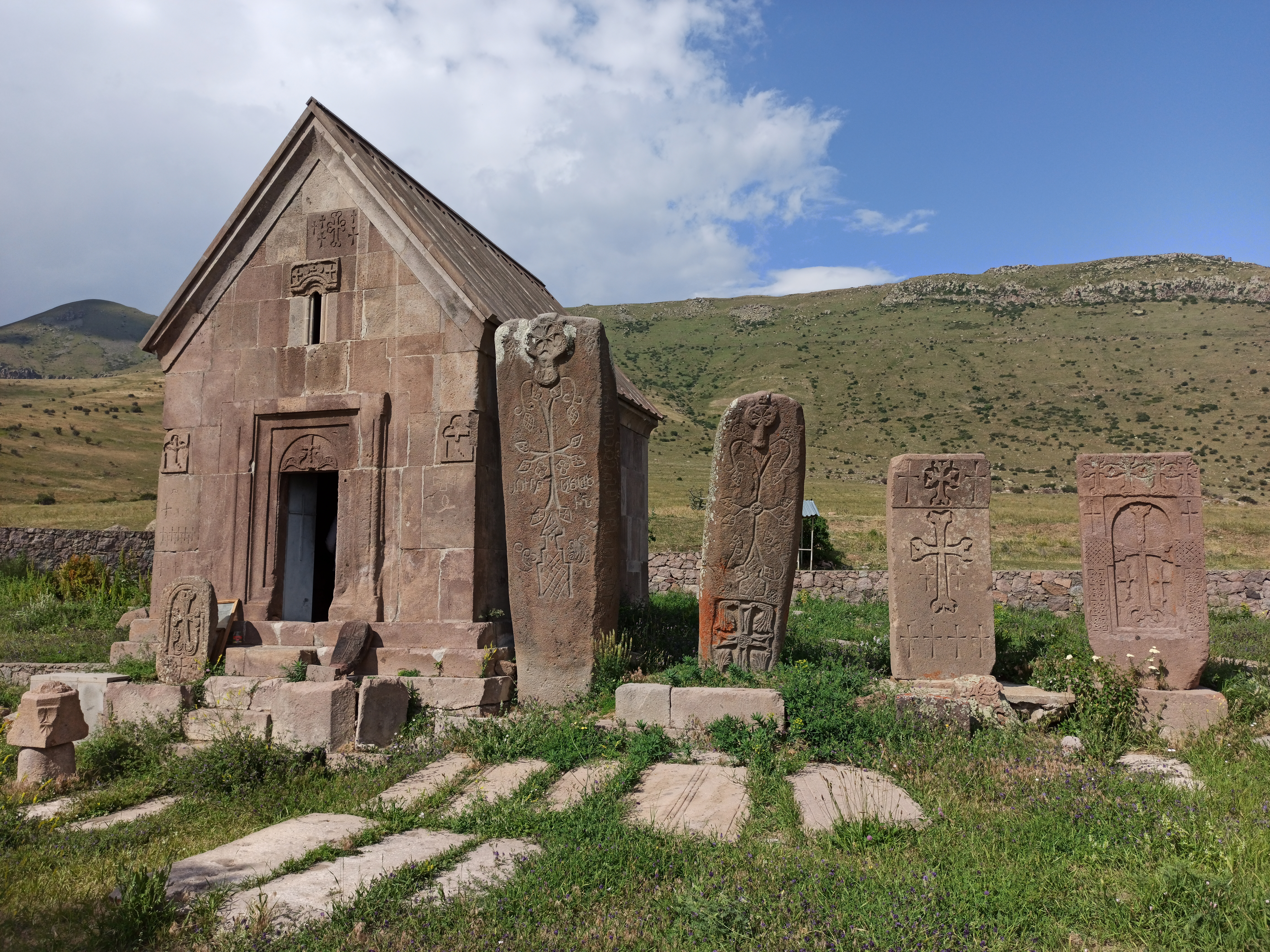
St. Holy Mother of God Church

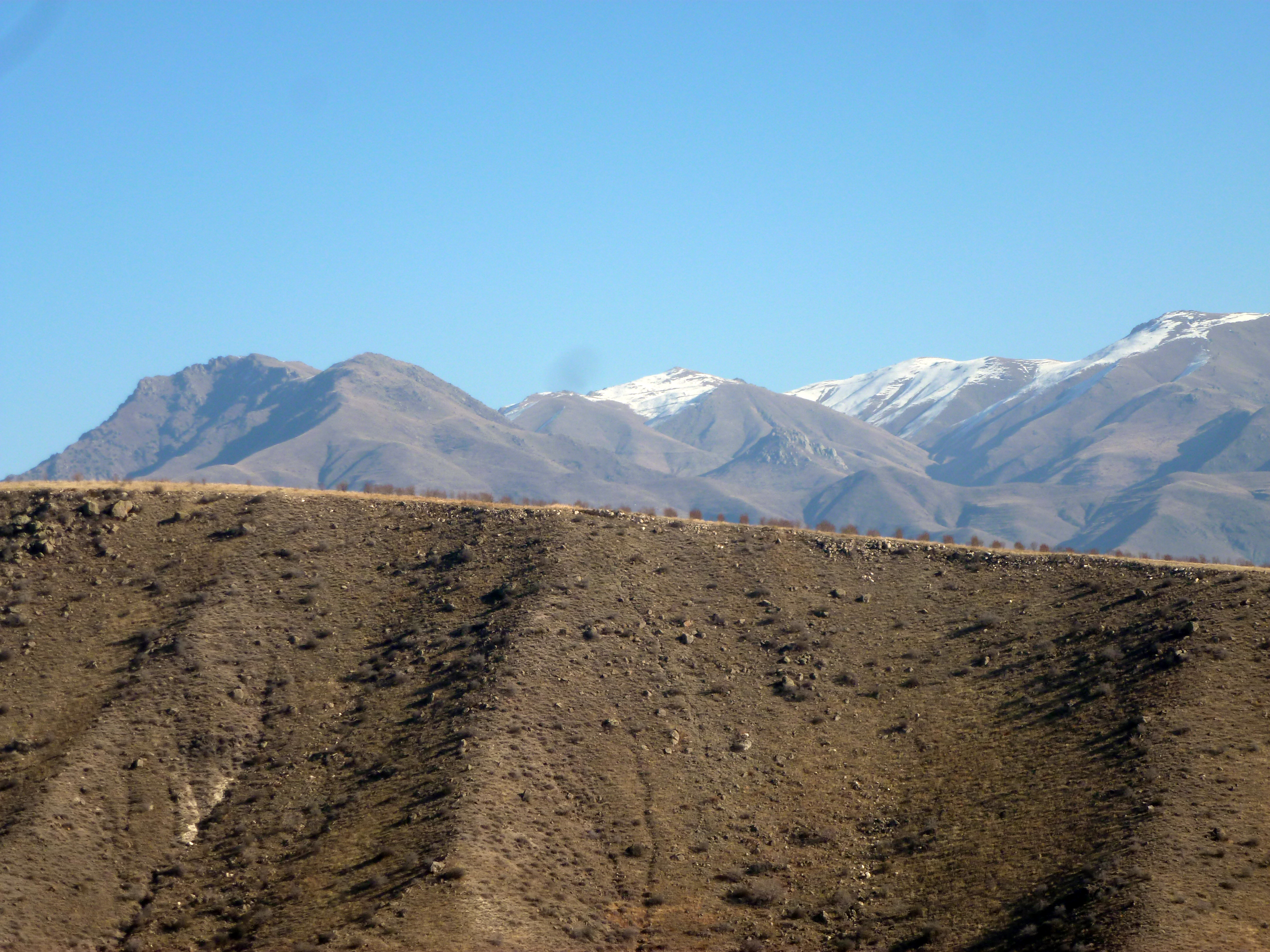
Scenery around Aghavnadzor

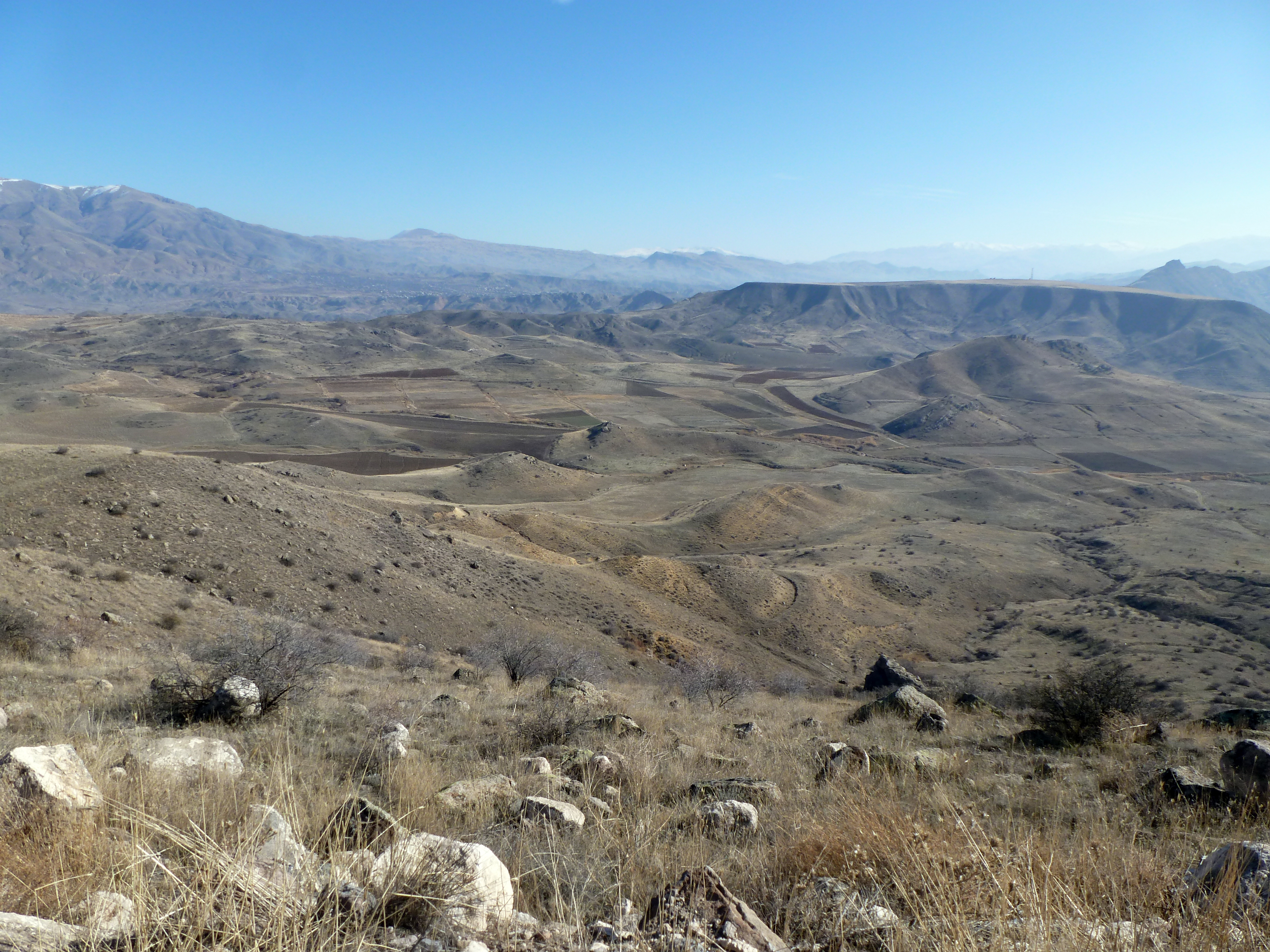
Scenery around Aghavnadzor

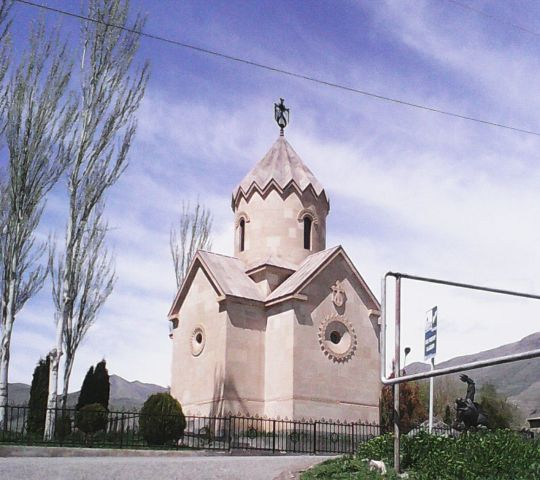
St. Mary Church
