= Karmrashen, Vayots Dzor =

Karmrashen Կարմրաշեն
- Location within Armenia Location within Vayots Dzor
- Coordinates: 39°48′59″N 45°31′50″E
- Country: Armenia
- Province: Vayots Dzor
- Municipality: Vayk
- Elevation: 2,065 m (6,775 ft)

Population (2011)
  - Total: 252
- Time zone: UTC+4 (AMT)

Karmrashen (Armenian: Կարմրաշեն) is a village in the Vayk Municipality of the Vayots Dzor Province of Armenia.

== History ==
The village has khachkars dating back to the 10-13th century. From 1963 the village was used as a construction site for the construction of the Arpa-Sevan tunnel. Upon a hill to the east are the ruins of a small church, and 1.5 km southwest are the ruins of two other churches. One kilometre south of Karmrashen is a carved votive to Saints Peter and Paul (S. Poghos Petros), set up by Prince Elikum Orbelian in the year 1291.
