= List of Armenian provinces by Human Development Index =

Map of Armenian provinces by Human Development Index in 2017. Legend: > 0.760 0.750 – 0.760 0.740 – 0.750 0.730 – 0.740 < 0.730

This is a list of Armenian provinces (marzer) by Human Development Index as of 2023, including Yerevan, the capital and largest city.

Rank	Province	HDI (2023)
Very high human development
1	Yerevan	0.858
–	Armenia	0.811
2	Kotayk	0.817
3	Shirak	0.809
4	Tavush	0.805
5	Syunik	0.802
High human development
6	Ararat	0.788
7	Vayots Dzor	0.787
8	Lori	0.786
9	Armavir	0.784
10	Aragatsotn	0.782
11	Gegharkunik	0.756
