= Hostun, Armenia =

Abandoned settlement and archaeological site in Armenia

Hostun
- Հոստուն (Armenian)
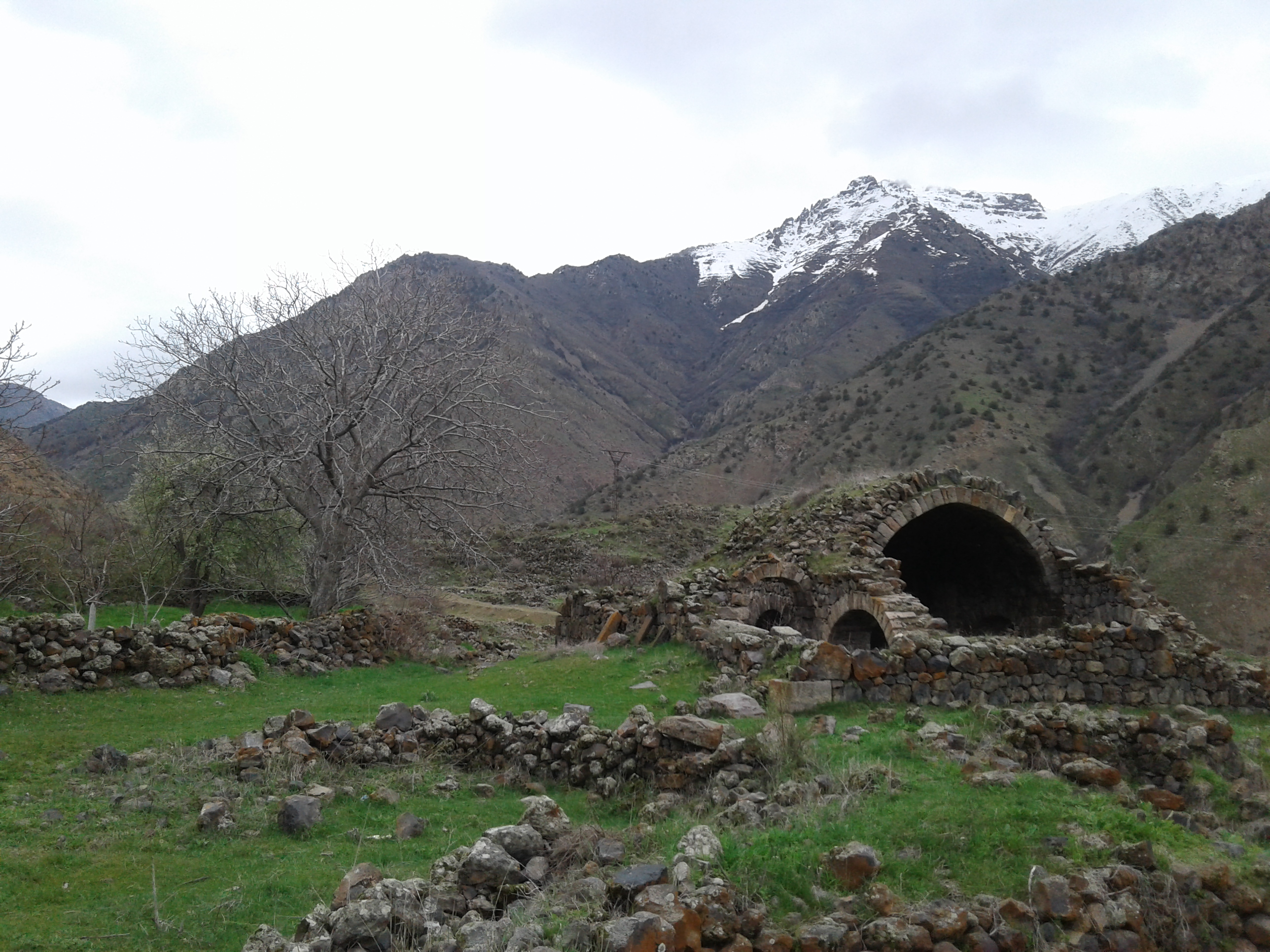
- The settlement site of Hostun
- Type: Settlement
- Periods: Medieval period
- Location: Near Yeghegis, Vayots Dzor Province

Site notes
- Condition: Ruined

Hostun (Armenian: Հոստուն), also known as Vostink (Armenian: Ոստինք), is an abandoned settlement and archaeological site in Vayots Dzor Province, Armenia. It is situated approximately 4 km (2.5 mi) west of the village of Yeghegis, on the right bank of the Yeghegis River.

The settlement was located close to the medieval town of Yeghegis and may have served as one of its suburbs during the rule of the Orbelian dynasty. The ruins of the nearby Vostanik fortress-settlement are also located in the area. Armenia's official register of immovable historical and cultural monuments dates the Hostun settlement complex to between the 5th and 17th centuries. Hostun remained inhabited into the modern period and was abandoned during the 1950s.

== Archaeology ==
Partial excavations were conducted at Hostun in 2005 and 2006 under the direction of archaeologist Ashot Piliposyan. The excavations revealed archaeological layers dating from the 9th–11th, 13th–14th, 16th–17th and 19th centuries.

The discovered objects included fragments of decorated storage vessels, glazed and red pottery, glass bracelets and coins dating from the 14th to the 16th centuries. In 2011, 235 objects discovered at Hostun were selected for an archaeological exhibition in Yerevan before being transferred to the Geological Museum of Yeghegnadzor.

Two cemeteries and the ruins of a church survive within the settlement.

== Church ==
The church in the central part of Hostun is a ruined three-aisled basilica reconstructed during the 17th and 18th centuries. Its interior contains four piers and a semicircular eastern apse, while a gavit adjoins the building on its western side. The entrance is located in the southern wall.

The church was constructed from undressed stone joined with lime mortar. Dressed stones and khachkars from an earlier church were reused in its construction, including a khachkar dated to 1251.

== See also ==
- Yeghegis
- Vayots Dzor Province
