= Gyadikvank =

- Location within Armenia Location within Vayots Dzor
- Coordinates: 39°55′33″N 45°30′41″E
- Country: Armenia
- Marz (Province): Vayots Dzor
- Time zone: UTC+4 ( )
  - Summer (DST): UTC+5 ( )

Gyadikvank (also, Gyadikvank’, Koturvan, Kodukh-Vank, Gyadigvank) is a former town in the Vayots Dzor Province of Armenia.

== See also ==
- Vayots Dzor Province
