= Vayots Dzor Province =

Province of Armenia

Vayots Dzor Վայոց Ձոր
- Province
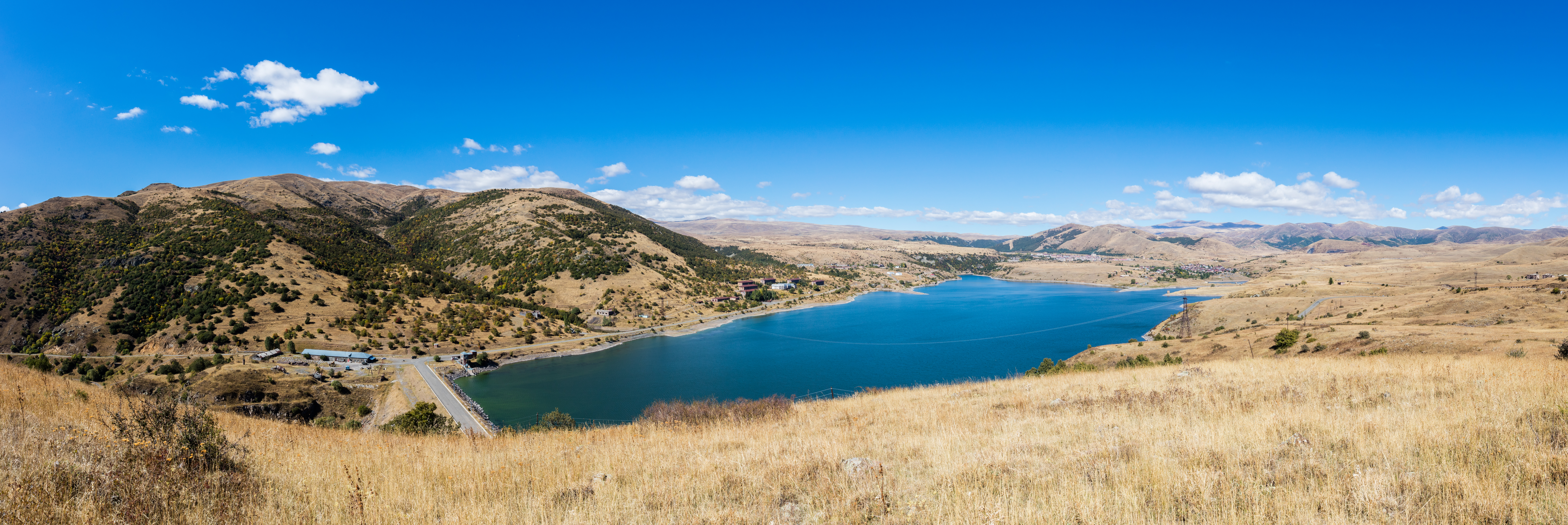
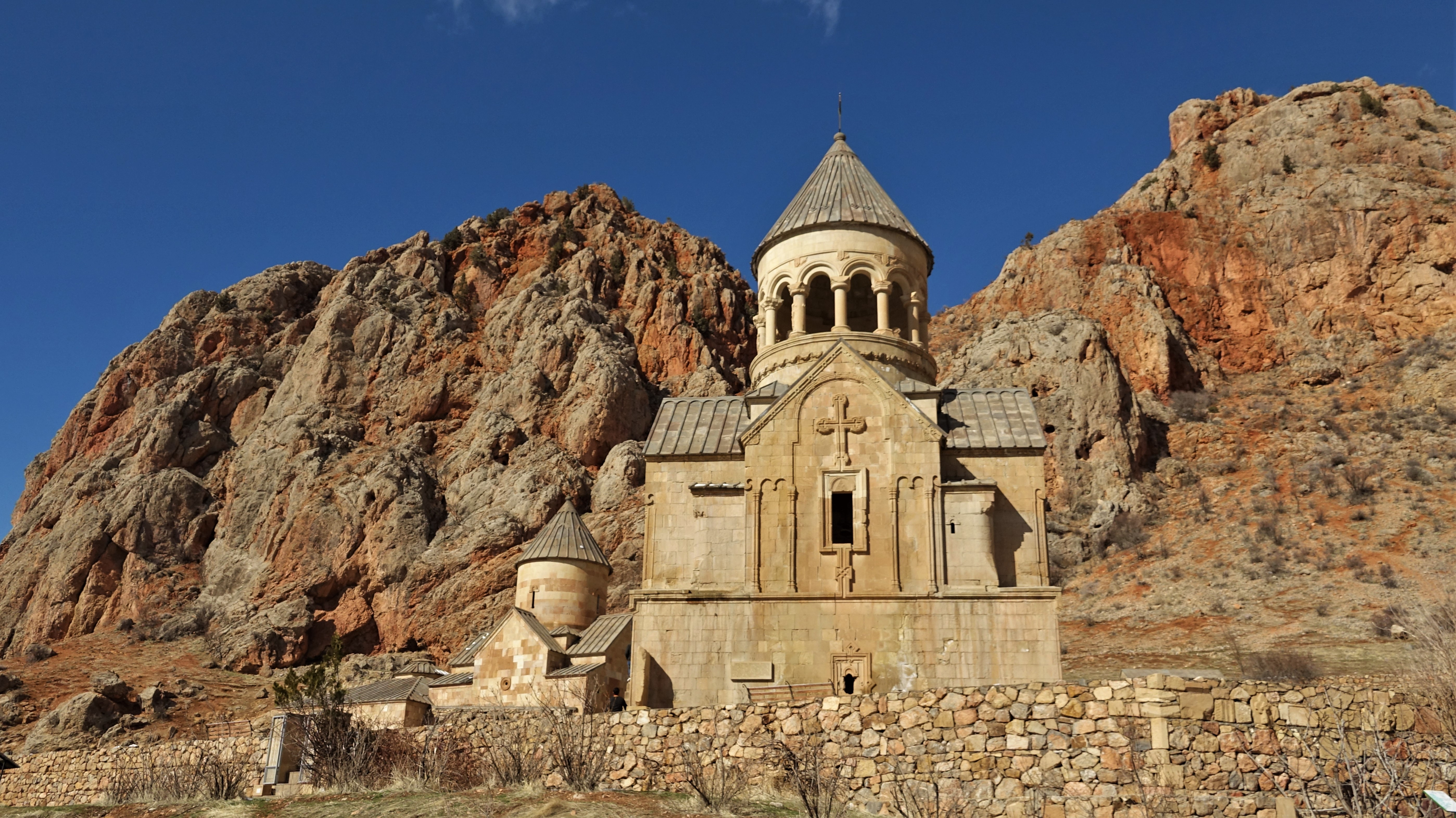
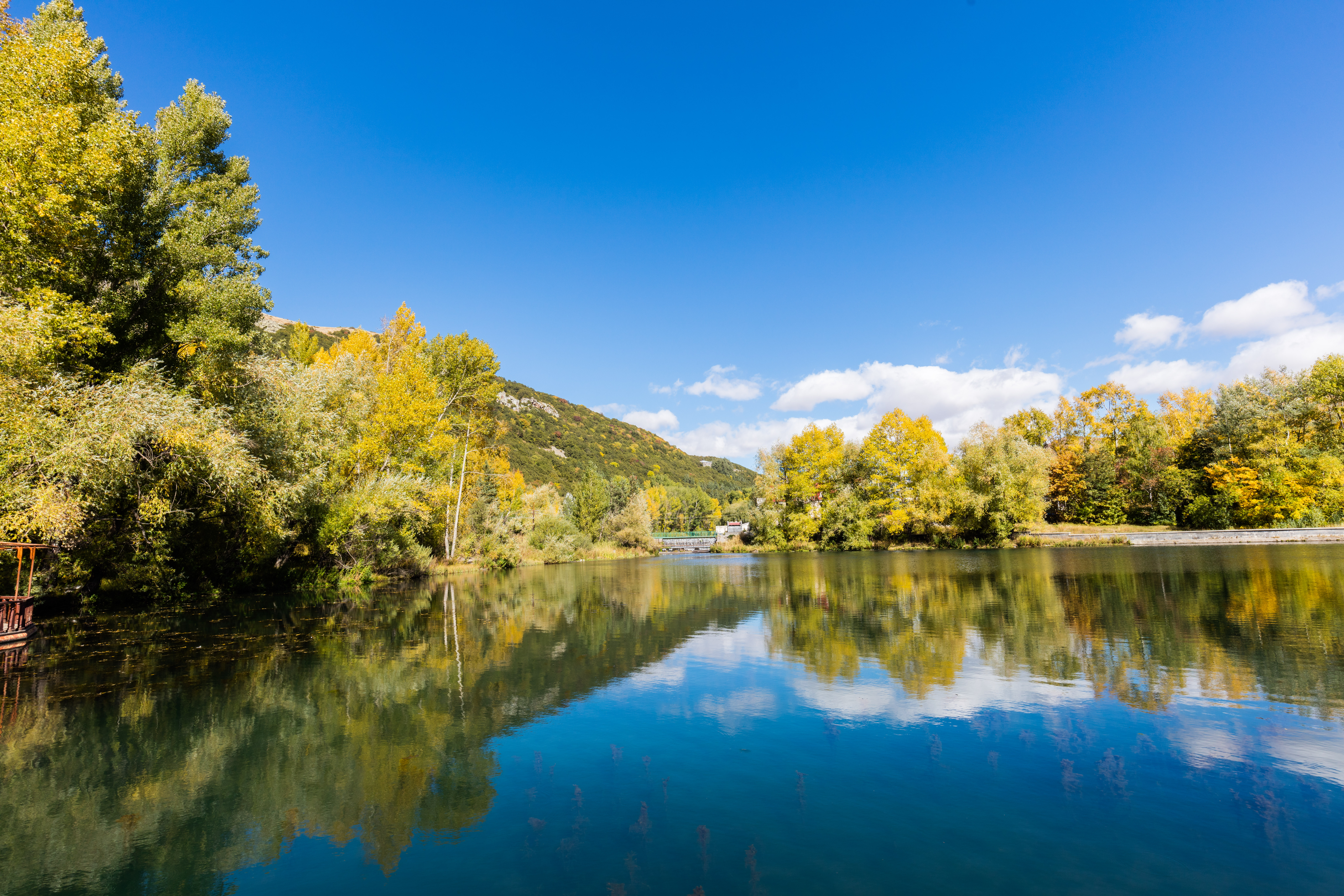
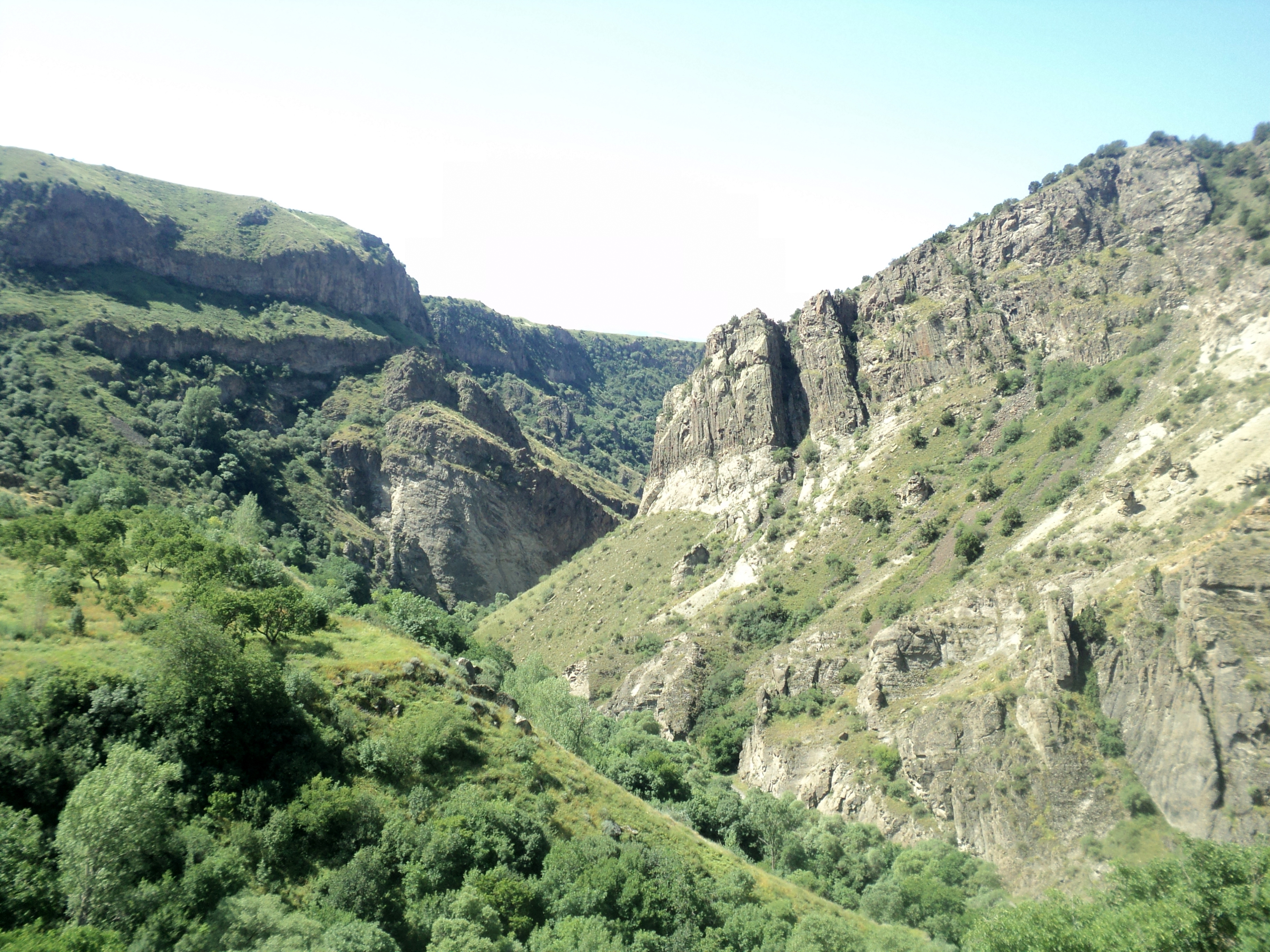
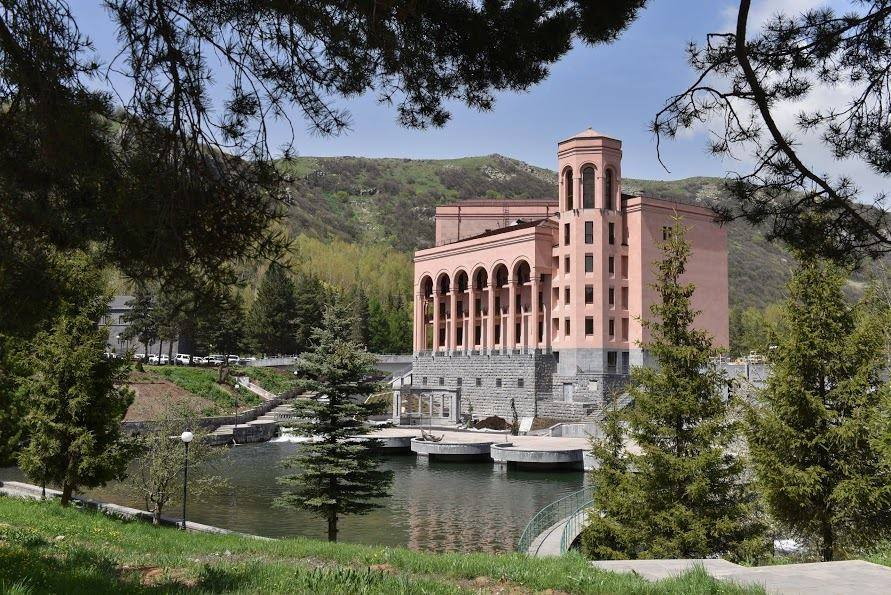
- From the top to bottom-right: Kechut Reservoir, Noravank Monastery, Arpa River, Jermuk Forests, Hyatt Place Resort

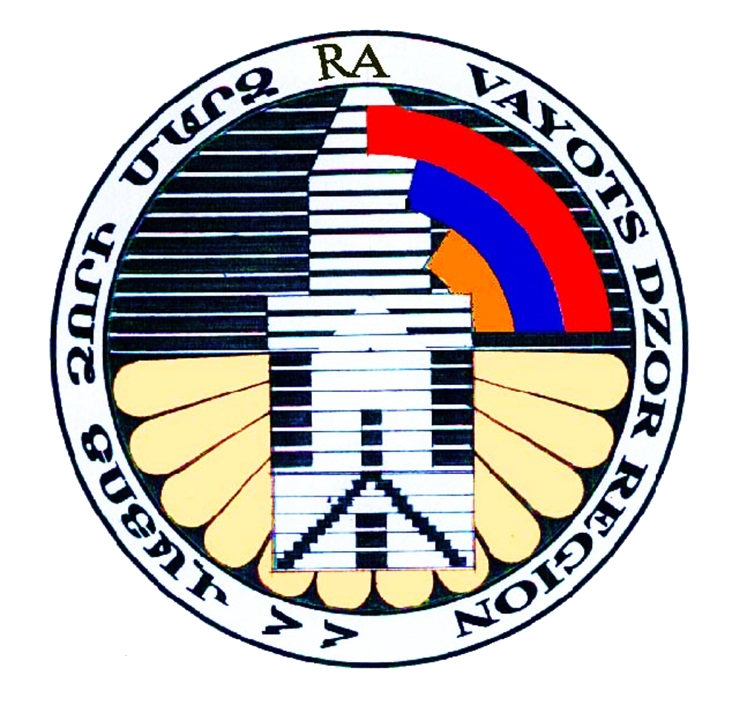
- Coat of arms

- Coordinates: 39°45′N 45°30′E
- Country: Armenia
- Capital and largest city: Yeghegnadzor

Government
  - Governor: Vahagn Arsenyan

Area
  - Total: 2,308 km^{2} (891 sq mi)
  - Rank: 7th

Population (2022)
  - Total: 47,369
  - Rank: 11th
  - Density: 20.52/km^{2} (53.16/sq mi)

GDP
  - Total: ֏ 94.636 billion (US$ 196 million)
  - Per capita: ֏ 1,892,716 (US$ 3,924)
- Time zone: AMT (UTC+04)
- Postal code: 3601–3810
- ISO 3166 code: AM-VD
- FIPS 10-4: AM10
- HDI (2022): 0.782 high · 3rd
- Website: Official website

Vayots Dzor (Armenian: Վայոց Ձոր, Armenian pronunciation: [vɑjˌɔt͡sʰ ˈd͡zɔɾ]) is a province (marz) of Armenia. It lies at the southeastern end of the country, bordering the Nakhchivan exclave of Azerbaijan to the west and the Kalbajar District of Azerbaijan to the east. It covers an area of 2,308 km^{2} (891 sq mi). Known for its mountainous terrain, Vayots Dzor is Armenia's most sparsely populated province, with a population of 47,369 in the 2022 census, down from 52,324 at the 2011 census. The capital and largest city of the province is the town of Yeghegnadzor.

A major wine-producing region in Armenia, Vayots Dzor is home to many ancient landmarks and historical attractions. Among them are the Areni-1 cave complex and Areni-1 winery of the Chalcolithic period, the 8th-century Tanahat Monastery, the 10th-century fortress of Smbataberd, and the 13th-century monastery of Noravank. The province is also home to the spa-town of Jermuk and the village of Gladzor, known for the 13th and 14th-century University of Gladzor.

== Etymology ==
The province is named after the Vayots Dzor canton of historic Syunik, the ninth province of Ancient Armenia. The exact etymology of the name Vayots Dzor is unknown, although it is popularly understood to mean valley or canyon of sorrows (vay is an exclamation of sorrow or pain in Armenian, a cognate of the word "woe"). According to folk tradition, the region received this name after a powerful earthquake struck the area. Historian Grigor Ghapantsyan considers it more likely that the name Vayots Dzor derives from the name of an ancient tribe or ethnic group with the name Vay, perhaps connected with Biaini, the endonym of the ancient kingdom of Urartu.

== Geography ==
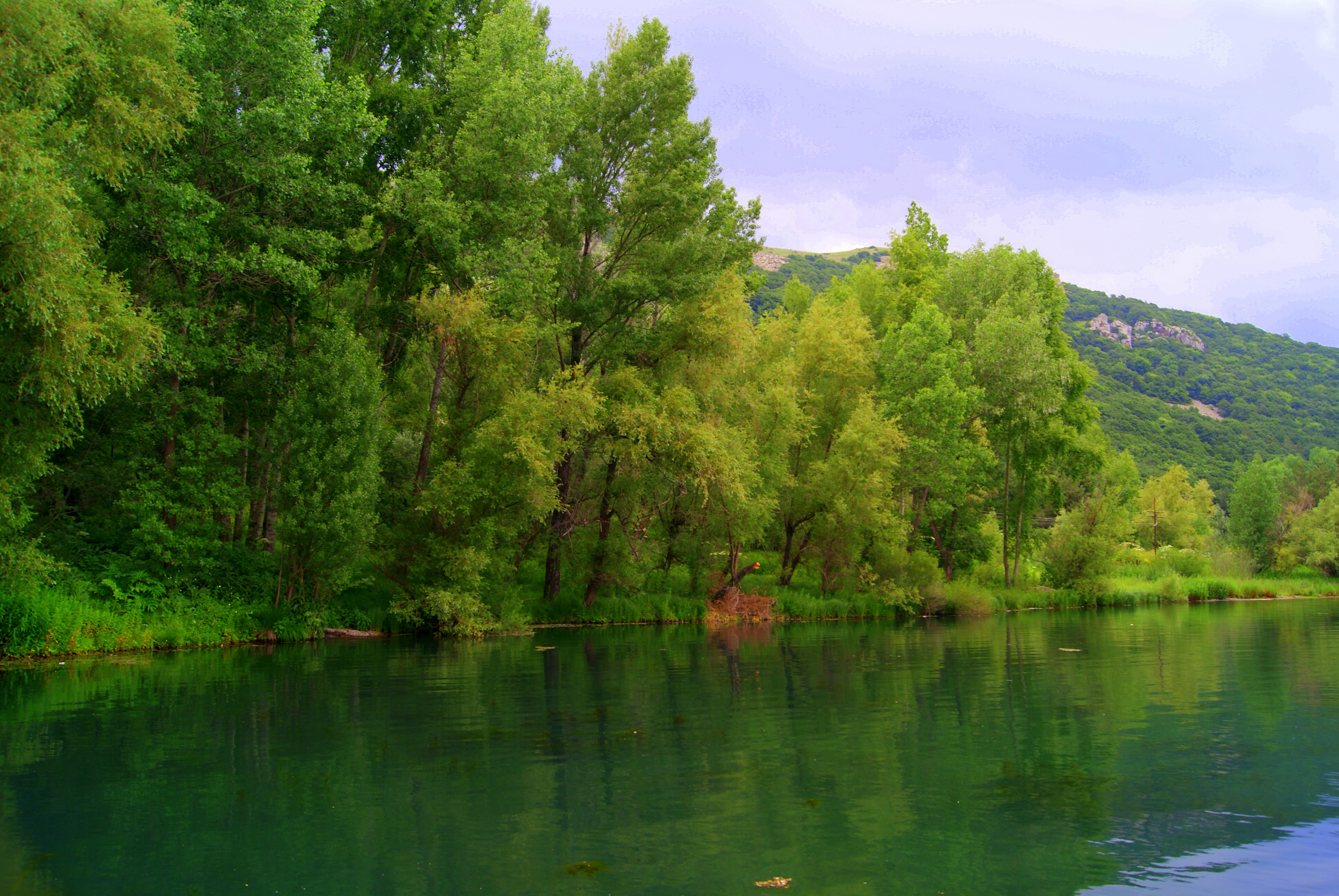
View from the Jermuk Hydrological Sanctuary

Situated at the southeastern end of modern-day Armenia, Vayots Dzor covers an area of 2,308 km^{2} (7.8% of total area of Armenia). It the most sparsely populated province in the country. It borders the Nakhchivan exclave of Azerbaijan from the west and the Kalbajar District of Azerbaijan from the east (administered as the Shahumyan Region of the Nagorno-Karabakh Republic between 1993 and 2020). Domestically, it is bordered by the Gegharkunik Province from the north, Ararat Province from the northwest and Syunik Province from the southeast.

Historically, the current territory of the province occupies most of the Vayots Dzor canton of the historic Syunik province of Ancient Armenia.

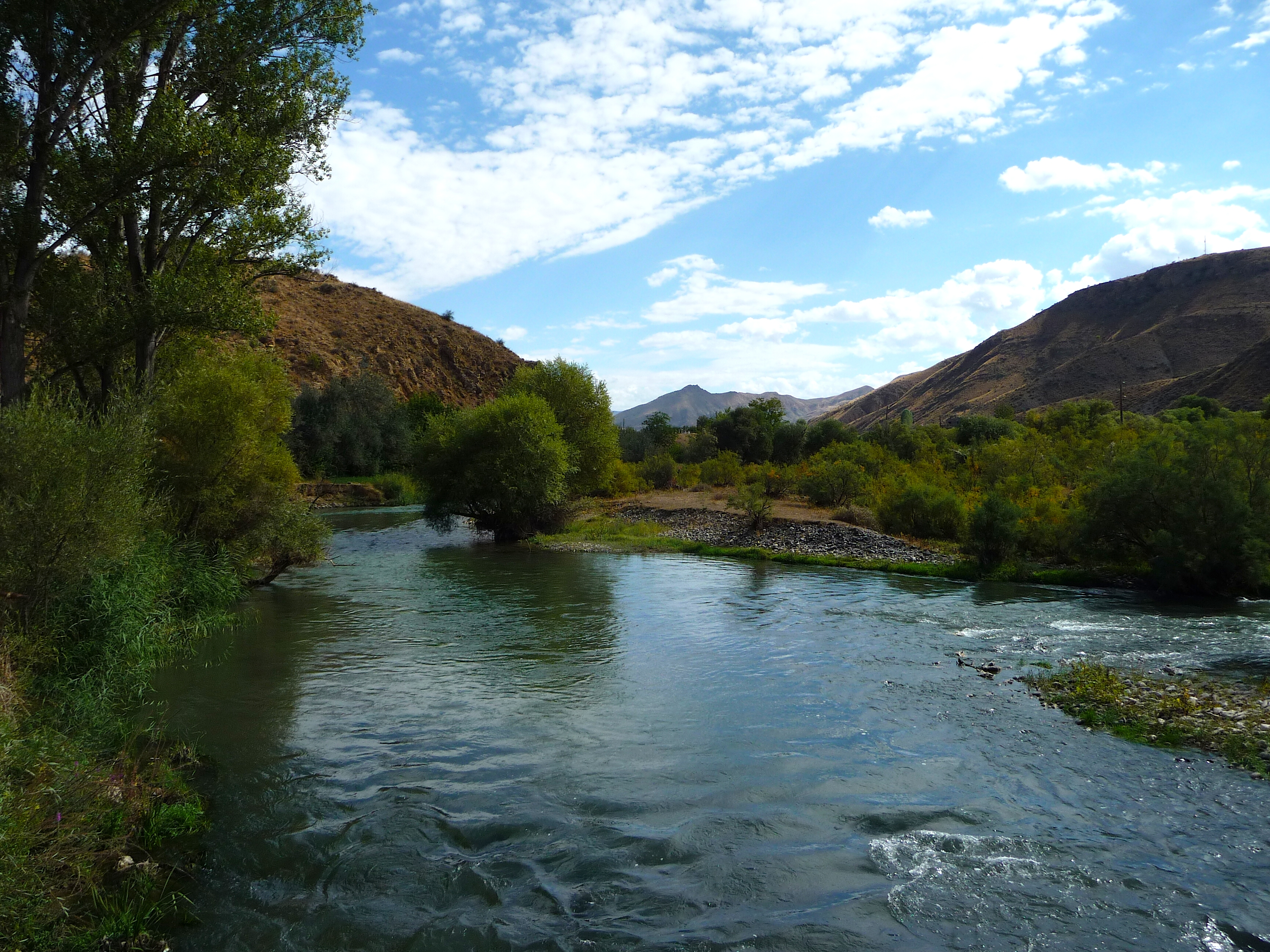
Arpa river

Vayots Dzor is a mountainous region. It is mainly divided into 3 mountain ranges: the Vardenis mountain range at the north, the Arpa range in the middle and the Vayk range at the south. At a height of 3522 meters, Mount Vardenis in the north is the highest point in the province, while the Areni valley, at a height of 850 meters, is the lowest point. The 2586 meters-high Vayots Sar volcanic cone is located almost at the centre of the province.

Vayots Dzor has many rivers, mountains springs and mineral water, with the Arpa River being the most significant of them. It flows 92 km in the territory of Vayots Dzor, through the settlements of Jermuk, Vayk, Yeghegnadzor, and Areni, among others. It originates in Vayots Dzor from the northwest part of the Syunik plateau at a height of 3260 meters, and flows into the Araks river. It has a number of tributaries that form waterfalls such as the Jermuk and the Herher.

Yeghegis river is the main tributary of Arpa. It flows into a valley that is protected by the government as a wildlife sanctuary.

Most of the rivers in Vayots Dzor are characterized by swift flow, deep fall and inclination. A large project was completed during the Soviet period to transfer the water of Arpa river to Lake Sevan. Thus, an underground water tunnel was opened in 1981 that starts from the basin of the Kechut reservoir to transfer the flow of the Arpa river into Kake Sevan.

A number of small lakes are also found in the valley of the Herher River.

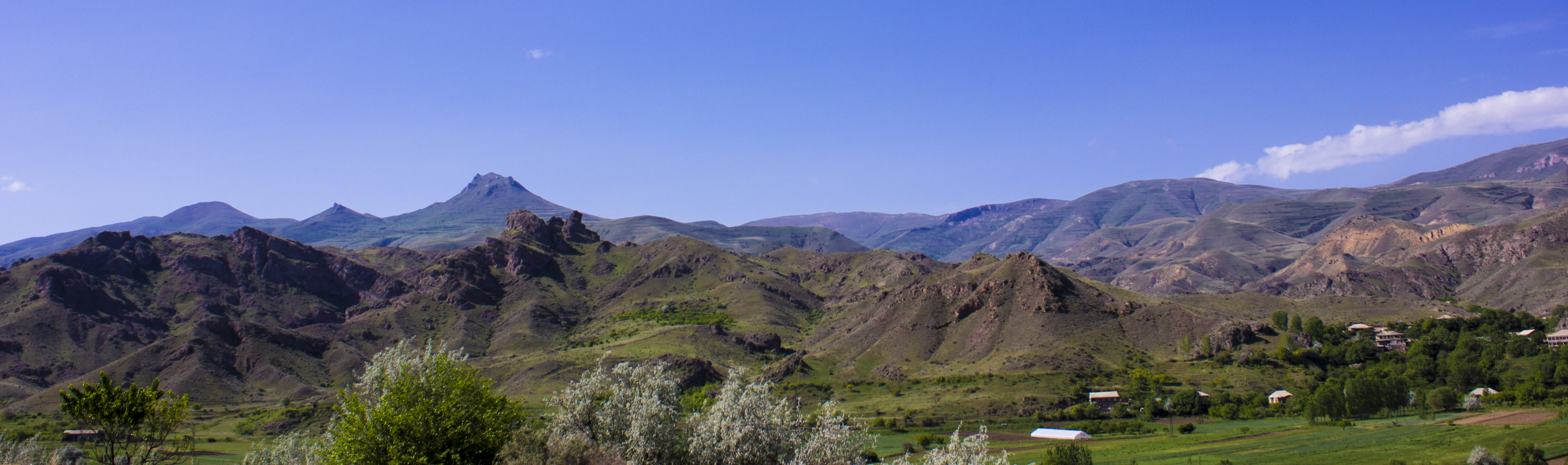
Vayk mountain range

== History ==
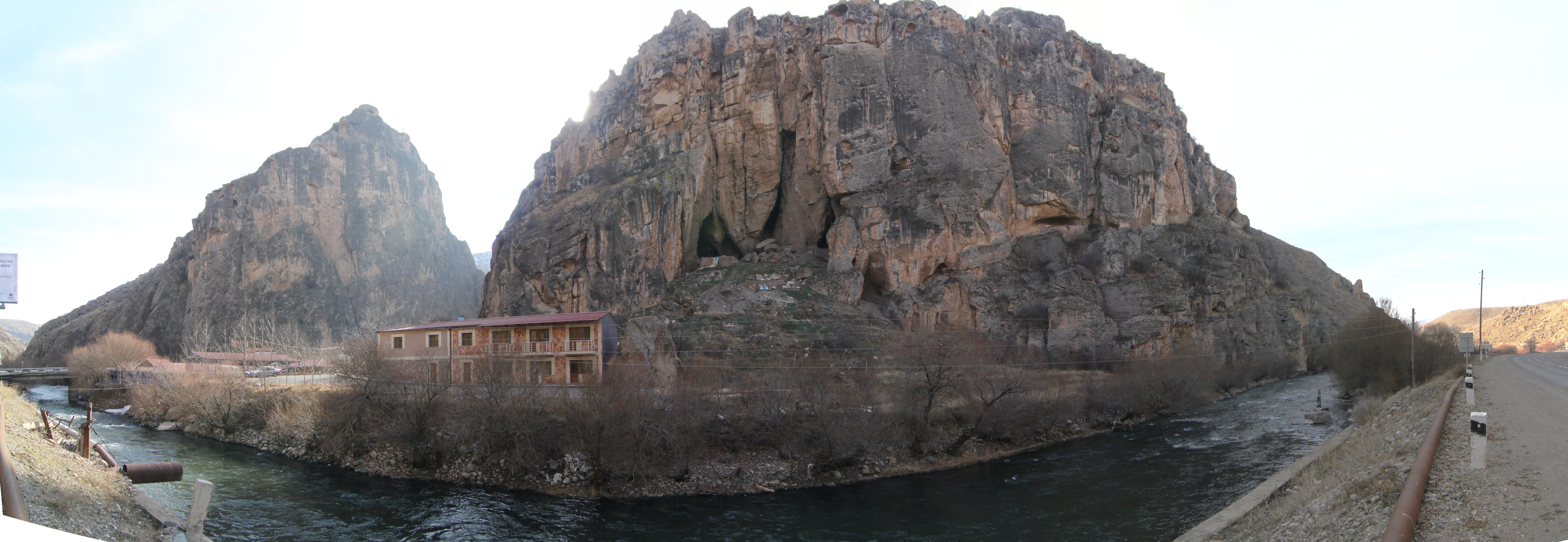
The Areni-1 cave complex

Vayots Dzor is first mentioned in the History of Armenia by Movses Khorenatsi. The region has been inhabited by humans since prehistoric times. Archaeological investigations have uncovered many sites and objects dating back to the Paleolithic Era and the Bronze Age, including carvings on cliffs depicting scenes of hunting and animals. The Areni-1 cave complex—including the 6,100-year-old Areni-1 winery—discovered in archaeological excavations conducted between 2007 and 2011, revealed that the region was settled during the 5th millennium BC (Late Chalcolithic Age). The winery consists of fermentation vats, a wine press, storage jars, pottery sherds, and is believed to be the earliest known winery in history. A 5500-year-old leather shoe, the oldest known piece of leather footwear, has also been found in Areni-1.

As early as the 8th century BC, the area of modern-day Vayots Dzor was part of the Kingdom of Urartu. Later, it became part of the Kingdom of Armenia forming the Vayots Dzor canton of the province of Syunik, under the rule of the Siunia dynasty.

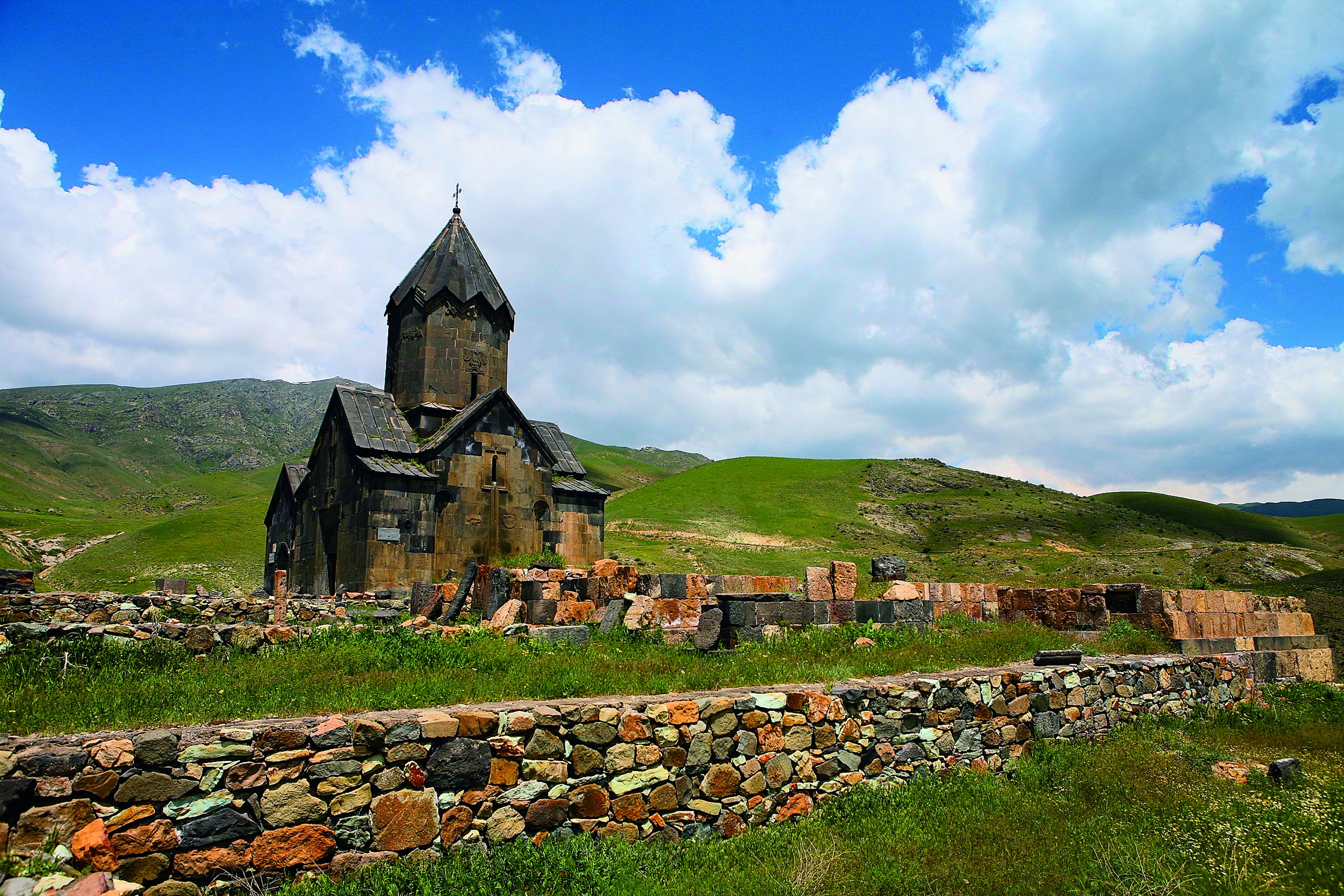
Tanahat Monastery, founded in the 8th century, rebuilt during the 13th century

The Orbelian family became especially prominent in Vayots Dzor and Syunik during the Middle Ages. Many churches, monastic complexes, bridges and caravanserais were built between the 10th and 13th centuries under their influence. Vayots Dzor benefited from its location on the Silk Road, particularly along the road that now links the town of Martuni with Yeghegnadzor. During this period, the province became home to the University of Gladzor. Founded around 1280 by Nerses of Mush, it was one of the earliest higher educational centres of medieval Armenia.

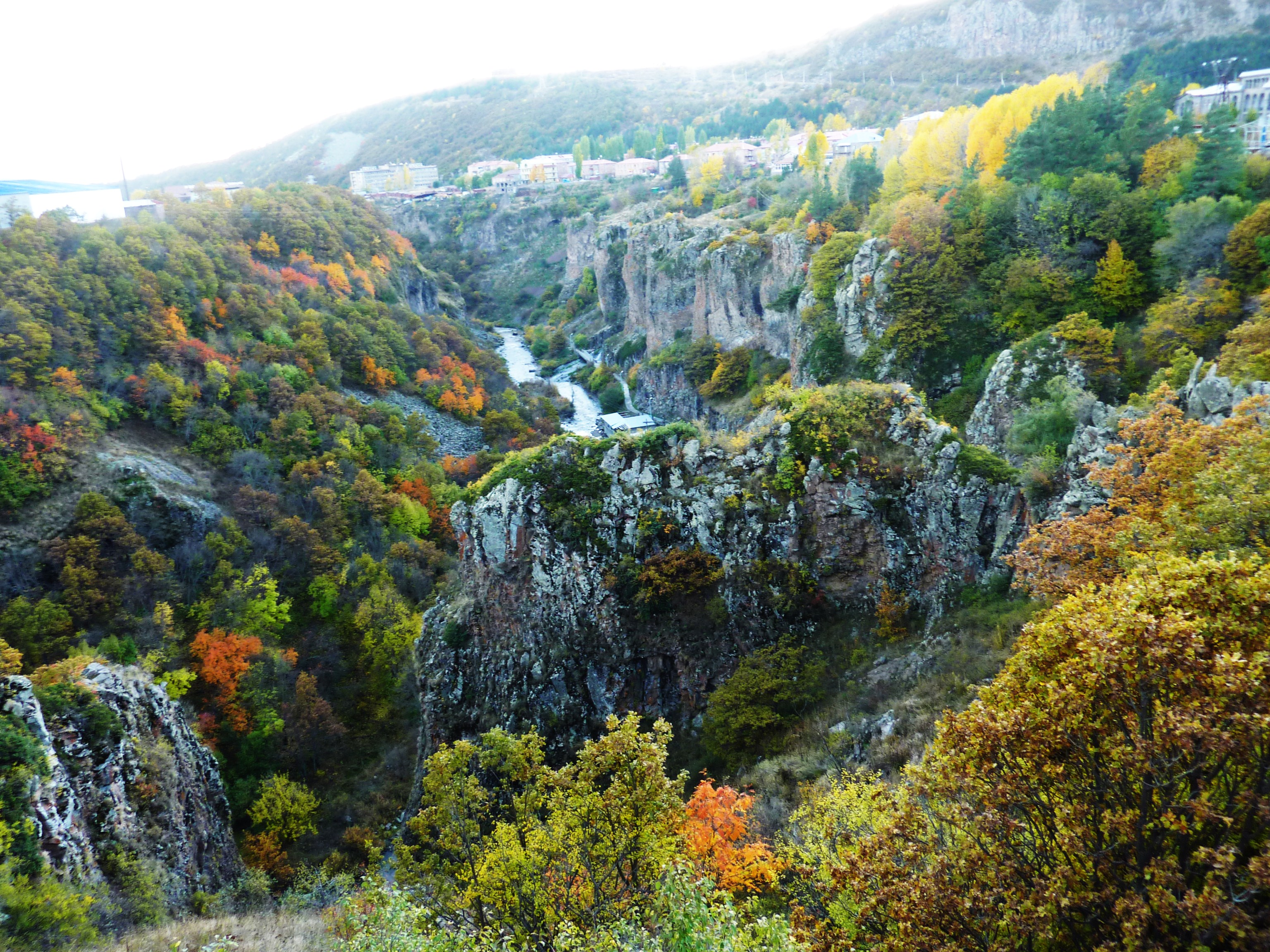
Jermuk canyon and forest

The period between the 15th and 17th centuries is considered by historians to be one of the darkest in the history of Vayots Dzor. The region became a frequent battlefield between the invading troops of the Turkic and Iranian tribes. As a result, many monuments and villages were destroyed and the population was displaced. It later became part of the Nakhichevan Khanate under Persian suzerainty and became known as Daralagyaz (also spelled Daralagez or Daralayaz).

During the first half of the 19th century, following the Russo-Persian War of 1826-28 and the resulting Treaty of Turkmenchay signed in 1828, Vayots Dzor passed from Iranian to Russian rule. In the same year that the territory came under Russian rule, it was incorporated into the newly established Armenian Oblast. In 1849, the Erivan Governorate was founded including Vayots Dzor, while in 1870, the governorate was further divided into uezds. Consequently, Vayots Dzor became part of the Sharur-Daralayaz uezd of the Erivan Governorate.

Between 1918 and 1920, the region was included within the short-lived Republic of Armenia. After the Sovietization of Armenia, Vayots Dzor became one of the regions that resisted Soviet rule and formed part of the unrecognized Republic of Mountainous Armenia under the leadership of Garegin Nzhdeh. However, after falling to the Bolsheviks in July 1921, Vayots Dzor became part of the Armenian Soviet Socialist Republic.

During the Soviet period, modern-day Vayots Dzor was divided into the raions of Yeghegnadzor and Azizbekov. After the independence of Armenia, the two raions were merged during the 1995 administrative reform to form the Vayots Dzor Province.

== Demographics ==
=== Population ===
According to the 1989 Soviet census, the Vayots Dzor Province (then part of the Vayk and Yeghegnadzor districts in 1930–1995) had a population of 60,357. 10,234 or 16.96% of which was urban, distributed in the city of Jermuk, and 50,123 or 83.04% were rural, distributed in the districts of Vayk (13,680) and Yeghegnadzor (36,443).

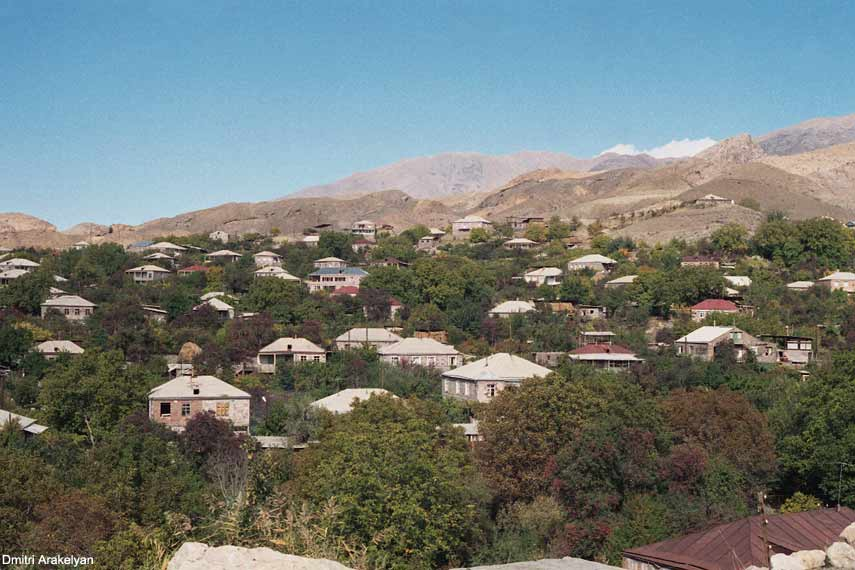
Malishka village

The population and density in Vayots Dzor is the least among the provinces of Armenia. According to the 2011 official census, Vayots Dzor has a population of 52,324 (25,740 men and 26,584 women), forming around 1.7% of the entire population of Armenia. The urban population is 18,449 (35.26%) and the rural is 33,875 (64.74%). The province has 3 urban and 41 rural communities. The largest urban community is the provincial centre of Yeghegnadzor, with a population of 7,944. The other urban centres of Vayk and Jermuk have a population of 5,877 and 4,628 respectively.

With a population of 4,460, the village of Malishka is the largest rural municipality of Vayots Dzor.

=== Ethnic groups and religion ===
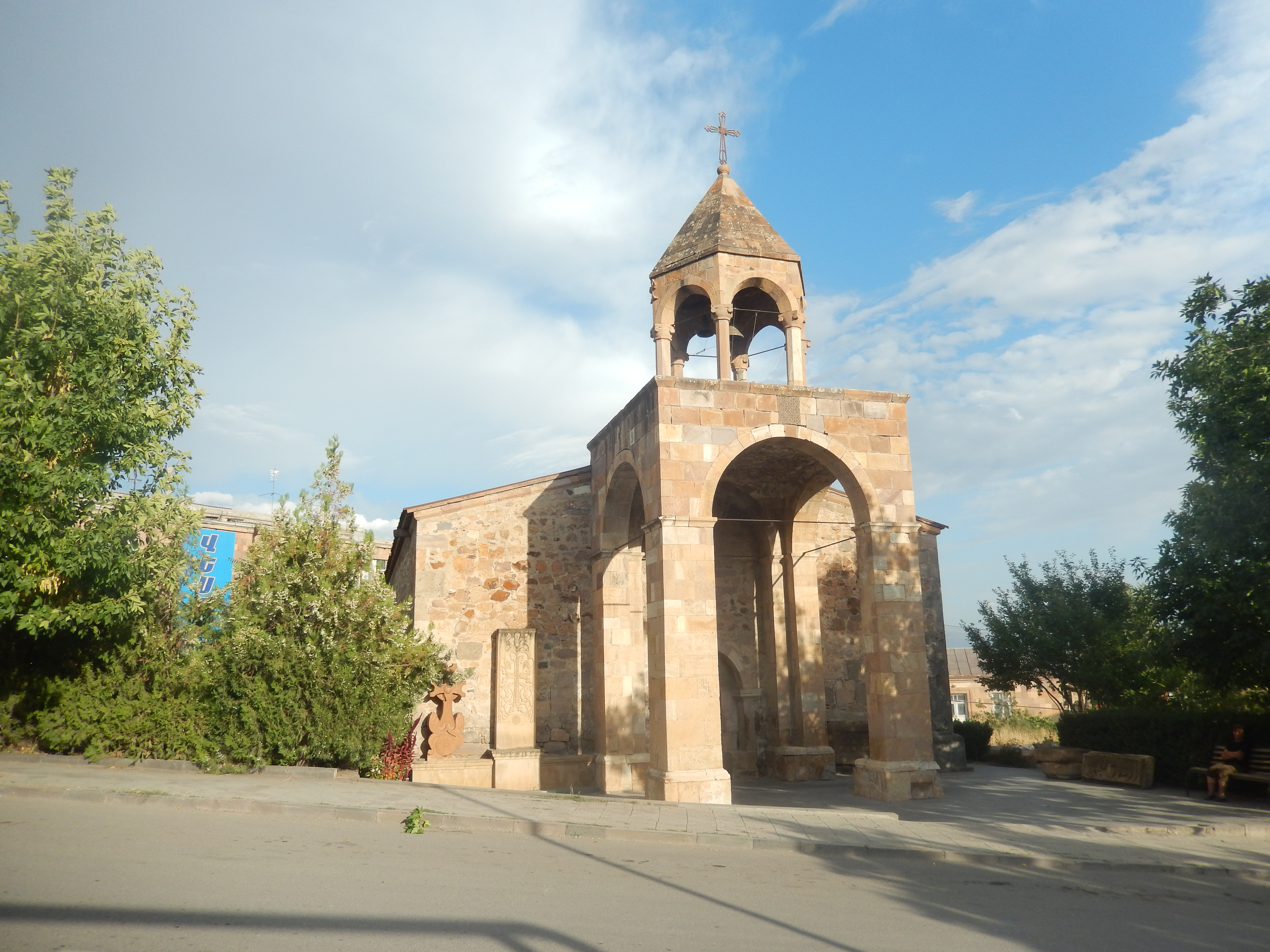
Cathedral of the Holy Mother of God in Yeghegnadzor, 12th century

The majority of the Vayots Dzor Province population are ethnic Armenians who belong to the Armenian Apostolic Church. The regulating body of the church is the Diocese of Vayots Dzor, headed by Archbishop Abraham Mkrtchyan. The Holy Mother of God Cathedral (known also as Surp Sarkis) in Yeghegnadzor is the seat of the diocese.

A percentage of the population in Vayots Dzor have their ancestors migrated from the Iranian towns of Salmas and Khoy in 1829 and 1830.

== Administrative divisions ==
As a result of the administrative reforms concluded by June 17, 2016, October 8, 2016, and June 9, 2017, Vayots Dzor is currently divided into 8 municipal communities (hamaynkner)

- A cross denotes a town (urban settlement), otherwise, the settlements are villages (rural settlements).

Municipality	Area (km^{2})	Population (2022 census)	Centre	Settlements
Areni Community	438	9,515	Areni	Agarakadzor, Aghavnadzor, Arpi, Chiva, Gnishik, Khachik, Mozrov, Rind, Yelpin. (Abandoned: Amaghu)
Jermuk Community	497	5,694	Jermuk†	Gndevaz, Herher, Karmrashen
Vayk Community	184	10,475	Vayk†	Arin, Azatek, Por, Zedea
Yeghegis Community	477	5,381	Shatin	Aghnjadzor, Artabuynk, Goghtanik, Hermon, Horbategh, Hors, Karaglukh, Salli, Sevazhayr, Taratumb, Vardahovit, Yeghegis. (Abandoned: Arates, Getikvank, Kalasar)
Yeghegnadzor Community	27	16,304	Yeghegnadzor†	

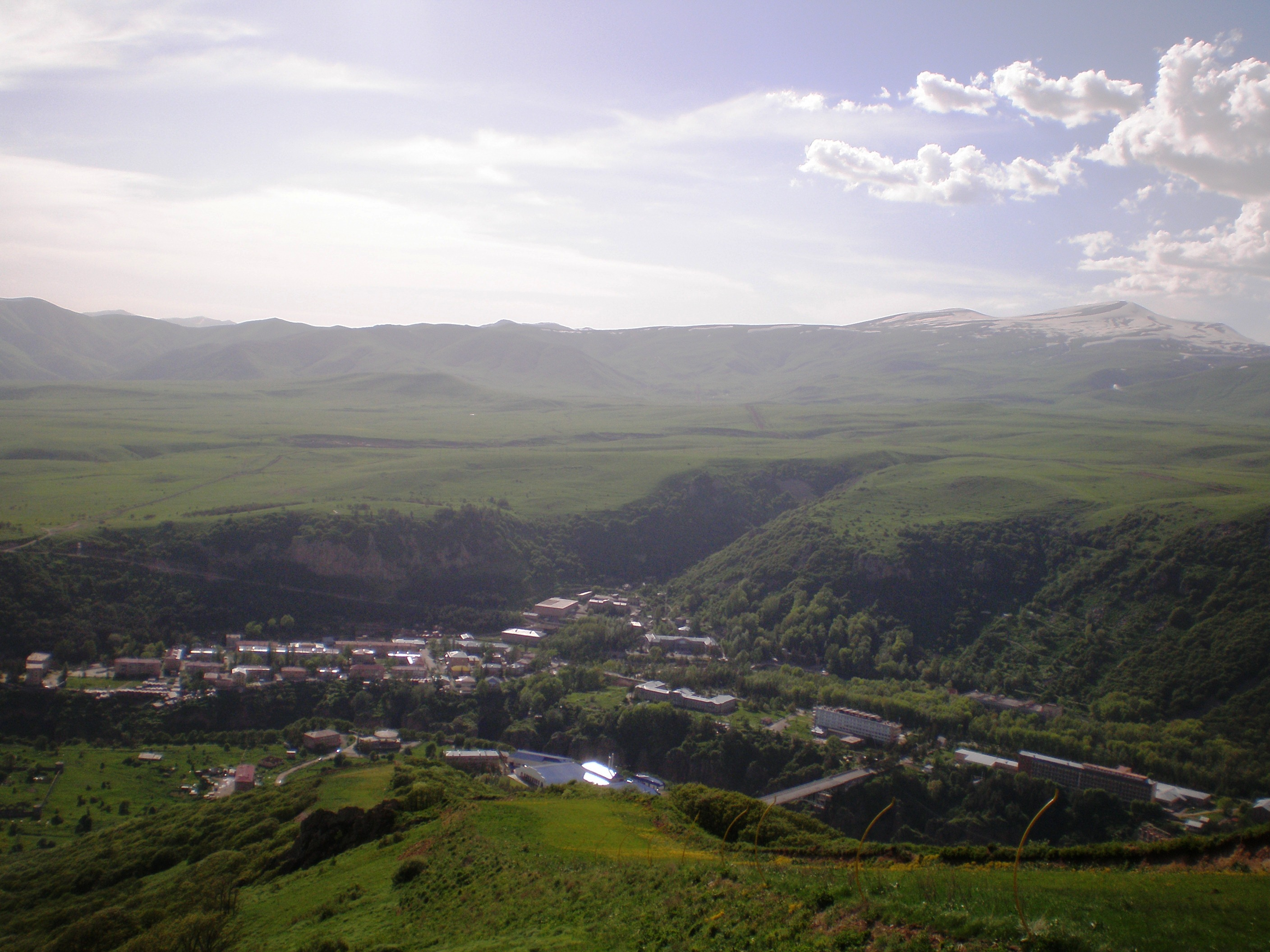
Jermuk

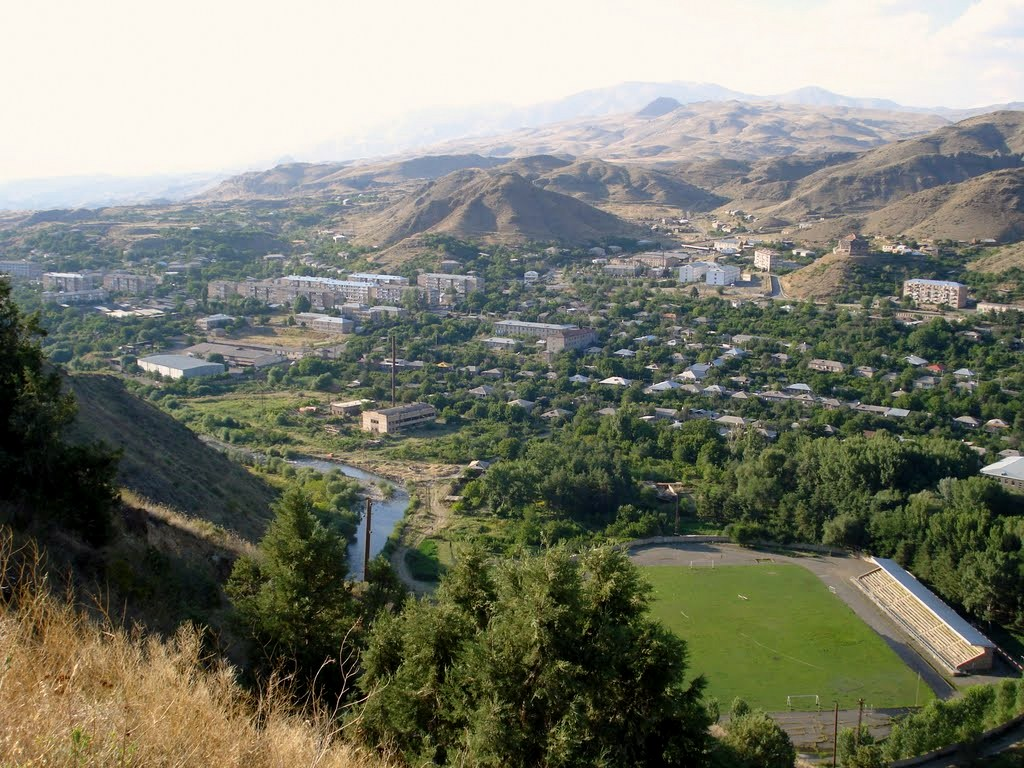
Vayk

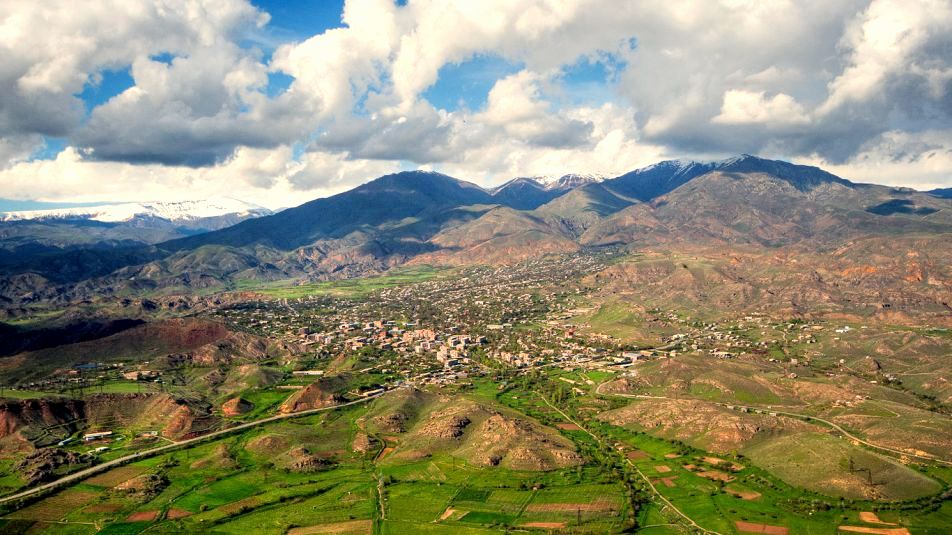
Yeghegnadzor

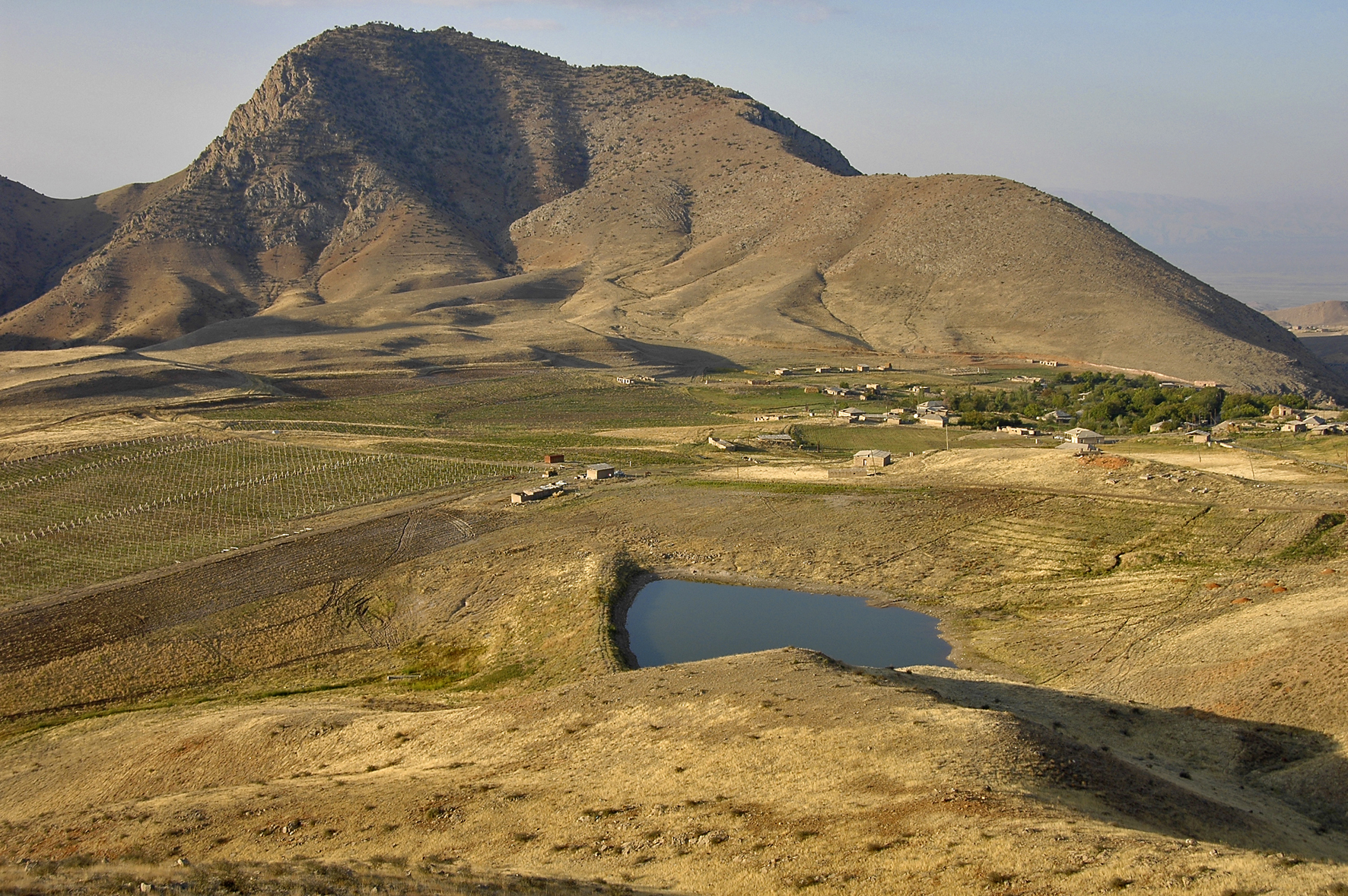
Areni

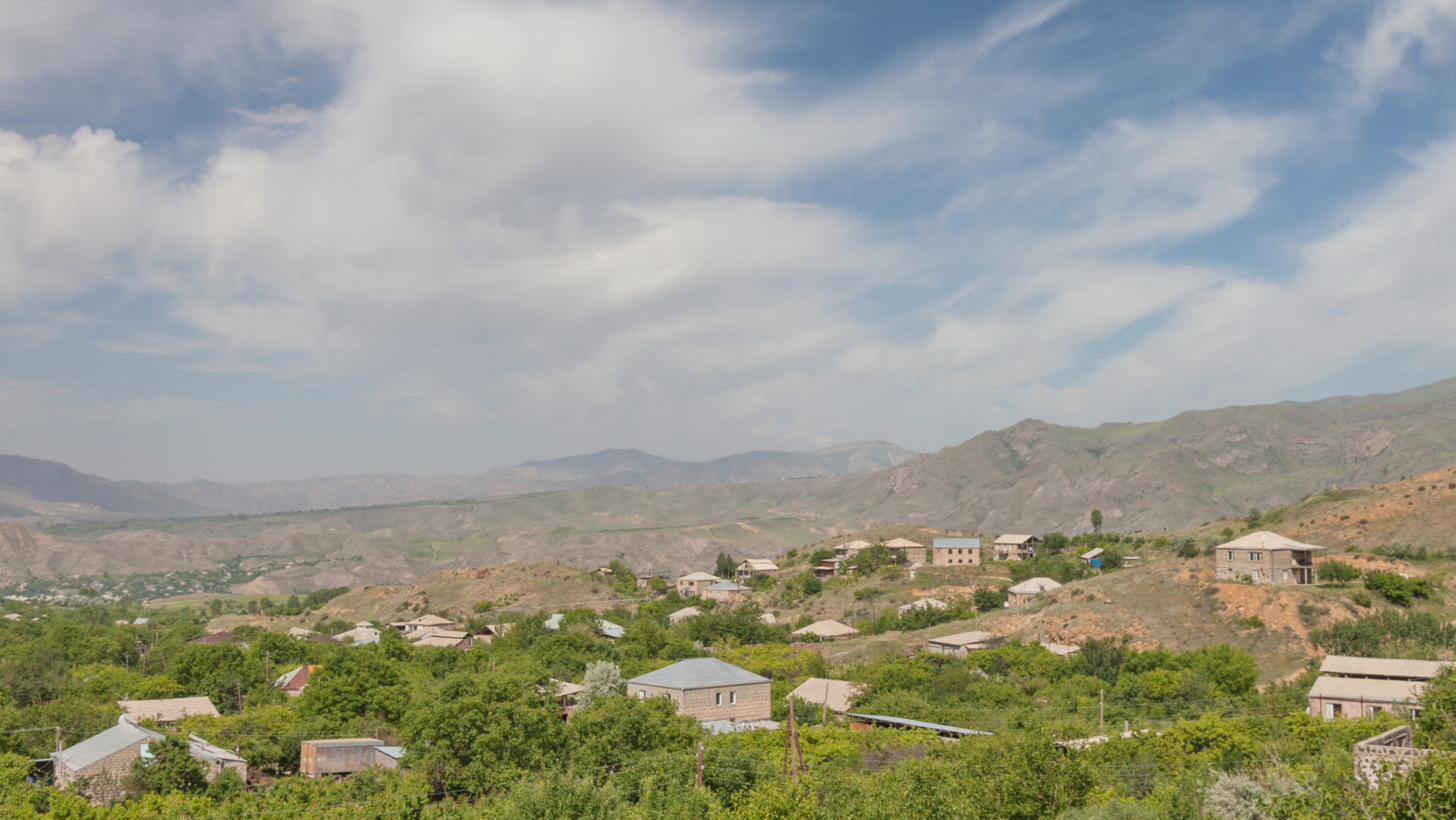
Gladzor

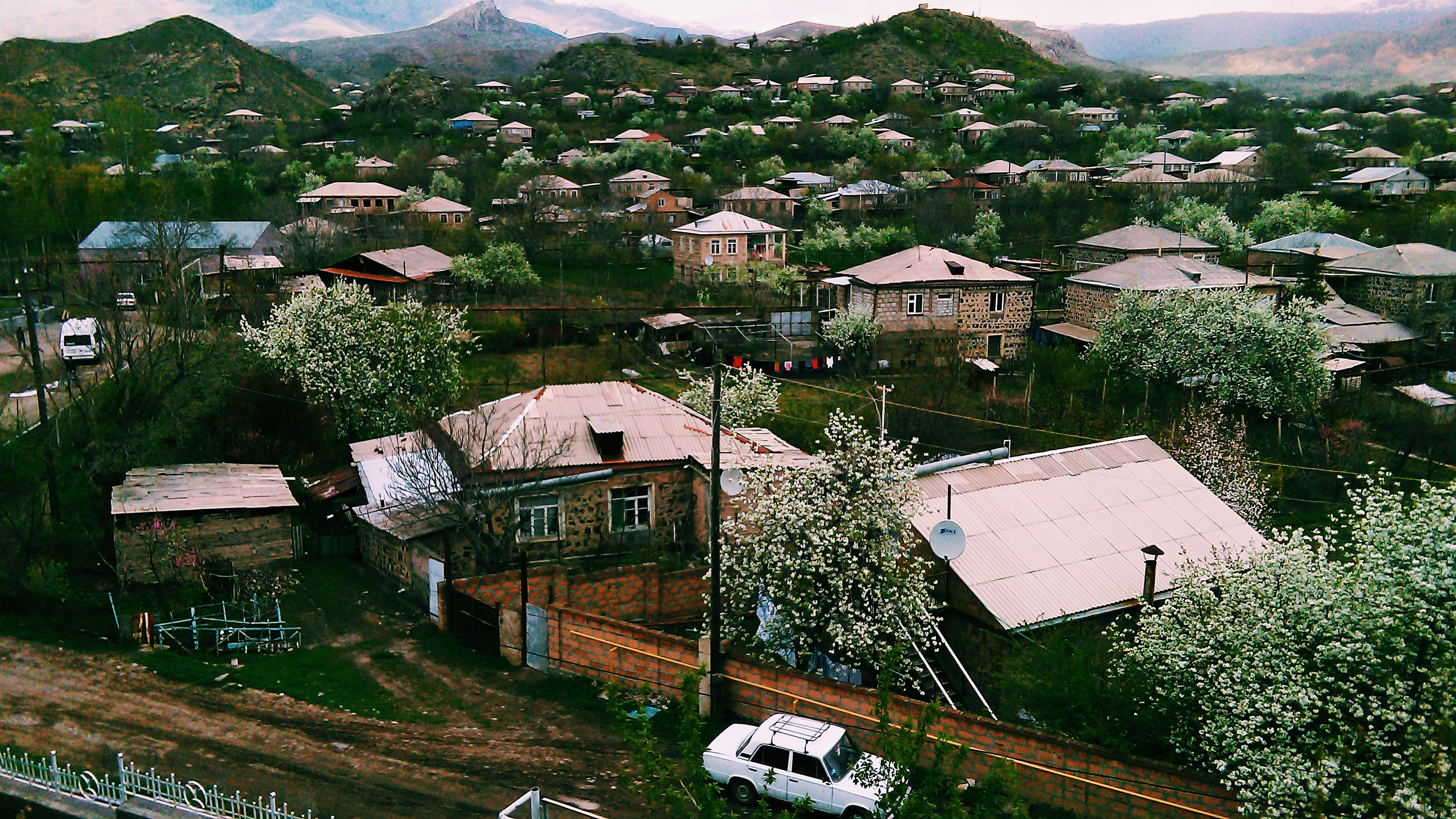
Malishka

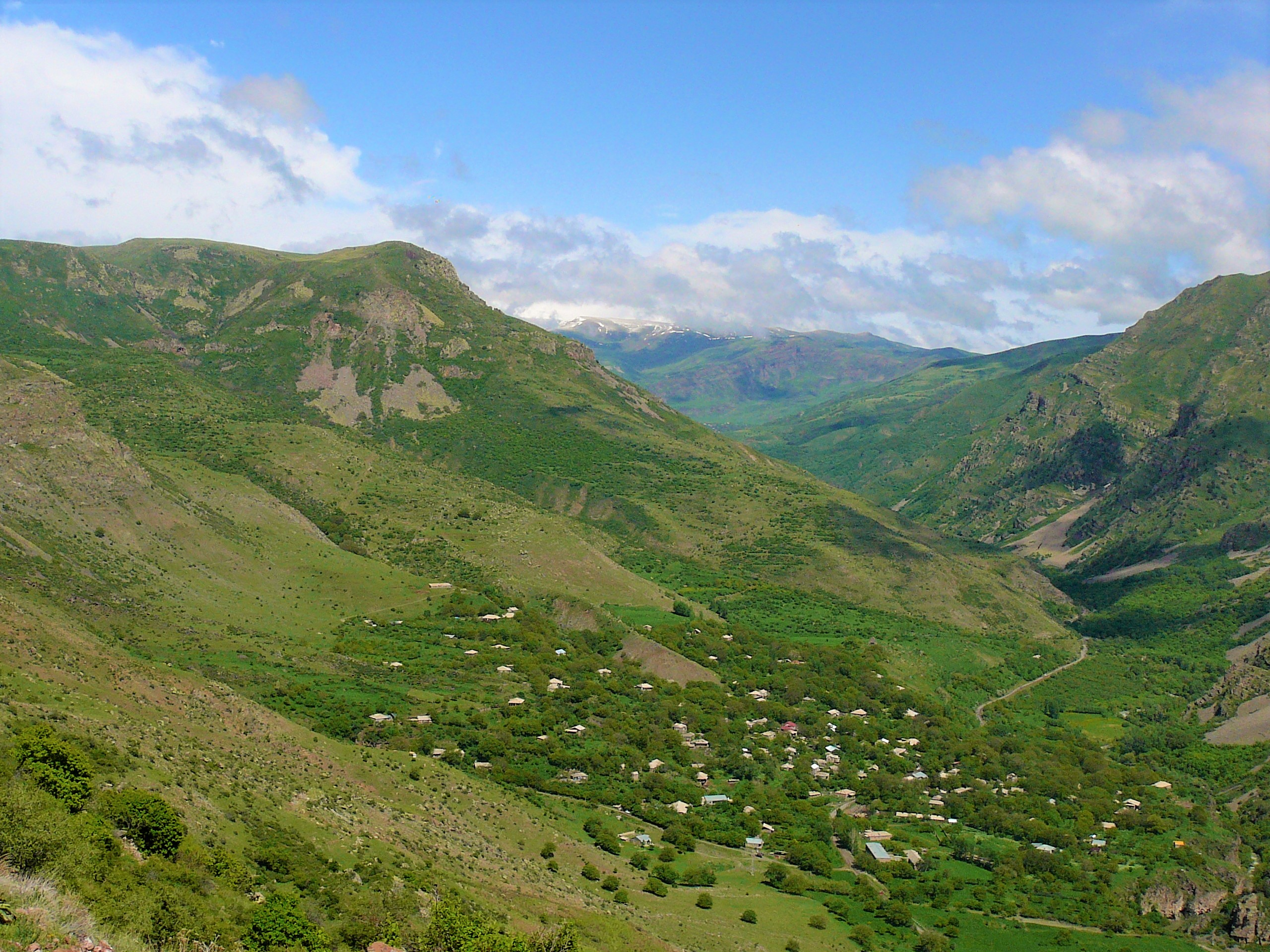
Yeghegis

== Culture ==
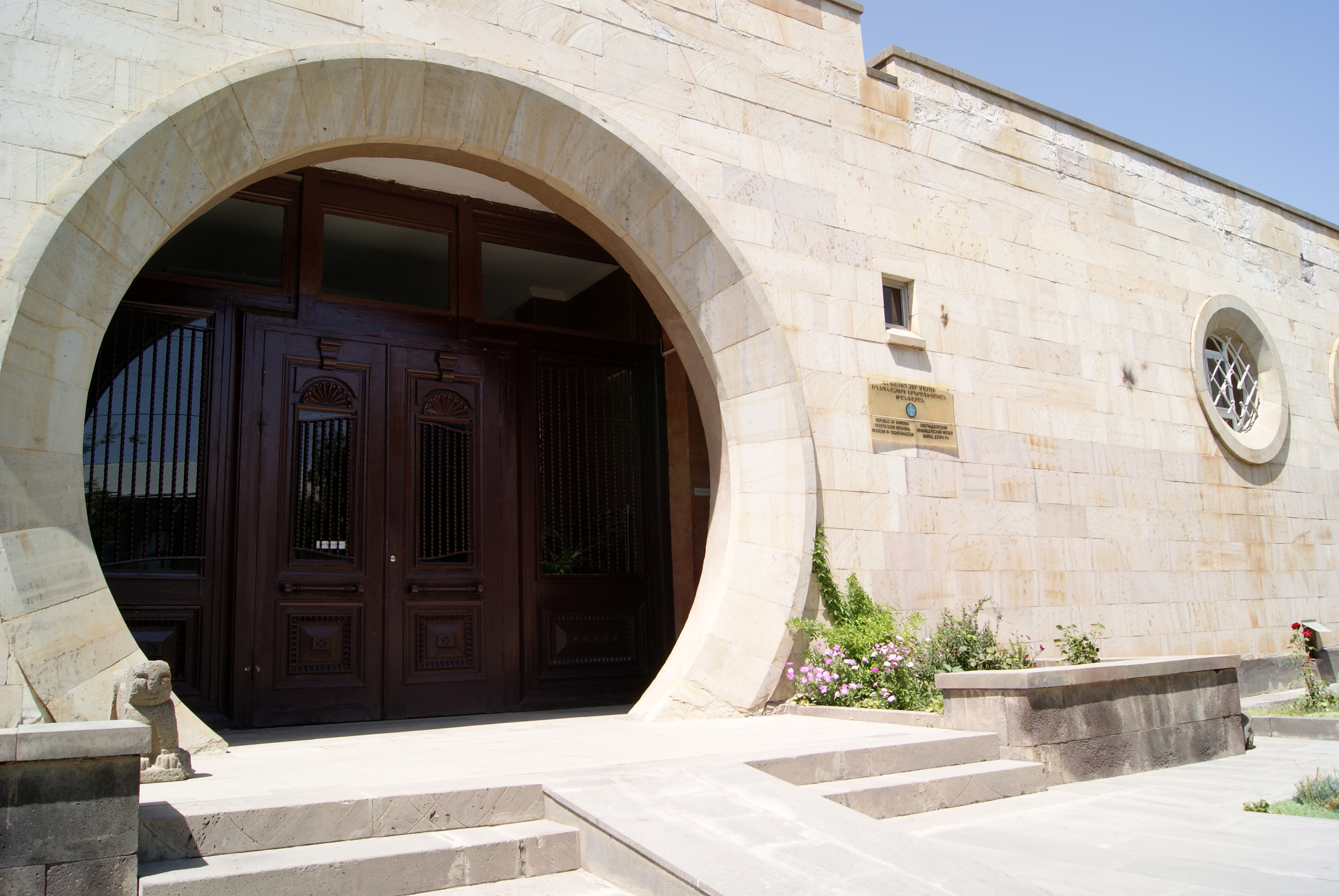
The archaeological museum in Yeghegnadzor

Yeghegnadzor has a cultural palace, a public library and an archaeological museum. The town's public park has a vishapakar (dragon stone) dating back to the 2nd millennium BC.

=== Fortresses and archaeological sites ===
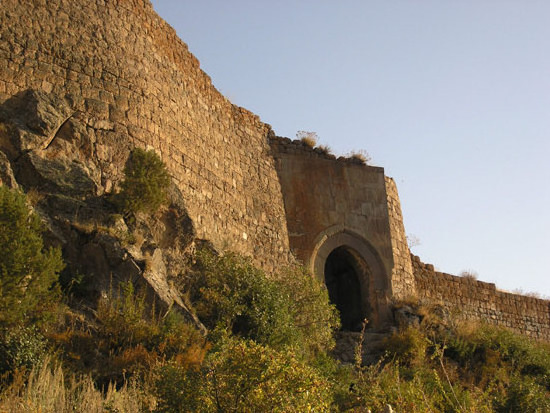
Smbataberd fortress of the 10th century

- Areni-1 cave complex and the Winery of the Chalcolithic age
- Smbataberd fortress of the 10th century
- Proshaberd fortress of the 13th century
- Ertij Fort of the 13th century
- Agarakadzor bridge of the 13th century
- Orbelian's Caravanserai of 1332
- Hostun, settlement with ruined church

=== Churches and monasteries ===
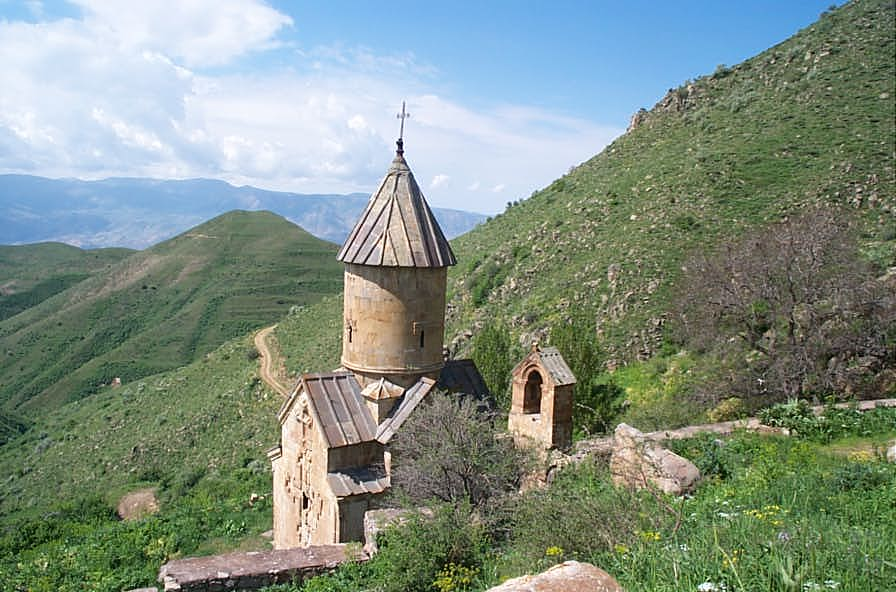
Spitakavor Monastery of 1321

- Tanahat Monastery of 735
- Saint Sion Monastery of the 8th century
- Shativank monastery of the 10th century
- Khotakerats Monastery of the 10th century
- Tsakhats Kar Monastery, 10th-11th centuries
- Noravank monastery, 10th-13th centuries
- Gndevank monastery, 10th-13th centuries
- Cathedral of the Holy Mother of God in Yeghegnadzor, 12th century
- Noravank monastery of 1205
- Spitakavor Monastery of 1321
- Areni Church of 1321

=== Media ===
Vardadzor monthly is the regional newspaper of Vayots Dzor. It has been published in Yeghegnadzor since 15 November 2002. It covers political, economical and regional news. It also has a literary supplement.

== Transportation ==
The M-2 Motorway that connects Armenia from north to south, passes through the province. On the other hand, the towns of Yeghegnadzor are domestically connected through a number of well-developed roads.

The Jermuk airstrip is located near Jermuk, adjacent to the Kechut Reservoir.

== Economy ==
=== Agriculture and viticulture ===
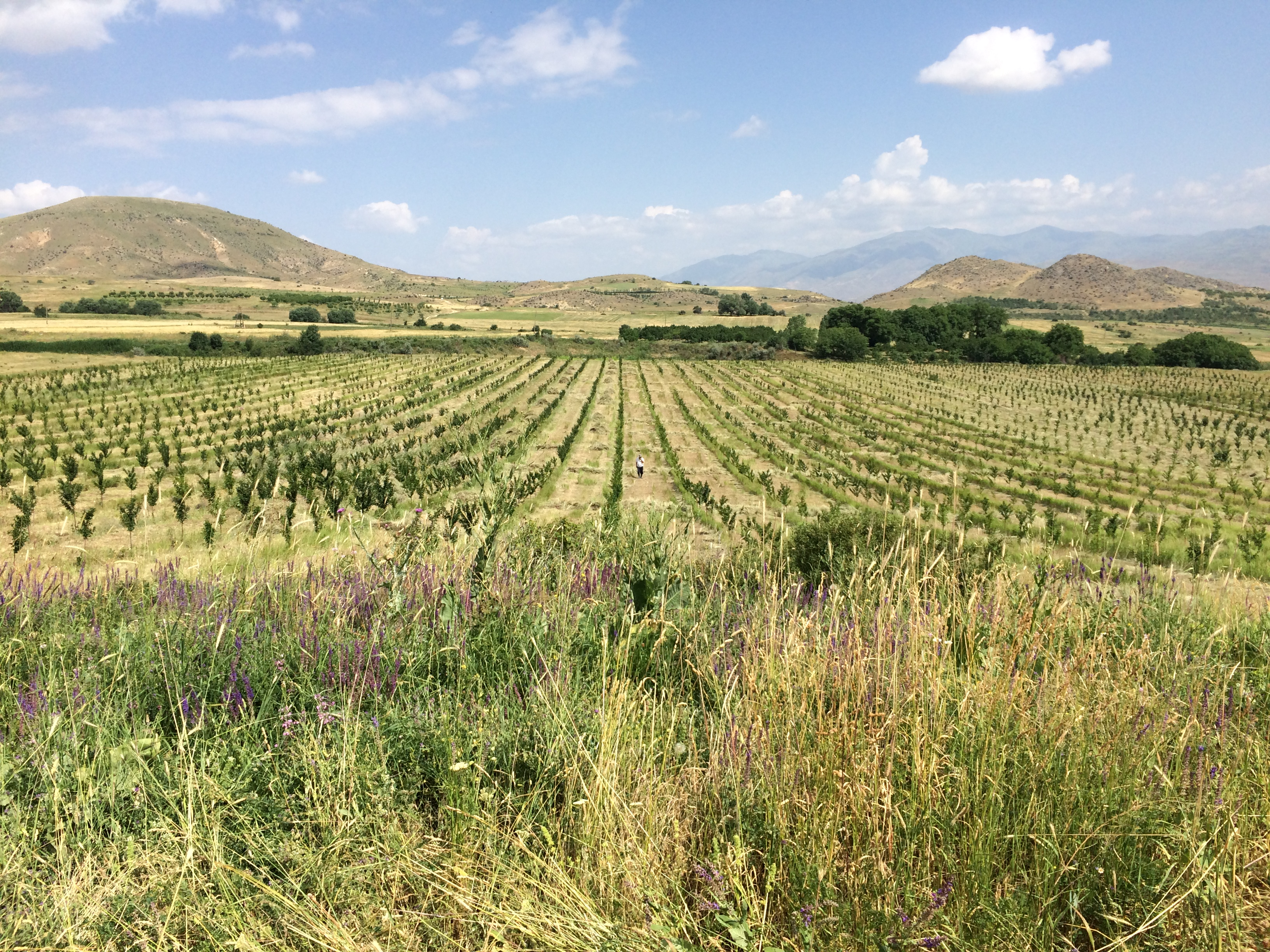
Orchards in Vayots Dzor

Vayots Dzor has the poorest agricultural index among the Armenian provinces, forming 2.2% of the annual total agricultural product of Armenia. Around 82.5% (1,903 km^{2}) of the total area of the total area of the province arable lands, out of which only 8.5% (162 km^{2}) are ploughed.

=== Industry ===
The industry of Vayots Dzor contributes 1% of the annual total industrial product of Armenia. Industry is mainly based on water bottling, alcoholic drinks production (mainly wine), food-processing and dairy products. The discovery of the 6100 year-old Areni-1 winery has provided increased awareness of the ancient tradition of wine-making in Armenia and particularly in the region of ancient Syunik.

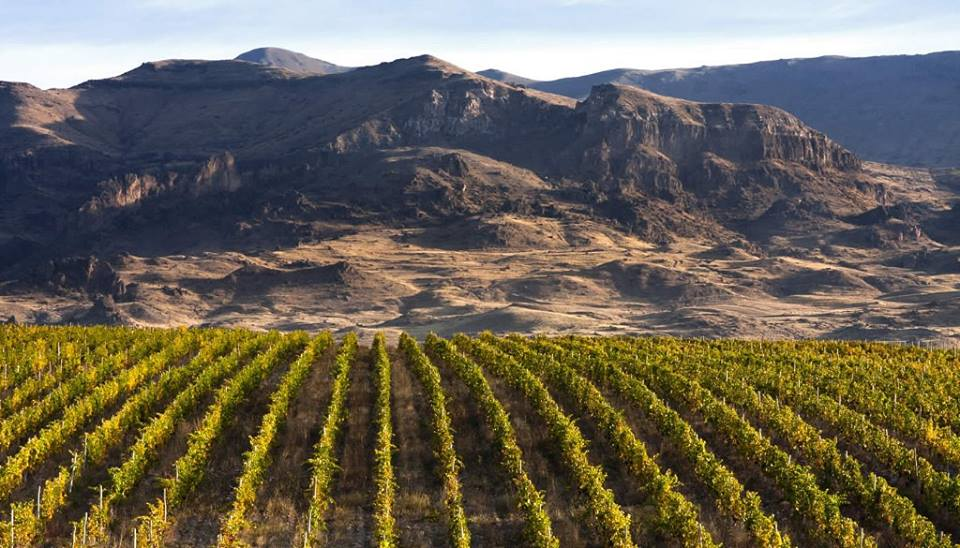
Zorah Wines Vineyards

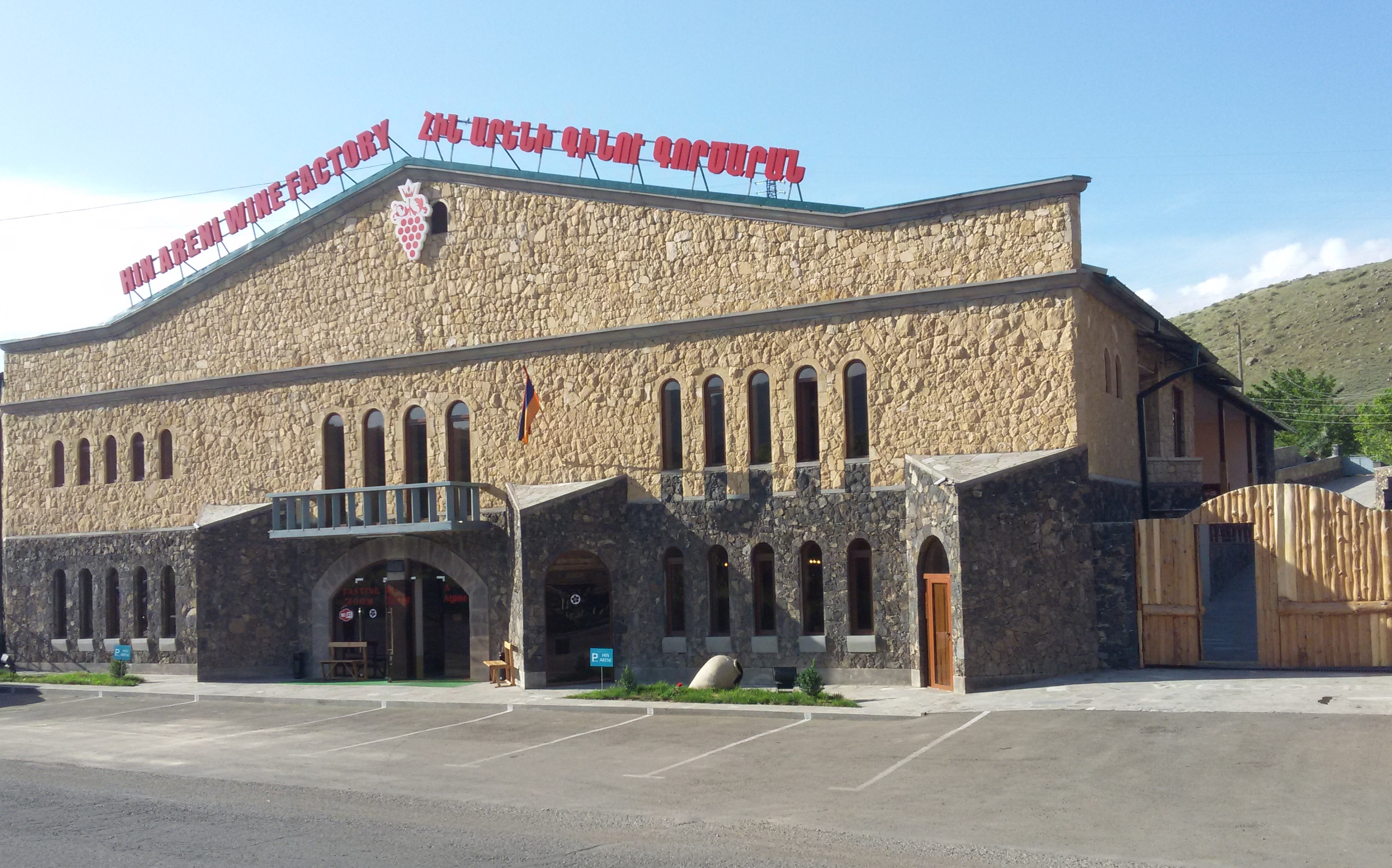
Hin Areni Winery

- Wine production: Vayots Dzor has a large number of wine producers (mainly producing under the category of "Areni wine"), including:
  - "Yacoubian-Hobbs" (wine), first vintage 2014
  - "Getap Wine Factory" (Vedi Alco Winery branch), opened in 1938 in Getap.
  - "Maran Winery", opened in 1992 in Yeghegnadzor.
  - "Areni Wine Factory", opened in 1994 in Areni.
  - "Old Bridge Winery", opened in 1998 in Yeghegnadzor.
  - "Getnatoun Winery" (wine, brandy), opened in 1999 in Yeghegnadzor.
  - “Vayk Winery”, opened in 2000 in Vayk.
  - "Ginekar Winery", opened in 2000 in Aghavnadzor.
  - "Mets Syunik Winery" ("Matevosyan Wine"), opened in 2001 in Aghavnadzor.
  - "Zorah Wines", opened in 2001 in Rind. The company's "2010 Zorah Karasi Areni Noir" was ranked in the 2012 Bloomberg's top 10 list.
  - "Areni Wine Winery", opened in 2003 in Areni.
  - "Hin Areni Vineyards", opened in 2007 in Areni.
  - "Trinity Canyon Vineyards", opened in 2009 in Aghavnadzor.
- Yeghegnadzor has many plants for cheese and other dairy products. The town is famous for its goat cheese produced by the "Golden Goat" factory founded in 2000. It is also home to the "Selim LLC" for dairy products founded in 2002. Other industrial firms of the town include the "Rafelgrig" for electrical products founded in 1968, the "Izoton" company for oak-wood made barrels for wine and brandy aging founded in 2003, and the Yeghegnadzor Cannery operating since 2015.
- Vayk is home to the "WCW of Vaik" building materials factory founded in 1968, the "Arpi Mineral Waters Factory" founded in 1973, and the "Meg Ararat" factory for tea production founded in 2008.
- Jermuk is known for its mineral water production. The town is home to the "Jermuk Group" CJSC, currently the main producer of Jermuk mineral water. Founded in 1999, Jermuk Group acquired the original water producing factory known as "Jermuk Mayr Gortsaran" operating since 1951. Another water bottling factory known as "Jermuk Service Enterprise" was founded in 2014.

There are many small plants for building materials production in the villages of Areni, Agarakadzor and Yeghegis, while the village of Malishka is home to a jewelry plant.

=== Tourism ===
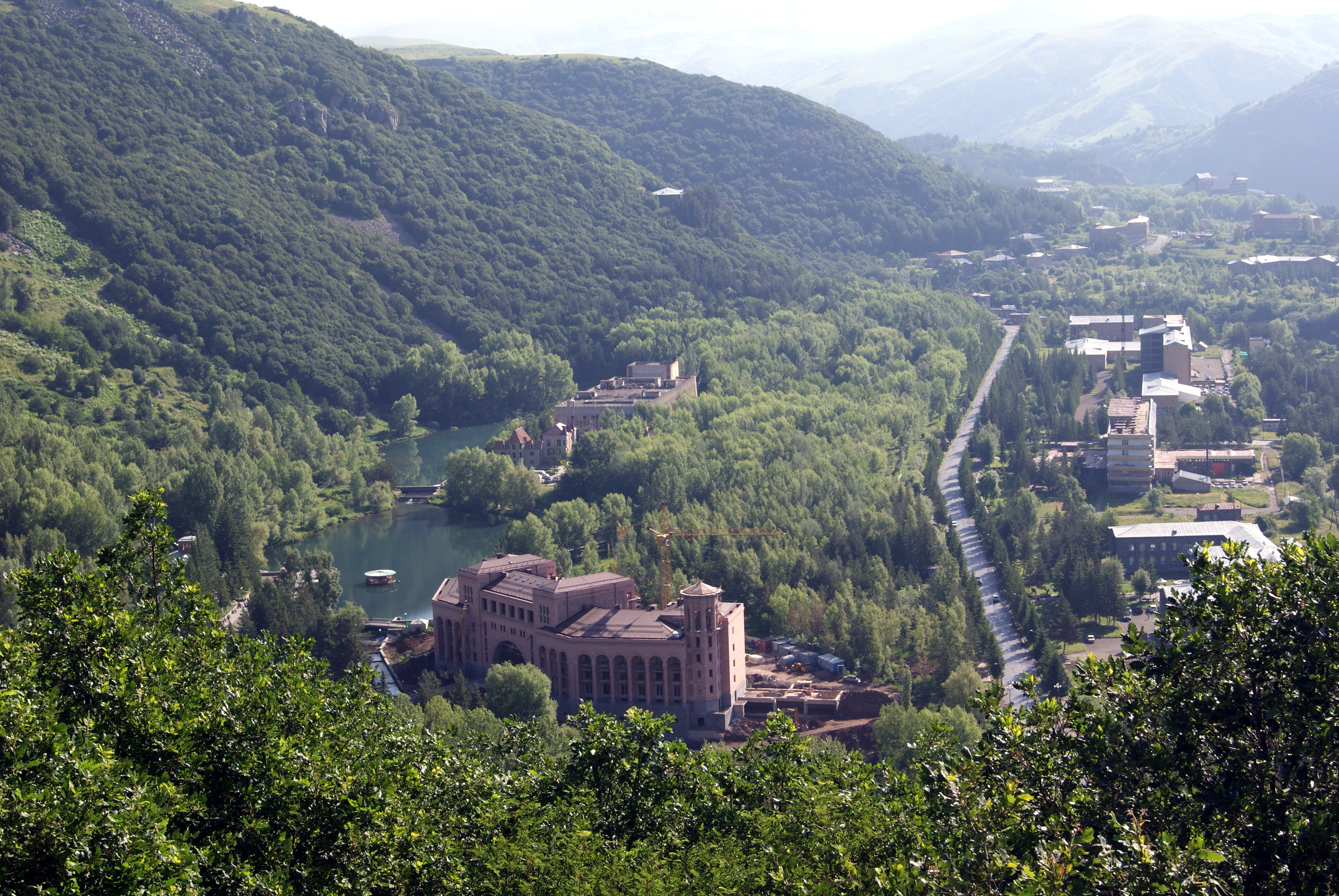
Jermuk spa town

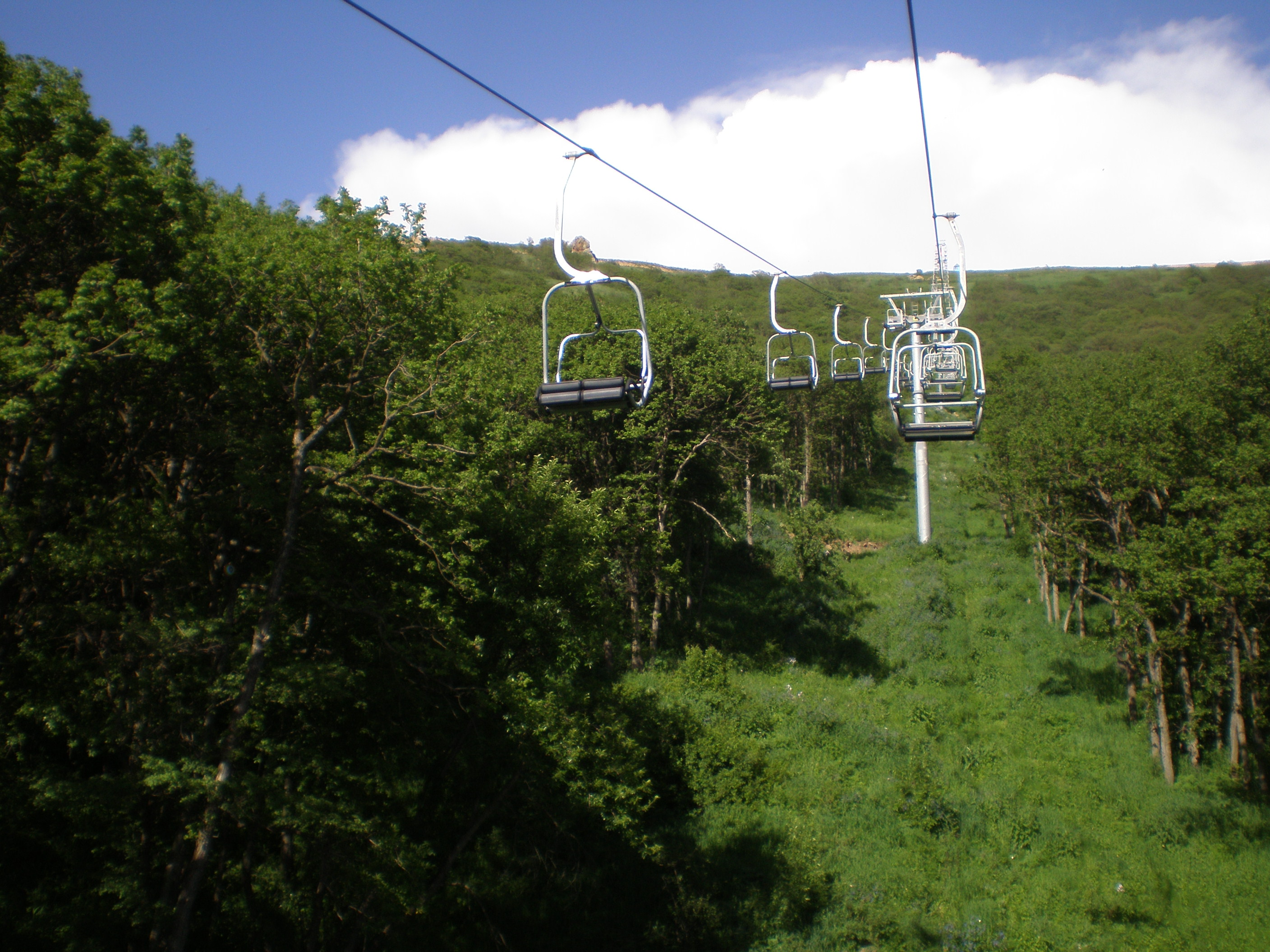
Jermuk ropeway

The cultural heritage and the natural monuments of the region attract a number of tourists. Jermuk and the surrounding forests are a tourist attraction with many sanatoriums, spa resorts and its ropeway. It is considered one of the centres of medical tourism in Armenia.

Some areas of the province are listed as protected wildlife sanctuaries, including the Herher Open Woodland Sanctuary, the Jermuk Forest Sanctuary, the Jermuk Hydrological Sanctuary, and the Yeghegnadzor Sanctuary.

The Mozrov Cave was found in 1980 near the village of Arpi. It is protected as a natural and cultural monument of Armenia.

== Education ==
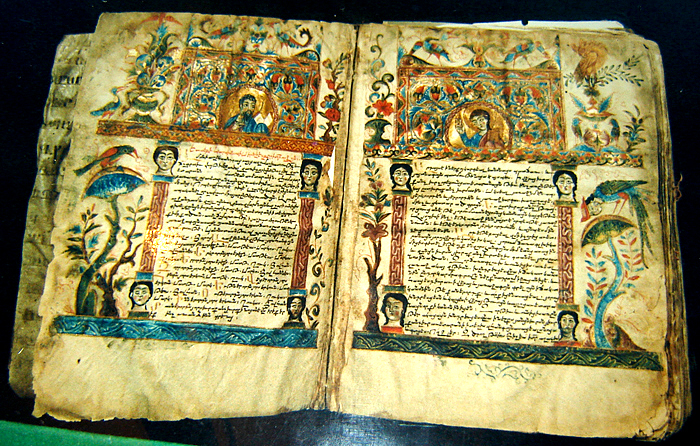
An Armenian manuscript of the Gladzor University, 13-14th centuries

Vayots Dzor was home to the medieval Armenian University of Gladzor that was established around 1280 by Nerses of Mush and operated until 1340 and "left behind a rich intellectual heritage".

Currently, the Yeghegnadzor branch of the Armenian State University of Economics is operating in the province since 2008.

As of the 2015–16 academic year, Vayots Dzor was home to 50 public schools as well as 17 pre-school kindergartens: The number of the students was around 6,300, while the academic staff included around 1,100 teachers. Around 1,000 children attended the kindergartens.

== Sport ==
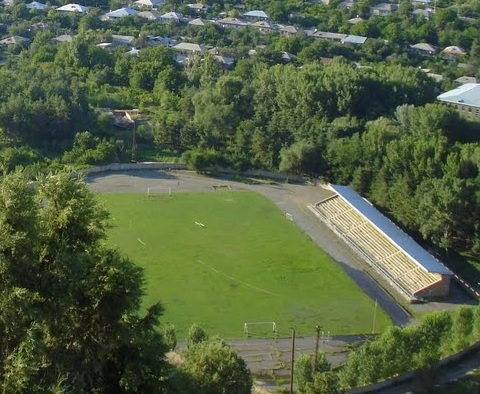
Arevik Stadium in Vayk

Arpa FC of Yeghegnadzor -founded as Momik FC in 1992- used to represent the town in the Armenian Premier League football competition. Like many other Armenian football clubs, Arpa FC was dissolved in early 2003 and is currently inactive from professional football. The towns of Vayk and Yeghegnadzor have a football stadium each with minor capacities.

Every year, during the month of August, Jermuk hosts the FIDE Grand Prix Jermuk chess tournament.

== Notable natives ==
- Ara Abramyan, Armenian businessman based in Russia.
- Narek Sargsyan, Armenian architect and politician.
- Kamsar (Kamo Sahakyan), renowned Armenian painter.
- Narine Dovlatyan, Armenian singer and actress.

== Gallery ==
Vayots Dzor

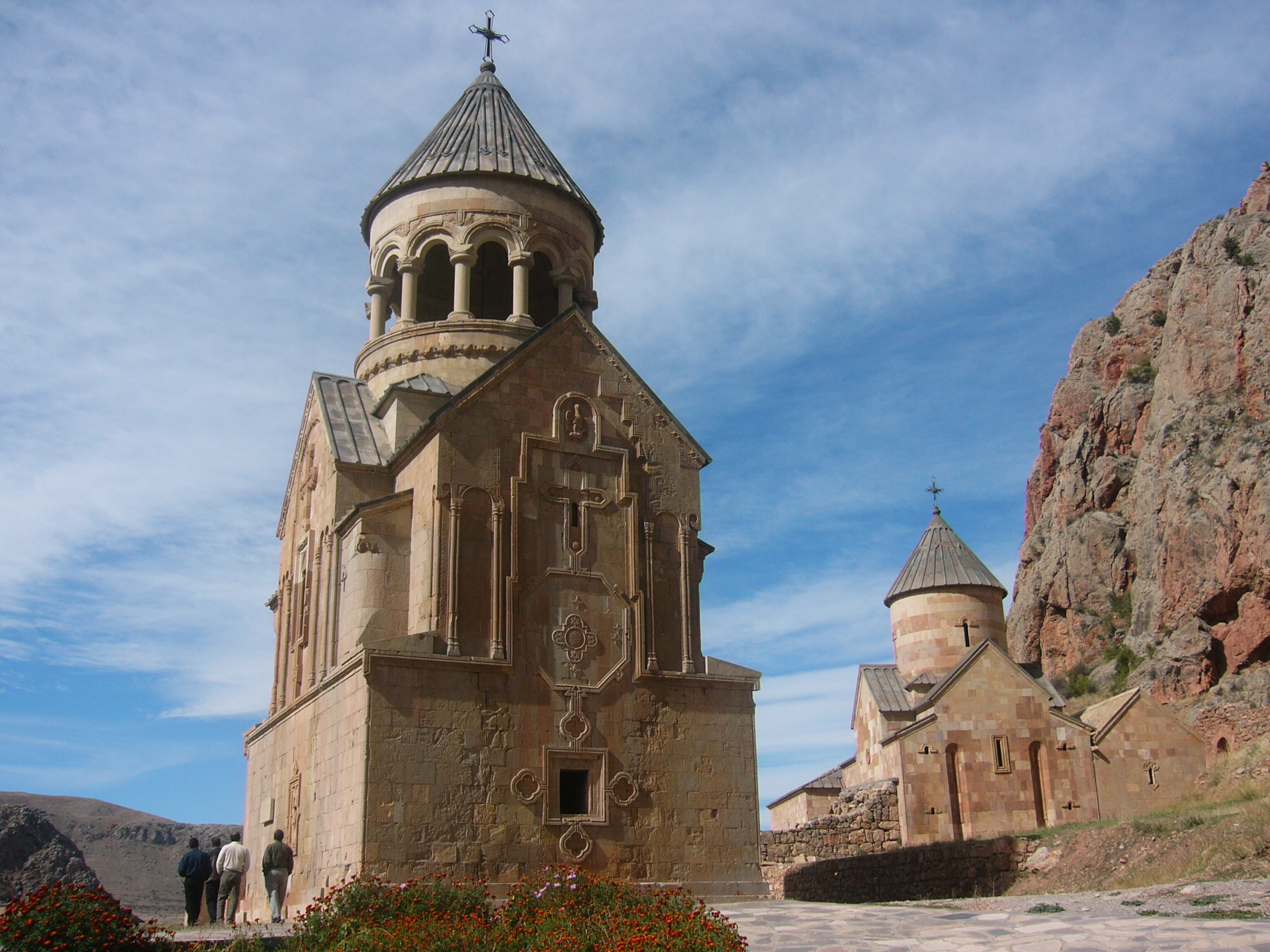
Noravank, 1205 AD

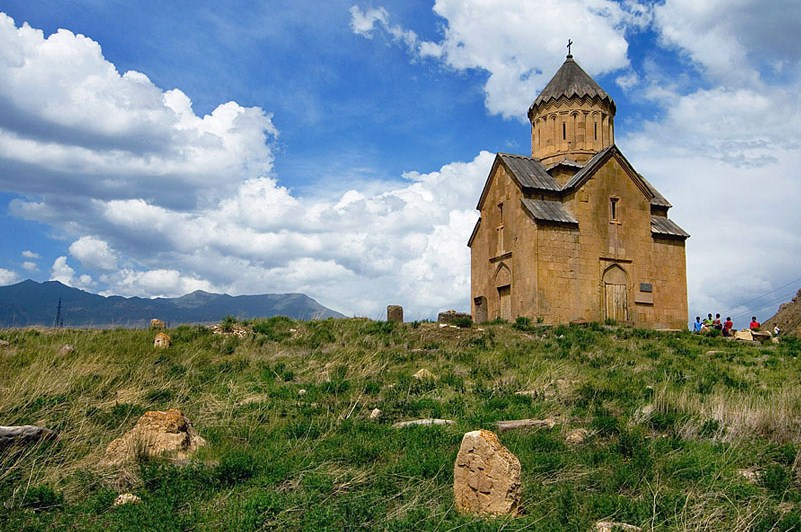
Areni Church, 1321 AD

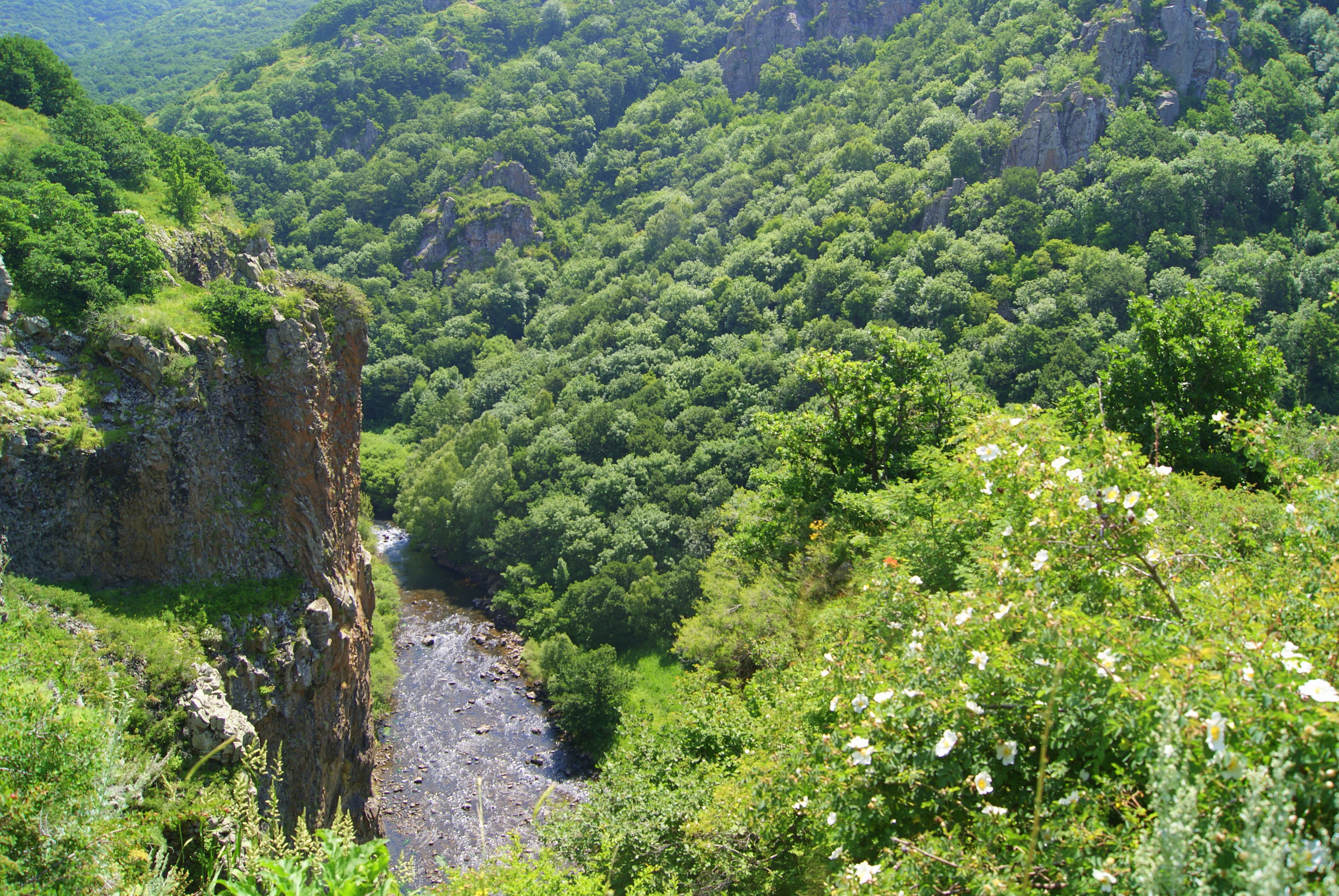
Jermuk Forest Sanctuary

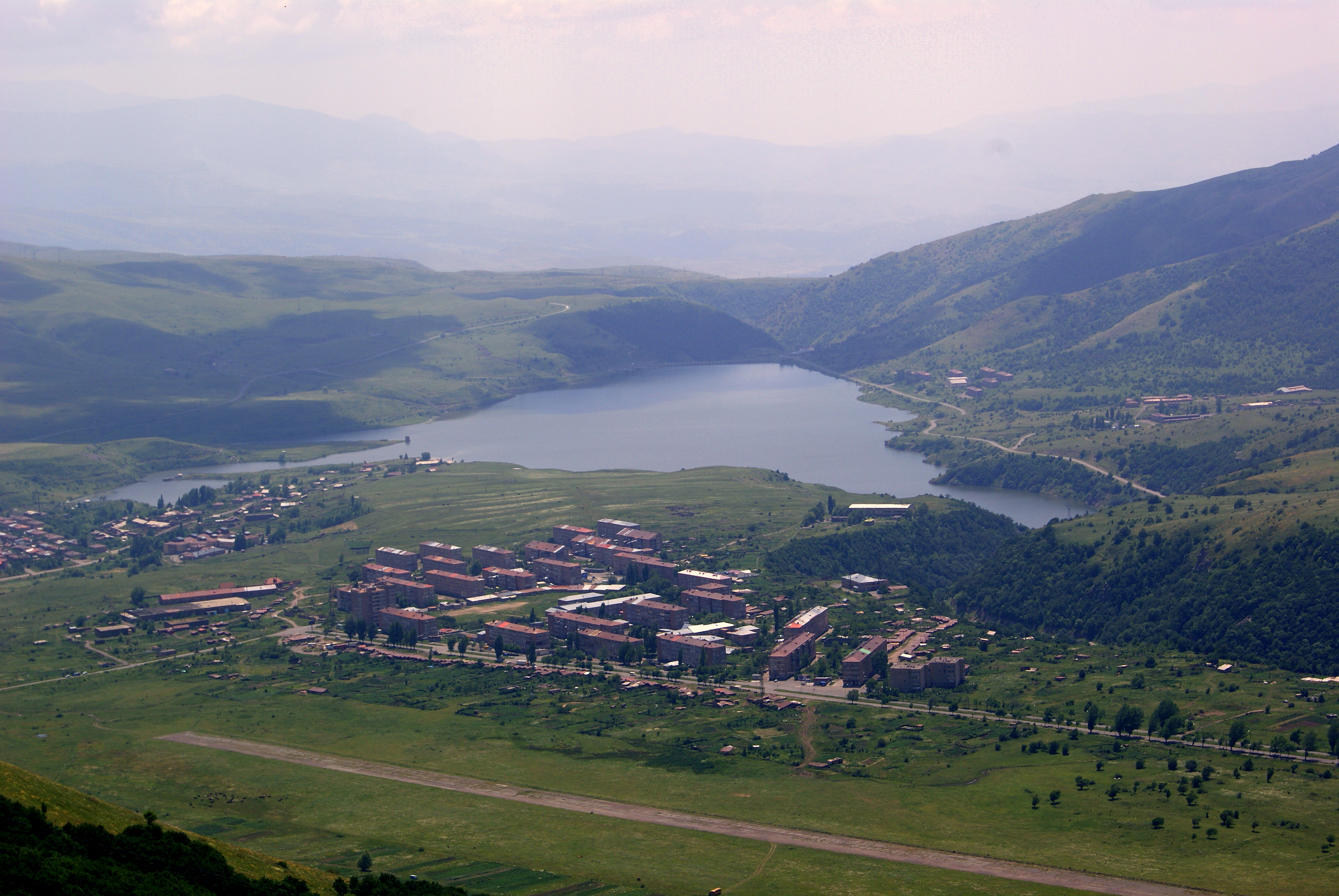
Kechut reservoir

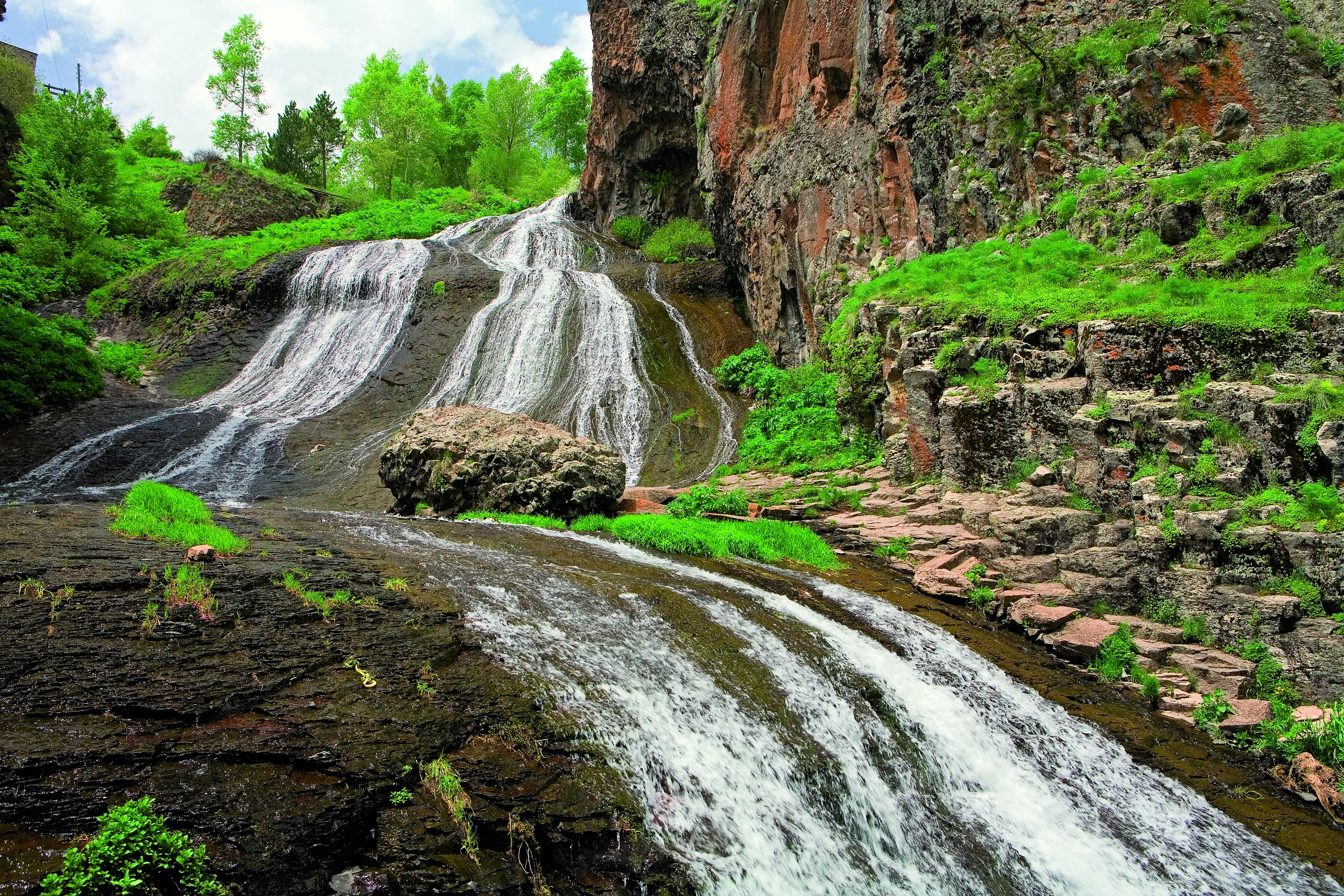
Jermuk Waterfall

== See also ==
- Areni-1 cave complex
- Areni (grape)
- Areni-1 winery
- Geshin
- Gharaghaya
- Gyabut
- Gyadikvank
- Syunik (historic province)
- Siunia dynasty
- Sharur-Daralagezsky Uyezd
