= Gharaghaya =

- Location within Armenia Location within Vayots Dzor
- Coordinates: 39°54′39″N 45°28′36″E
- Country: Armenia
- Marz (Province): Vayots Dzor
- Time zone: UTC+4 ( )
  - Summer (DST): UTC+5 ( )

Gharaghaya (also, Karakaya) is a town in the Vayots Dzor Province of Armenia.

== See also ==
- Vayots Dzor Province
