= Karakaya (surname) =

Karakaya is a Turkish surname. Notable people with the surname include:

- Dudu Karakaya (born 1985), Turkish female middle-distance runner
- Feridun Karakaya (1928-2004), Turkish actor
- Mevlüt Karakaya (born 1963), Turkish politician
- Tuğba Karakaya (born 1991), Turkish female middle-distance runner
- Tevhit Karakaya (born 1955), Turkish businessman and politician
- Tuncay Karakaya (born 1989), Turkish Paralympian goalball player

Other uses:

- Killing of the Karakaya family
