= Qaraqaya, Yardymli =

Qaragaya
- Municipality
- Location within Azerbaijan
- Coordinates: 38°51′20″N 48°12′59″E
- Country: Azerbaijan
- Rayon: Yardymli

Population
  - Total: 317
- Time zone: UTC+4 (AZT)
  - Summer (DST): UTC+5 (AZT)

Qaragaya (also, Karakaya) is a village and municipality in the Yardymli Rayon of Azerbaijan. It has a population of 317.
