= Arpi, Armenia =

Arpi Արփի
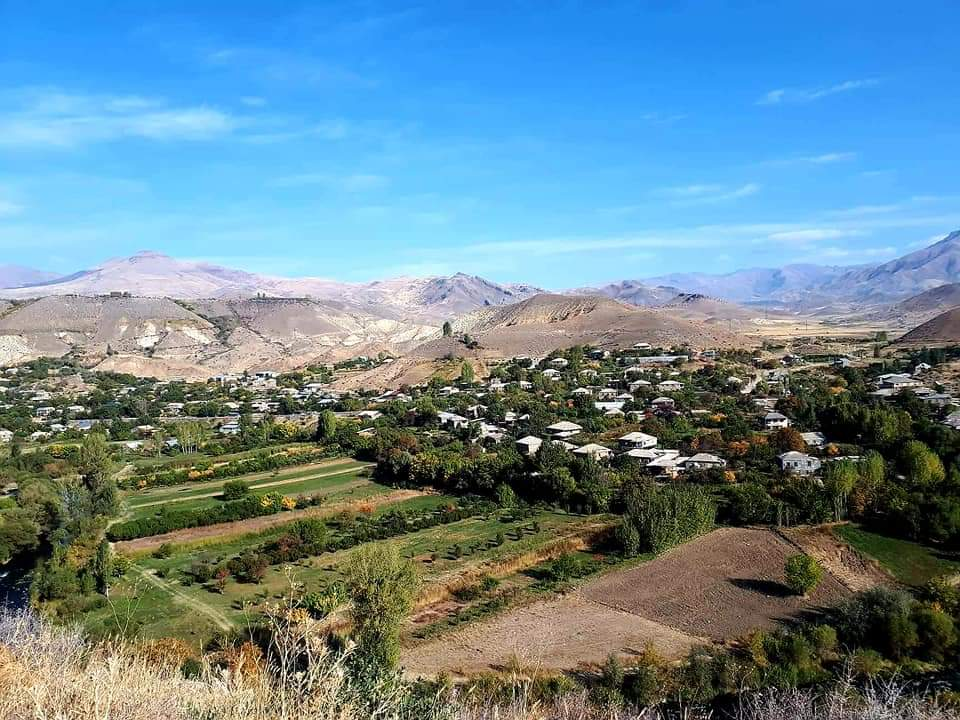

- Location within Armenia Location within Vayots Dzor
- Coordinates: 39°44′21″N 45°15′42″E
- Country: Armenia
- Province: Vayots Dzor
- Municipality: Areni

Population (2011)
  - Total: 1,149
- Time zone: UTC+4 (AMT)

Arpi (Armenian: Արփի) is a village in the Areni Municipality of the Vayots Dzor Province in Armenia. It is situated 8 km southwest of the province center, on the right bank of the Arpa River. The Yerevan-Meghri interstate highway passes through the village.

== Toponymy ==
The village is also known as Arpa.

== History ==
The village's establishment dates back to 1965 when it was formed based on the relocated population from the village of Gnishik.

== Historical heritage sites ==
The ancient settlement of Ertij is situated within the administrative boundaries of the Arpi community, which, according to tradition, served as a fortress for the region. However, in the 1930s, the village was abandoned as the last inhabitants departed due to the scarcity of drinking and irrigation water.

Adjacent to the old settlement lies the natural spring area known as "Jrov Vank," a pilgrimage site since ancient times. The spring serves as the village's sole source of drinking water. According to tradition, the water from this spring is believed to possess healing properties for skin diseases.

The community has five monuments dedicated to significant events and individuals. These include memorials for the victims of the Armenian genocide, the residents of Gnishik who lost their lives in the Second World War, and another honoring Vahik Levonyan, a hero of the same war.

Besides, the nearby area houses two caves named "Mozrov" and "Arj."

== Geography ==
Arpi community borders Aghavnadzor in the northwest, Getap in the northeast, Yeghegnadzor in the east, Areni and Gnishik communities in the south. The village stands at an average elevation of 1100 m above sea level and is crossed by the Arpa River, which is abundant in yellowfish and barbel species, while its source is home to trout. Besides, the village is known for its large silicate deposits.

=== Climate ===
The climate is very dry and continental.

== Demographics ==
The population dynamics of Arpi over the years:

Year	1970	1979	1989	2001	2011
Population	1360	928	771	1138	1149

== Economy and culture ==
The primary occupations of the population include cultivation, fruit growing, animal husbandry, and beekeeping. The village is provided with drinking and irrigation water.

The village has a secondary school, medical station, village hall, kindergarten, petrol station, market, and recreational areas. The school, named after Vahik Levonyan, a hero from the Second World War, has undergone thorough renovation and is well-maintained. A bust of the hero, sculpted by Adibek Grigoryan, is close to the school. The village library functions and cultural events are held in the school hall. The community is home to two wine workshops and one stone processing workshop.

== Gallery ==
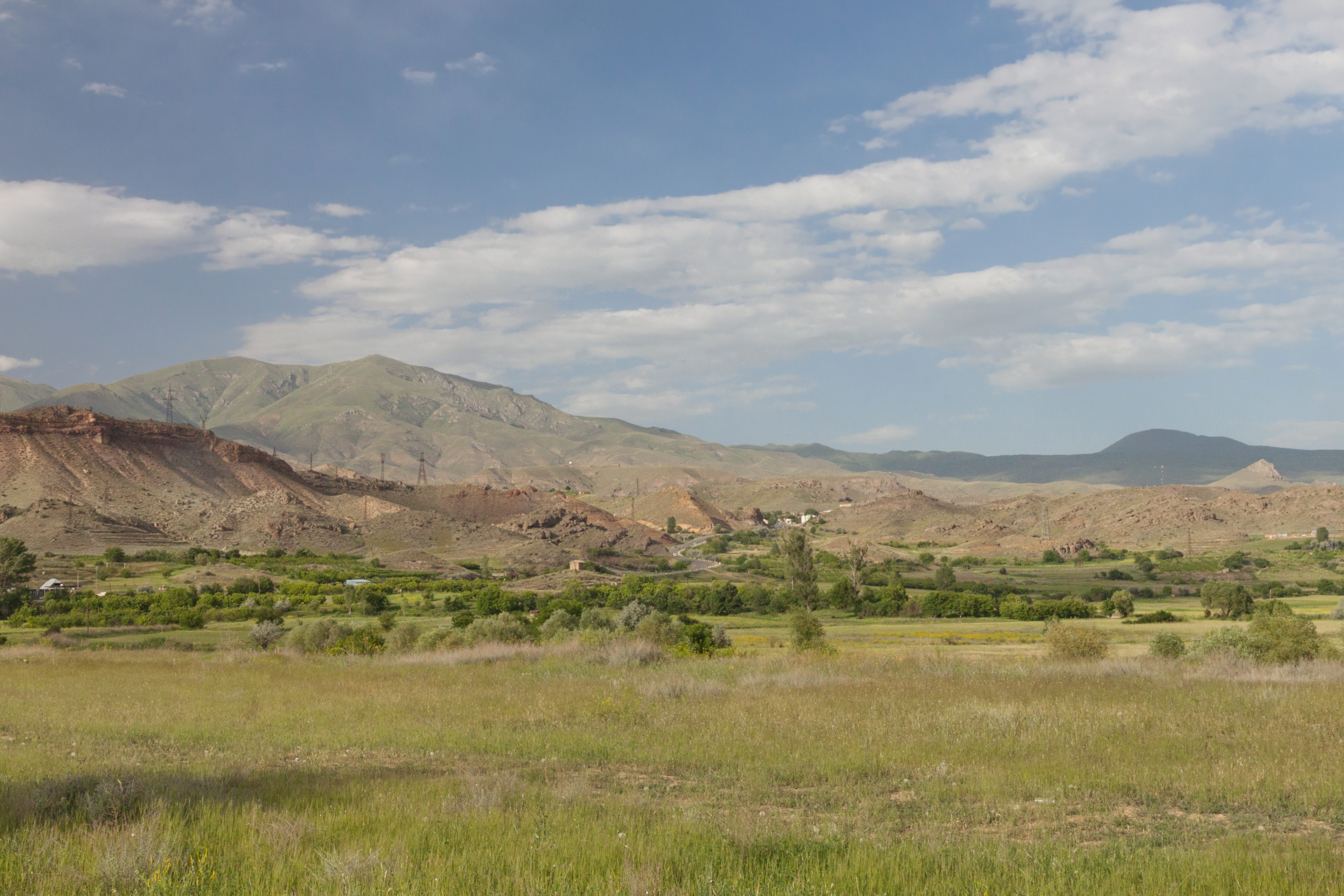

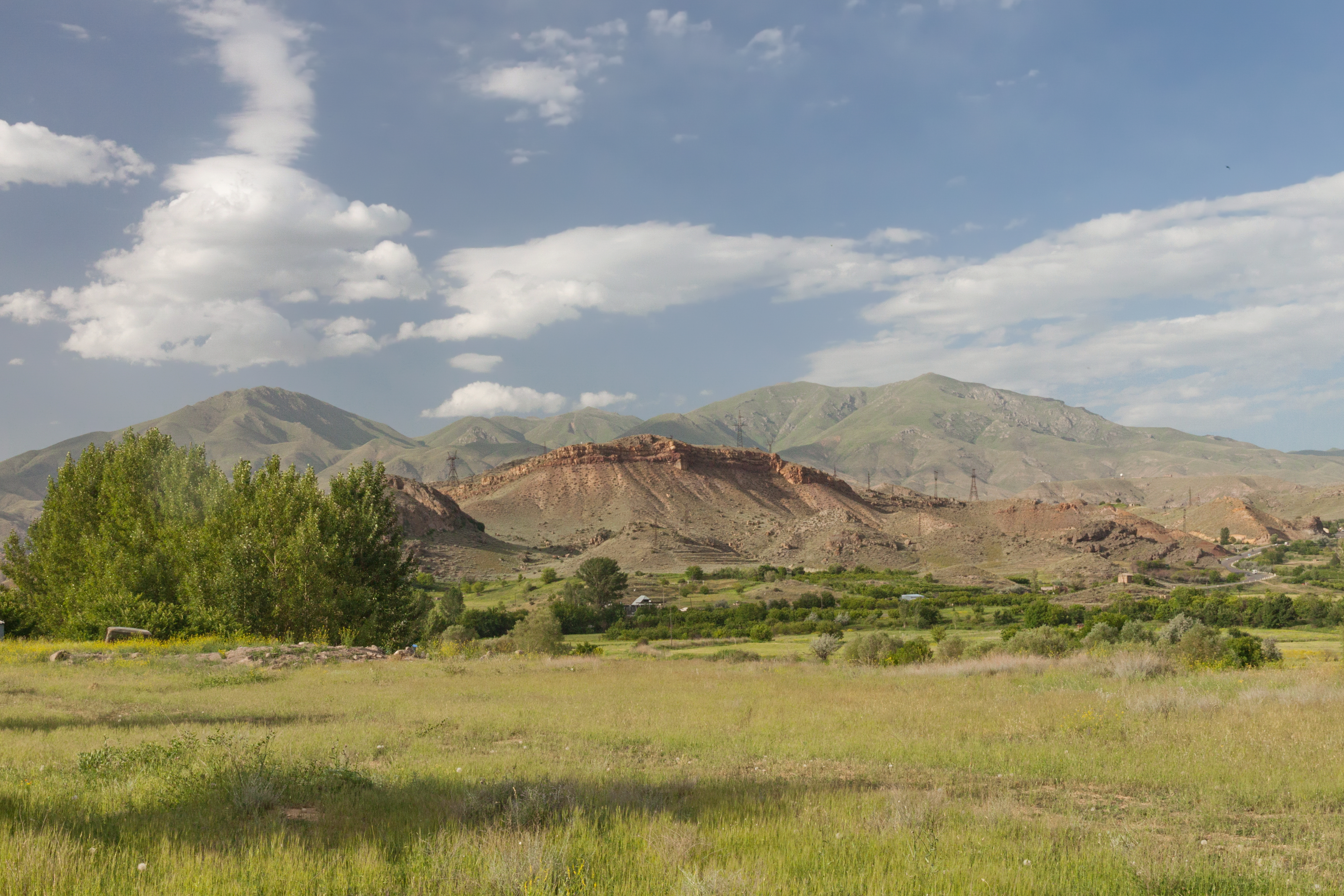

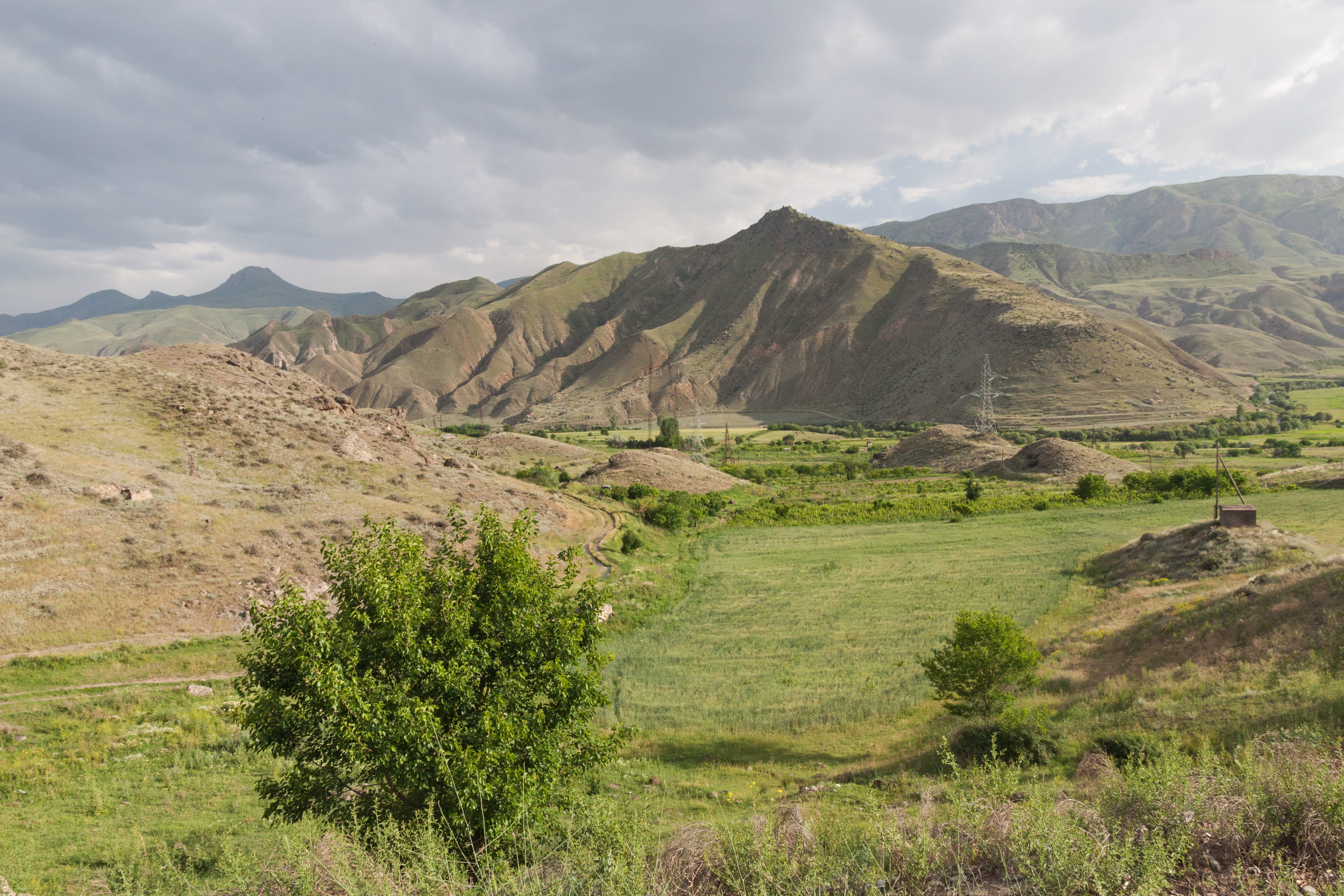

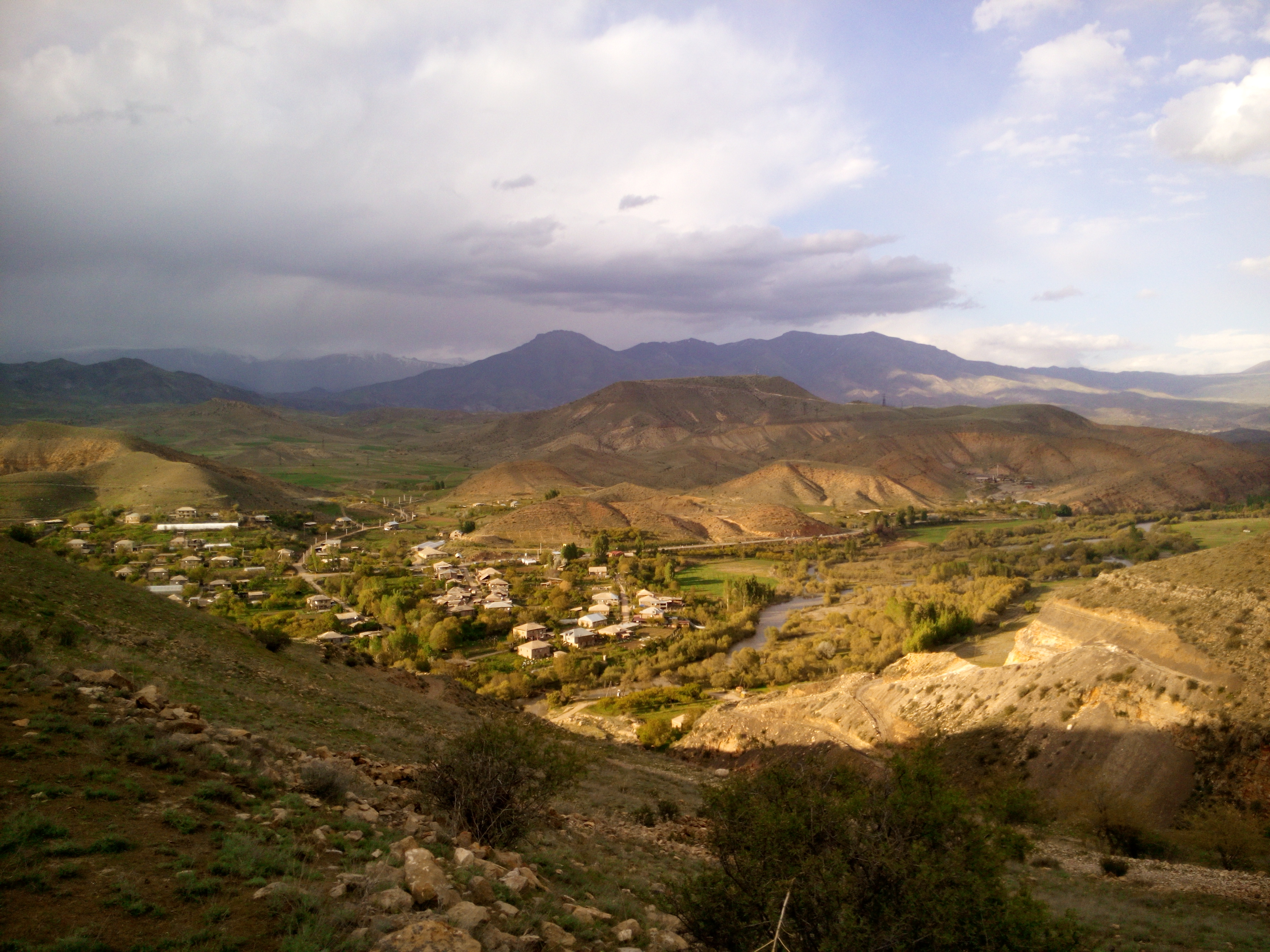
