= Arshaluys P. Tarverdyan =

Armenian agricultural scientist and academic

Arshaluys Tarverdyan
- Tarverdyan in 2016
- Born: October 15, 1945 (age 80); Yelpin, Vayots Dzor Province, Armenian SSR
- Citizenship: Armenia
- Known for: Plant stem mechanics, cutting technology
- Awards: Anania Shirakatsi Medal (2000); Honored Scientist of Armenia (2011)
- Scientific career
- Fields: Agricultural engineering, mechanics
- Workplaces: Armenian National Agrarian University

Arshaluys Poghos Tarverdyan (Armenian: Արշալույս Պողոսի Թարվերդյան, born 15 October 1945) is an Armenian agricultural engineer and academic. He is a full member of the National Academy of Sciences of Armenia and served as rector of the Armenian National Agrarian University from 1998 to 2018.

== Biography ==
Tarverdyan was born on 15 October 1945 in Yelpin, located in the Vayots Dzor region of the Armenian SSR. He graduated from high school with a gold medal in 1962. He enrolled at the Armenian Agricultural Institute in the Faculty of Agricultural Mechanization, specializing in motor transport, and completed his degree in October 1968.

He worked as an engineer in the technical department of the Ministry of Motor Transport of the Armenian SSR. He completed military service from May 1969 to May 1970 and returned to the ministry. He joined the Armenian Agricultural Institute in September 1971 as head of the Department of Strength of Materials laboratory. He became an assistant professor in 1977, defended his Candidate of Sciences dissertation in 1979, and received the title of associate professor in 1983.

Tarverdyan became head of the institute's preparatory department in 1980. He was appointed Dean of Distance Education in 1994, and in 1997 became head of department with vice-rector status. He defended his doctoral dissertation in 1997 and was named professor in 2002.

During his tenure as rector, the university expanded its international cooperation programs in agricultural education and research. He also oversaw the development of the university's laboratory facilities, experimental farms, and training centers. As rector, he led university delegations to establish cooperative ties with Nagorno-Karabakh's agricultural sector.

He was elected a corresponding member of the National Academy of Sciences of Armenia in December 2006 and a full member (academician) in December 2014. He became chief researcher in the Department of Field Management and Animal Husbandry Mechanization at the Research Institute of Agricultural Mechanization and Automation in 2019.

== Scientific and pedagogical work ==
Tarverdyan researches agricultural mechanics, stem structural properties, and cutting tool dynamics. His studies examined anatomical and morphological patterns of crop stems, measuring elastic modulus, density, and moments of inertia across different plant heights.

He analyzed stem cutting with sliding to lower energy consumption during harvesting operations. His research contributed to the design of agricultural tools, including rotary tillers with vertical rotation axes for orchard and vineyard cultivation, and vibro-cutting devices for stem harvesting. His recent studies focus on the dynamic-energy analysis of rotary tillers and the motion stability of agricultural robotic platforms.

Tarverdyan authored the textbook Theoretical Mechanics (Statics) (2006) for use at the university. He published the Russian-language monograph Application of Vibration Theory in Agricultural Mechanics in 2014.

He has published 250 scientific works, including 16 monographs, 3 textbooks, and 50 patents.

== Awards and honors ==
- Medal of Anania Shirakatsi (2000)
- Timiryazev Gold Medal of the Russian Federation (2004)
- Socrates Prize and Medal (2007)
- Honored Scientist of the Republic of Armenia (2011)
- Medal of Gratitude of Artsakh (2011)

== Selected publications ==
- Tarverdyan, A. P.; Minasyan, R. S.; Kosemyan, E. S. (2001). Strength of Materials (Theory and Problems). Yerevan: Asoghik.
- Tarverdyan, Arshaluys P. (2004). Essential Principles for Development of Rotary Cutting Devices. Beuren; Stuttgart: Verlag Grauer. ISBN 3-86186-452-5.
- Tarverdyan, A. P. (2006). Theoretical Mechanics (Statics) (in Armenian). Yerevan: Armenian State Agrarian University.
- Tarverdyan, A. P. (2014). Application of Vibration Theory in Agricultural Mechanics (in Russian). Yerevan: Gitutyun Publishing House. ISBN 978-5-8080-1118-2.
- Tarverdyan, A. P. (2019). Features of Mechanization of Forage Harvesting Operations in Mountainous Conditions. Yerevan: Armenian National Agrarian University Publishing House.
- Tarverdyan, A. P.; Altunyan, A. V. (2021). "Geometric and kinematic parameters of vibrating knife in the development of cutting machines". Journal of Agricultural Engineering. 52 (3): 1147. doi:10.4081/jae.2021.1147.
- Tarverdyan, A. P.; Altunyan, A. V.; Grigoryan, A. S. (2024). "Force Analysis of a Rotary Tiller with a Vertical Rotation Axis". INMATEH - Agricultural Engineering. 72 (1): 454–465. doi:10.35633/inmateh-72-40.
- Tarverdyan, A. P.; Khachatryan, A.; Altunyan, A.; Papyan, S.; Grigoryan, A. (2026). "Study of the Motion Stability and Operational Smoothness of an Agricultural Robotic Platform". INMATEH - Agricultural Engineering. 79 (2): 955–970.
