= Ertij Fort =

Armenian fort

- Vayots Dzor Province, Armenia
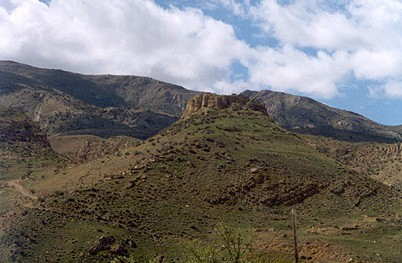
- The fort of Ertij upon a hill in Arpi.

Site information
- Type: Fortress
- Open to the public: Yes
- Condition: Some walls remain.

Location
- Shown within Armenia
- Coordinates: 39.7304139°N 45.2686417°E

Site history
- Built: 13th century
- Materials: Stone

Ertij is a fort built during the 13th century. It is situated upon a hill adjacent to the village of Arpi in the Vayots Dzor Province of Armenia. Nearby in the gorge carved by the Arpa River is the cave shrine of Jrovank.
