= Amaghu =

Amaghu Ամաղու
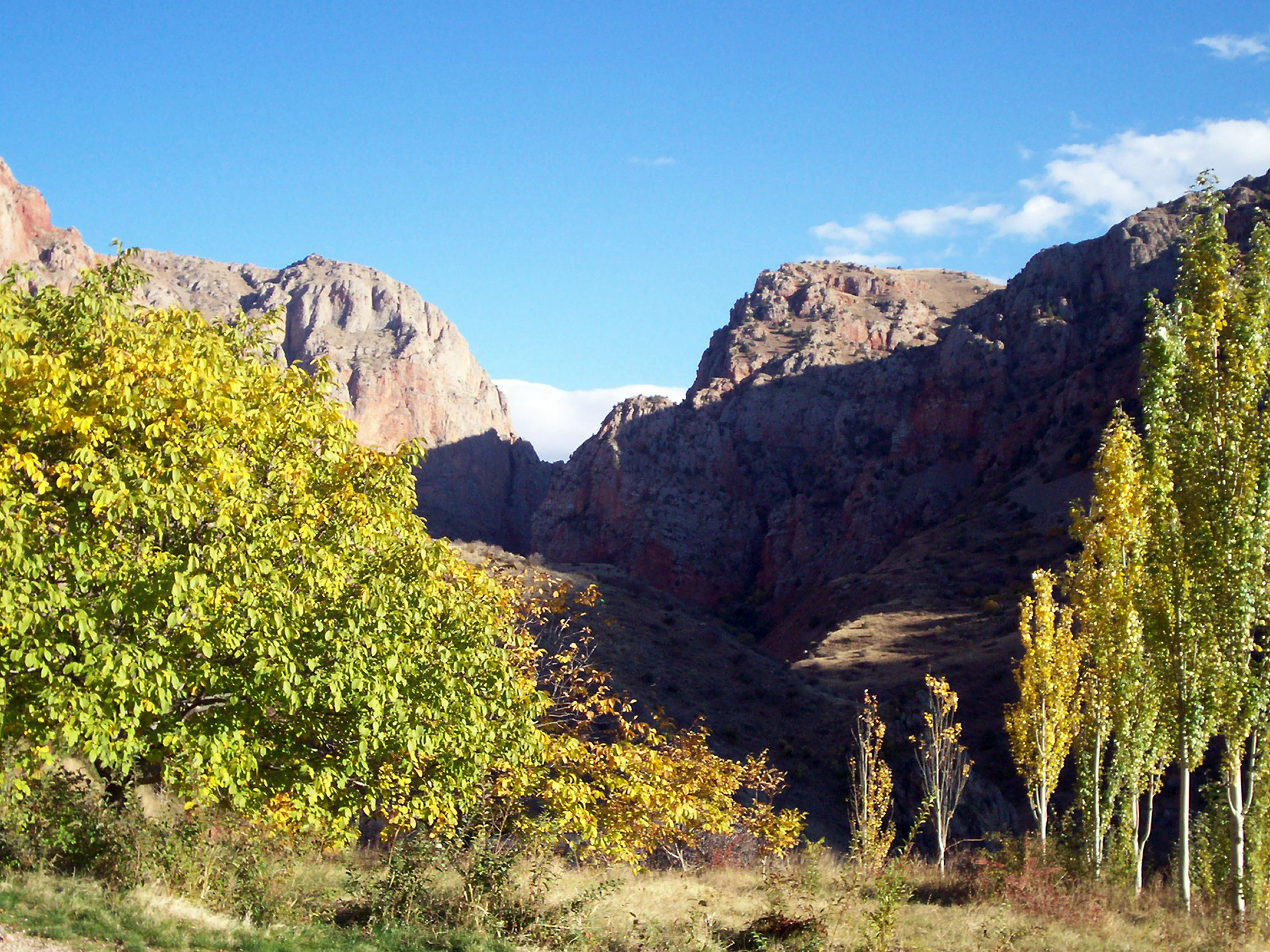

- Location within Armenia
- Coordinates: 39°40′53″N 45°12′59″E
- Country: Armenia
- Province: Vayots Dzor
- Municipality: Areni

Population (2011)
  - Total: 0
- Time zone: UTC+4 (AMT)

Amaghu (Armenian: Ամաղու) is an abandoned village in the Areni Municipality of the Vayots Dzor Province of Armenia.

== History ==
The village was populated by Azerbaijanis. In March-April 1989, the ethnic Azeri population was deported because of the Nagorno-Karabakh conflict. Most of the population went to Nakhichevan. Armenian refugees who were deported from different settlements of Nakhichevan and Azerbaijan settled in the village.

== Gallery ==
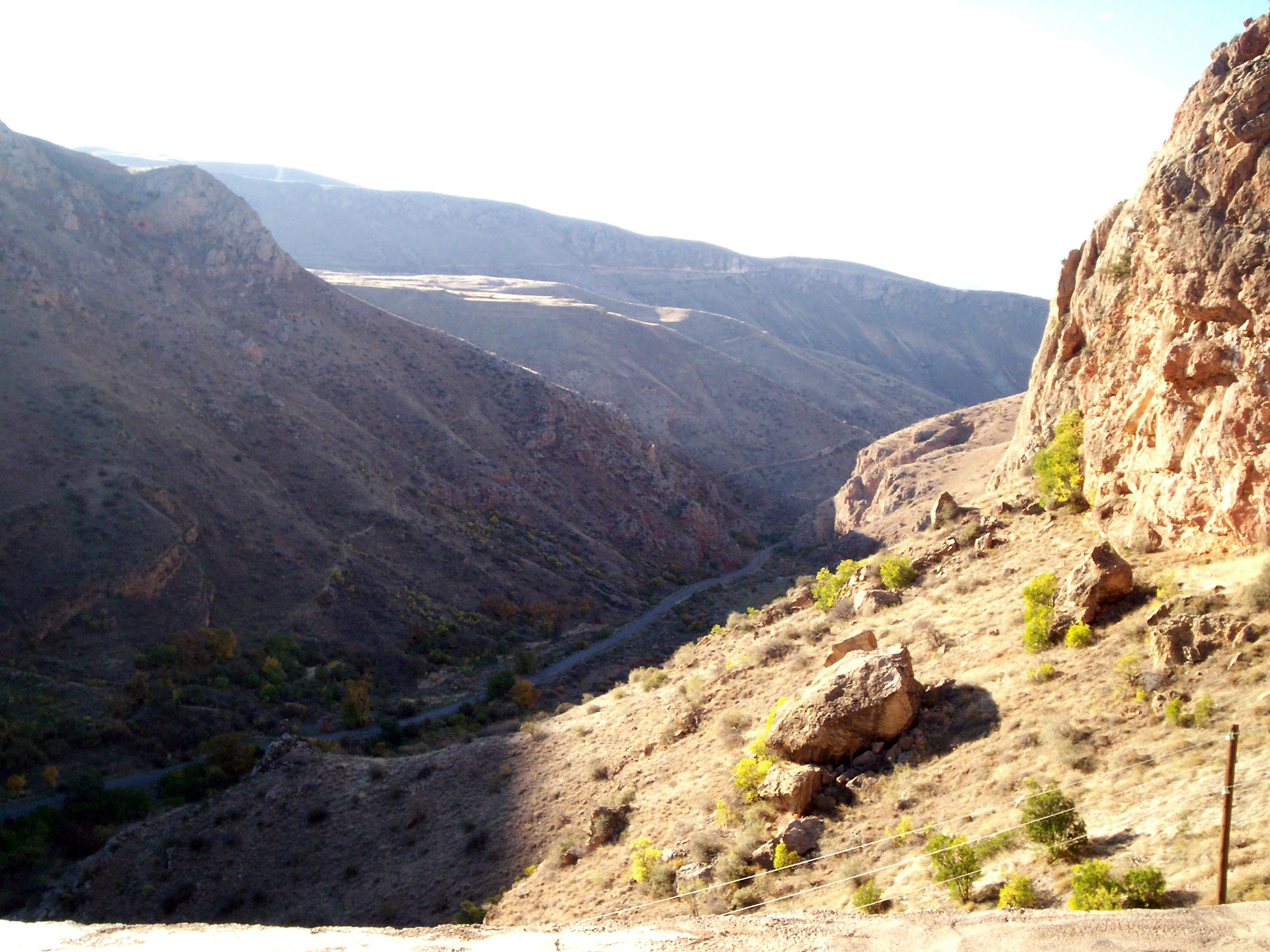

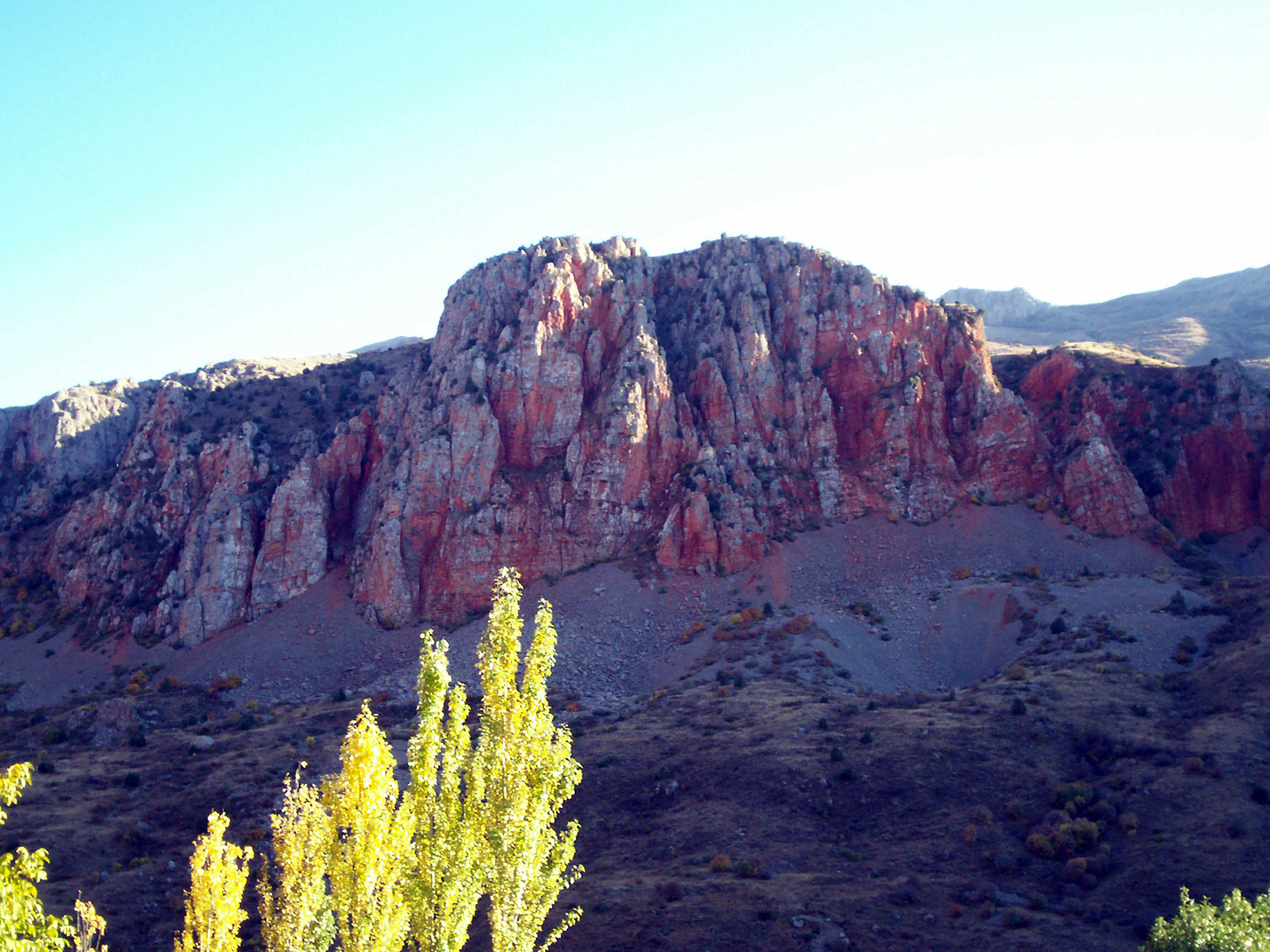

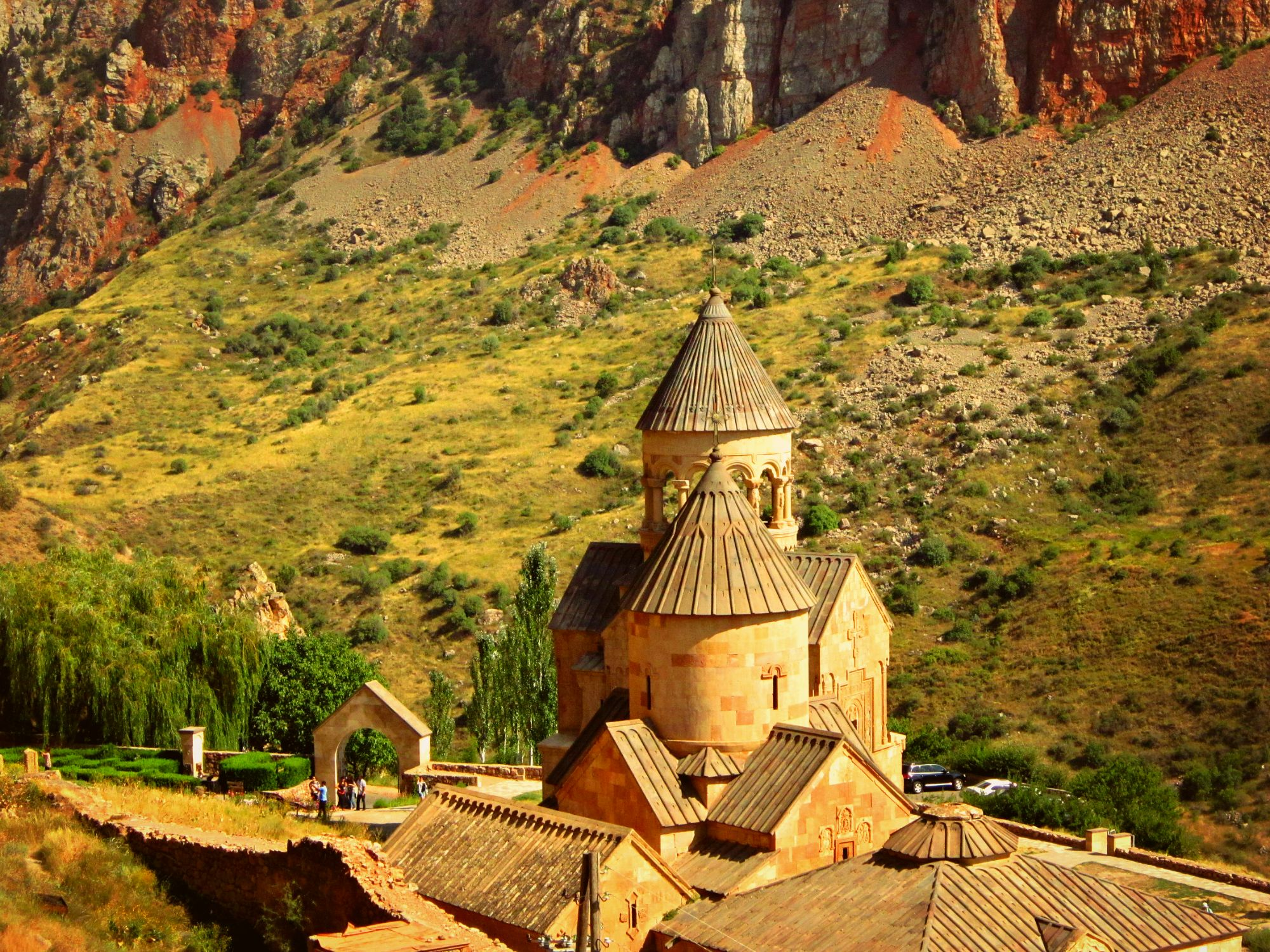
Noravank
