= Yelpin =

Village in Armenia

Yelpin Ելփին
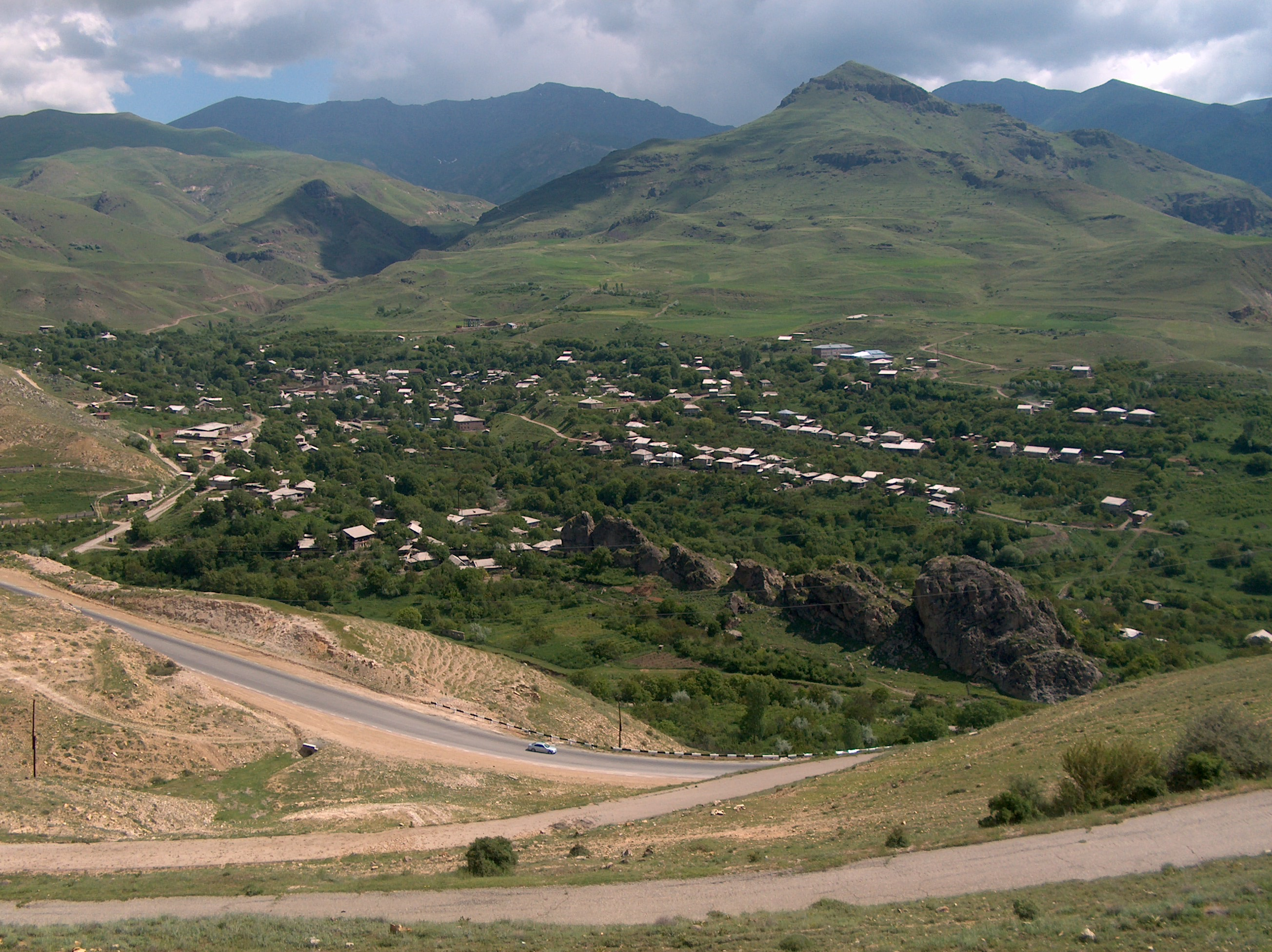

- Location within Armenia Location within Vayots Dzor
- Coordinates: 39°48′21″N 45°06′37″E
- Country: Armenia
- Province: Vayots Dzor
- Municipality: Areni
- Established: 1828

Population (2011)
  - Total: 1,209
- Time zone: UTC+4 (AMT)

Yelpin (/jɛlˈpiːn/; Armenian: Ելփին) is a village in the Areni Municipality of the Vayots Dzor Province in southwestern Armenia, located on the Armenia–Azerbaijan border.

== History ==
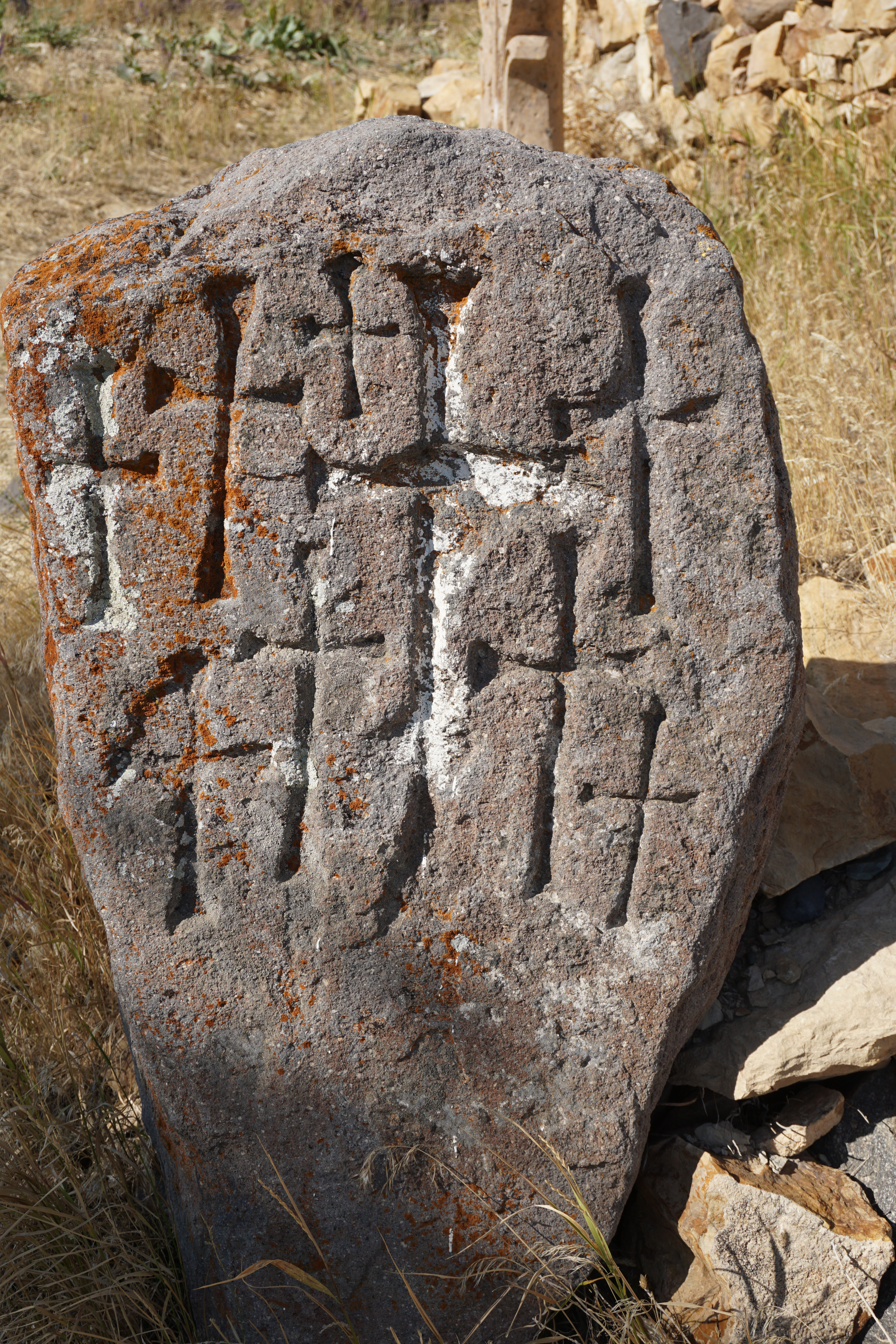
Khachkar in Yelpin

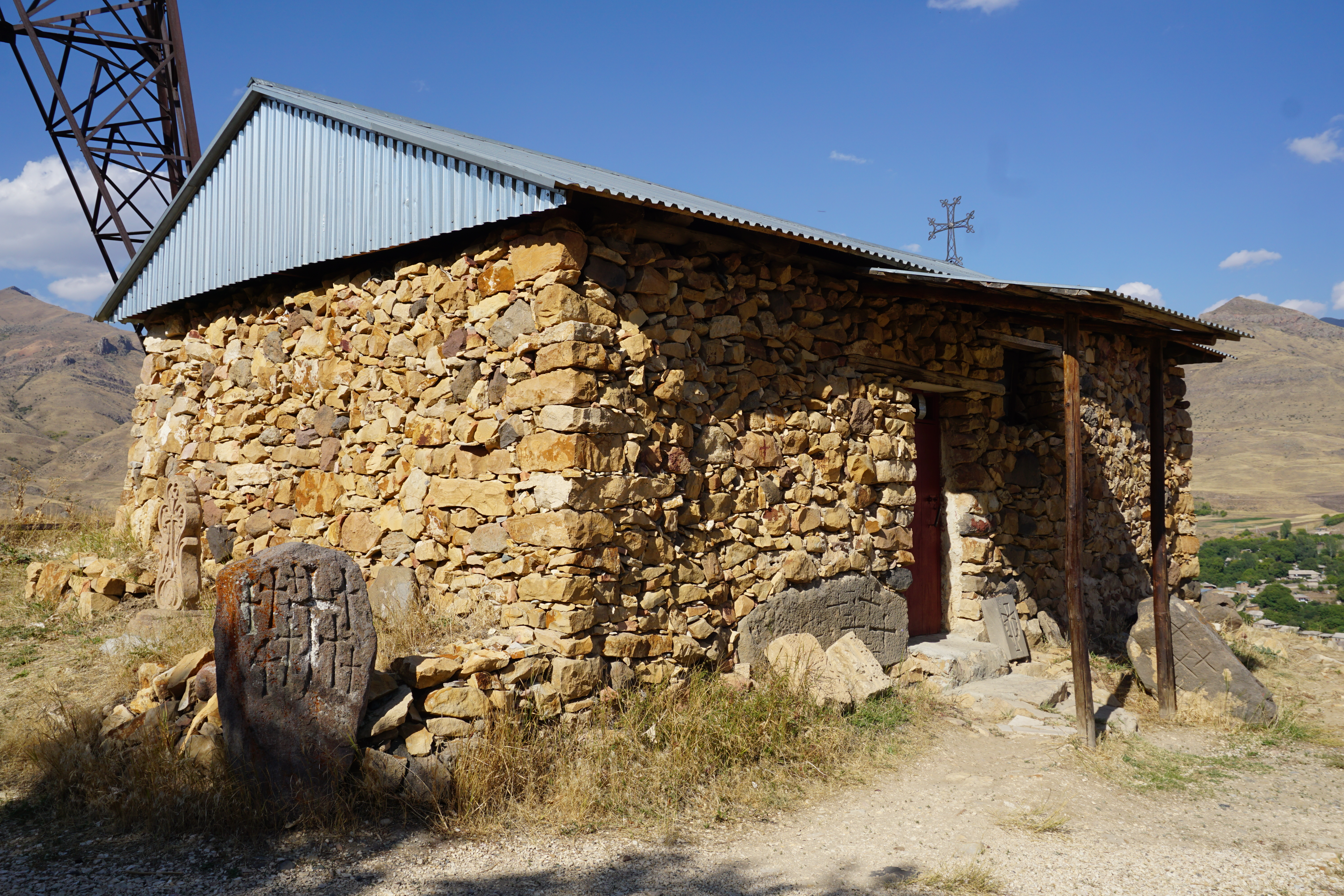
Tukh Manuk in Yelpin

Yelpin community was established in 1828, after the Russo-Persian War (1826-1828). The founders (ethnic Armenians) fled from the Persian regions of Khoy and Salmas. The community was founded in the place of the village of Nrbuyn, and inherited its name, which gradually transformed to Nrbuyn, Nrbin, Irpin and finally to Yelpin. 13th-century Armenian historian Stephen Orbelian, in his book Patmutyun Sisakan (History of Sis) mentions Adopen, Khndzorut, Kechut, Chochanak, Chavadzor, Mokhrot and other historical places to be located in the administrative territory of Yelpin. However, the territory of Yelpin has been inhabited since the Stone Age, evidence of which can be found in numerous caves in the vicinity. The Bronze Age is the best represented and archaeological expeditions are very active in the area. Found here are numerous artifacts, such as stone and metal instruments, arms, pottery and many others, which are kept in the Yeghegnadzor ethnographic museum.

== Historical heritage sites ==
The community is surrounded by monasteries and structures having cultural value. To the northwest of the village, remnants of a medieval fortress can be found, 10 km away there are numerous ancient decorated gravestones. Following the old road to Aghavnadzor, remnants of the Geshin settlement can be found, with a famous cave nearby․ To the southeast of the village, there is the 14th-century sanctuary of Toukh Manuk and medieval Didivan monastery in Gndasar, preserved from the times of the Bagratuni dynasty. The Noravank monastic complex (12th century) is located nearby, which is a UNESCO heritage site.

== Economy and culture ==
Main occupations of the community members are gardening, land cultivation, animal husbandry, poultry farming and bee-keeping. In 2005 a new church was built in the village center.

== Geography ==
Yelpin is located 97 km away from Yerevan, and 27 km away from provincial center Yeghegnadzor. The village is located on the border to the Nakhchivan Autonomous Republic of Azerbaijan to the south, with the lands of Zangakatun to the west, and Chivagyugh to the southwest.

Community lands stretch from 1400 to 2800 m, whereas the settlement itself is located at 1545 m above the sea level.

=== Nature ===
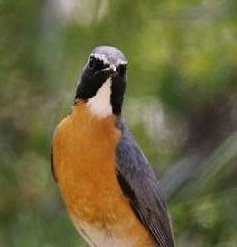
Irania gutturalis

==== Flora ====
The flora of the area is quite rich. The vicinity of Yelpin has always been known for its abundance of alpine herbs and officinal plants. In the ancient times there was an alpine settlement named Seyids (meaning medicine people), the inhabitants of which practiced phytotherapy and traditional medicine. The most common used were mentha, rosa canina, Armenian ginseng and many others. There are numerous endemic and endangered plants registered in the national Red Book, such as Pragnos lophoptera, Seseli leptocladium (endemic), Cephalorrinhus kirpicznikovii, Hieracium pannosum, Steptorhamphus czerepanovii, Acanthophyllum pungens, Astragalus karakuschensis, Vicia cappadocica, Hipericum formosissimum, Crocus speciosus, Gladiolus atroviolaceus, Iris caucasicus, Iris pseudocaucasica, Juglans regia, Salvia grossheimii, Allium akkaka, Asphodeline dendroides, Secale vavilovii, and Triticum boeoticum.

==== Fauna ====
The vicinity of Yelpin is known for its fauna, especially birds. The Red Book animals and birds are the following: Ursus arctos syriacus, Capra aegarus aegarus, Accipiter brevipes, Ciraetus gallicus gallicus, Lanius senator niloticus, Silvia hortensis crassirostris, Luscinia svecica accidentalis, Irania gutturalis, Sitta tephronota obscura, Tichodroma muraria, Carposiza brachidactyla, Eumeces schnederi, Mabuya aurata, and Vipera raddei.

== Gallery ==
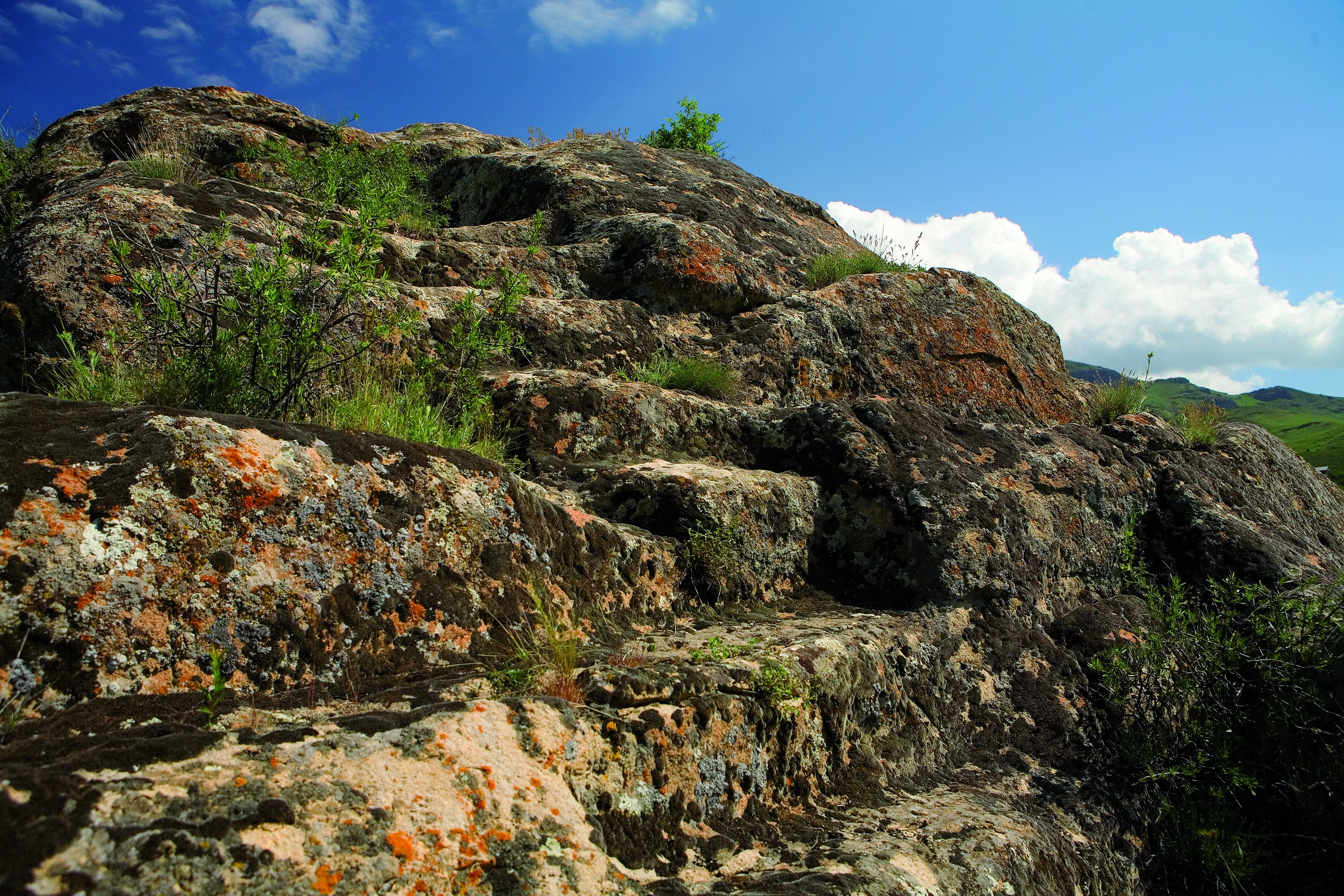
Yelpin Crag Stairs

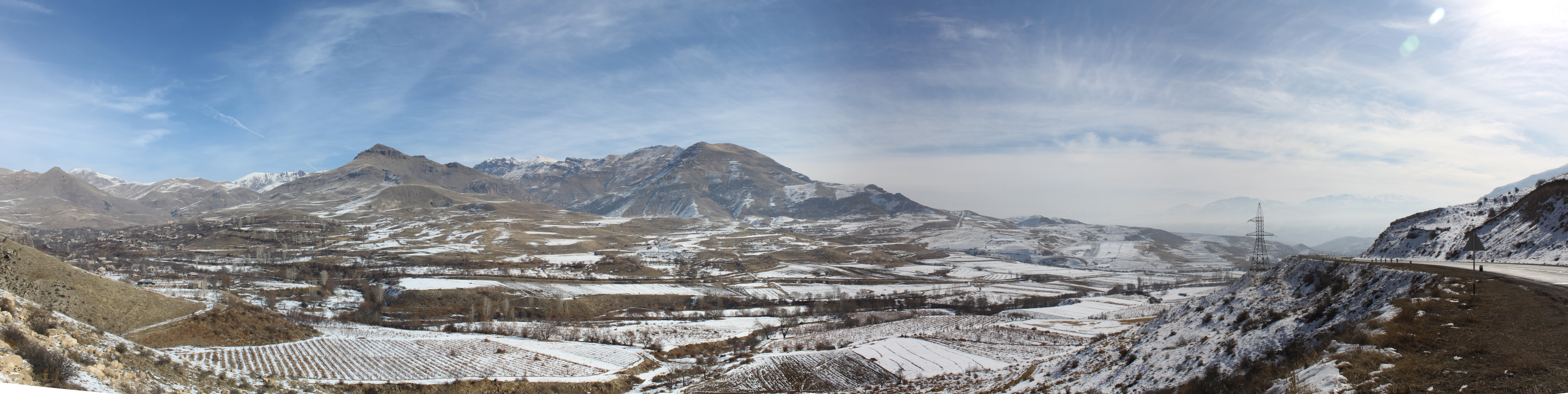
Panorama of Yelpin in winter

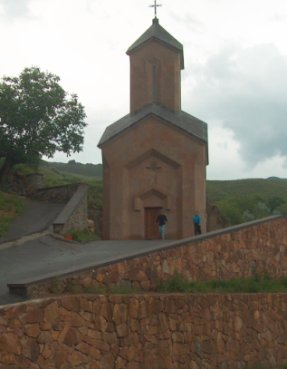
Yelpin Church built in 2005

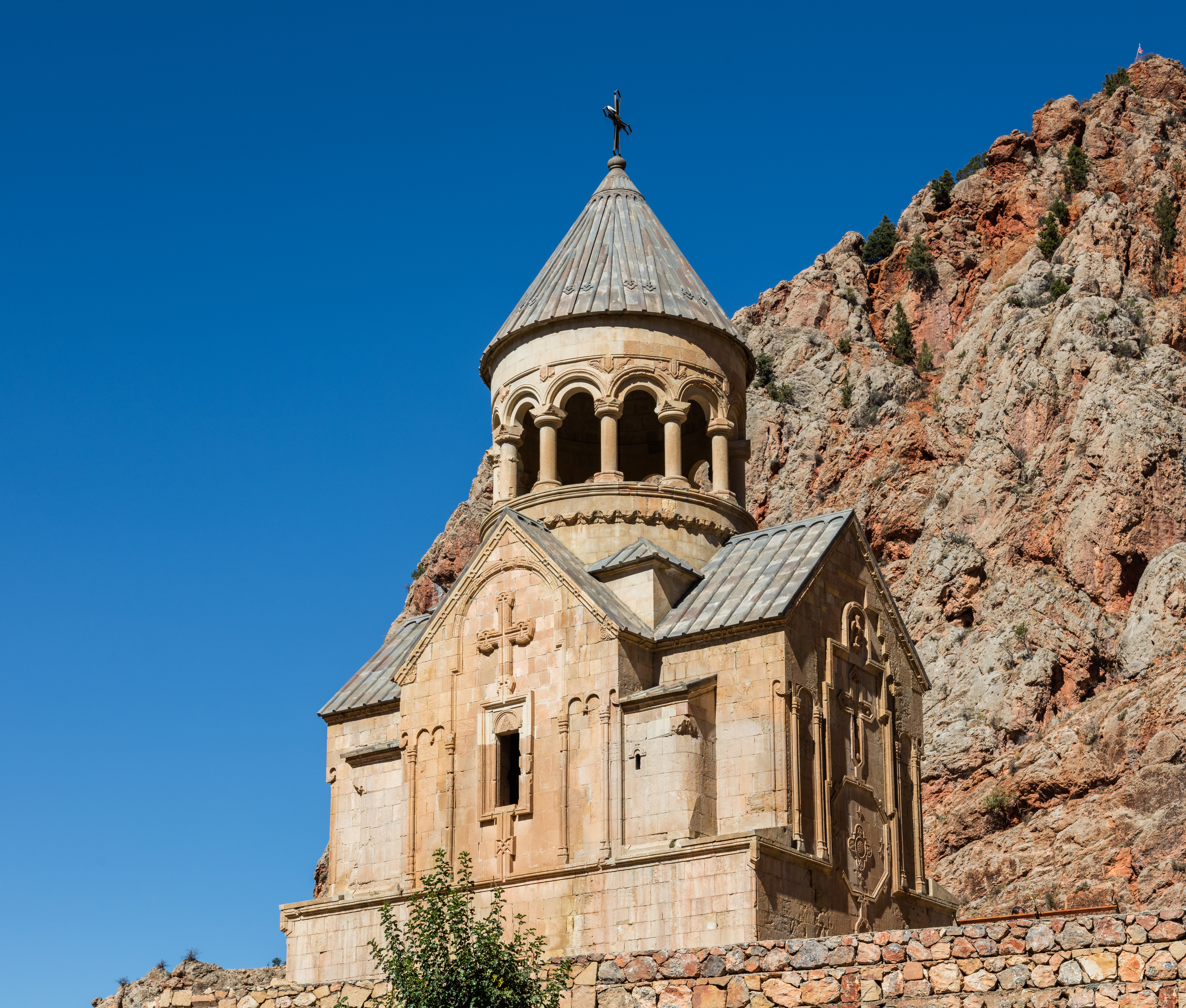
St. Astvatsatsin Church of Noravank
