= Areni Community =

Areni Արենի
- Rural Community
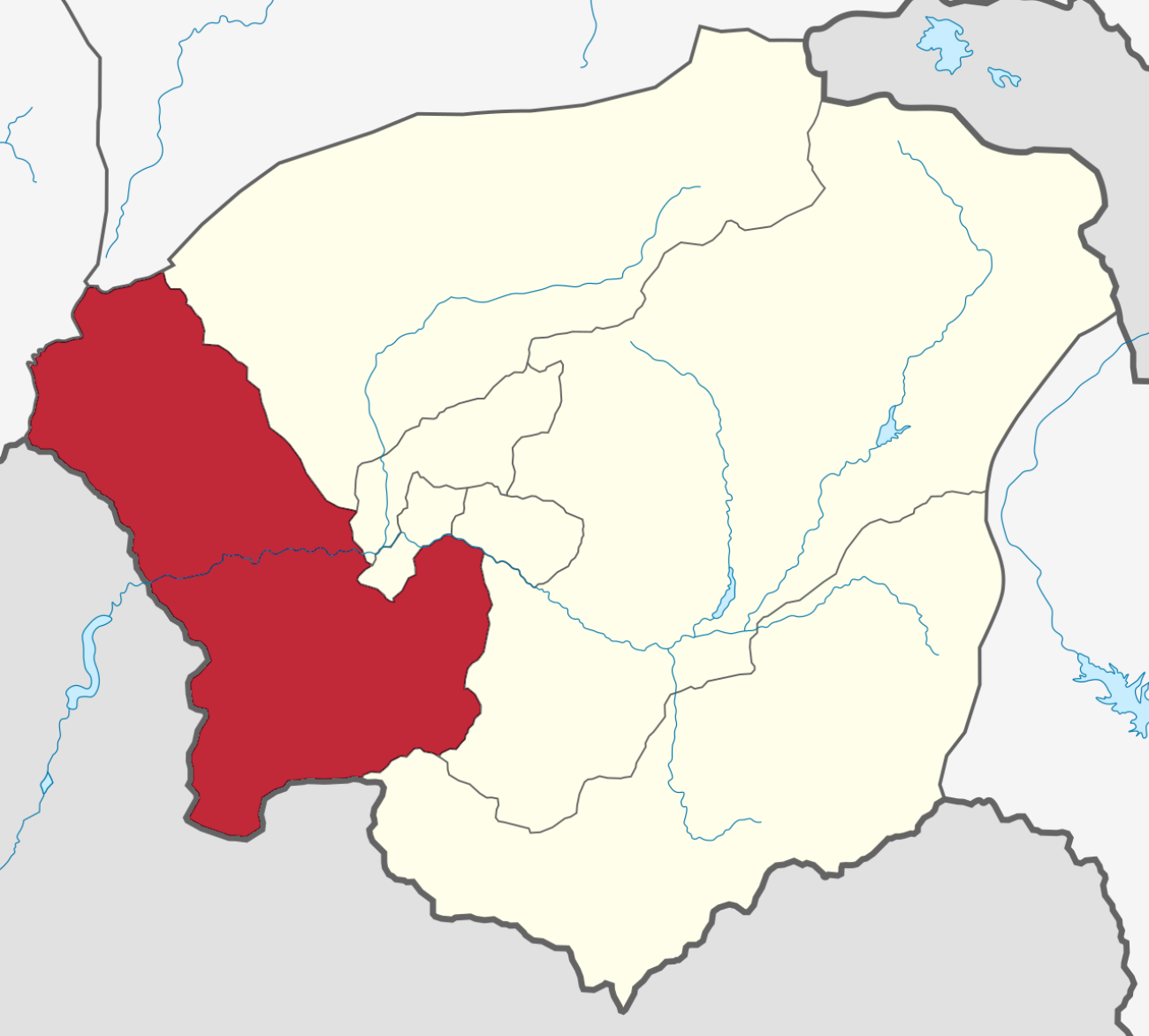
- Coordinates: 39°45′N 45°10′E
- Country: Armenia
- Province: Vayots Dzor
- Formed: 9 June 2017
- Administrative centre: Areni

Government
  - Mayor: Husik Sahakyan

Area
  - Total: 438 km^{2} (169 sq mi)

Population (2011 census)
  - Total: 10,410
  - Density: 23.8/km^{2} (61.6/sq mi)
- Time zone: AMT (UTC+04)
- Postal code: 3601–3810
- ISO 3166 code: AM-VD
- FIPS 10-4: AM10

Areni Municipality, referred to as Areni Community (Armenian: Արենի Համայնք Areni Hamaynk), is a rural community and administrative subdivision of Vayots Dzor Province of Armenia, at the southeast of the country. Consisted of a group of settlements, its administrative centre is the village of Areni.

== Included settlements ==
Settlement	Type	Population (2018 census)
Areni	Village, administrative centre	1,968
Agarakadzor	Village	1,432
Aghavnadzor	Village	1,978
Arpi	Village	1,167
Chiva	Village	823
Gnishik	Village	66
Khachik	Village	926
Mozrov	Village	281
Rind	Village	1,502
Yelpin	Village	1,128
Amaghu	Abandoned village	0

== Politics ==
Areni Municipal Assembly (Armenian: Արենիի համայնքապետարան, Areni hamaynqapetaran) is the representative body in Kajaran Municipality, consisting of 15 members which are elected every five years. The last election was held in September 2022. Husik Sahakyan of Civil Contract party was elected mayor.

Party	2022	Current Municipal Assembly
**Civil Contract**	**13**	
Hanrapetutyun Party	**2**	
Total	15	

Ruling coalition or party marked in bold.
