= Khachik, Armenia =

Khachik Խաչիկ
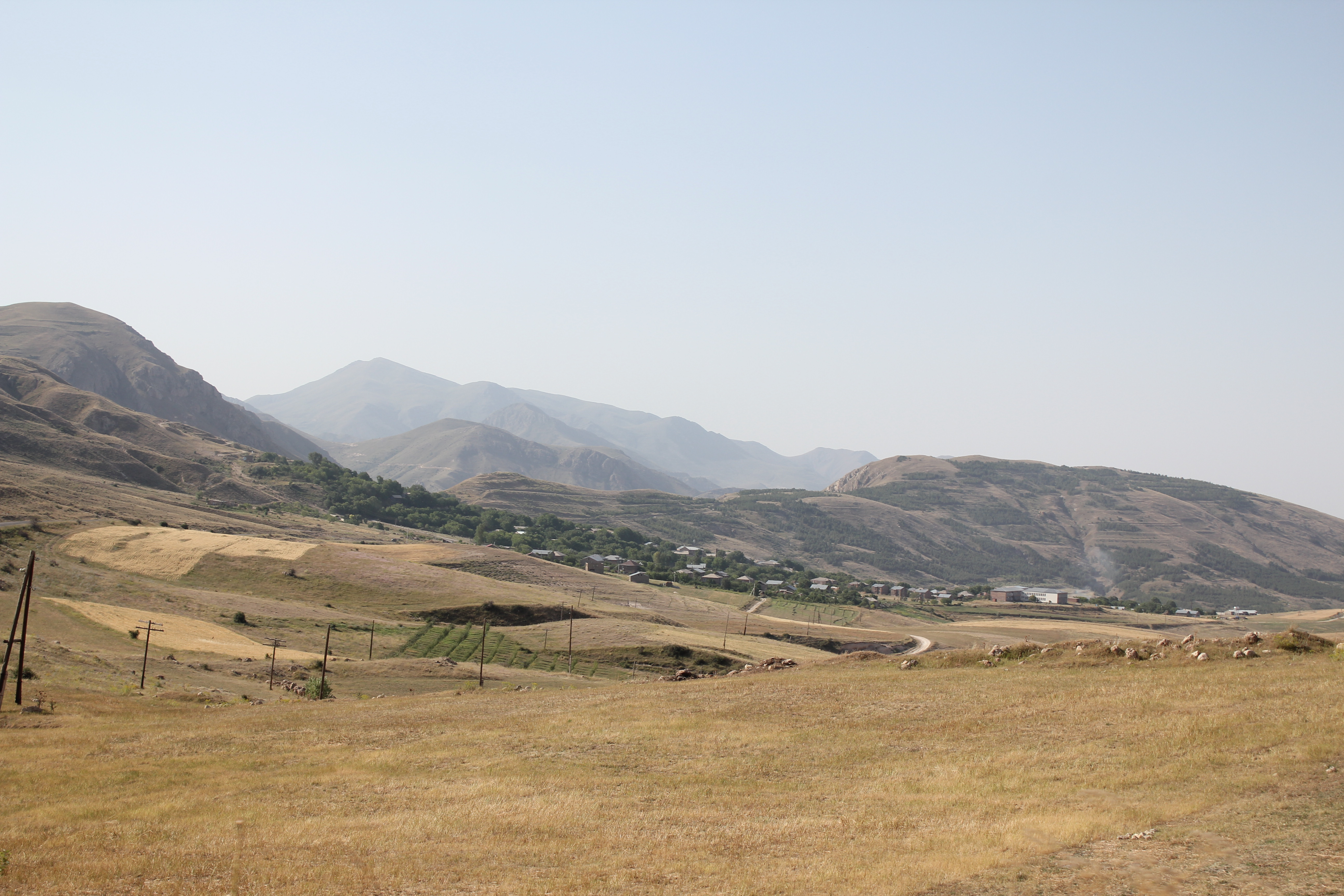

- Location within Armenia Location within Vayots Dzor
- Coordinates: 39°37′18″N 45°12′20″E
- Country: Armenia
- Province: Vayots Dzor
- Municipality: Areni

Population (2011)
  - Total: 862
- Time zone: UTC+4 (AMT)

Khachik (Armenian: Խաչիկ) is a village in the Areni Municipality of the Vayots Dzor Province in Armenia, located on the Armenia–Azerbaijan border. The village is the home to the fourth Infantry unit of Vayk Brigade.

== Gallery ==
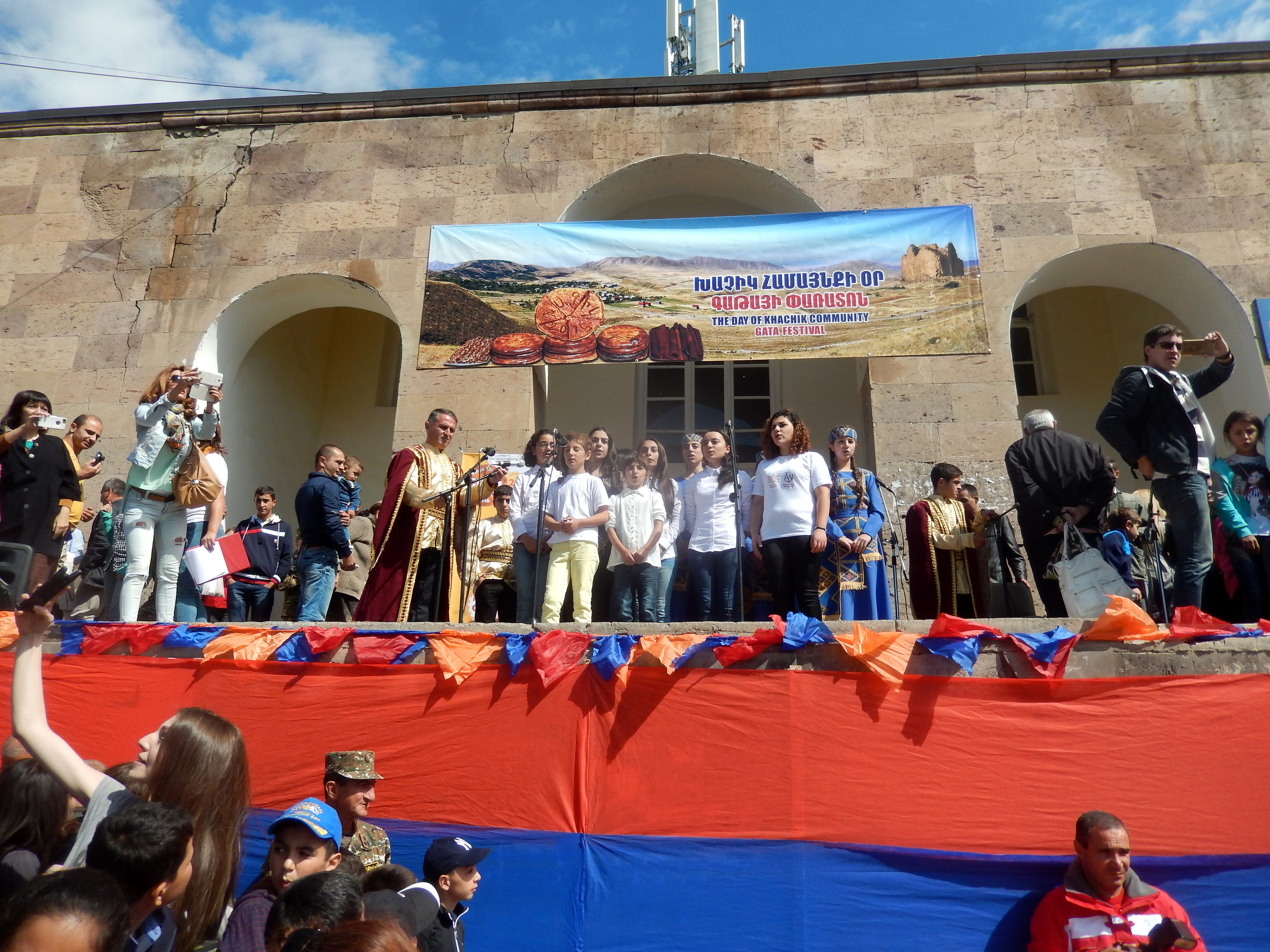
Gata Festival in Khachik

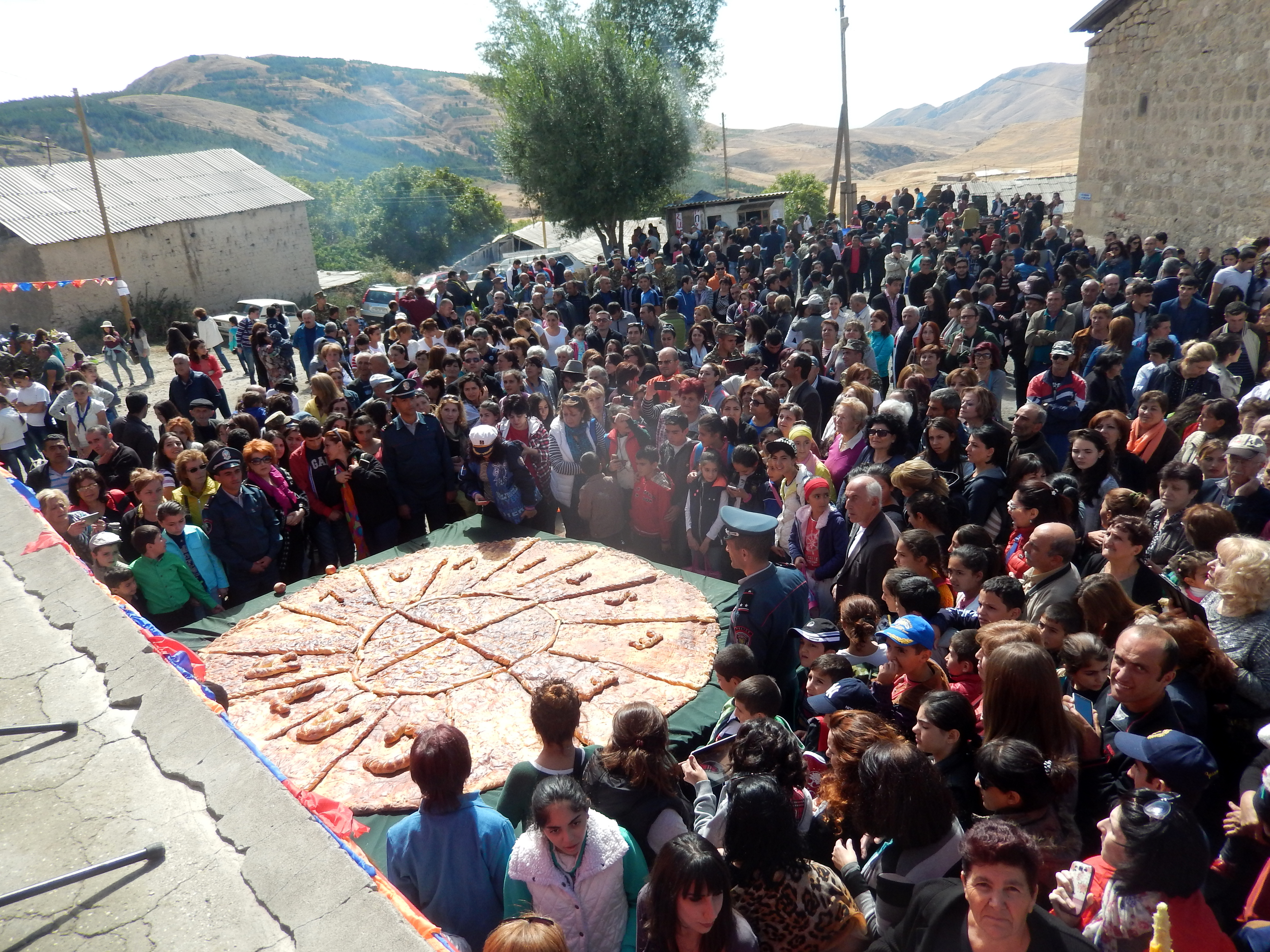
Gata Festival in Khachik

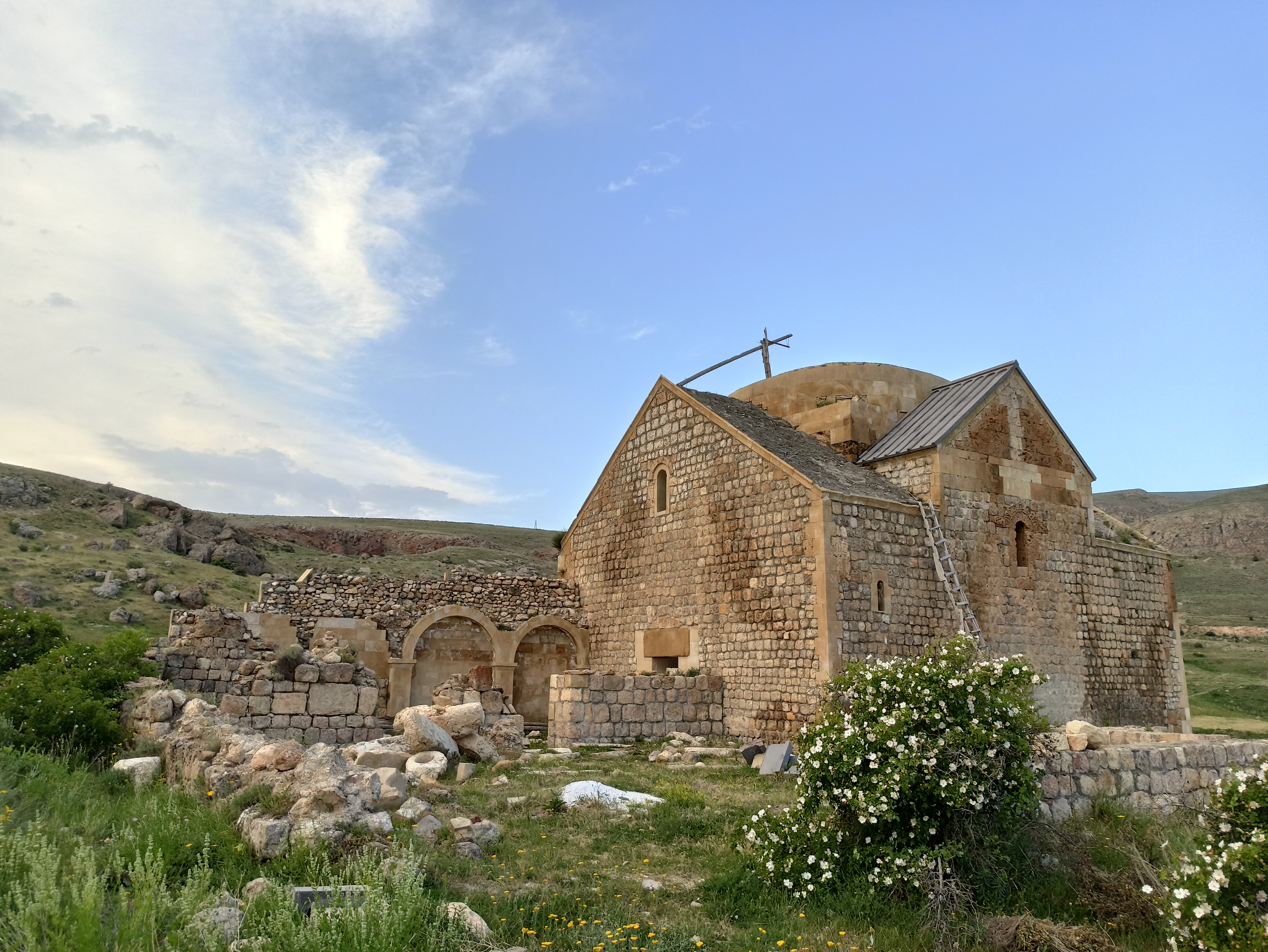
Karakop Monastery

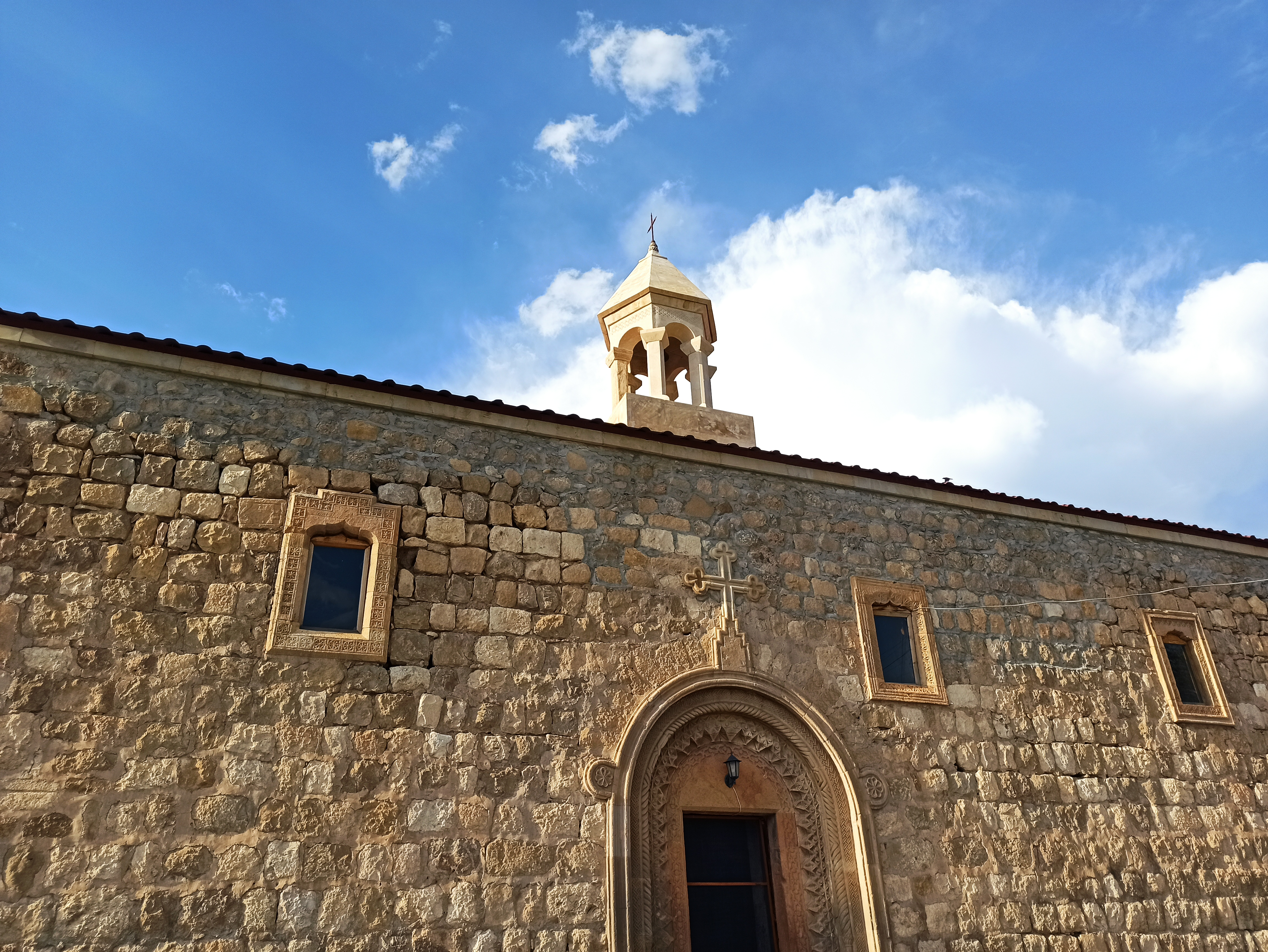
Holy Mother of God Church in Khachik

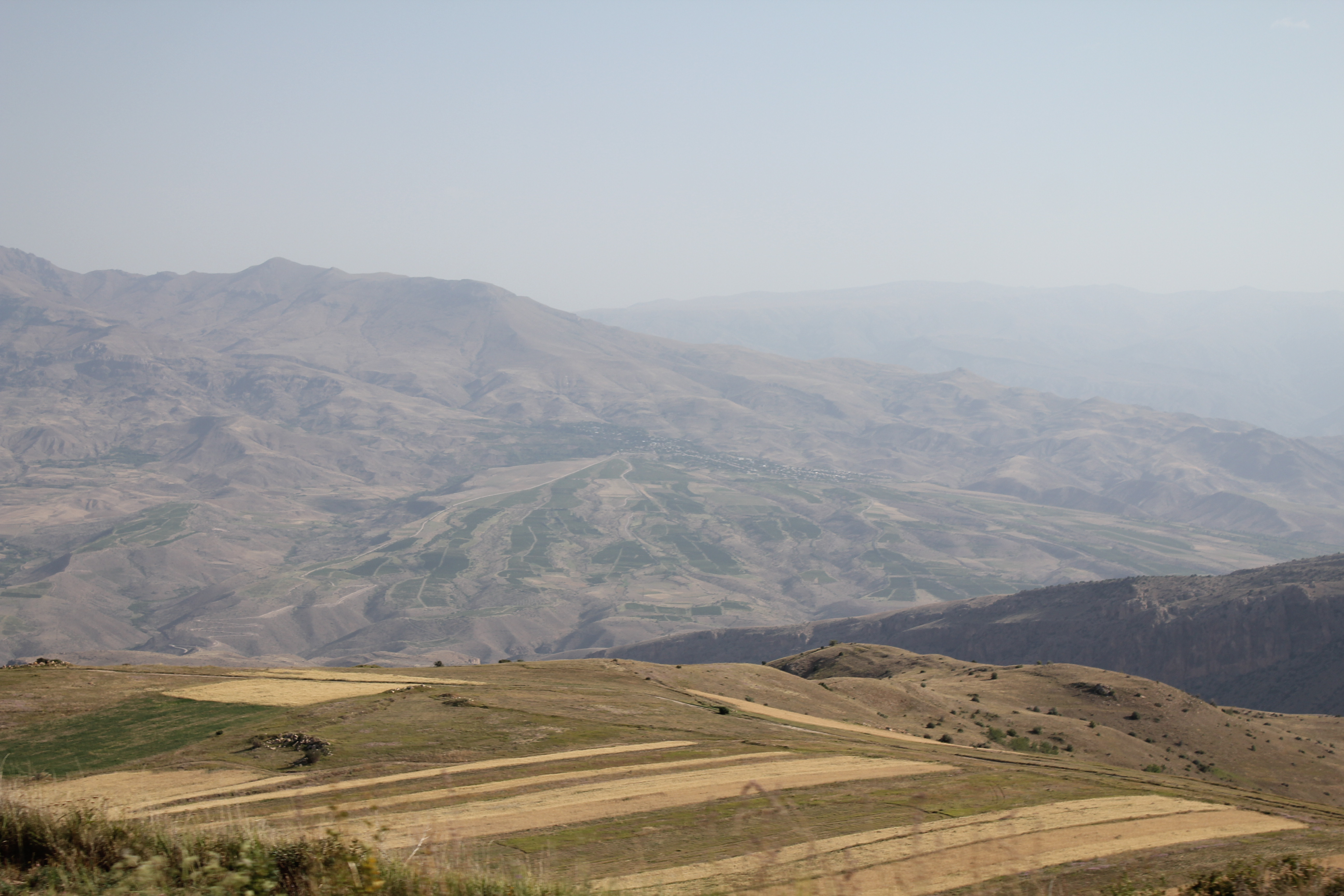
Scenery around Khachik

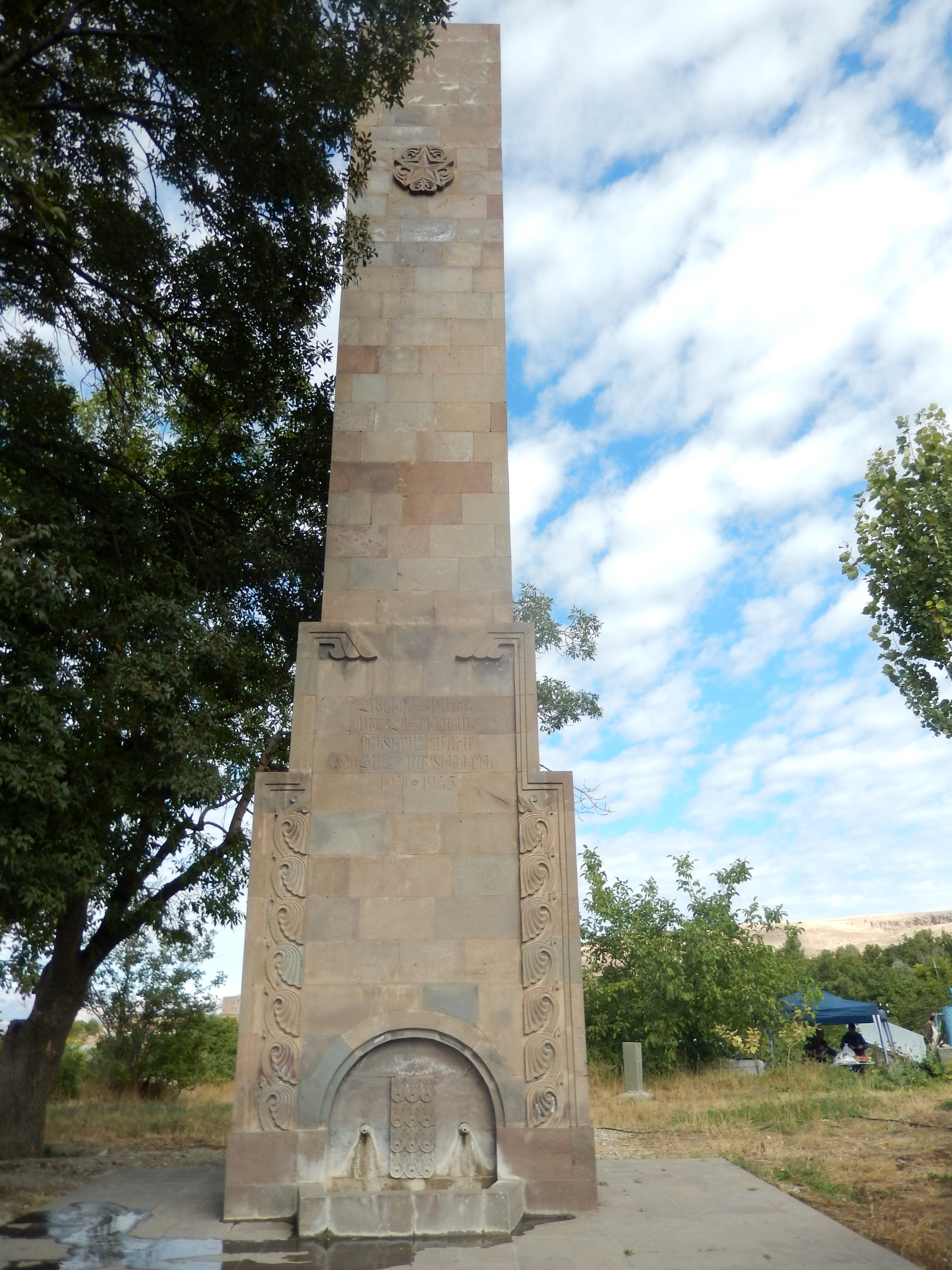
WWII monument

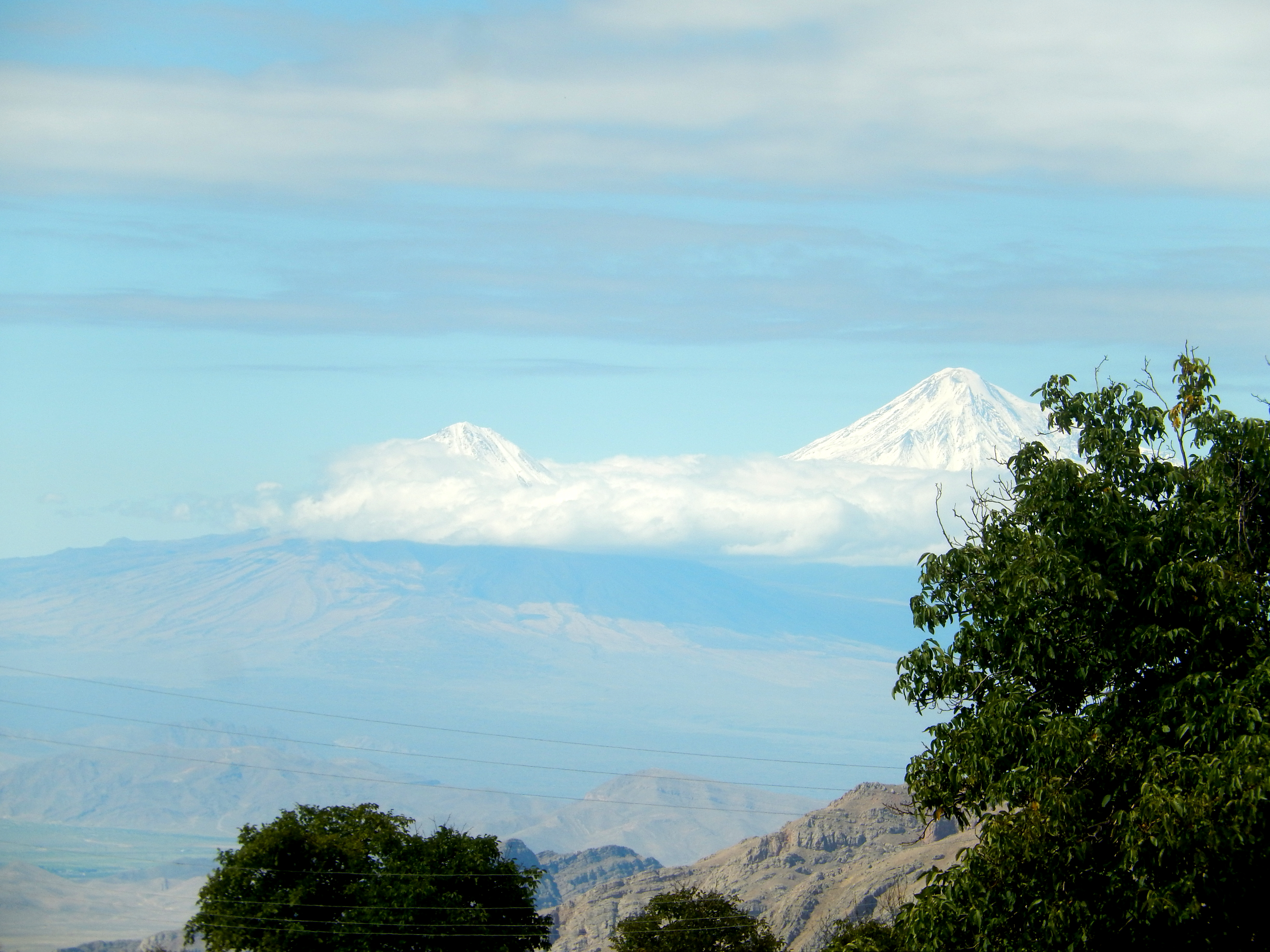
Mount Ararat from Khachik

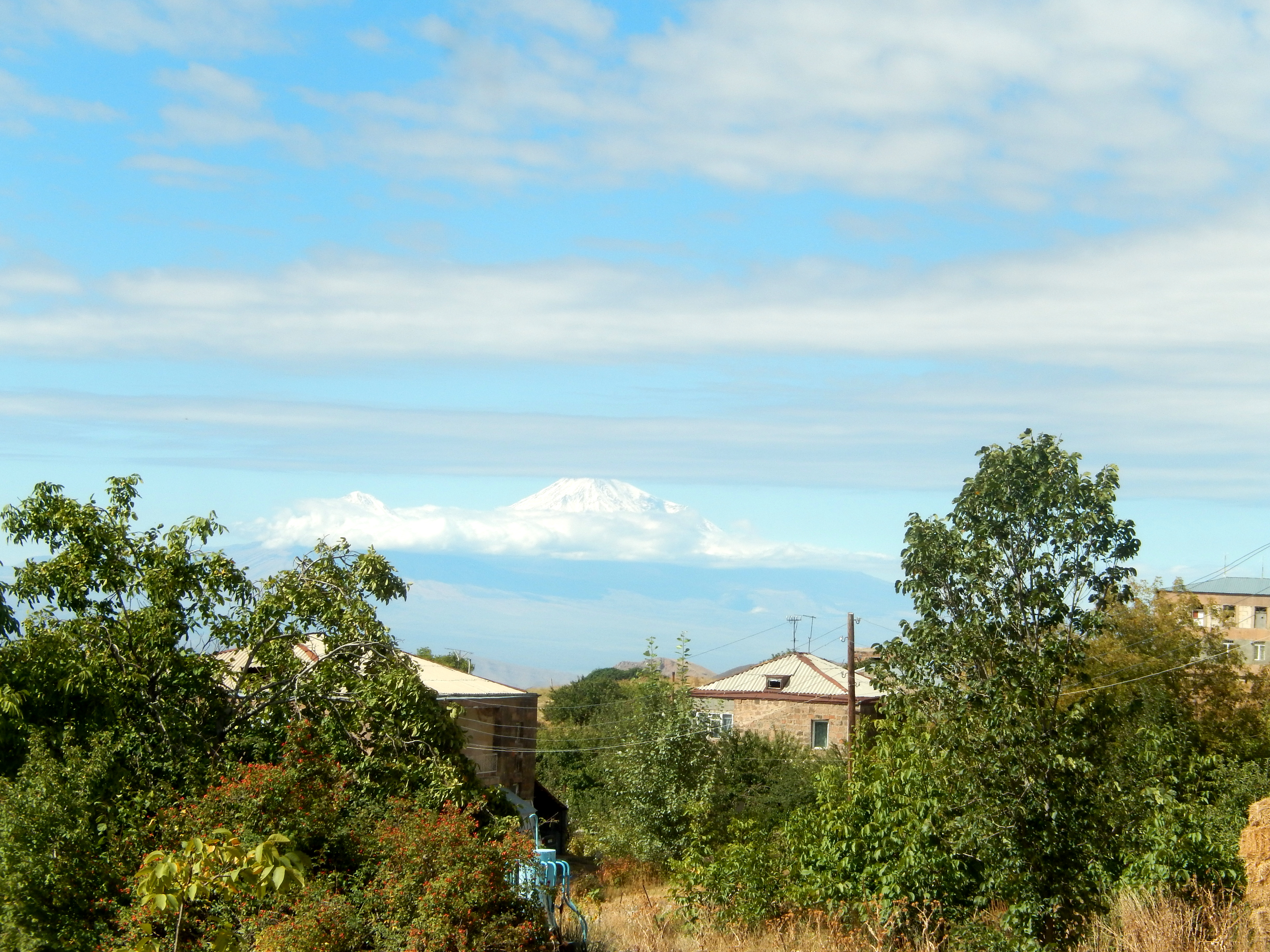
Mount Ararat from Khachik
