= Agarakadzor =

Agarakadzor Ագարակաձոր
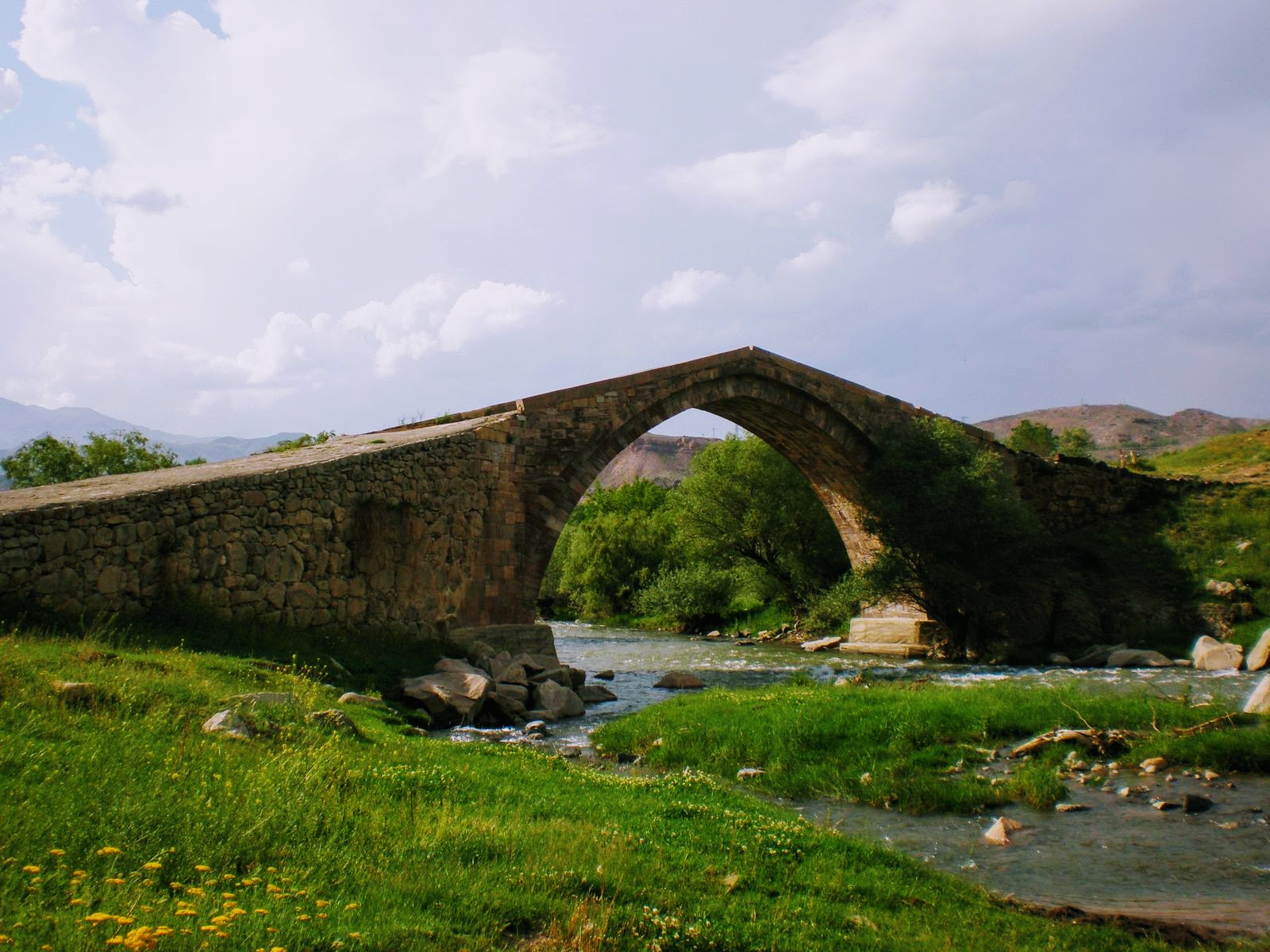
- 13th-century bridge near Agarakadzor

- Location within Armenia Location within Vayots Dzor
- Coordinates: 39°44′11″N 45°20′44″E
- Country: Armenia
- Province: Vayots Dzor
- Municipality: Areni

Population (2011)
  - Total: 1,301
- Time zone: UTC+4 (AMT)

Agarakadzor (Armenian: Ագարակաձոր) is a village in the Areni Municipality of the Vayots Dzor Province in Armenia.

== Toponymy ==
The village was previously known as Ayar.

== Historical heritage sites ==
Two kilometers from the village is a 13th-century bridge that once served as the main route to Julfa, two kilometers to the east is a 13th-15th century cemetery.

== Gallery ==
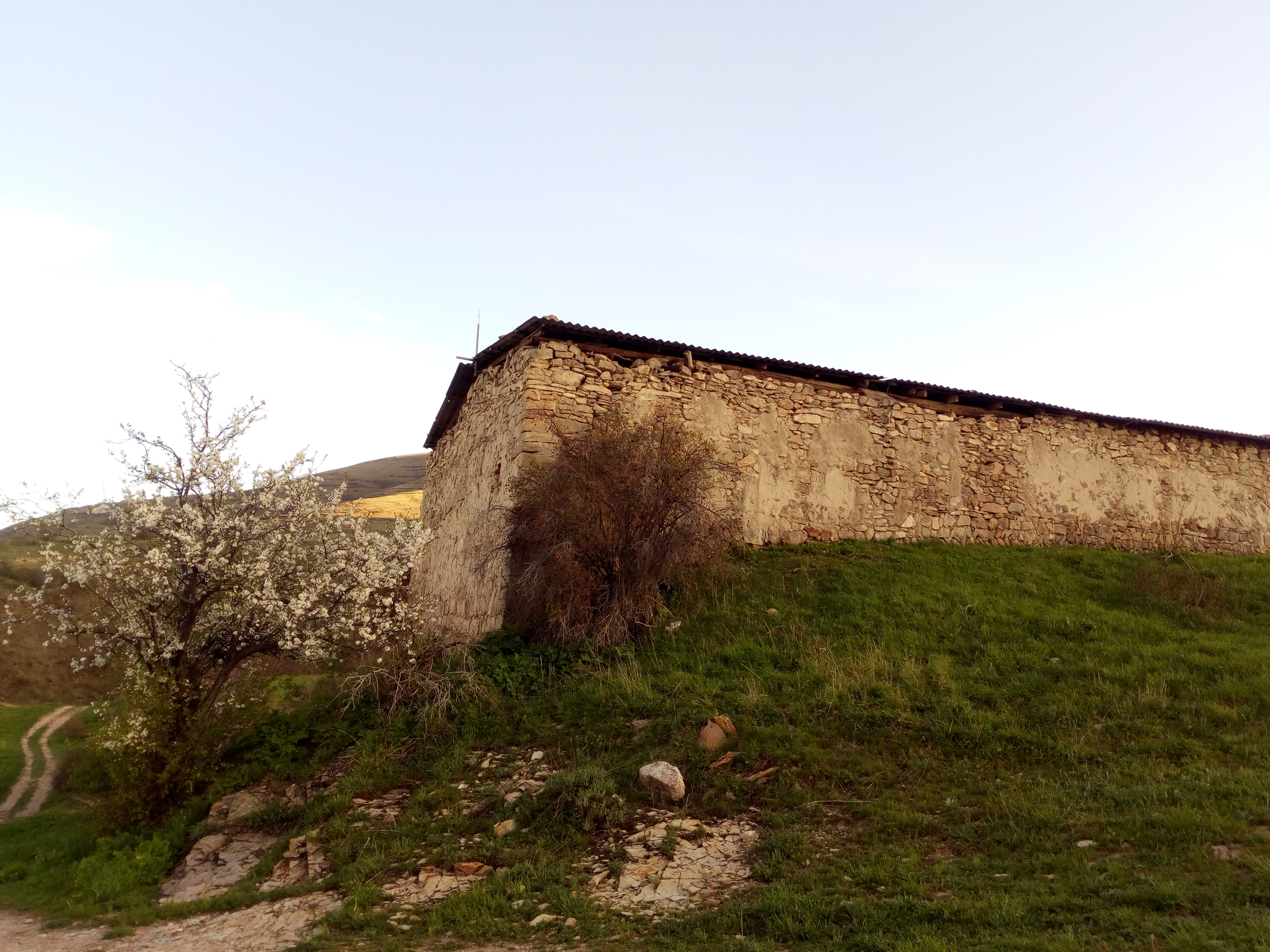
Church in nearby abandoned village of Gandzak

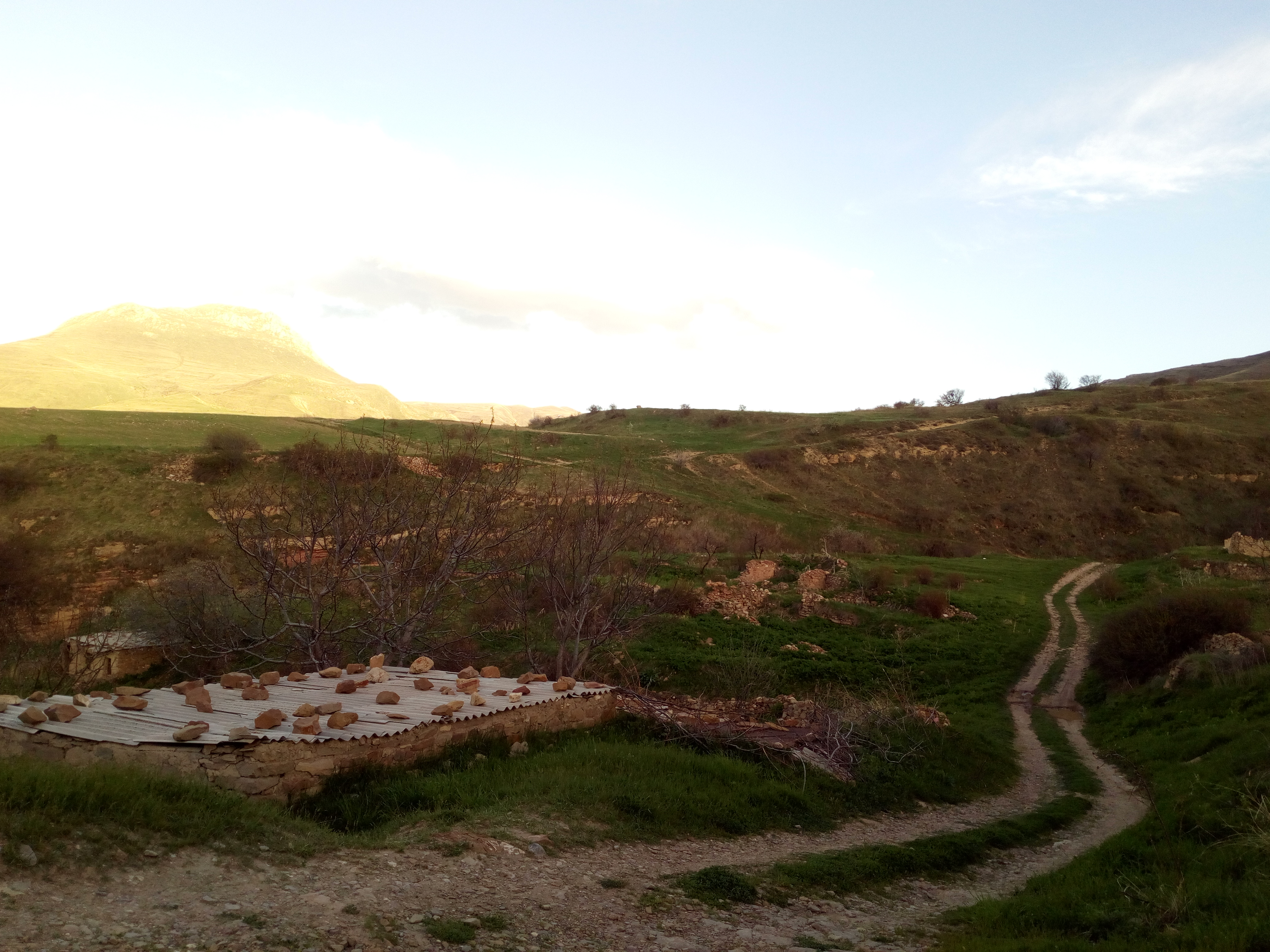
Nearby abandoned village of Gandzak

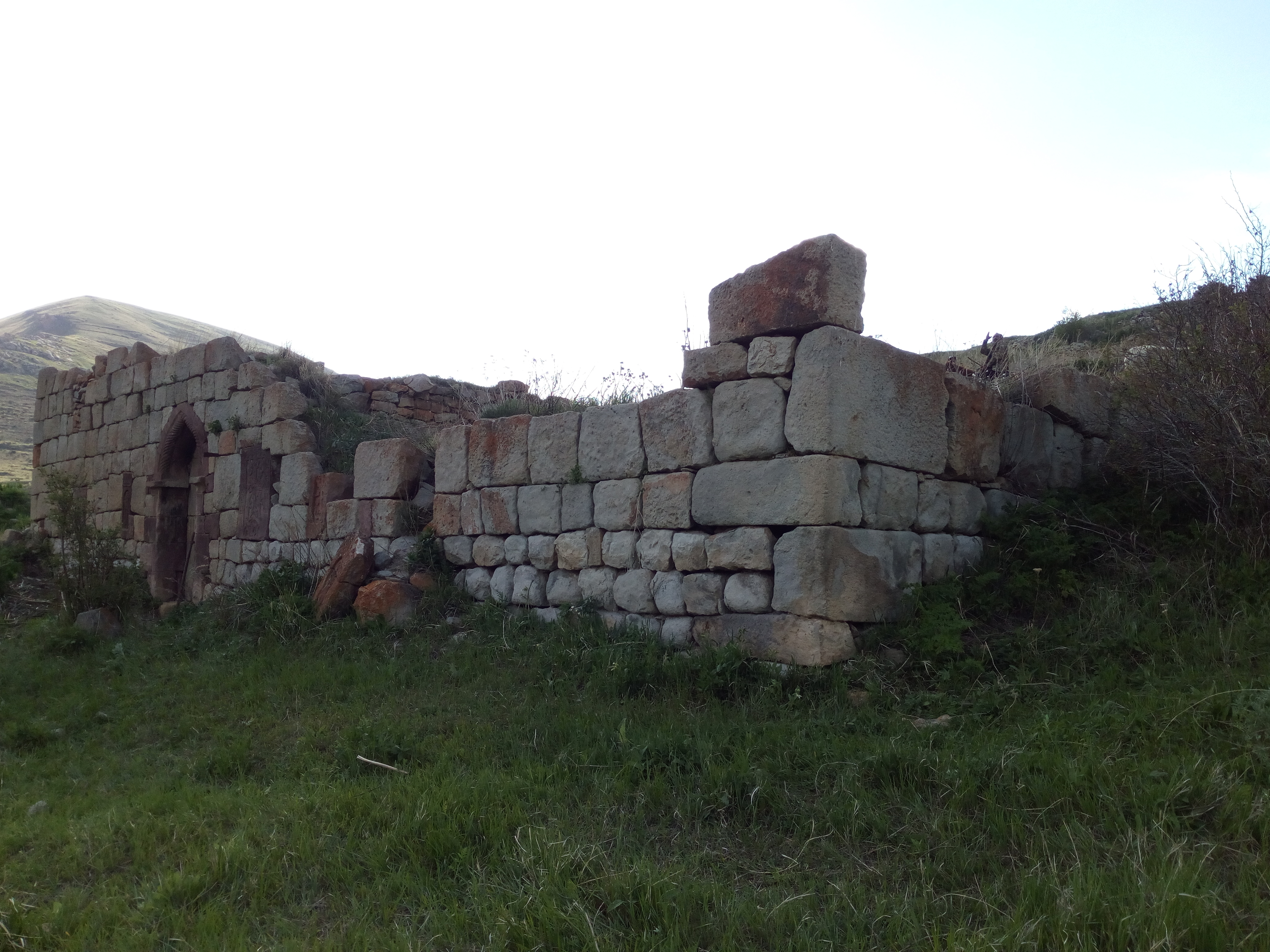
Tukh Manuk Church in nearby abandoned village of Boloraberd

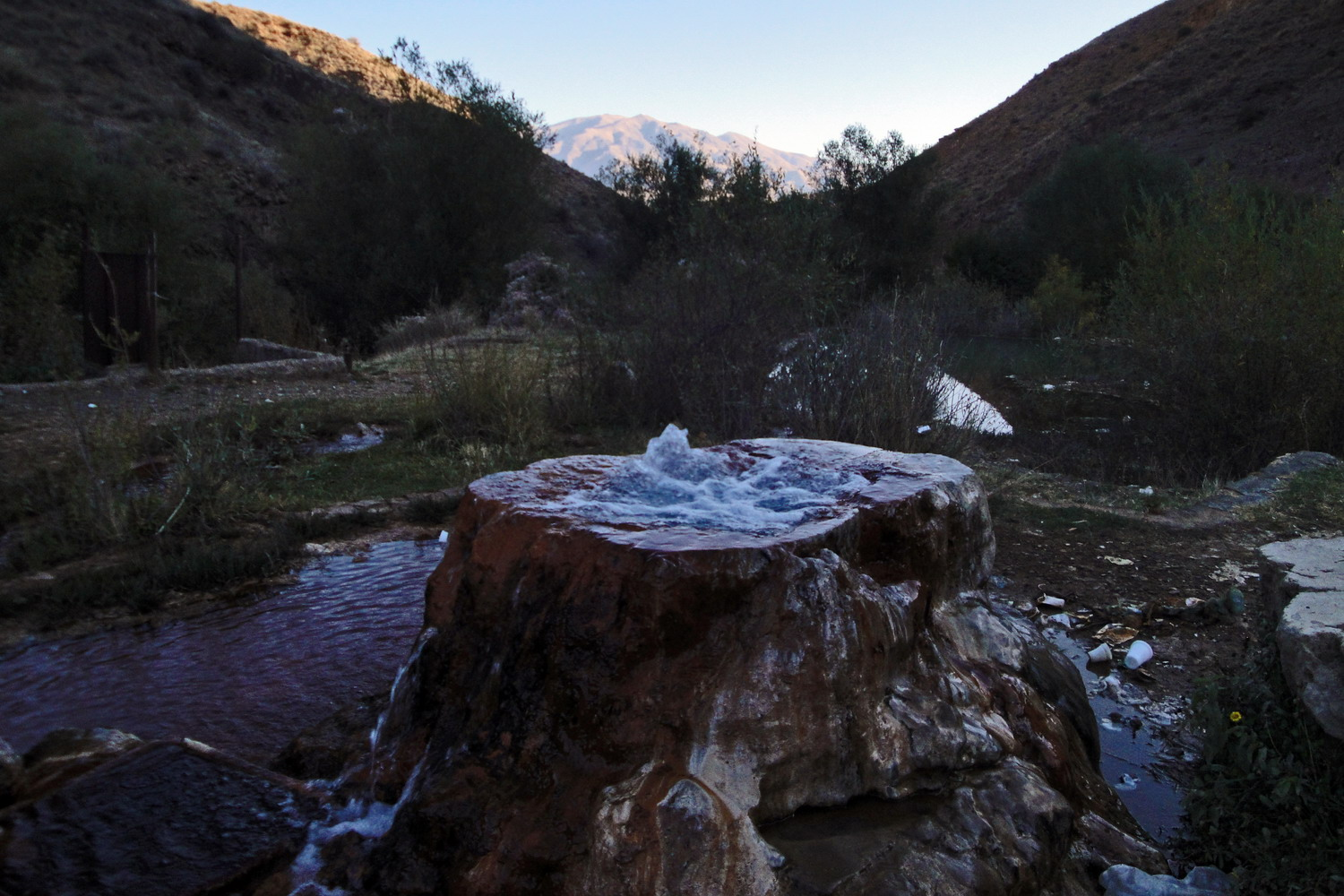
Grav spring in Agarakadzor
