= Chiva, Armenia =

Chiva Չիվա
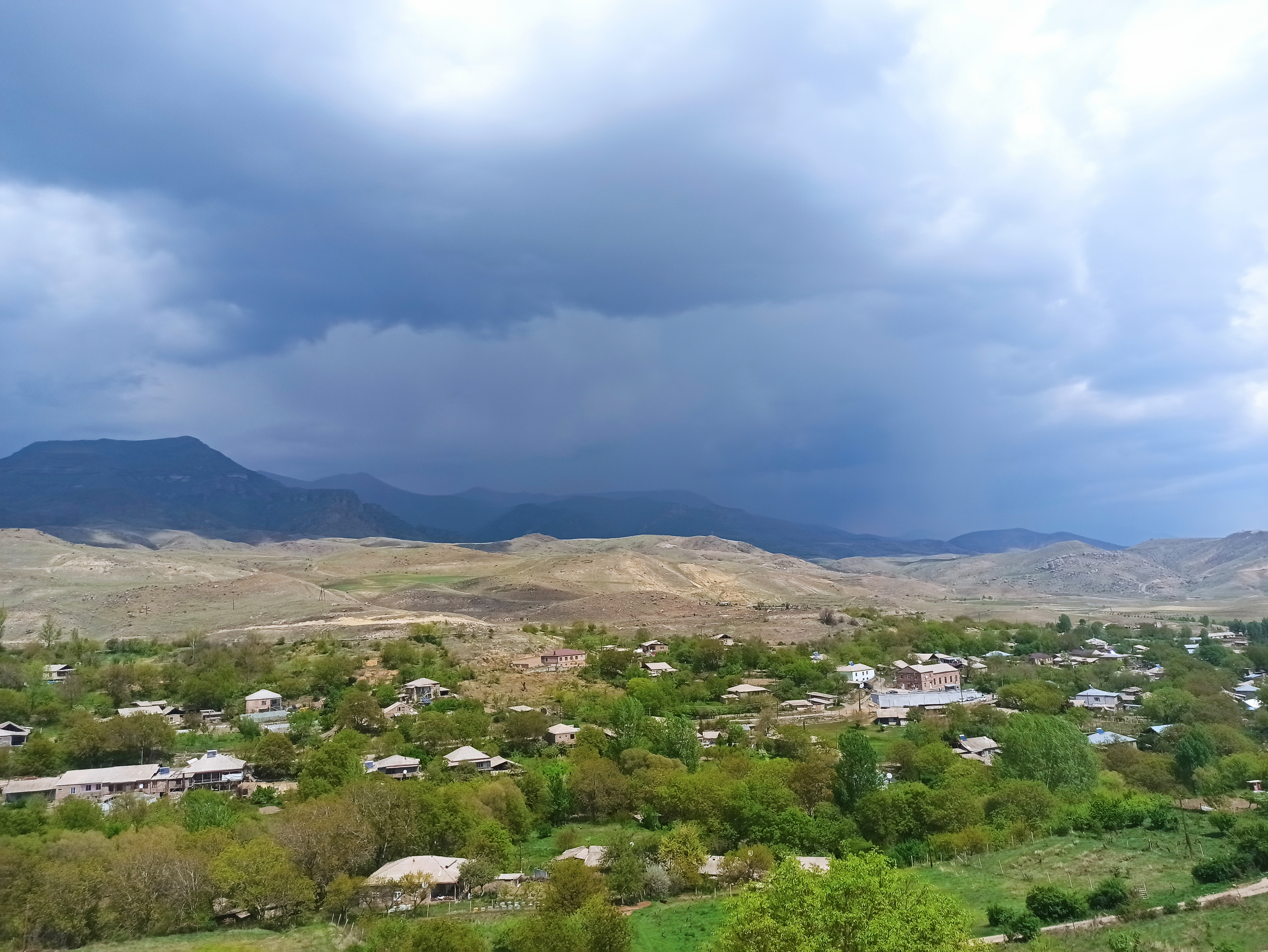

- Location within Armenia Location within Vayots Dzor
- Coordinates: 39°46′02″N 45°08′27″E
- Country: Armenia
- Province: Vayots Dzor
- Municipality: Areni

Population (2011)
  - Total: 698
- Time zone: UTC+4 (AMT)

Chiva (Armenian: Չիվա) is a village in the Areni Municipality of the Vayots Dzor Province in Armenia. The village is located 20 km west of the province center, on the right and left banks of the Yelpin River.

== Toponymy ==
The village is also known as Chivagyugh.

== Historical heritage sites ==
There is a 10th-century church in the village.

== Demographics ==
The population dynamics of Chiva over the years:

| Year | 1831 | 1873 | 1897 | 1926 | 1939 | 1959 | 1970 | 1979 | 1989 | 2001 | 2011 |
| Population | 52 | 294 | 689 | 461 | 758 | 669 | 910 | 933 | 755 | 892 | 698 |

== Economy and culture ==
The population is engaged in viticulture, cultivation of grain, tobacco, and vegetable crops.
