= Mozrov =

Mozrov Մոզրով
- Location within Armenia Location within Vayots Dzor
- Coordinates: 39°42′03″N 45°20′25″E
- Country: Armenia
- Province: Vayots Dzor
- Municipality: Areni

Population (2011)
  - Total: 88
- Time zone: UTC+4 (AMT)

Mozrov (Armenian: Մոզրով) is a village in the Areni Municipality of the Vayots Dzor Province in Armenia. The village has many ancient caves. The National Competitiveness Foundation of Armenia has plans to turn the cave into a major tourist attraction with cafes, souvenir shops, and trails within the cave to guide tourists.

== Gallery ==
Mozrov cave

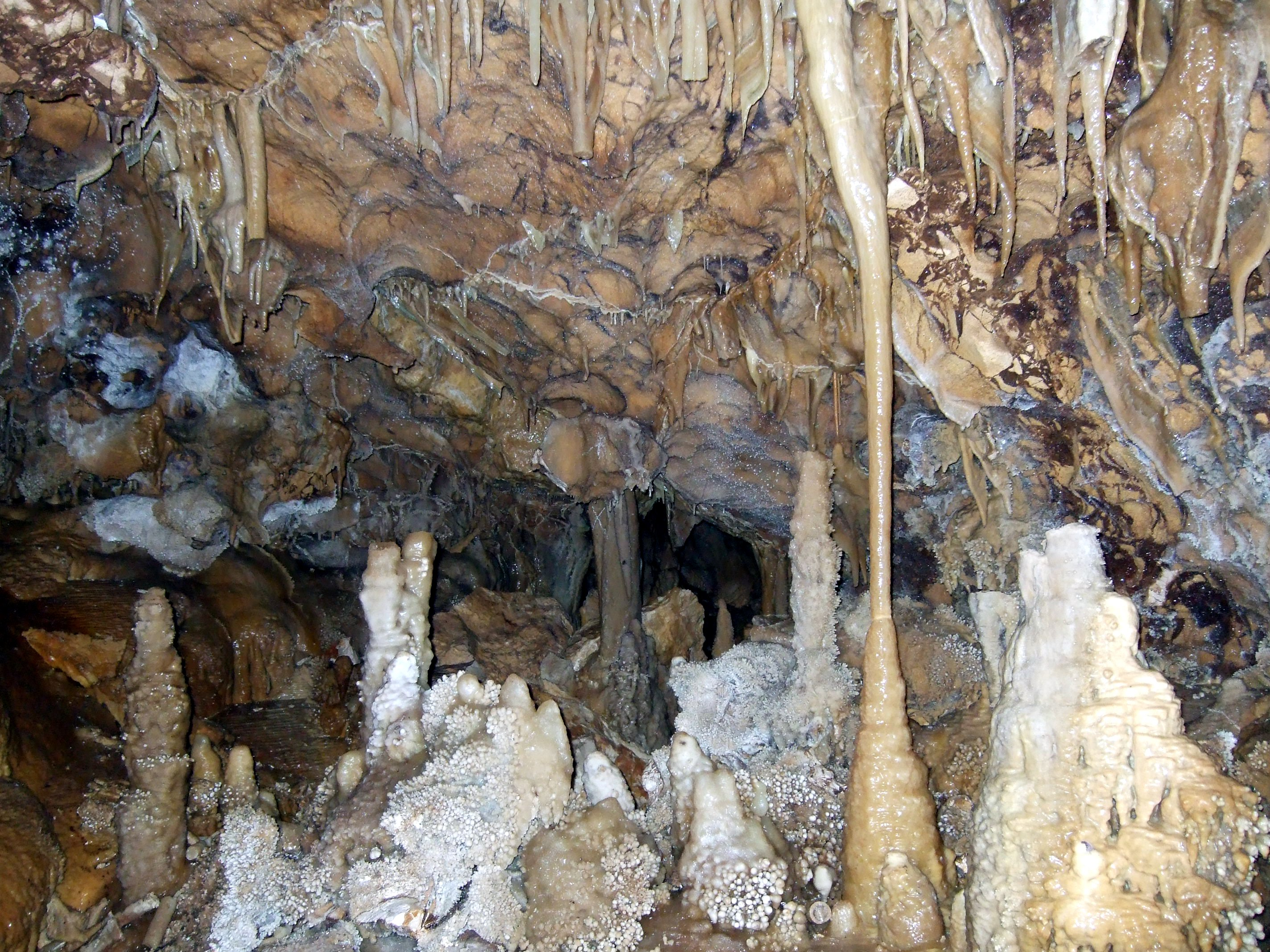

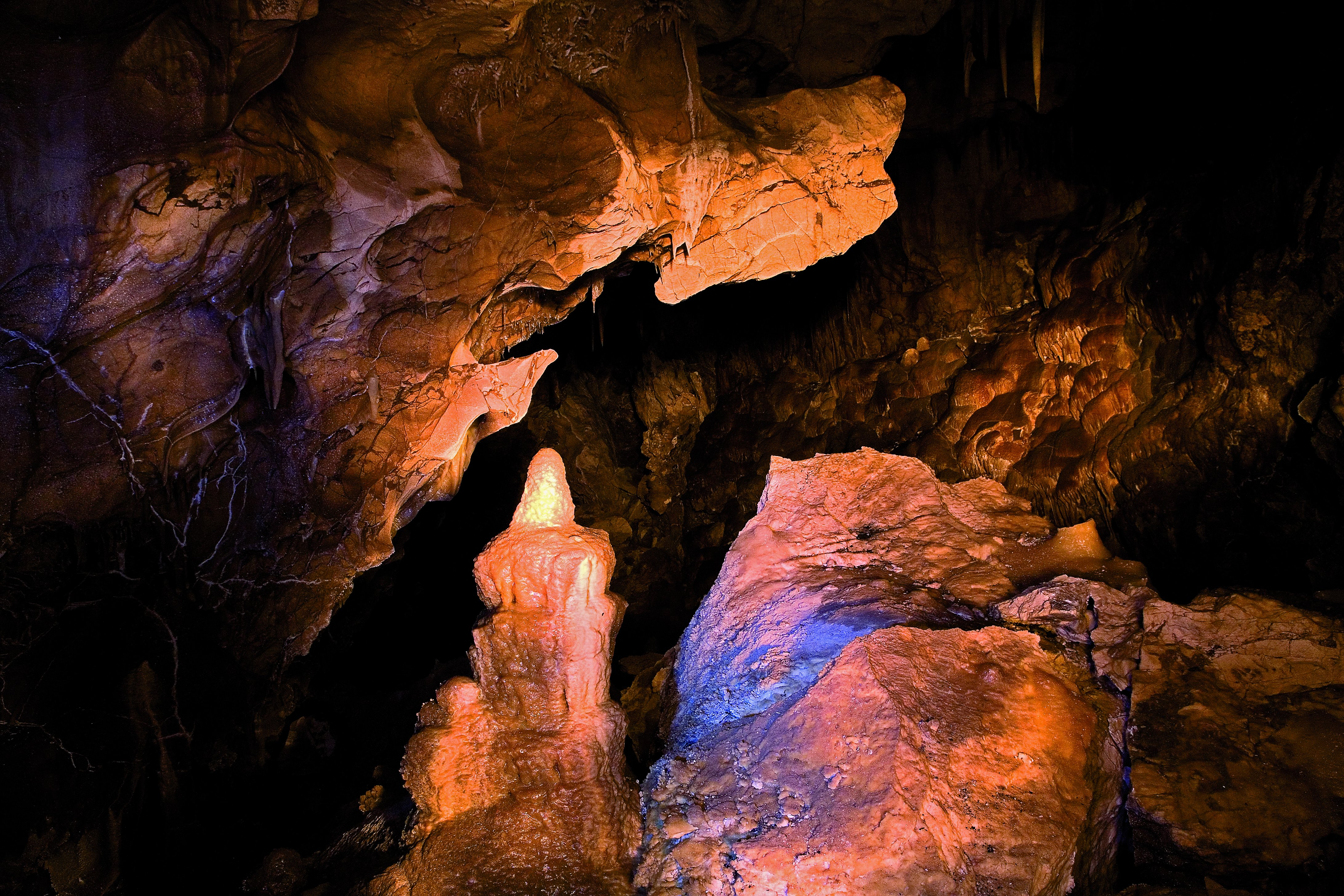

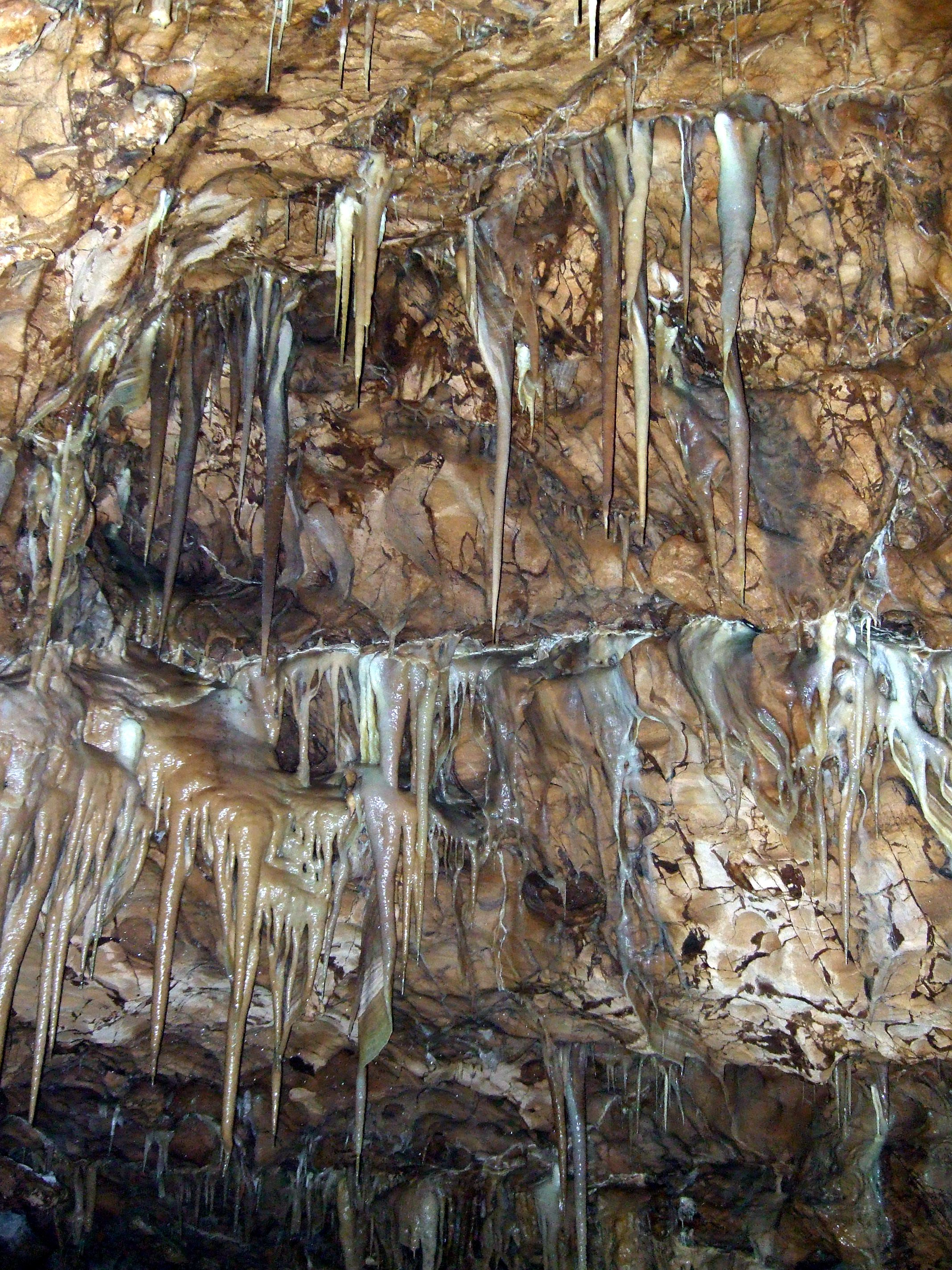

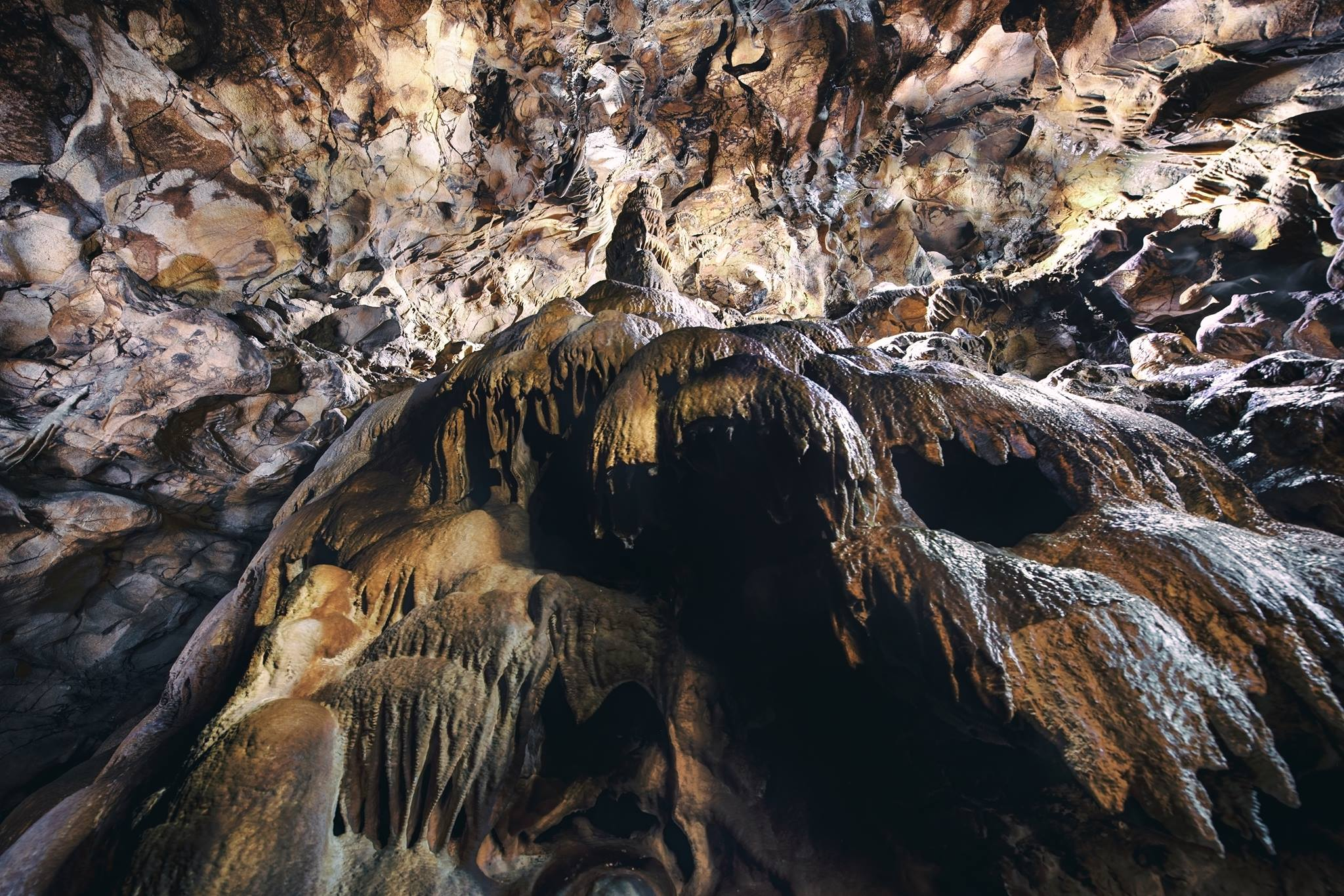

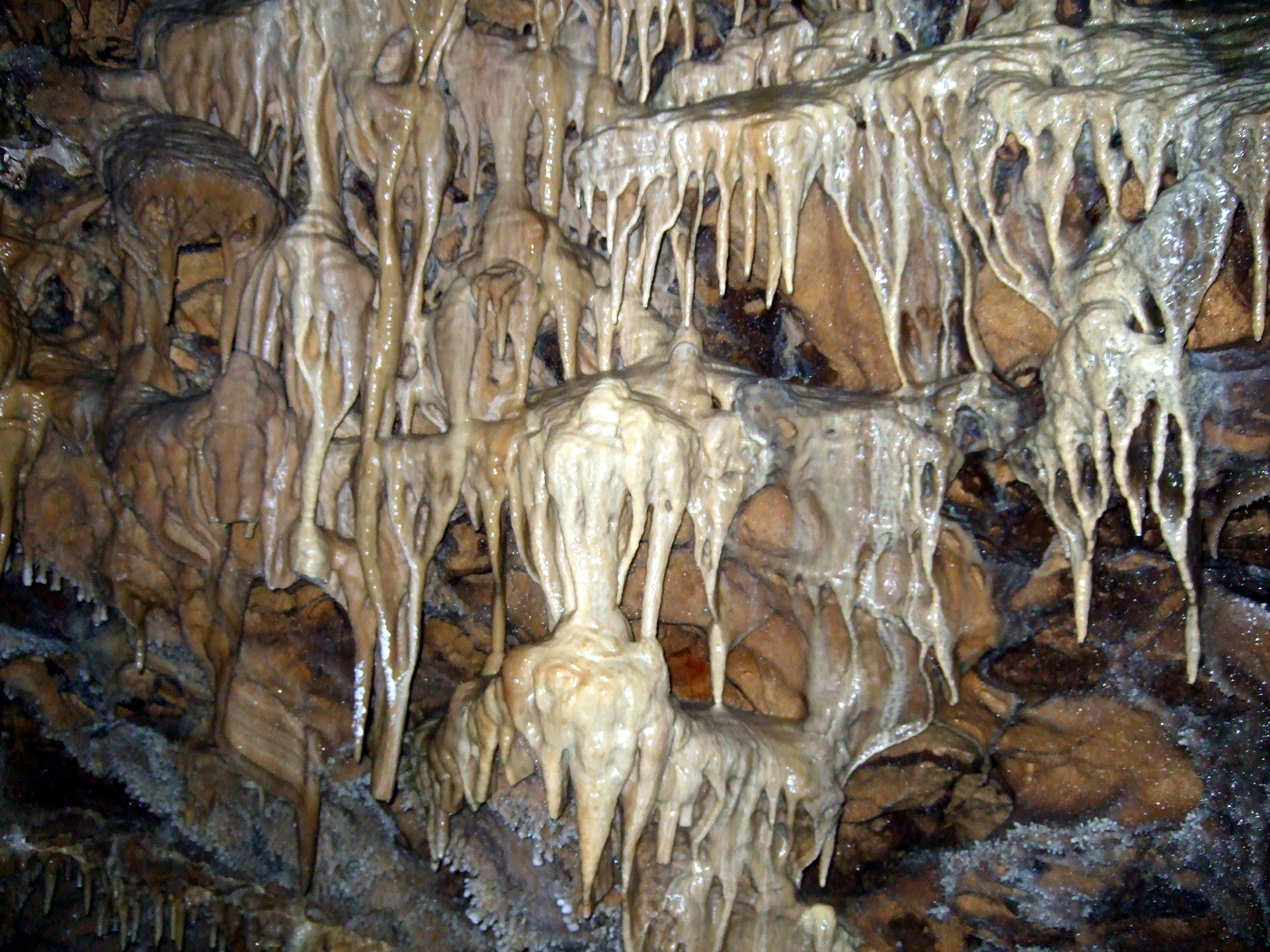

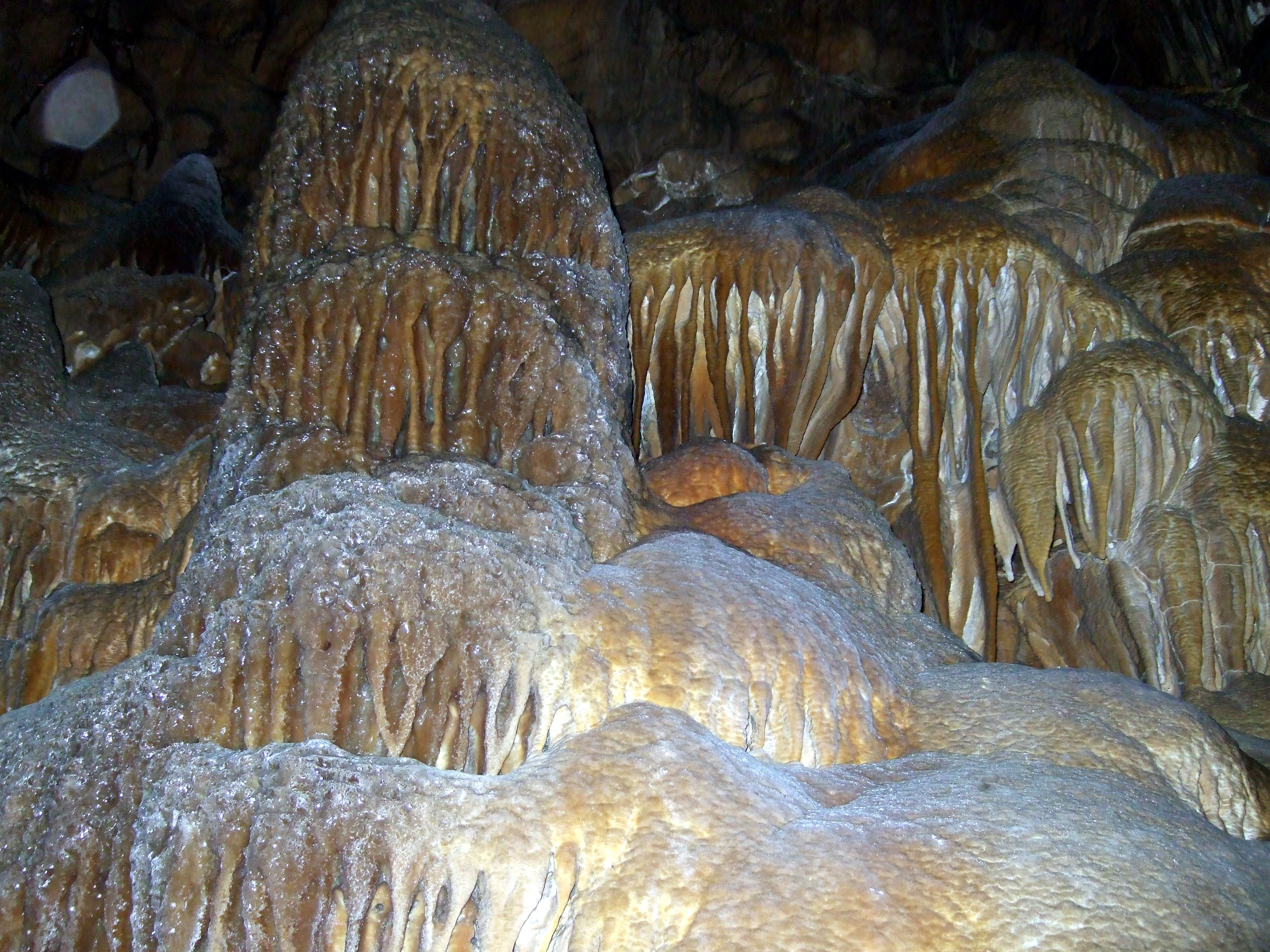
