= Bashkand =

Bashkand, Bashkend, Başkənd or Bash Kand (Persian: باشكند) may refer to:

- Artsvashen, je jure exclave of Armenia, occupied by Azerbaijan which calls it Bashkand/Başkənd
- Bashkand, Bostanabad, East Azerbaijan Province
- Bash Kand, Sarab, East Azerbaijan Province
- Bashkand, West Azerbaijan
- Başkənd, Kalbajar, Azerbaijan
- Başkənd, Khojali, Azerbaijan
- Başkənd, Nakhchivan, Azerbaijan
- Gegharkunik, Gegharkunik, Armenia, formerly Bashkend
- Vernashen, Armenia, formerly Bashkend

== See also ==
- Başköy (disambiguation)
