= Diocese of Vayots Dzor =

Diocese of Vayots Dzor Վայոց Ձորի թեմ
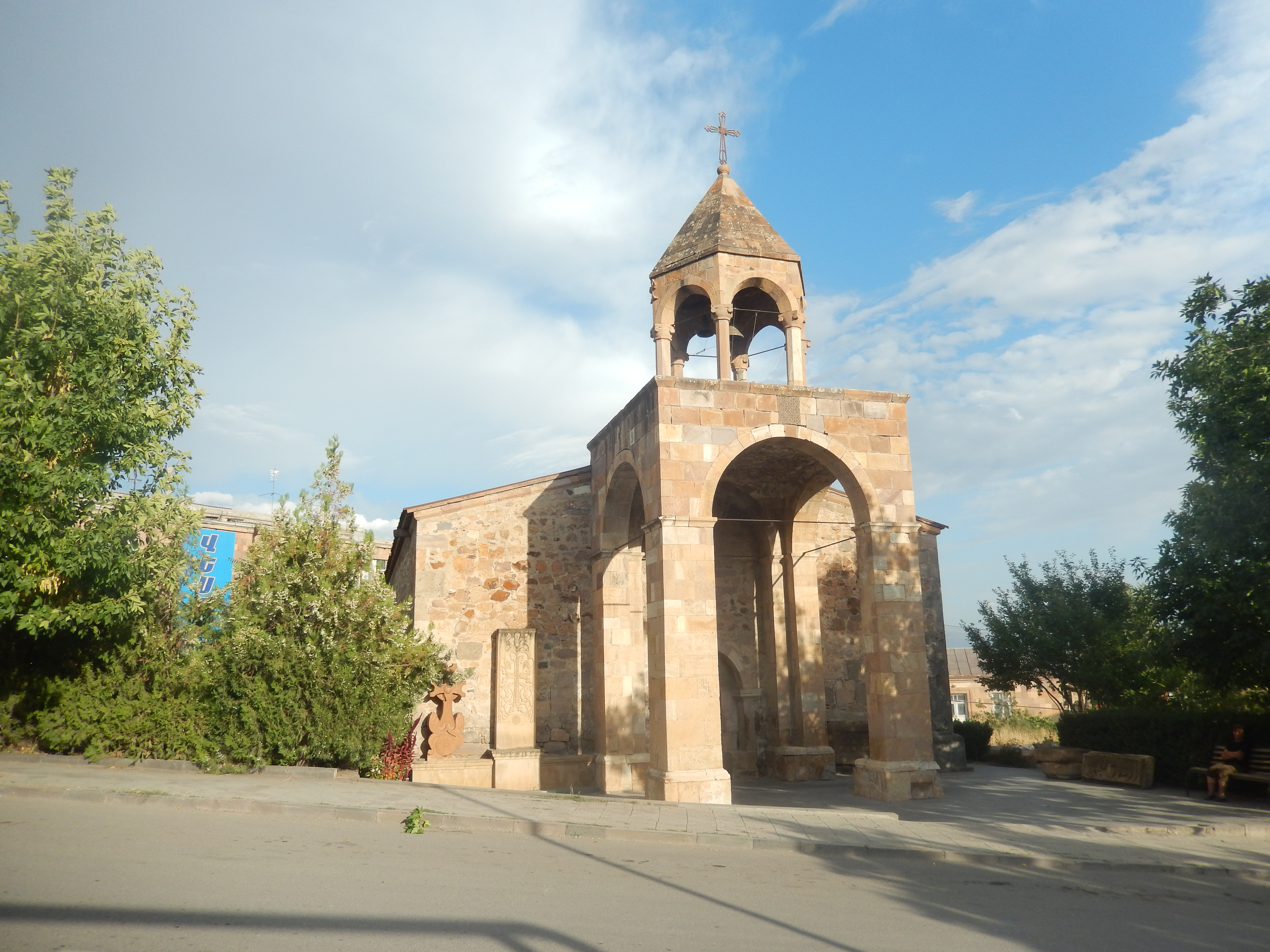
- Holy Mother of God Cathedral

Location
- Country: Armenia
- Territory: Vayots Dzor Province

Statistics
- Population: Total: (as of 2011); ~50,000
- Churches: 15

Information
- Denomination: Armenian Apostolic Church
- Rite: Armenian Rite
- Established: 10 December 2010
- Cathedral: Holy Mother of God Cathedral, Yeghegnadzor
- Secular priests: 6

Current leadership
- Patriarch: Karekin II
- Primate: Archbishop Abraham Mkrtchyan

Website
- Official web

Diocese of Vayots Dzor (Armenian: Վայոց Ձորի թեմ Vayots Dzori t'em), is one of the newest dioceses of the Armenian Apostolic Church covering the Vayots Dzor Province of Armenia. The diocesan headquarters are located in the town of Yeghegnadzor. The seat of the bishop is the 12th-century Holy Mother of God Cathedral of Yeghegnadzor.

The diocese was established in 2010, when it was separated from the Diocese of Syunik. The prelacy building is located on the Grigor Narekatsi Street in the town of Yeghagndzor.

== Structure ==
The primate of the diocese is archbishop Abraham Mkrtchyan who is in service since the formation of the diocese in December 2010. The vicar is archimandrite Zareh Kabaghyan, while the remaining 5 priests are serving the 17 acting places of worship within the Vayots Dzor Province.

The diocese has the following departments:

- Administration
- Media
- Christian education centre
- Youth union
- Creativity group

== Active churches ==
Here is the list of churches (10), monasteries (5) and chapels (2) functioning under the jurisdiction of the Diocese of Vayots Dzor, along with their location and year of consecration:

=== Churches ===
- Holy Mother of God Cathedral, Yeghnadzor, 12th century
- Holy Mother of God Church, Areni, 1321
- Zorats Surp Stepanos Church, Yeghegis, 14th century
- Holy Mother of God Church, Khachik, 1681
- Holy Mother of God Church, Martiros, 1866
- Surp Hakob Church, Vernashen, 19th century
- Saint Trdat Church, Vayk, 2000
- Saint Anne Church, Malishka, 2000
- Saint Mariam Church, Aghavnadzor, 2001
- Saint Gayane Church, Jermuk, 2007
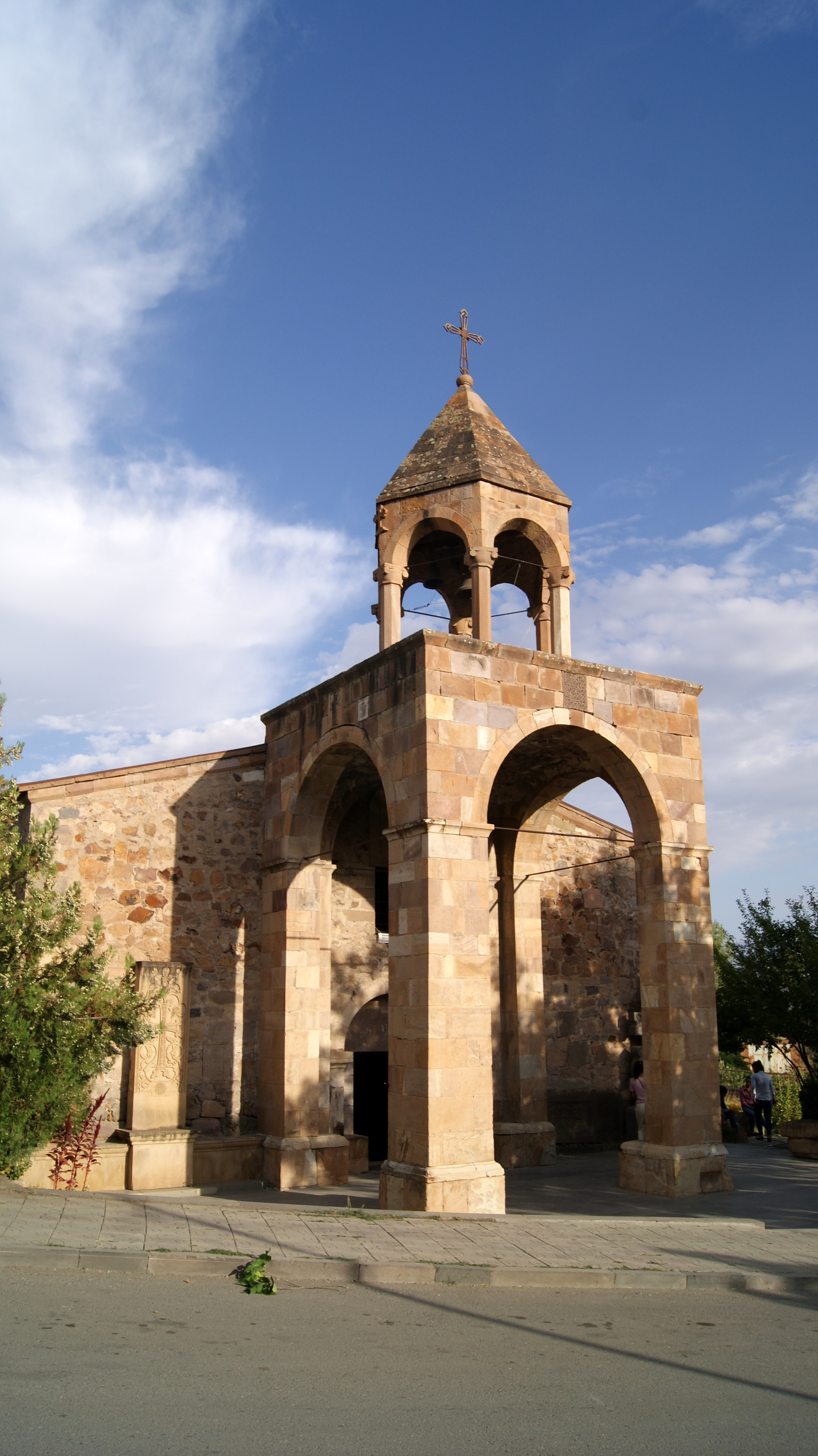
Holy Mother of God Cathedral, Yeghegnadzor

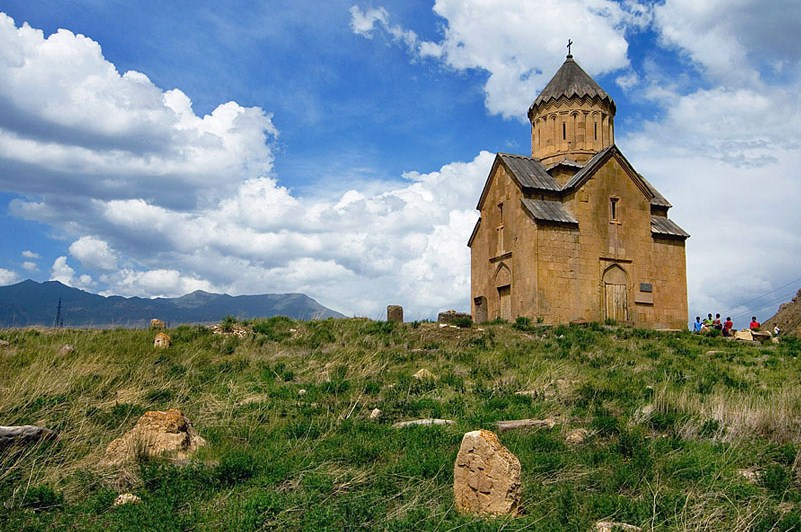
Holy Mother of God Church, Areni

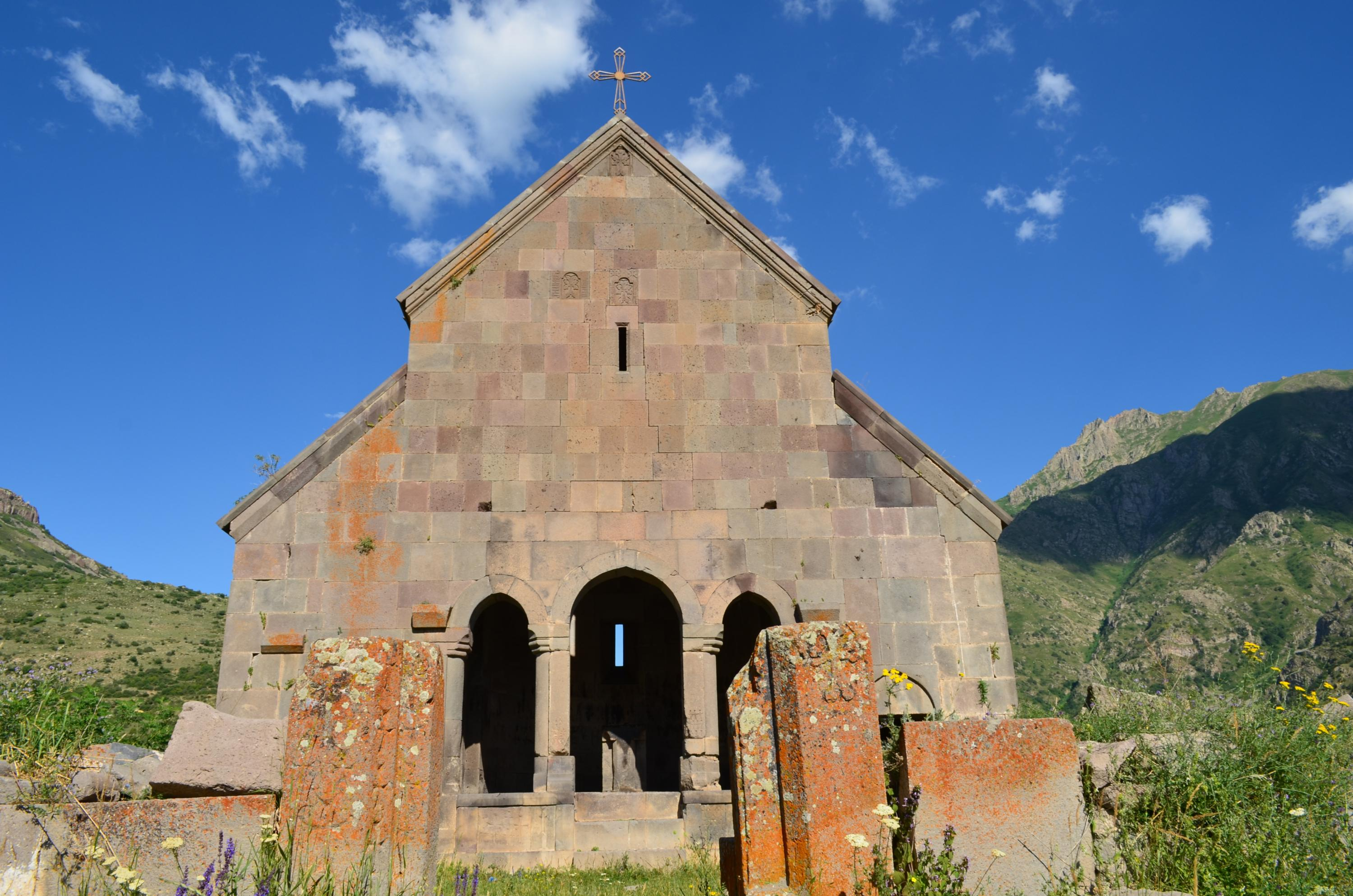
Zorats Surp Stepanos Church, Yeghegis

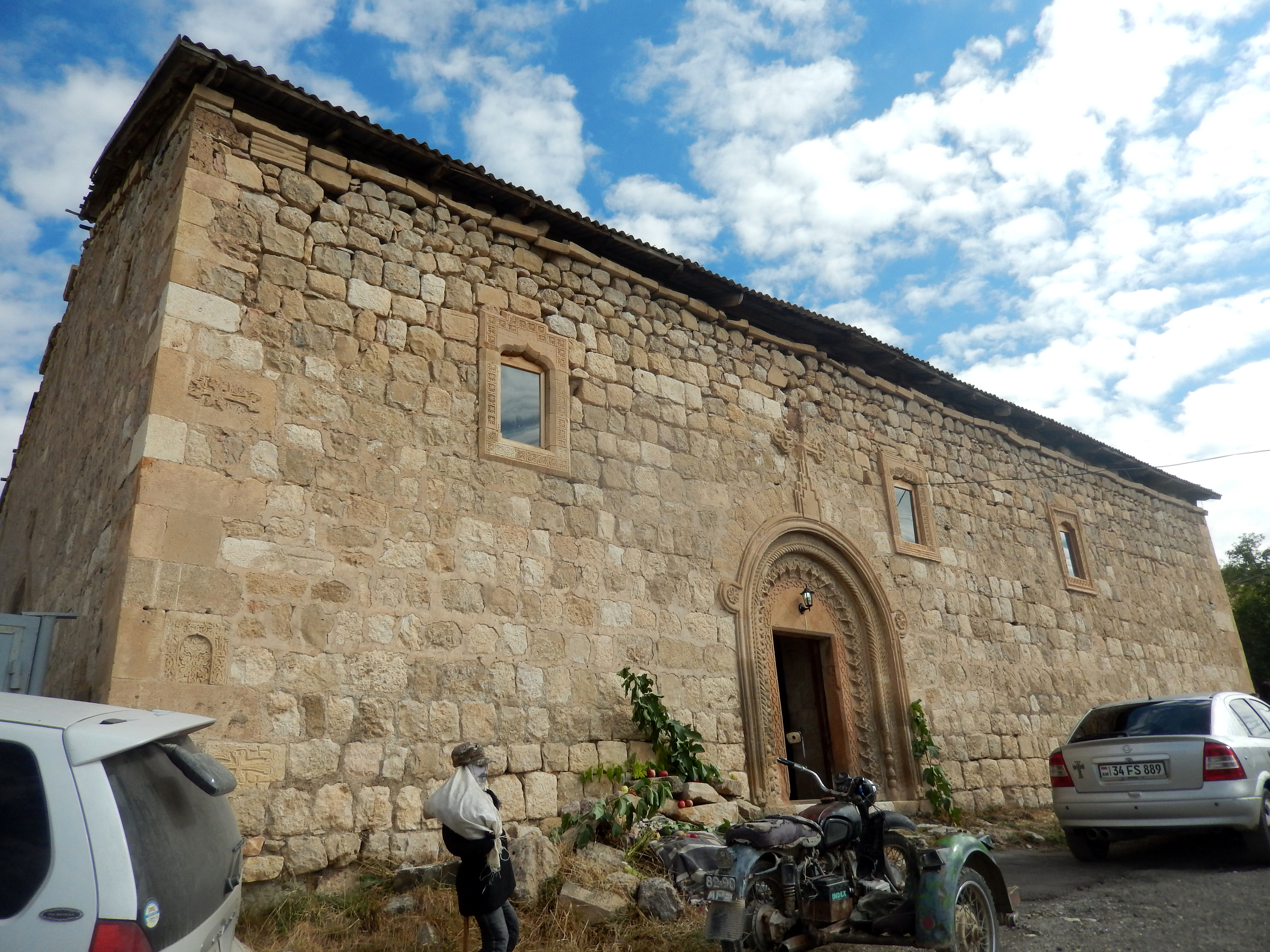
Holy Mother of God Church, Khachik

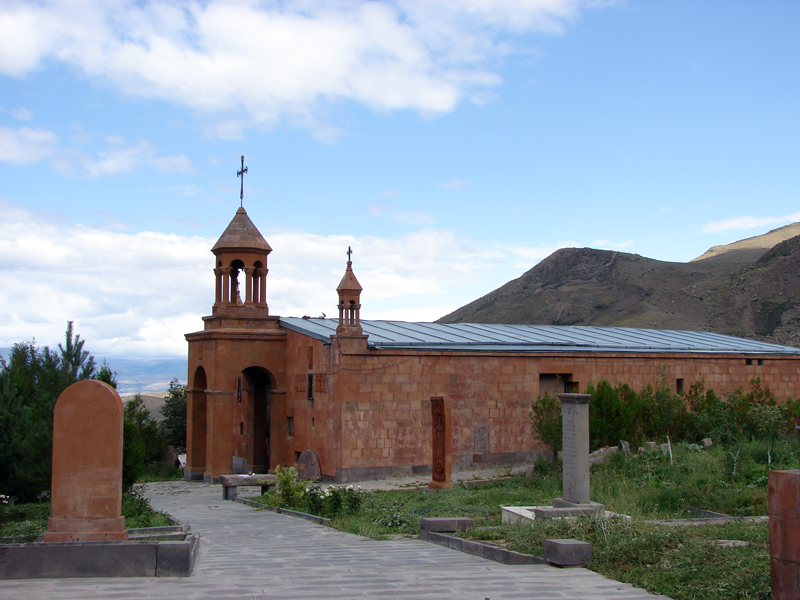
Holy Mother of God Church, Martiros

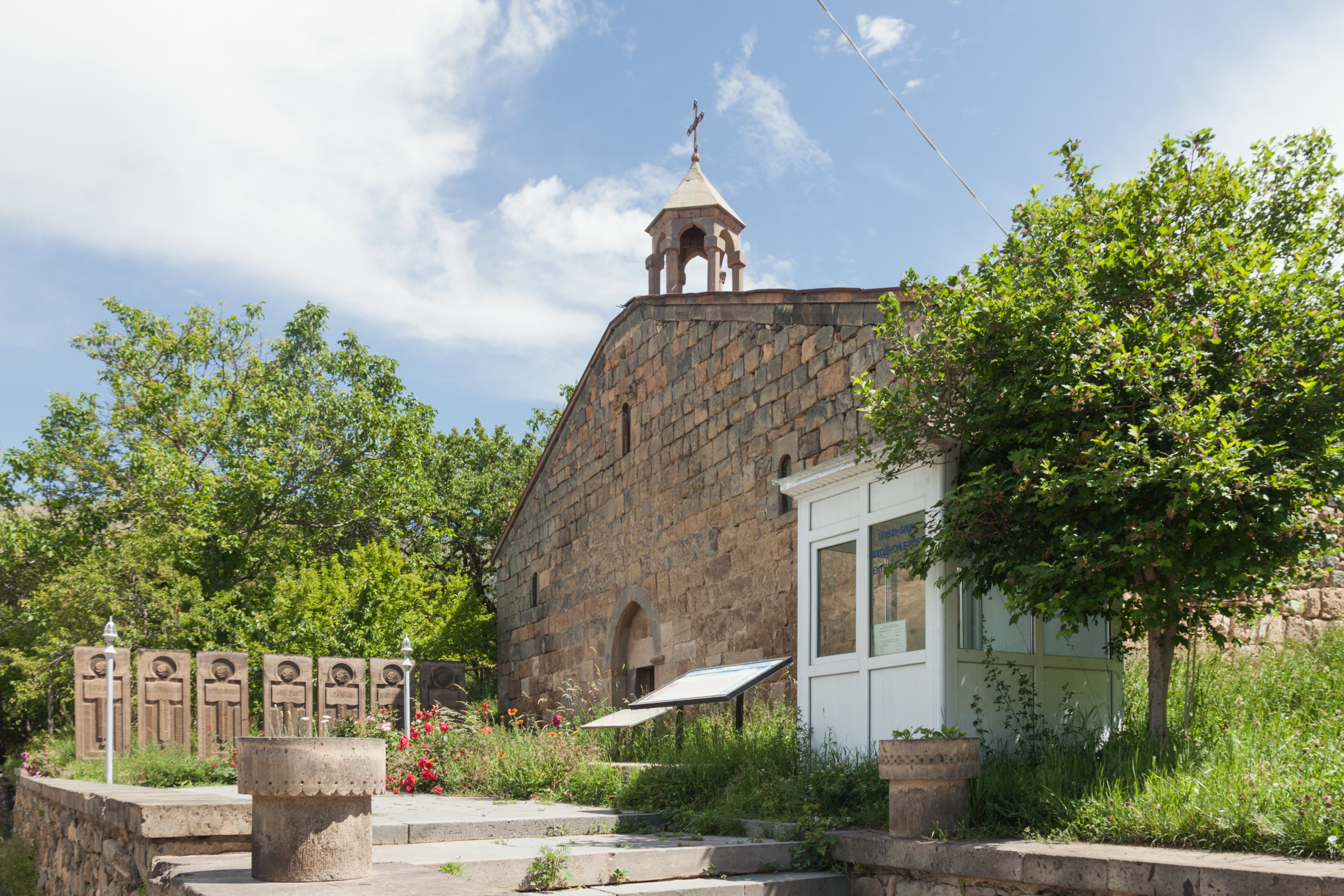
Surp Hakob Church, Vernashen

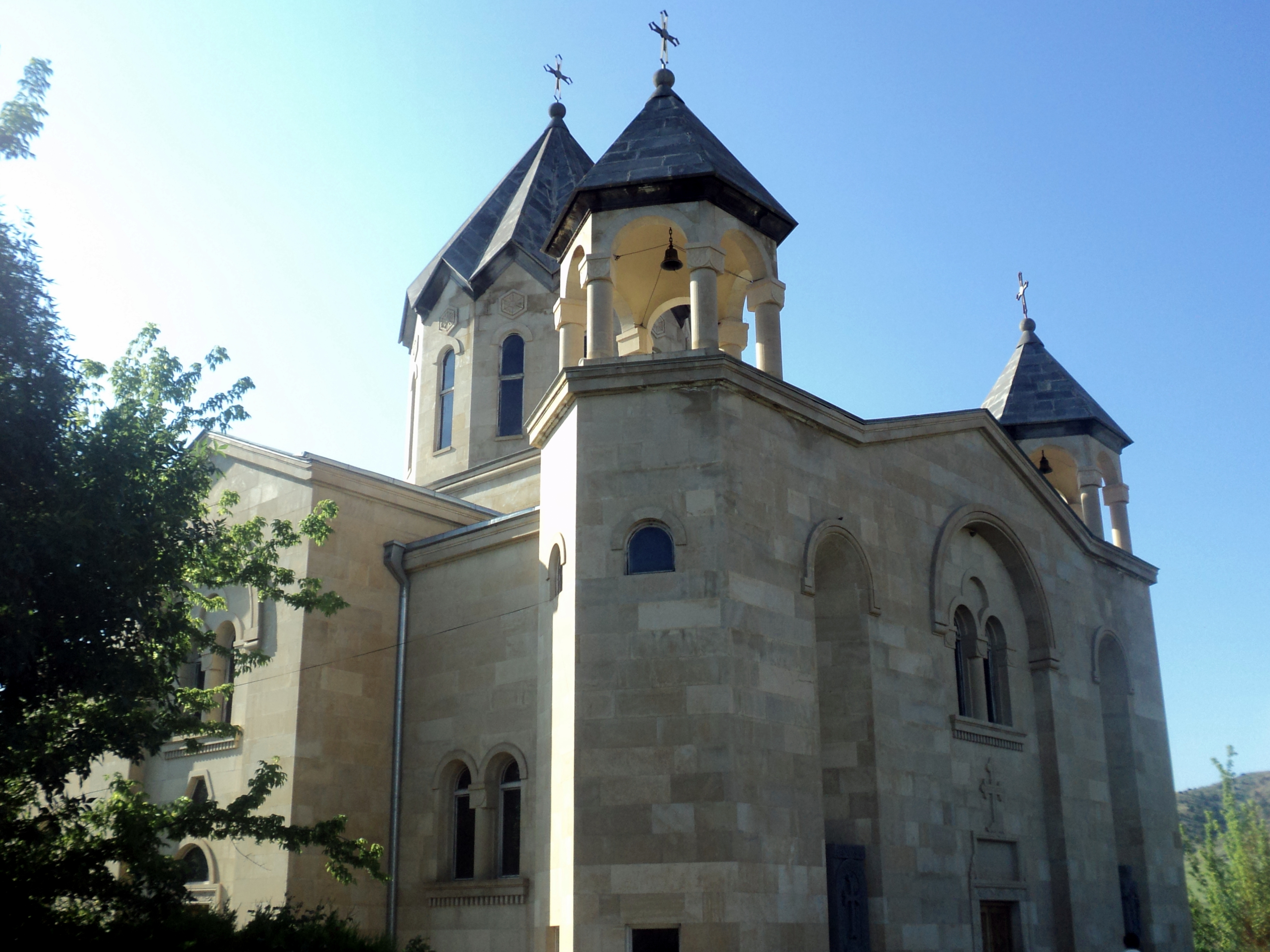
Saint Trdat Church, Vayk

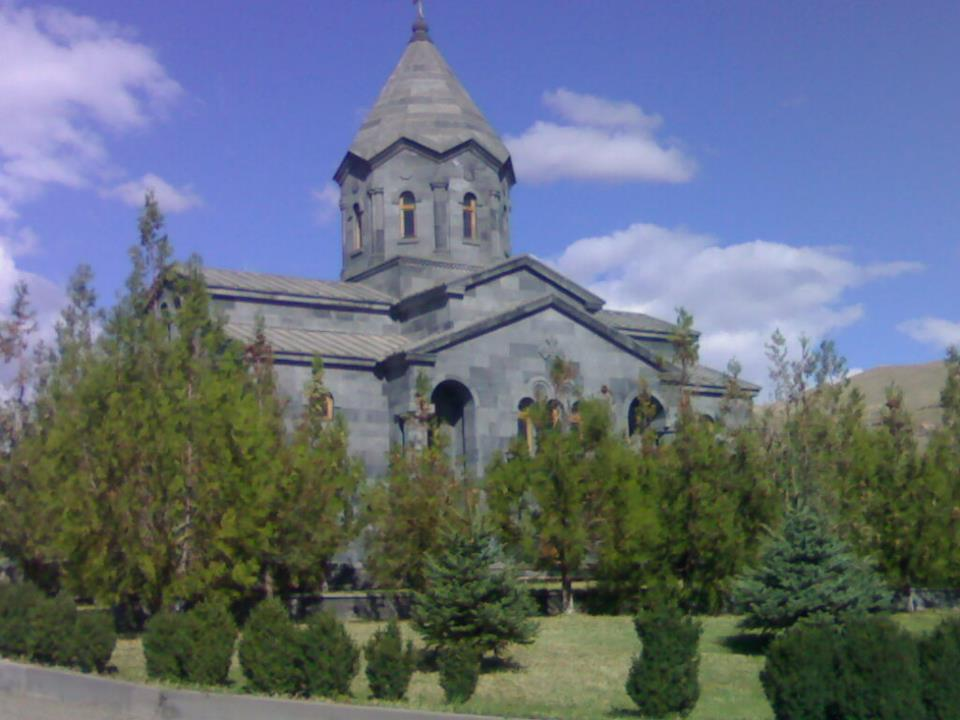
Saint Anne Church, Malishka

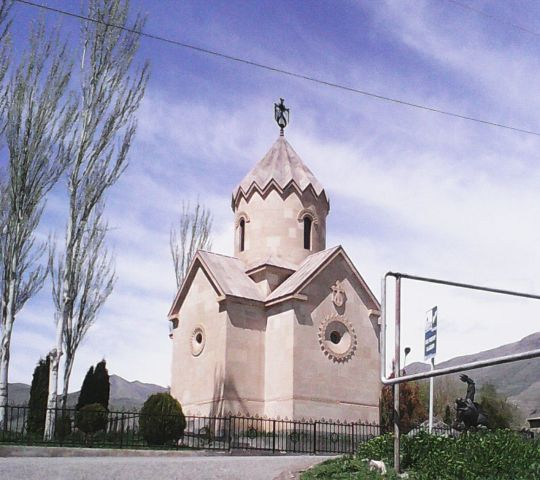
Saint Mariam Church, Aghavnadzor

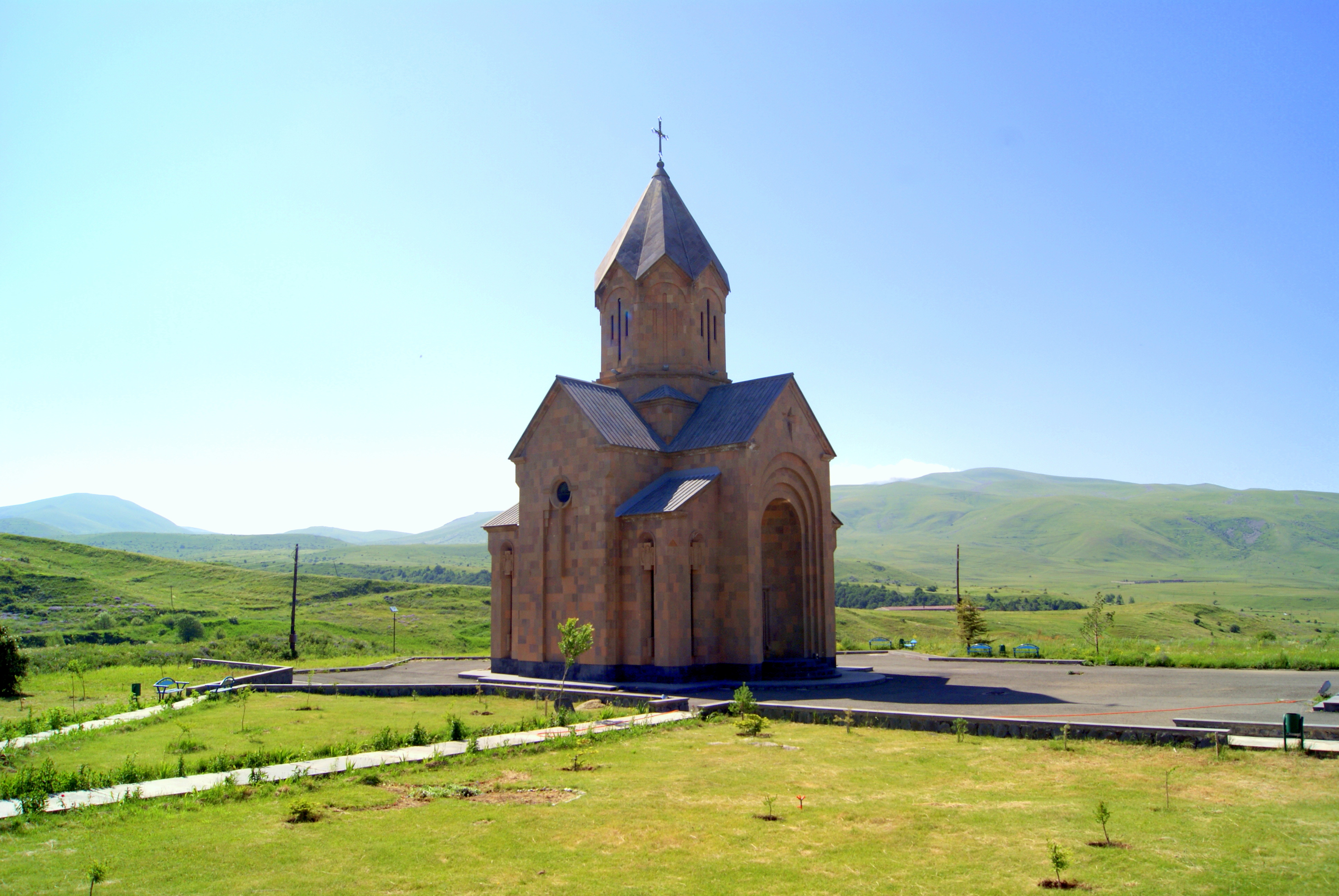
Saint Gayane Church, Jermuk

=== Monasteries ===
- Noravank near Areni, 1205
- Spitakavor Monastery near Vernashen, 1321
- Arkaz Holy Cross Monastery near Vernashen, 1872
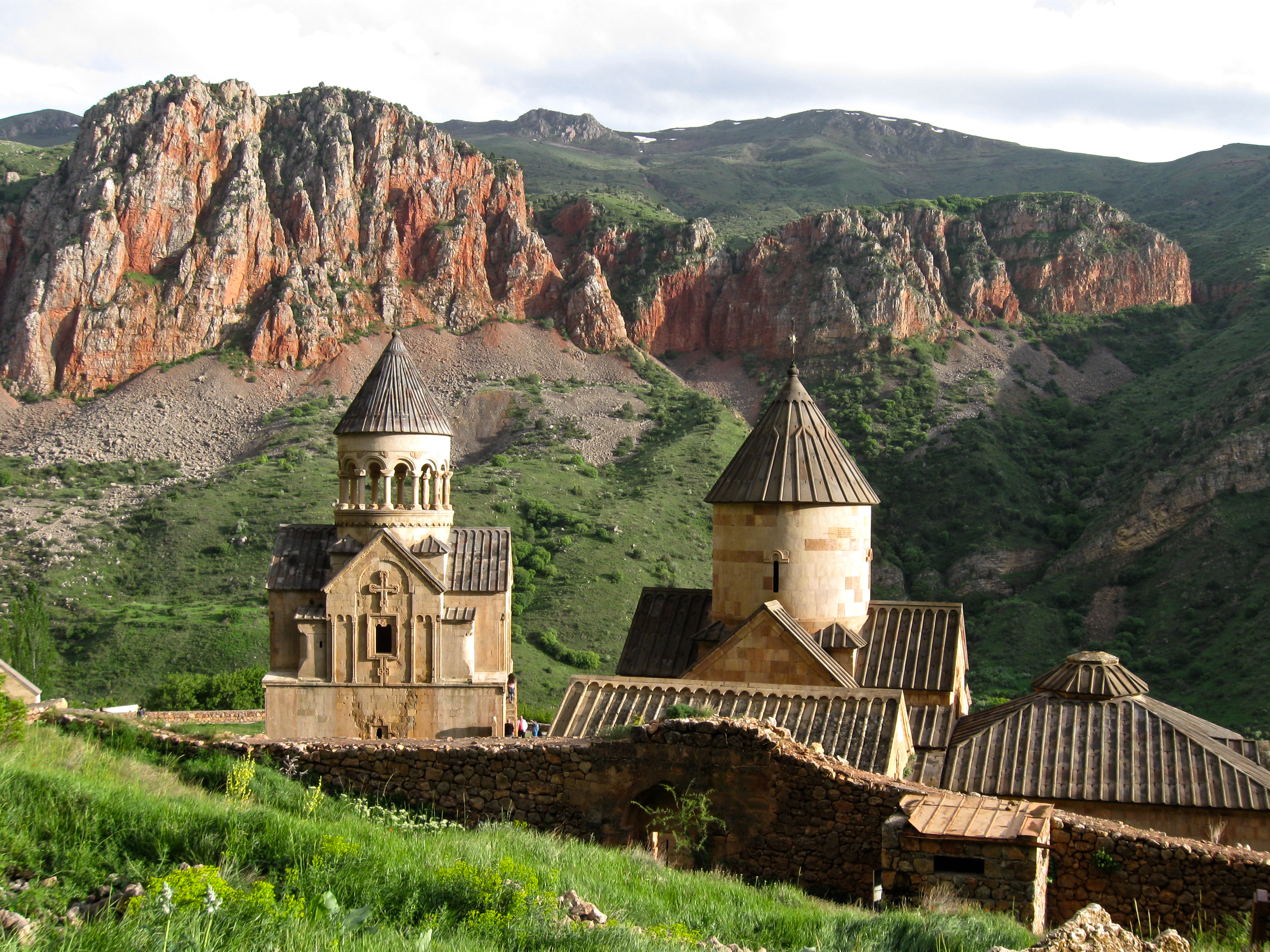
Noravank near Areni, 1205

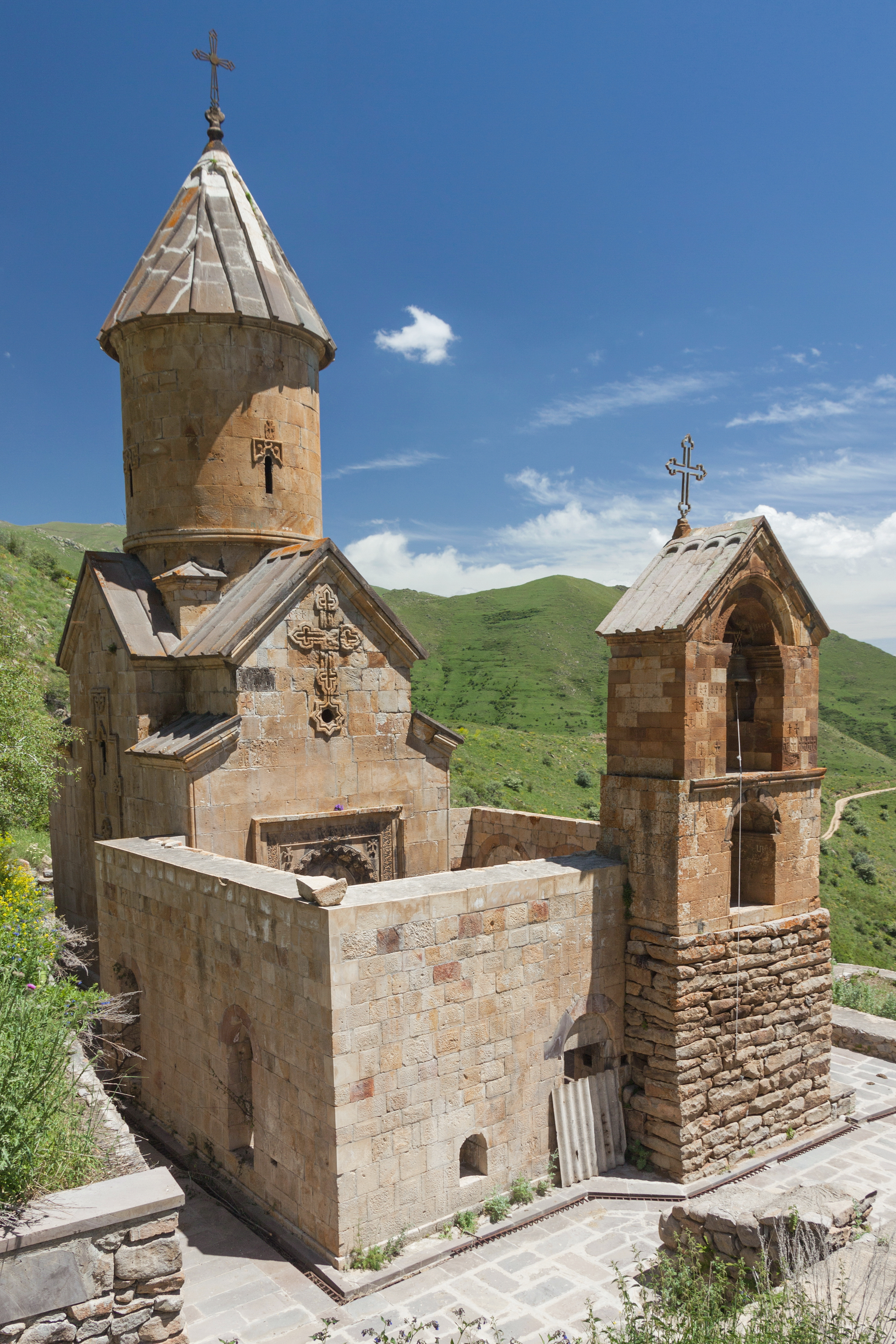
Spitakavor Monastery near Vernashen, 1321

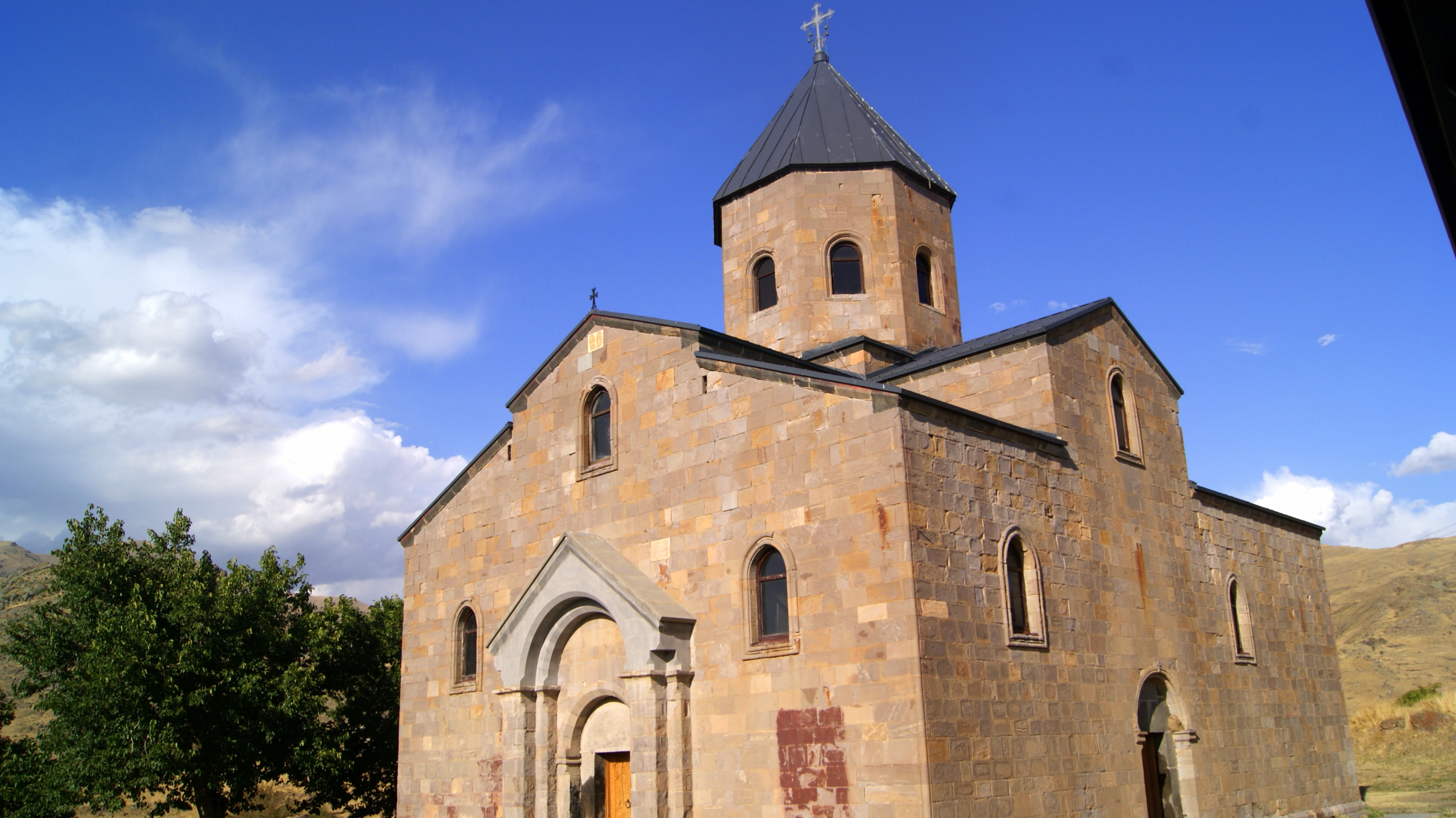
Arkaz Holy Cross Monastery near Vernashen, 1872

=== Chapels ===
- Surp Mariam Chapel, Martiros, 2004
- Saint Gayane Chapel, Kechut, 2007
- Surp Yeghishe Chapel, Gndevaz, 2013

== Inactive/ruined churches and monasteries ==
- Arates Monastery near Arates, 7th century
- Tanahat Monastery near Vernashen, 8-13th centuries
- Karevank Monastery near Yeghegis, 9-10th centuries
- Shativank near Shatin, 929
- Gndevank near Gndevaz, 936
- Tsaghats Kar Monastery near Artabuynk, 10th century
- Hermon Monastery near Yeghegis, 10th century
- Holy Mother of God Church, Yeghegis, 10th century
- Khotakerats Monastery near Khachik, 10th century
- Saint Zion Monastery near Herher, 10-13th centuries
- Surp Mamas Monastery near Salli, 12-13th centuries
- Surp Nshan Church, Yeghegis, 13th century
- Martirosavank Monastery, Martiros, 1286
- Holy Mother of God Church, Gndevaz, 1686
- Church of the Holy Archangels, Horbategh, 1692
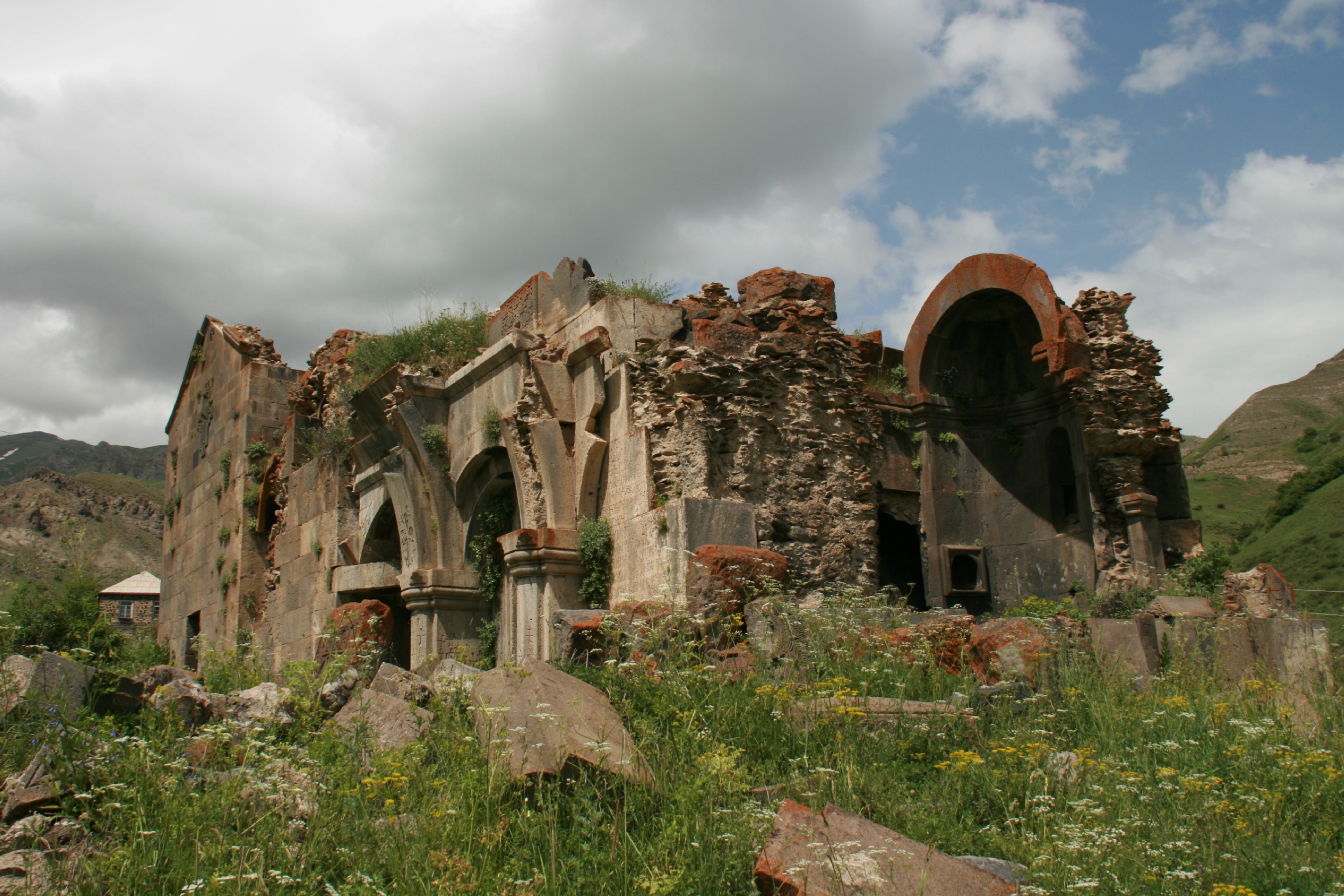
Arates Monastery near Arates, 7th century

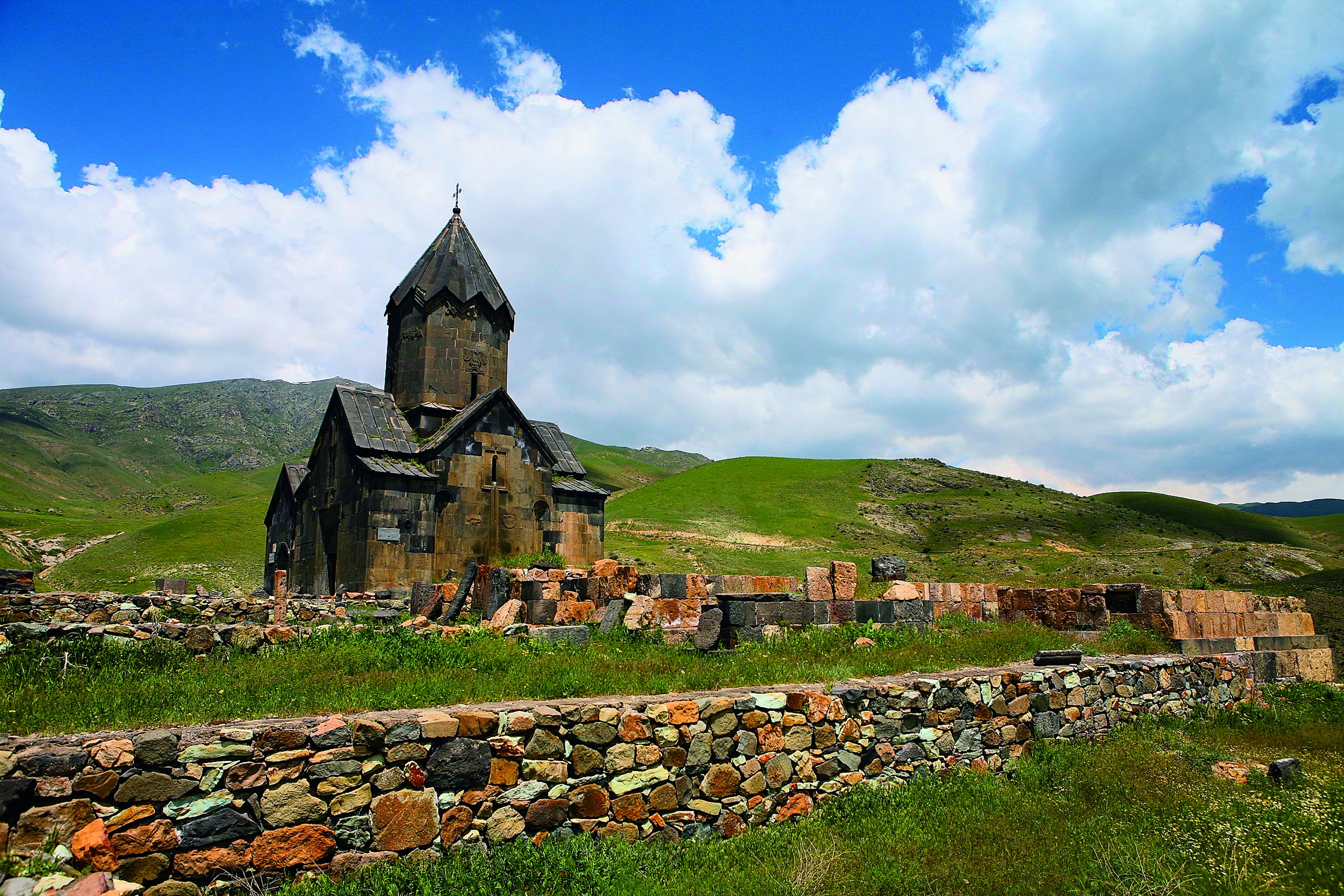
Tanahat Monastery near Vernashen, 8-13th centuries

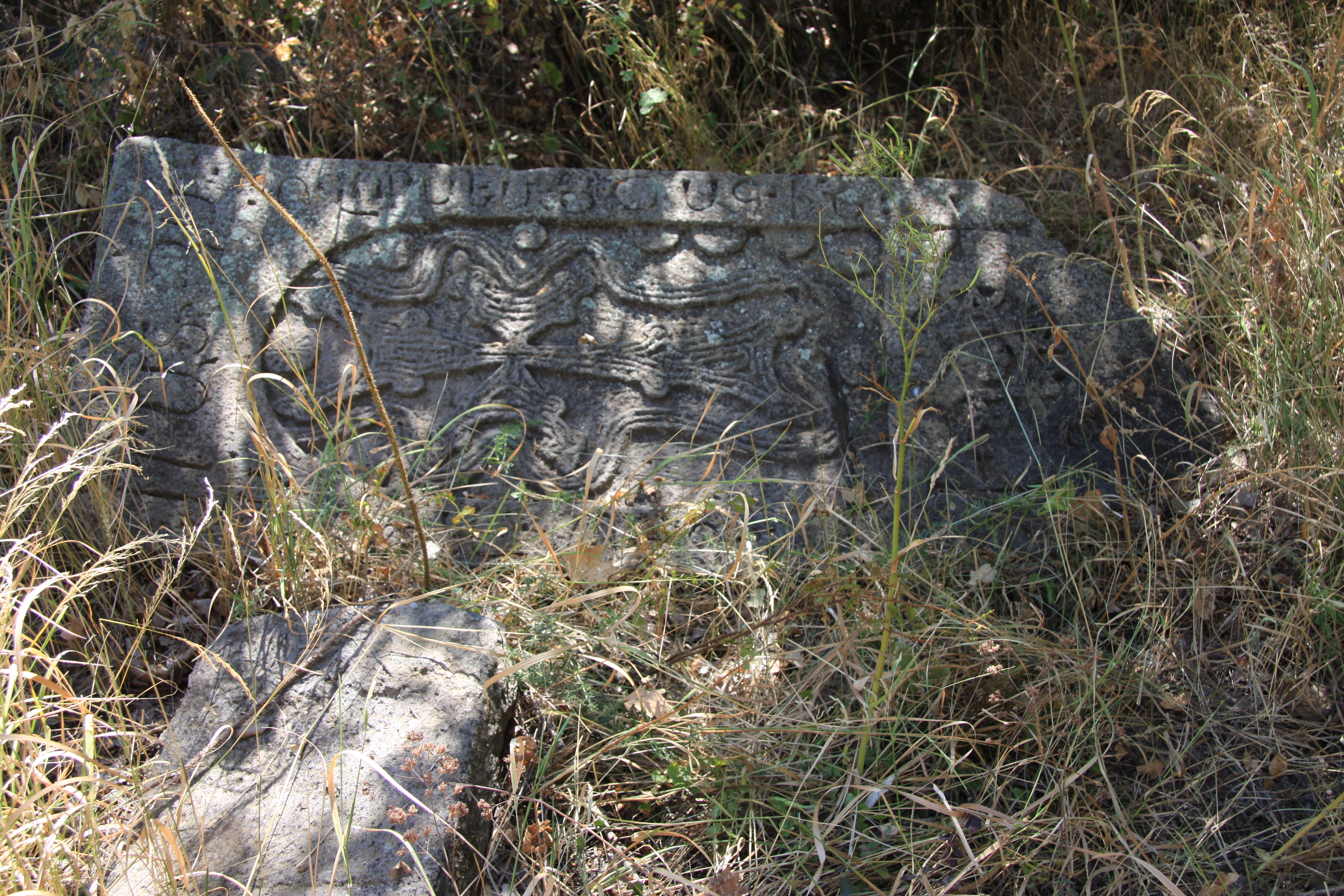
Ruins of Karevank Monastery near Yeghegis, 9-10th centuries

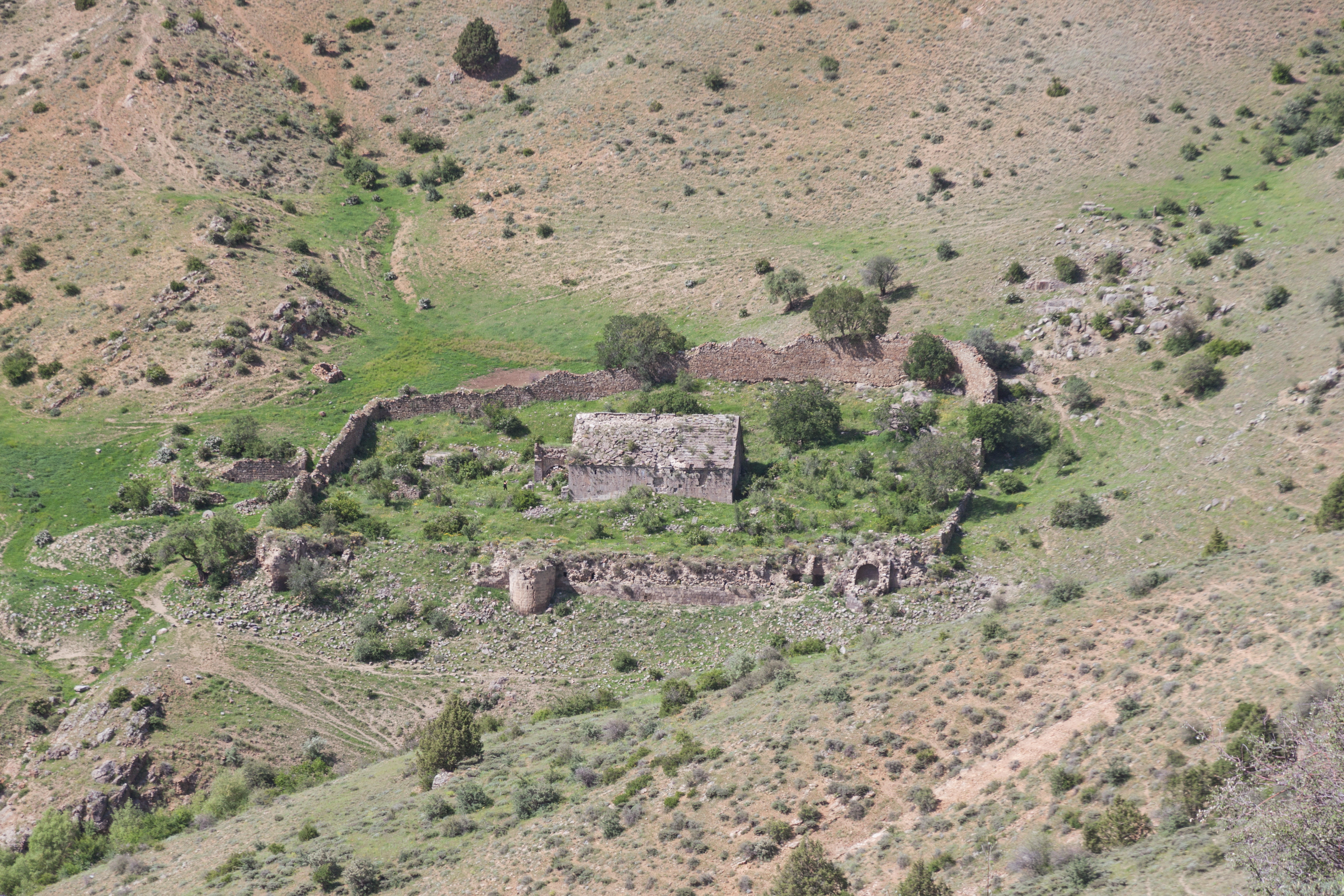
Shativank near Shatin, 929

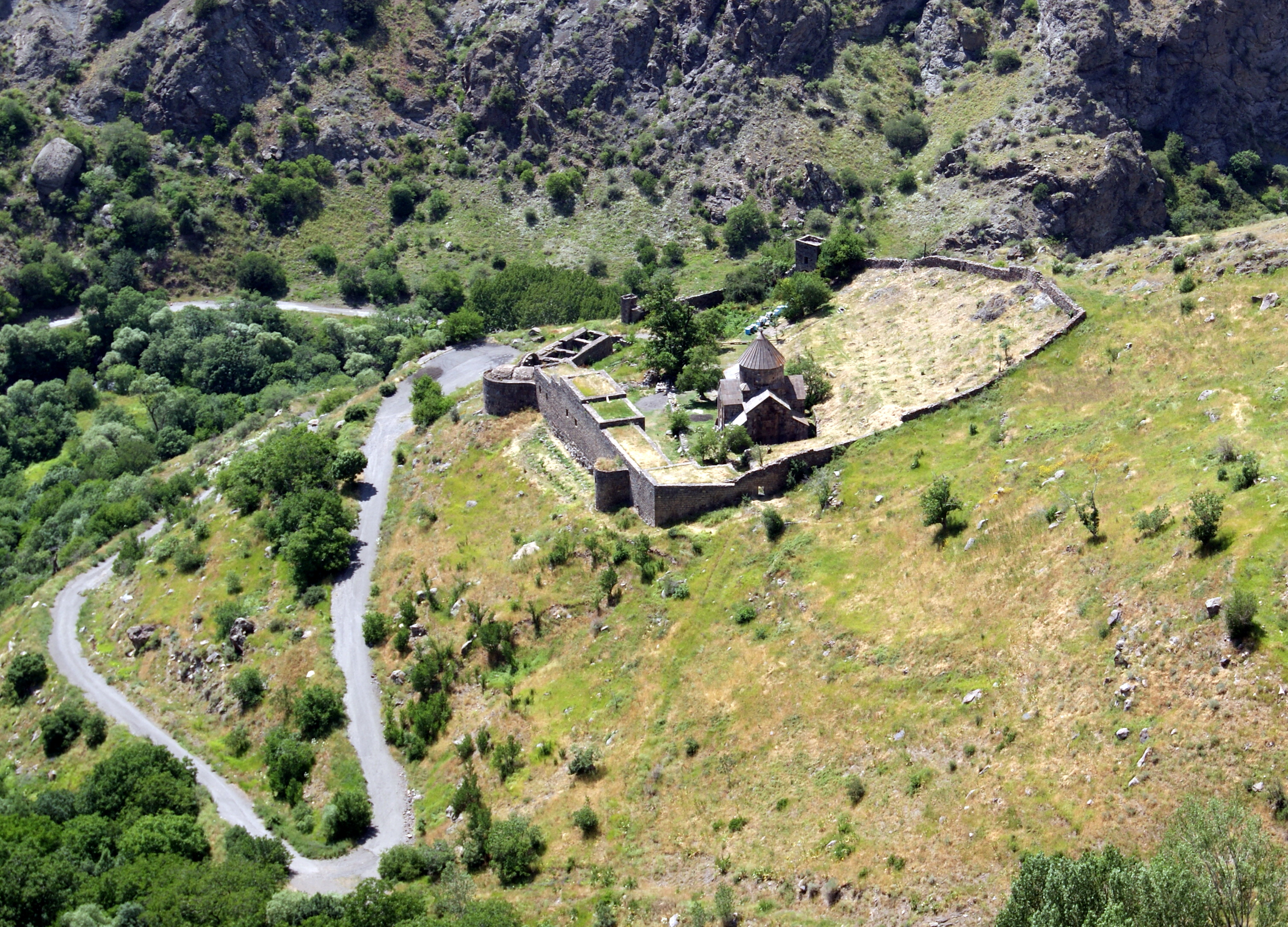
Gndevank near Gndevaz, 936

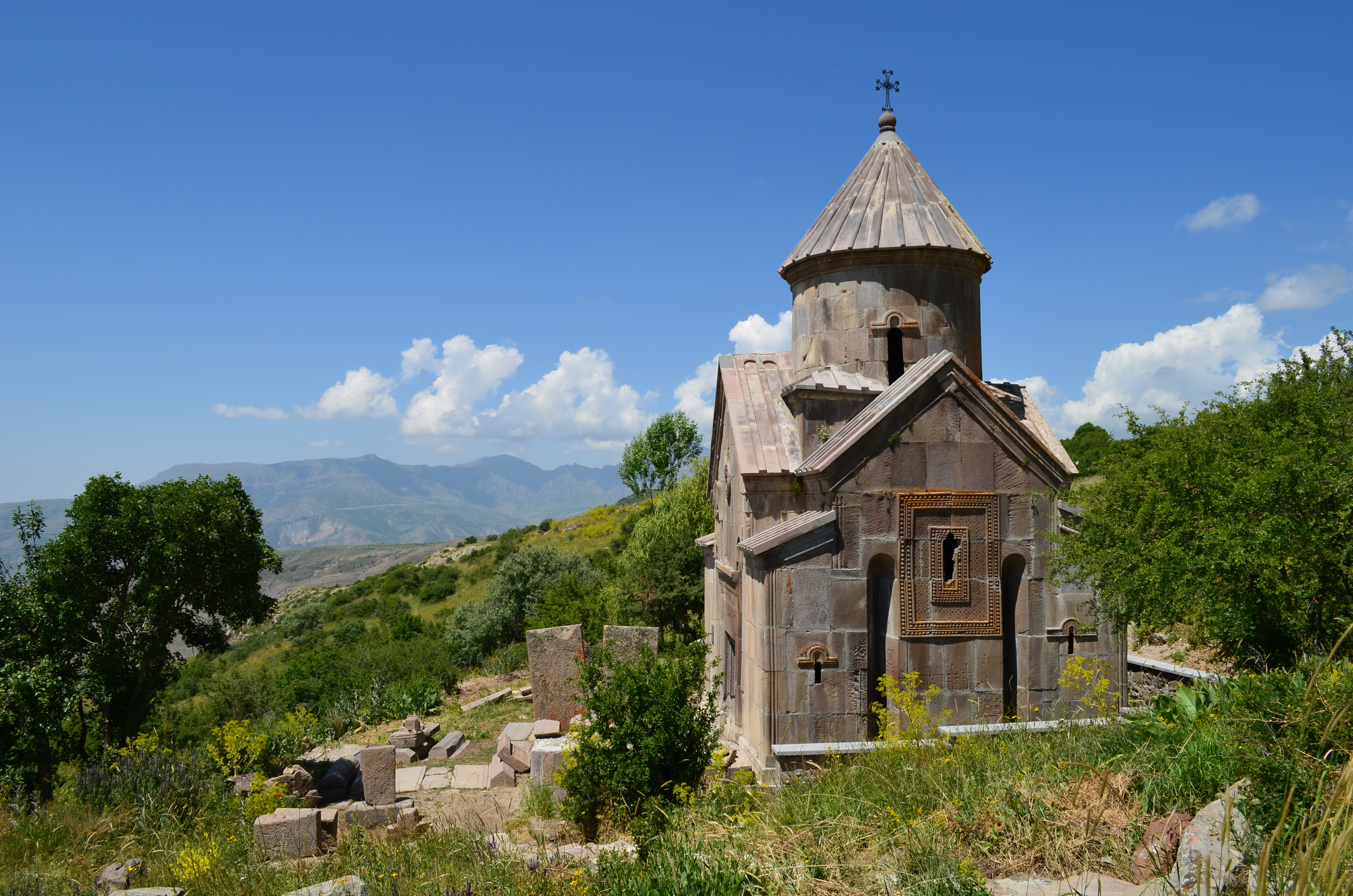
Tsaghats Kar Monastery near Artabuynk, 10th century

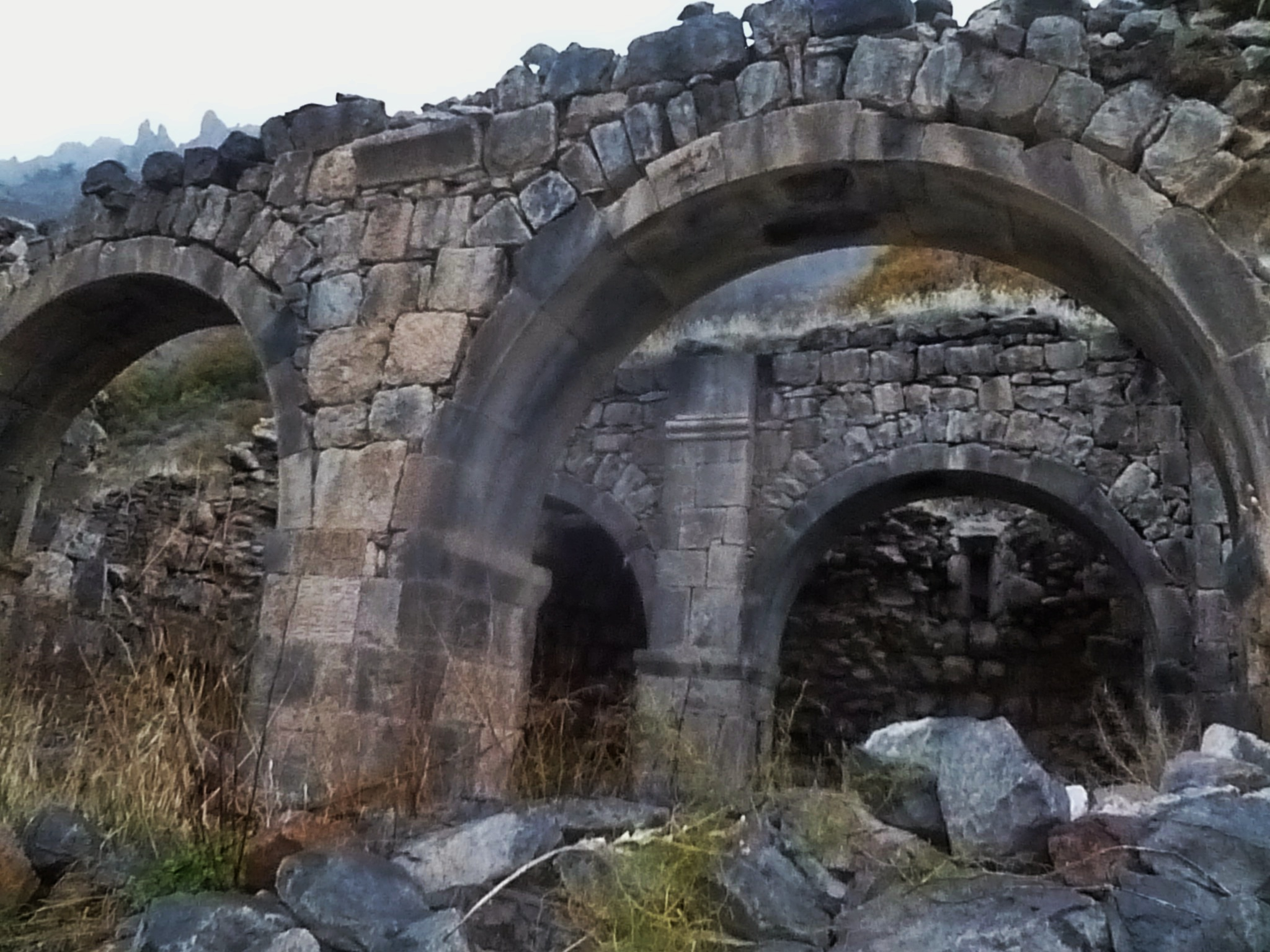
Hermon Monastery near Yeghegis, 10th century

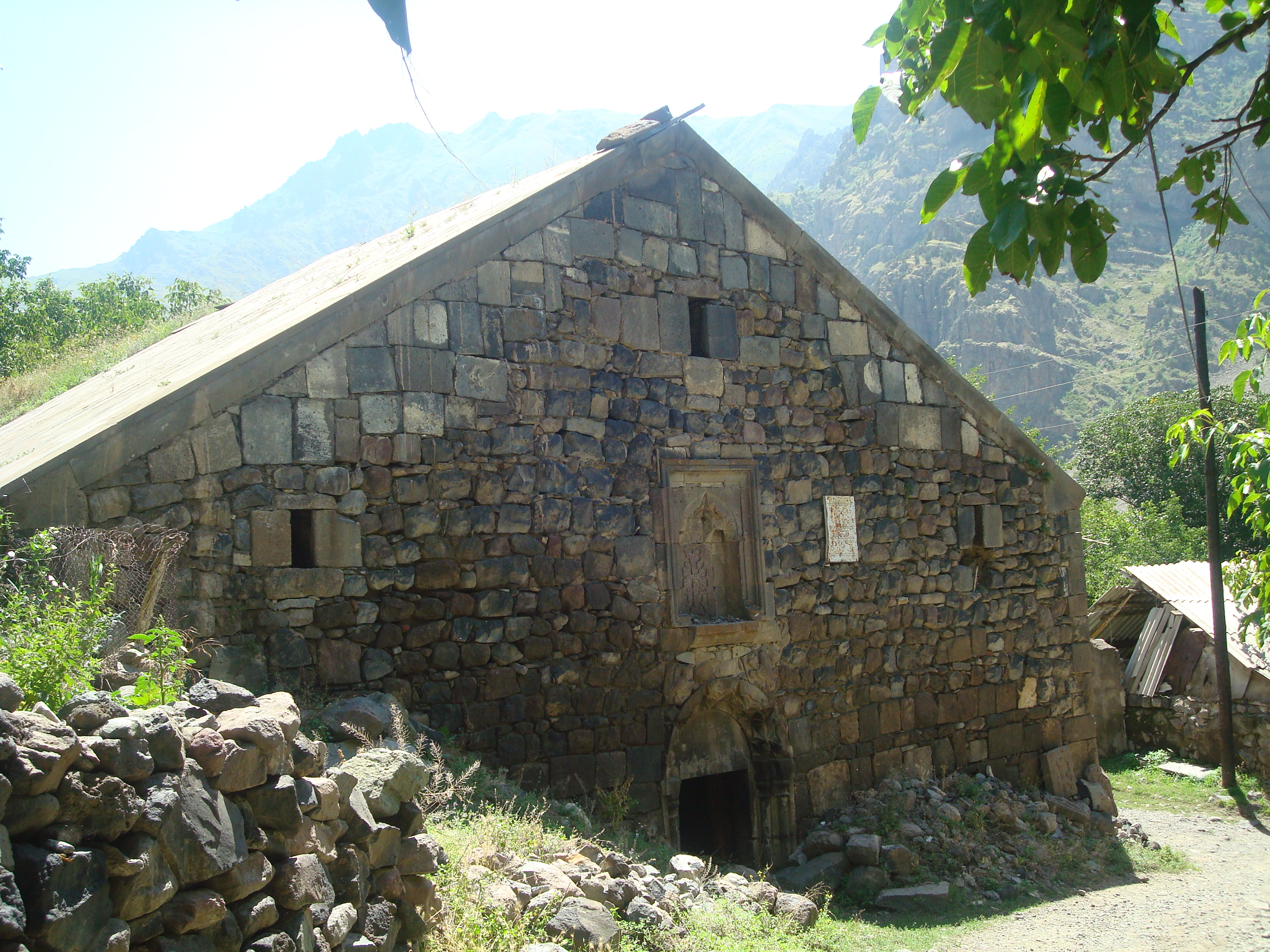
Holy Mother of God Church, Yeghegis, 10th century

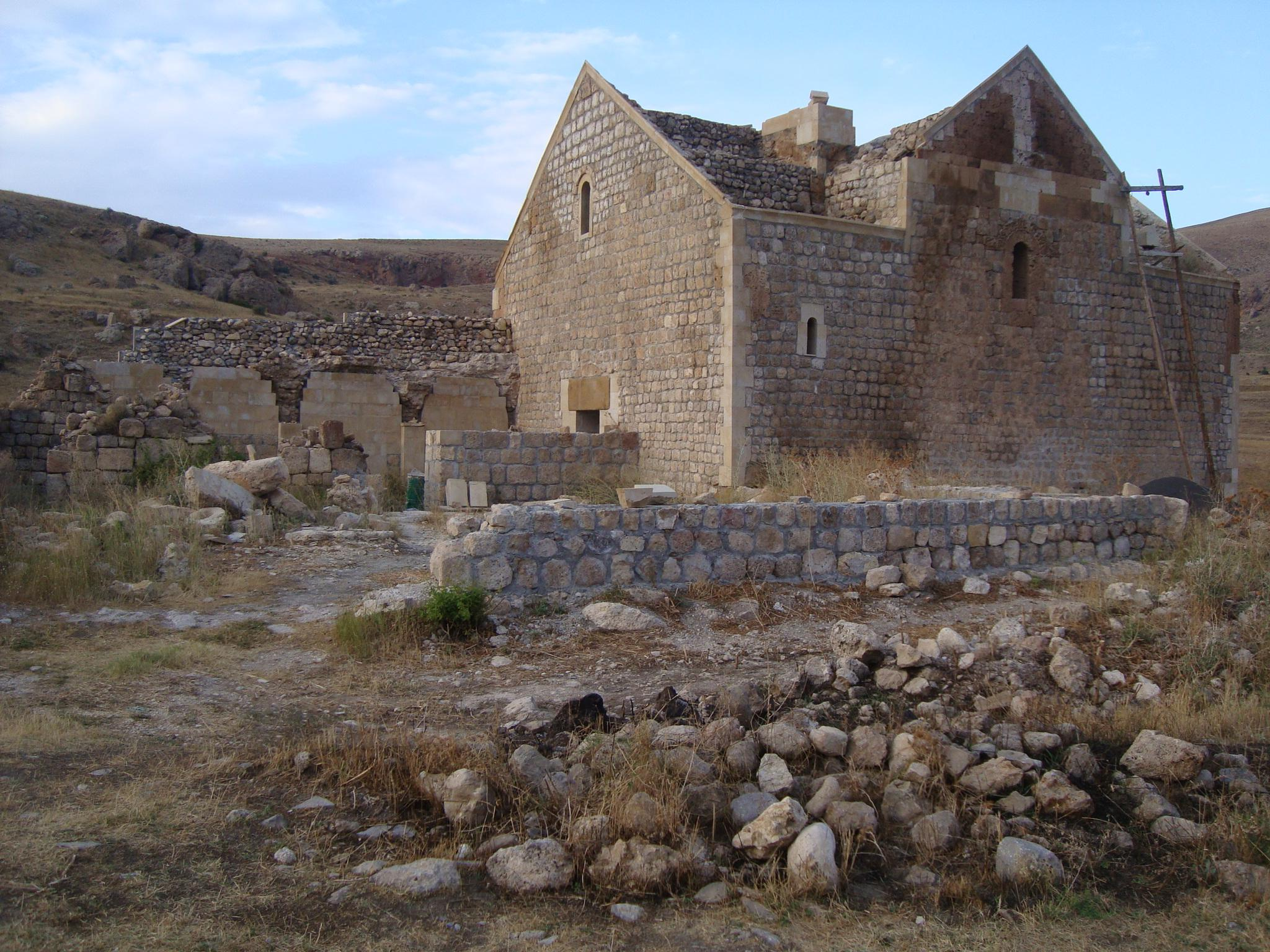
Khotakerats Monastery near Khachik, 10th century

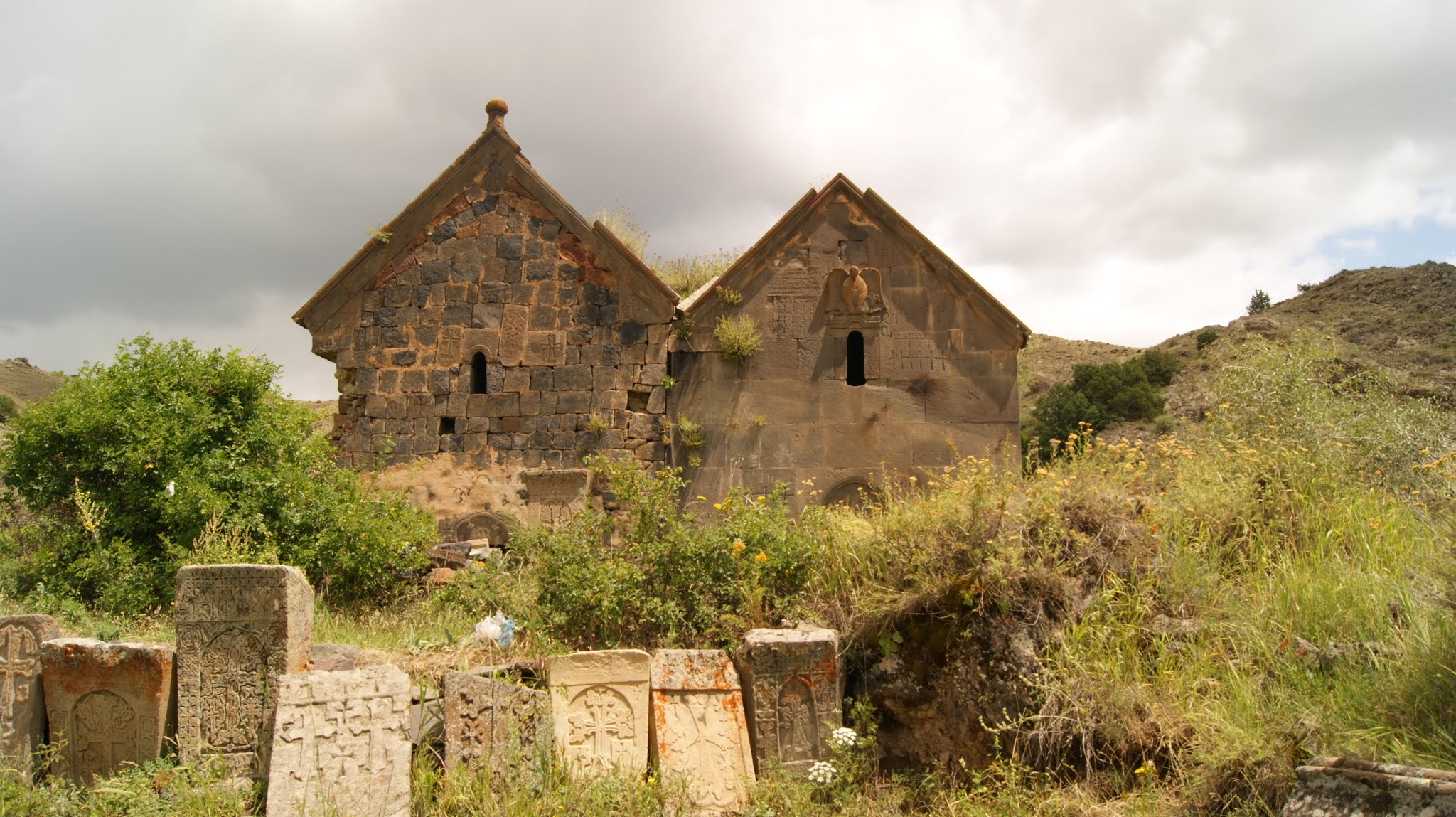
Saint Zion Monastery near Herher, 10-13th centuries

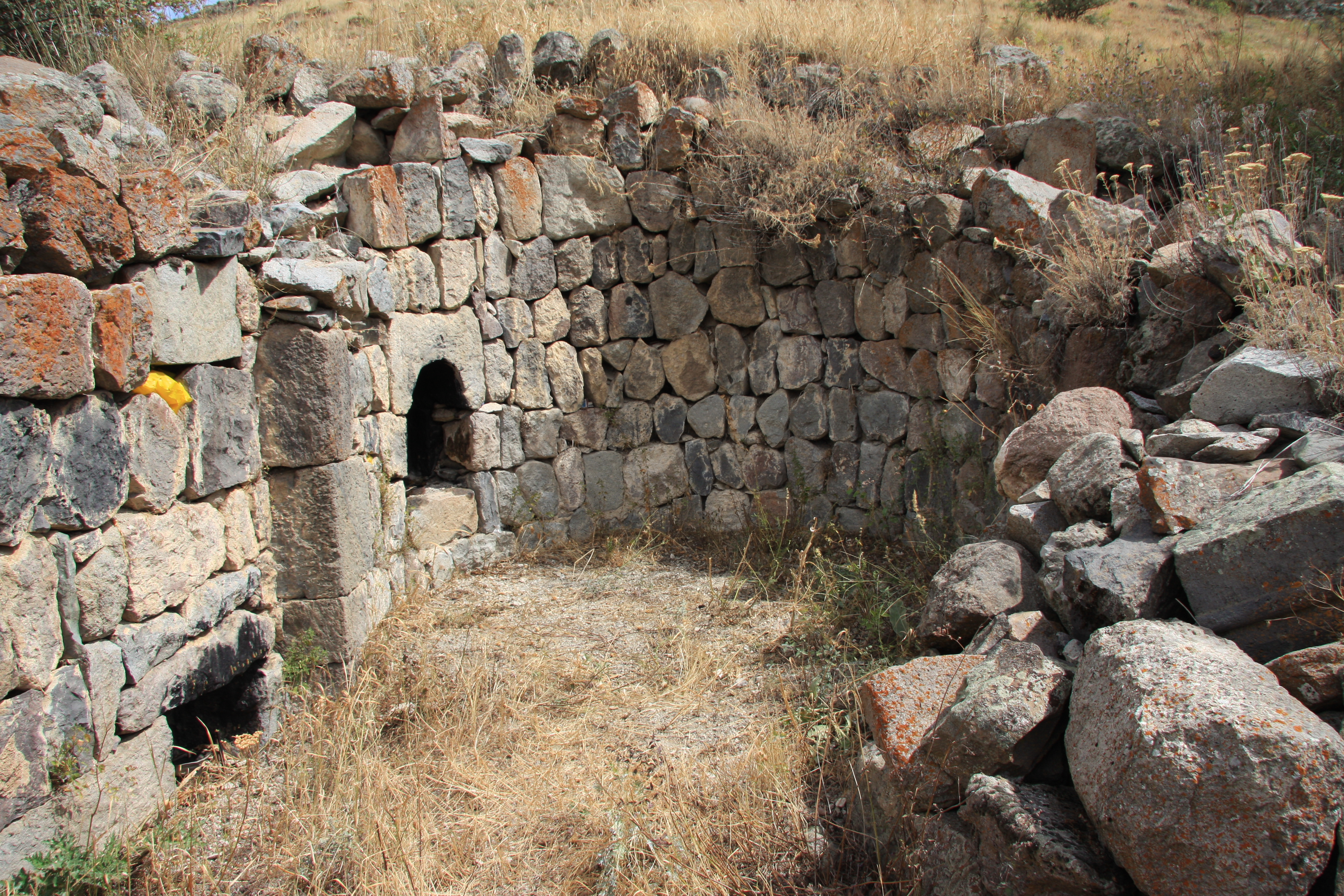
Surp Mamas Monastery near Salli, 12-13th centuries

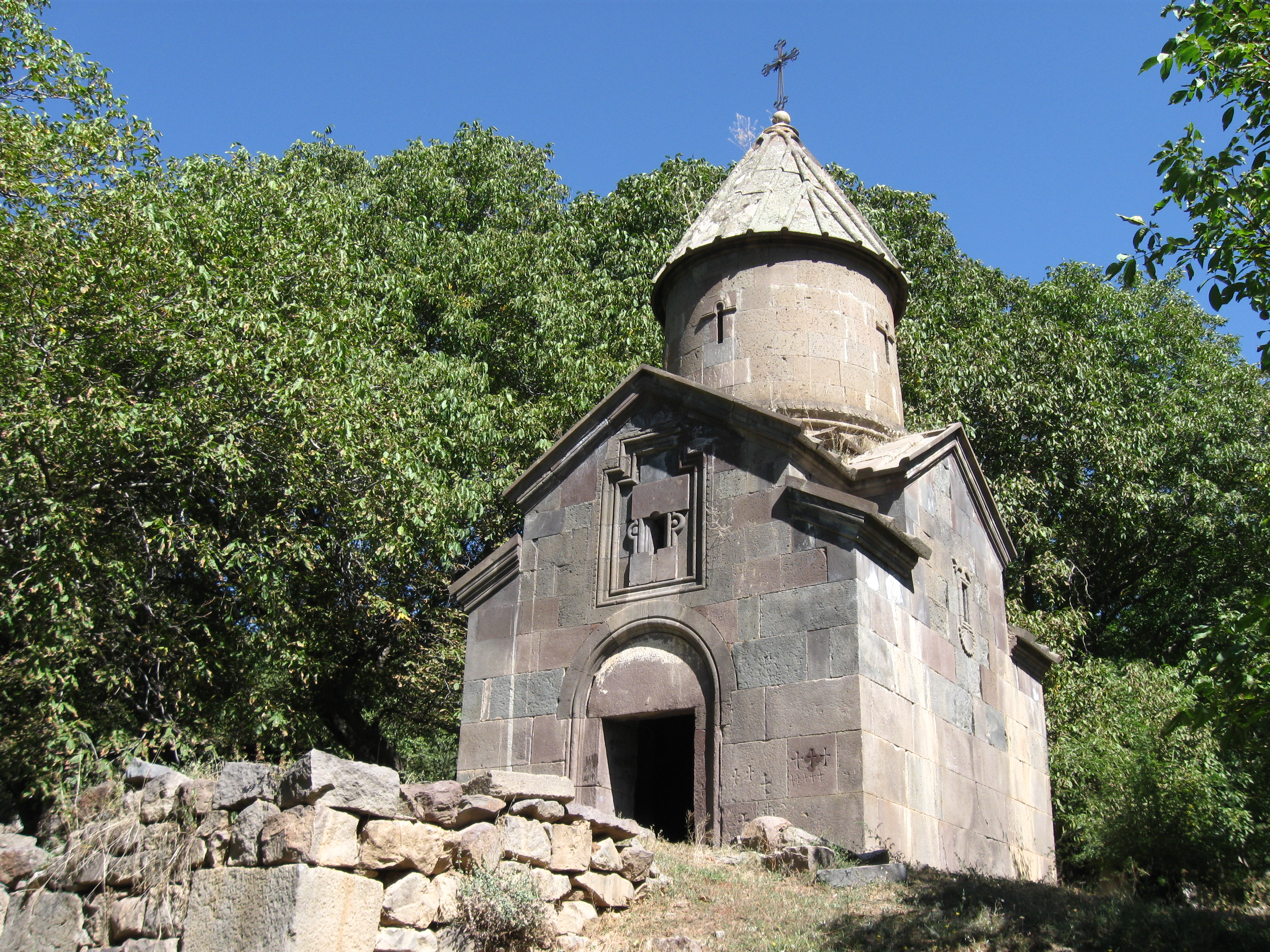
Surp Nshan Church, Yeghegis, 13th century

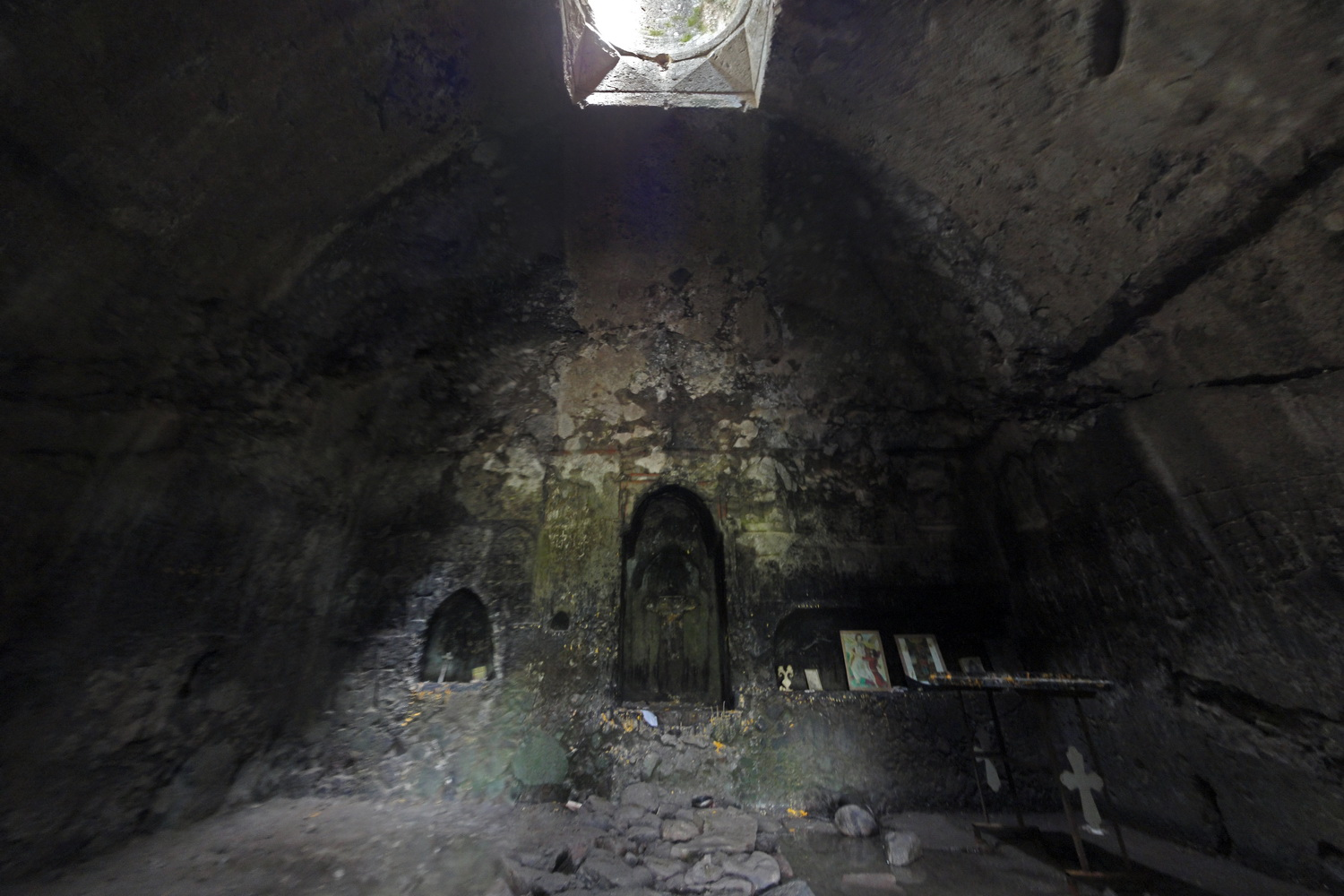
Martirosavank Monastery, Martiros, 1286

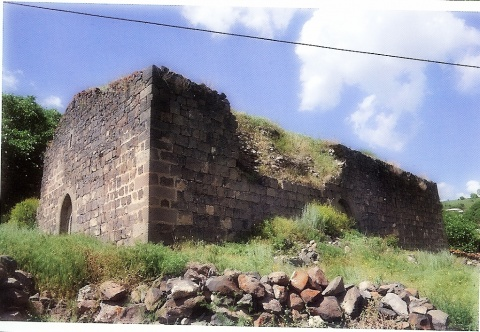
Holy Mother of God Church, Gndevaz, 1686

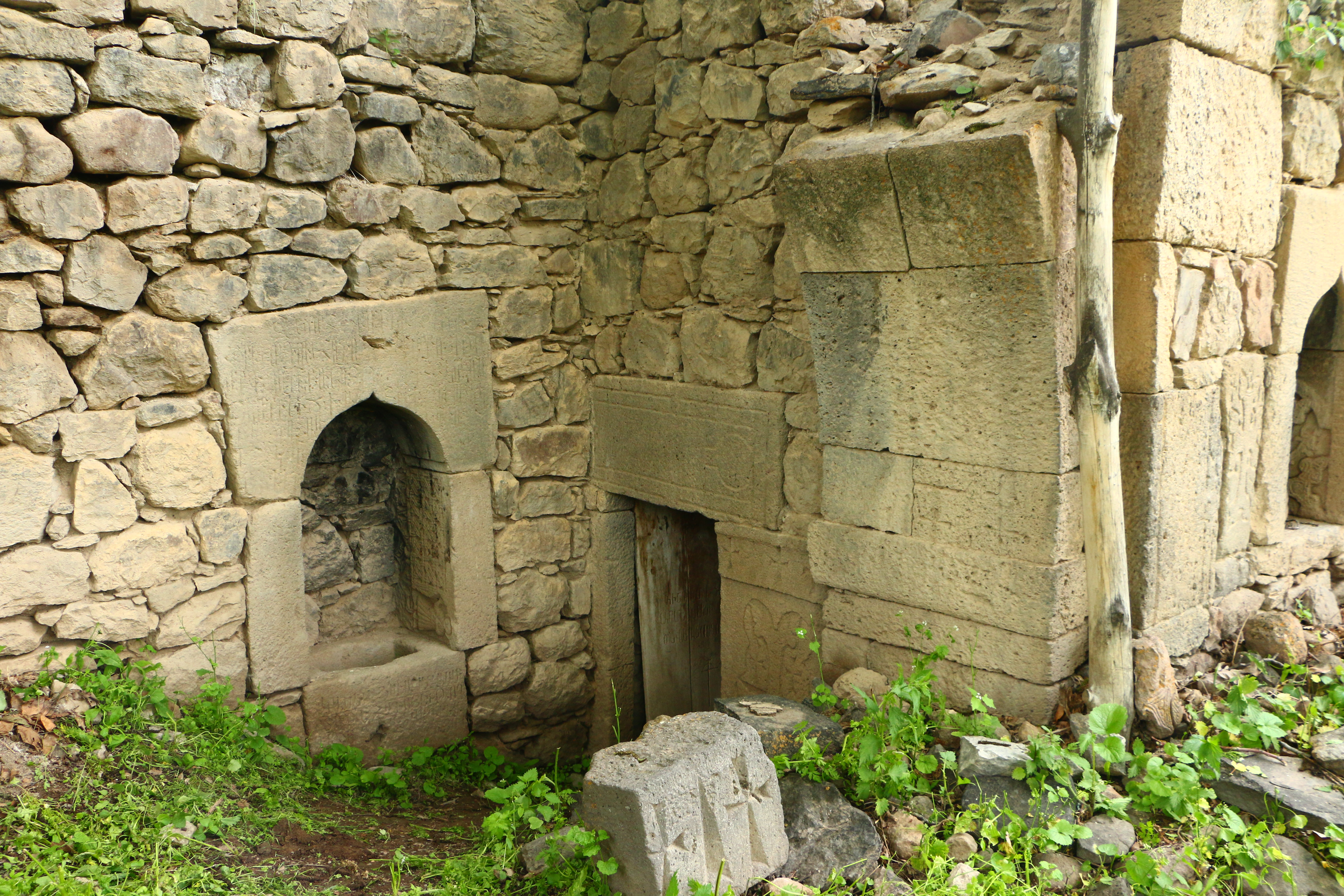
Church of the Holy Archangels, Horbategh, 1692

== Primates ==
- Archbishop Abraham Mkrtchyan (10 December 2010 - )
