= Başkənd =

Başkənd may refer to:

- Artsvashen, Armenia (a.k.a. Başkənd in Azerbaijani)
- Başkənd, Kalbajar, Azerbaijan
- Başkənd, Khojali, Azerbaijan
- Başkənd, Nakhchivan, Azerbaijan

== See also ==
- Bashkend (disambiguation)
- Başköy (disambiguation)
