= Bashkend =

Bashkend may refer to:

- Artsvashen, Exclave of Armenia, officially called Bashkand
- Gegharkunik, Gegharkunik, Armenia, formerly Bashkend
- Vernashen, Armenia, formerly Bashkend

== See also ==
- Başkənd (disambiguation)
- Başköy (disambiguation)
