= St. Gevorg Church (Disar) =

Armenian church in Nakhchivan, Azerbaijan

- Սուրբ Գևորգ եկեղեցի
- St. Gevorg Church
- Location: Başkənd, Nakhchivan
- Country: Azerbaijan
- Denomination: Armenian Apostolic Church

History
- Founded: 17th century

Architecture
- Demolished: 1997–2000

St. Gevorg Church was an Armenian church located on high ground in the center of Bashkand (Disar) village of (Ordubad district) of the Nakhchivan Autonomous Republic of Azerbaijan.

== History ==
The masonry suggests that it was constructed in the 17th century, possibly in the location of an earlier structure. The church is first mentioned in 1820s and an Armenian inscription in a stone of the bema indicates renovation in 1900.

== Architectural characteristics ==
St. Gevorg was single-nave church, with its hall, apse, vestries, and entry on the western facade. Armenian inscriptions were placed in the interior and on the eastern facade.

== Destruction ==
The church was still standing in the 1980s and it was destroyed by February 3, 2000, as documented by investigation of the Caucasus Heritage Watch.
