= Proshaberd =

Armenian fortress

Proshaberd Պռոշաբերդ
- Vayots Dzor Province, Armenia
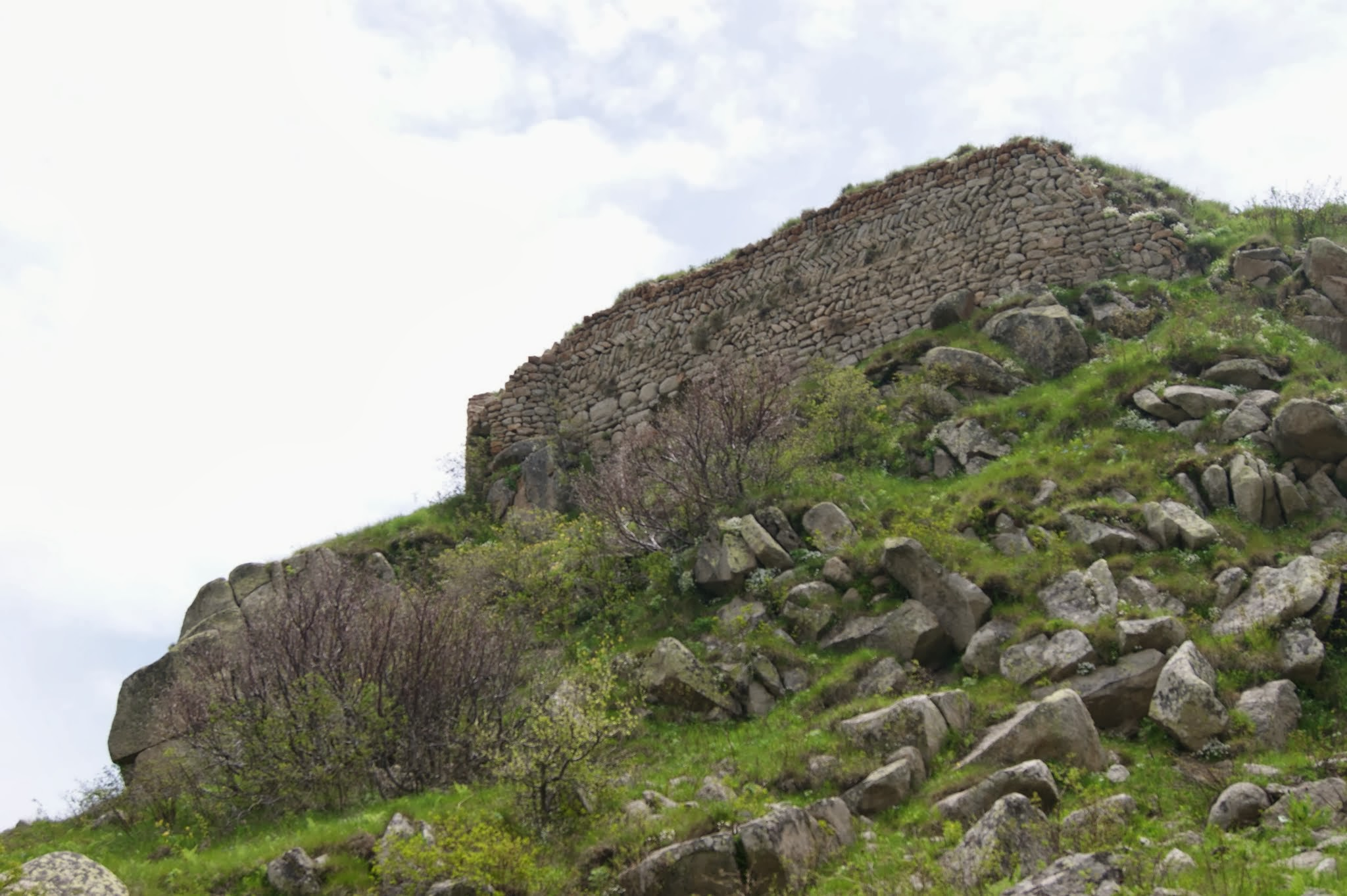

Site information
- Type: Fortress
- Open to the public: Yes

Location
- Shown within Armenia Proshaberd; Պռոշաբերդ (Vayots Dzor)
- Coordinates: 39.6683°N 45.3444°E

Site history
- Built: 13th century
- Built by: Prince Prosh Khaghbakian

Proshaberd (Armenian: Պռոշաբերդ, also Boloraberd) is a fortress built in the 13th century by Prince Prosh Khaghbakian. It is located about 7 kilometres (4 mi) northeast of the town of Vernashen in the Vayots Dzor Province of Armenia. It is located about one kilometre east of the 14th-century Spitakavor Monastery.

== Name ==
The fortress is called Proshaberd (or Proshi Berd) after its founder Prosh Khaghbakian. Its other name, Boloraberd, is composed of the words bolor 'round' and berd 'fortress'.

== Location and description ==
The fortress is located the conical peak of a high mountain called Takyadonduran about 7–8 kilometres (4–5 mi) northeast of the village of Vernashen in the Vayots Dzor Province of Armenia. It occupies an area of about 1–1.5 hectares. Its walls are basalt and had defensive towers, the remains of which are still visible. Also visible are traces of the fortress's water pipe. The structures within the fortress's walls are all ruined and buried under a thick layer of soil. A chapel is located on its eastern side.

== History ==
The fortress was built by Prosh Khaghbakian, an Armenian prince of the Khaghbakian or Proshian dynasty, in the 13th century. It served as the prince's seat.
