= Tanahat Monastery =

Monastery in Vayots Dzor Province, Armenia

Tanahat
- View on the Tanahat Monastery in 2026

- Location within Armenia Location within Vayots Dzor

Religion
- Affiliation: Armenian Apostolic Church

Location
- Location: Vernashen, Vayots Dzor Province, Armenia
- Coordinates: 39.78048°N 45.39910°E

Architecture
- Style: Armenian
- Completed: 8th–13th century

Tanahat Monastery (Armenian: Թանահատի վանք), is an 8th-century monastery 7 km south-east of Vernashen village in the Vayots Dzor Province of Armenia. It was built between the 8th and 13th centuries. The monastery was also called the Red Monastery because it was built of red stone. Tanahat monastery was built on the site of a pagan temple, which was dedicated to the Armenian goddess Anahit. A Christian temple was founded here in the 5th century. The early medieval cemetery is scattered next to the monastery. Tanahat Monastery functioned until the late Middle Ages and is now in good condition. According to the historian Stepanos Archbishop Orbelyan, in 735 the body of Stepanos Syunetsi was buried in Tanade monastery and a small chapel was built over the grave.

In 1273–1279, on the place of the chapel, under the patronage of Prince Prosh and his family, with the help of the local residents, the church of St. Stepanos was built with dark bluish basalt hewn stones. An inscription on the Saint Stepanos church says that it was constructed "during the rule of the valiant and illustrious Prince Prosh and his sons Papak', Hasan, and the child Eacci", around 1273-79.

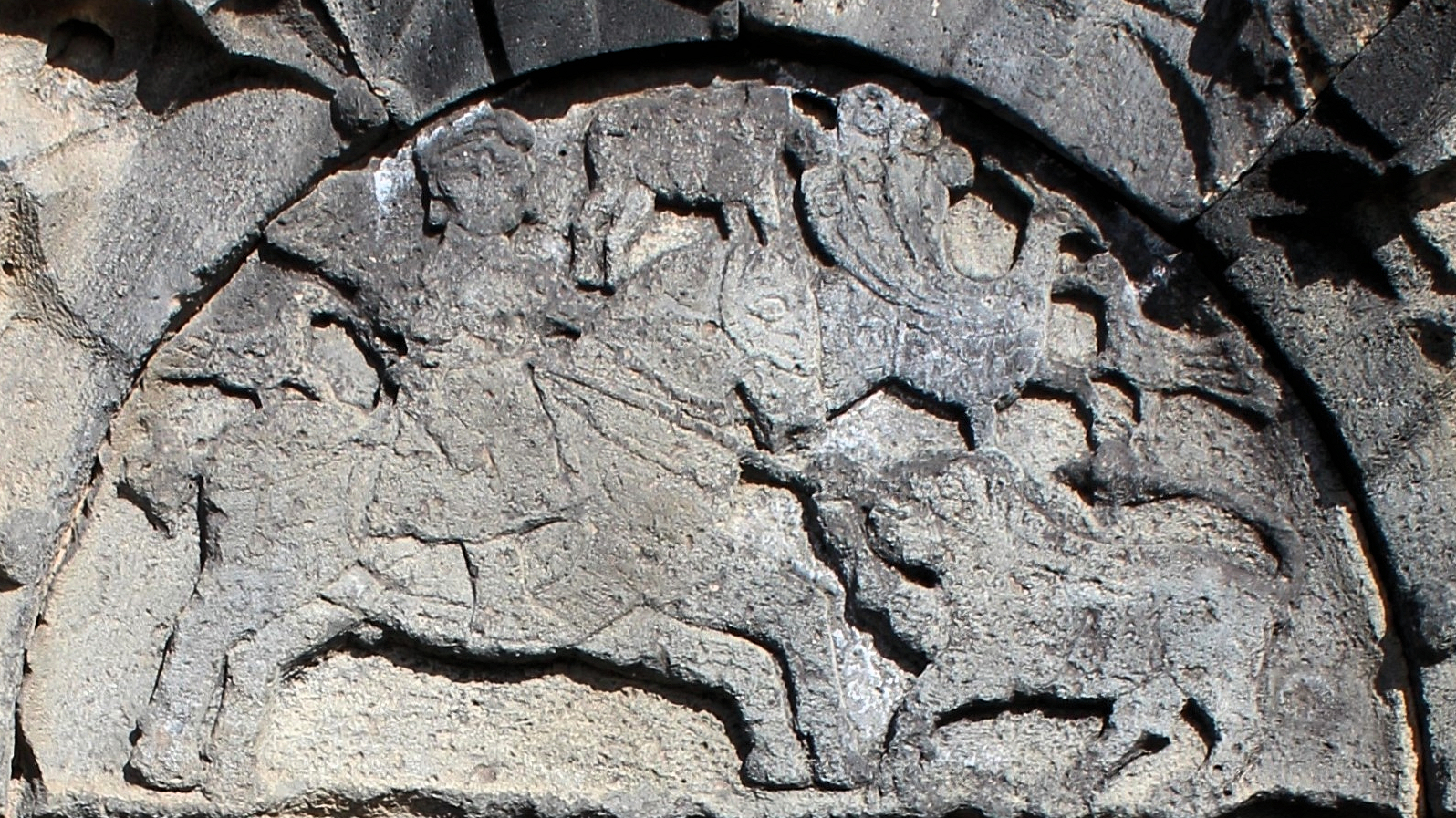
Hunting scene at Tanahat Monastery
