= Bash Kand, Sarab =

Bash Kand باشكند
- Village
- Location within Iran
- Coordinates: 37°55′18″N 47°53′16″E
- Country: Iran
- Province: East Azerbaijan
- County: Sarab
- Bakhsh: Central
- Rural District: Sain

Population (2006)
  - Total: 136
- Time zone: UTC+3:30 (IRST)
  - Summer (DST): UTC+4:30 (IRDT)

Bash Kand (Persian: باشكند, also Romanized as Bāsh Kand) is a village in Sain Rural District, in the Central District of Sarab County, East Azerbaijan Province, Iran. At the 2006 census, its population was 136, in 26 families.
