= Başköy =

Başköy may refer to:

- Başköy, Kurucaşile, a village in the District of Kurucaşile, Bartın Province, Turkey
- Başköy, Arhavi, a village in the District of Arhavi, Artvin Province, Turkey
- Başköy, Bilecik, a village in the District of Bilecik, Bilecik Province, Turkey
- Başköy, Murgul, a village in the District of Murgul, Artvin Province, Turkey
- Başköy, Çıldır, a village in the District of Çıldır, Ardahan Province, Turkey
- Başköy, Alanya, a village in the District of Alanya, Antalya Province, Turkey
- Başköy, Antalya, a village in the District of Antalya, Antalya Province, Turkey
- Başköy, Cide, a village in Cide
- Başköy, Bismil
- Başköy, Çat
- Başköy, Çayırlı
- Başköy, Dicle
- Başköy, Hınıs
- Başköy, İspir
- Başköy, Kargı
- Başköy, Nilüfer
- Başköy, Orhaneli
- Başköy, Pınarbaşı, a village

== See also ==
- Başkənd (disambiguation)
- Bashkend (disambiguation)
