= Bashkand, Bostanabad =

Bashkand باشكند
- Village
- Location within Iran
- Coordinates: 37°47′20″N 47°06′18″E
- Country: Iran
- Province: East Azerbaijan
- County: Bostanabad
- Bakhsh: Tekmeh Dash
- Rural District: Abbas-e Gharbi

Population (2006)
  - Total: 273
- Time zone: UTC+3:30 (IRST)
  - Summer (DST): UTC+4:30 (IRDT)

Bashkand (Persian: باشكند, also Romanized as Bāshkand and Bāsh Kand) is a village in Abbas-e Gharbi Rural District, Tekmeh Dash District, Bostanabad County, East Azerbaijan Province, Iran. At the 2006 census, its population was 273, in 53 families.
