= Başkənd, Nakhchivan =

Village and municipality in Ordubad, Nakhchivan, Azerbaijan

Başkənd
- Municipality
- Location within Azerbaijan
- Coordinates: 38°58′N 45°56′E
- Country: Azerbaijan
- Autonomous republic: Nakhchivan
- District: Ordubad

Population (2005)
  - Total: 415
- Time zone: UTC+4 (AZT)

Başkənd (also, Bashkand and Bashkend; until 2003, Disar and Disər) is a village and municipality in the Ordubad District of Nakhchivan, Azerbaijan. It is located in the near of the Ordubad-Unus highway, 22 km in the north-west from the district center. Its population is busy with gardening, vegetable-growing, farming, animal husbandry. There are secondary school, club, library and a medical center in the village. It has a population of 415.

== Etymology ==
The name of the Başkənd (Bashkend) village made out from the components of Turkic words of baş (major, main, great) and kənd (village, place of residence) means "the center, the main settlement, above, the village at the height". In the Armenia, till 1946 the name of the villages of Vernashen and Gegharkunik, till 1978 the name of the village of Artsvashen were Başkənd.

== Monuments ==
There was an Armenian church in the village, St. Gevorg Church, which was destroyed by February 2000.

== See also ==
- St. Gevorg Church (Disar)
