= Başkənd, Khojaly =

Başkənd
- Location within Azerbaijan Location within Karabakh Economic Region
- Coordinates: 39°48′17″N 46°39′47″E
- Country: Azerbaijan
- District: Khojaly
- Time zone: UTC+4 (AZT)

Başkənd (also, Bashkand and Bashkend) is a ghost village in the Khojaly District of Azerbaijan. Prior to the 2023 Azerbaijani offensive, it was de facto controlled by the Republic of Artsakh.
