= Vernashen =

Vernashen Վերնաշեն
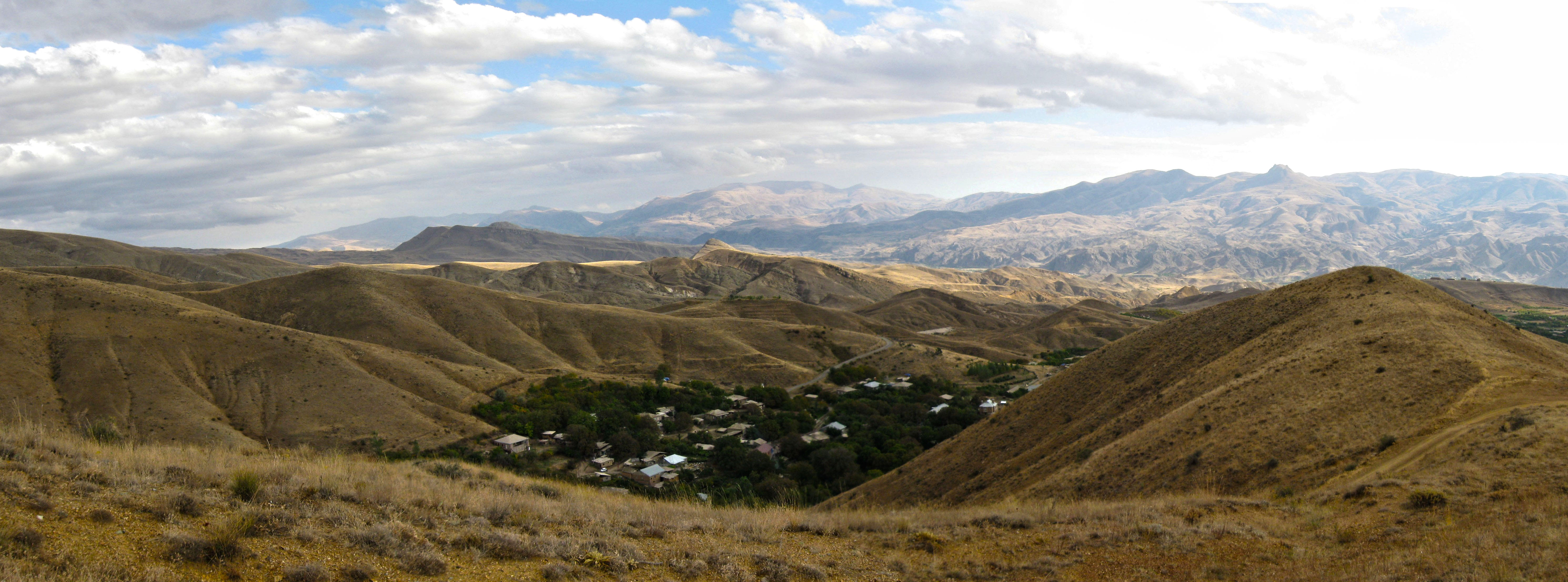

- Location within Armenia Location within Vayots Dzor
- Coordinates: 39°47′38″N 45°21′48″E
- Country: Armenia
- Province: Vayots Dzor
- Municipality: Yeghegnadzor

Population (2011)
  - Total: 1,113
- Time zone: UTC+4 (AMT)

Vernashen (Armenian: Վերնաշեն) is a village in the Yeghegnadzor Municipality of the Vayots Dzor Province in Armenia. The 13th-century fortress of Proshaberd (also known as Boloraberd) and the Spitakavor Monastery of 1321 are located near Vernashen.

== Toponymy ==
The village was previously known as Bashkend.

== Gallery ==
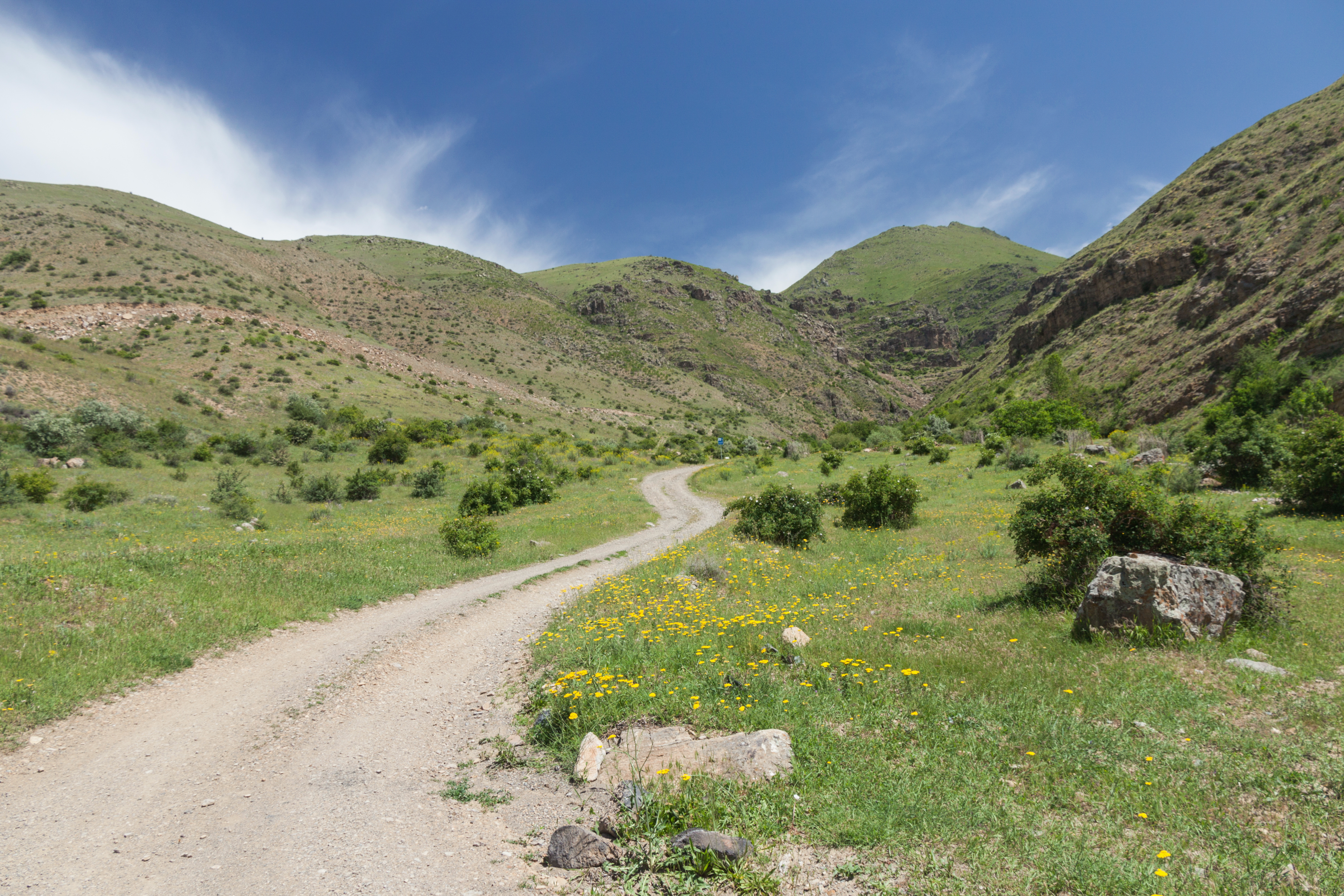
Nature along the tourist route Vernashen - Spitakavor

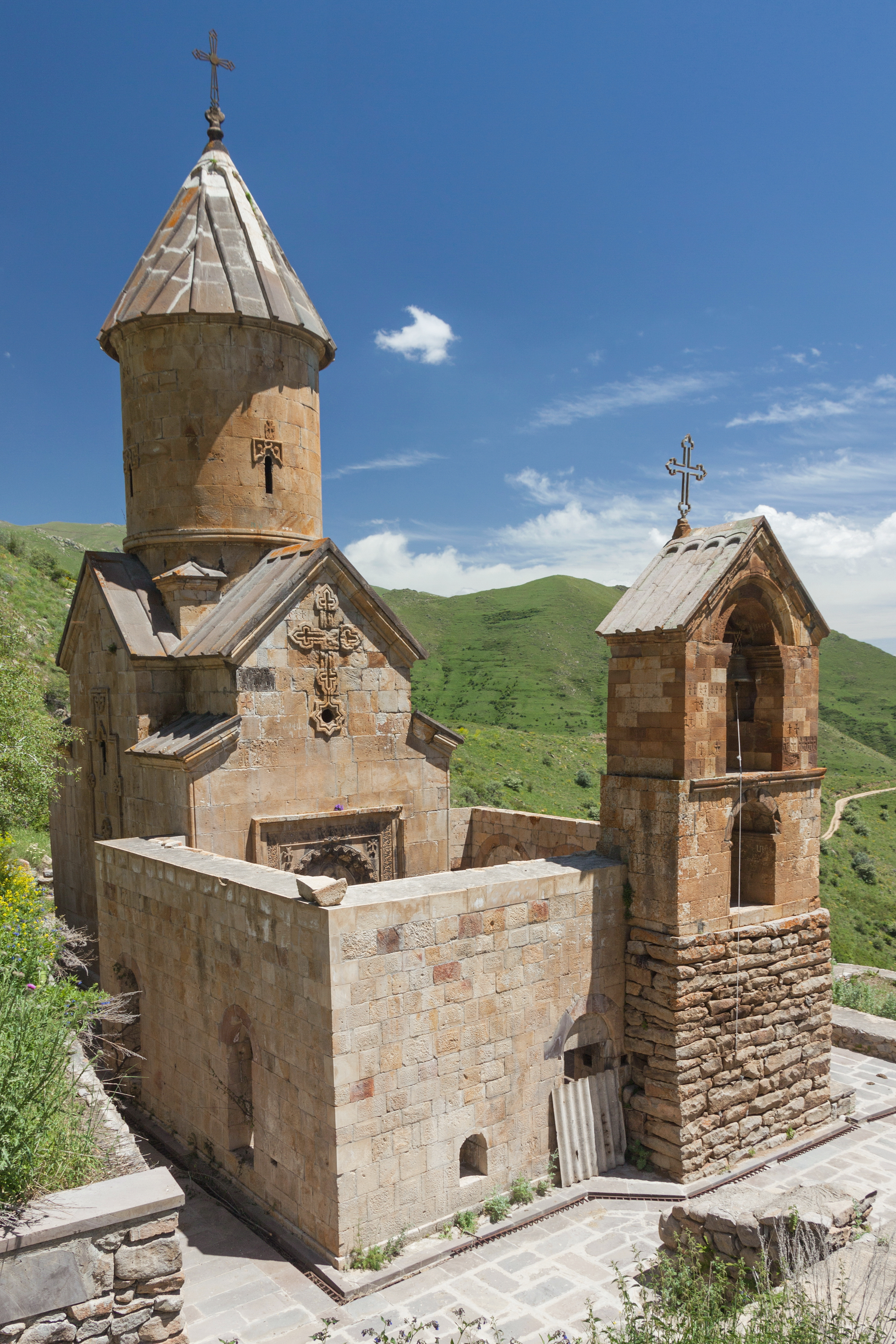
Spitakavor Monastery of 1321 near Vernashen

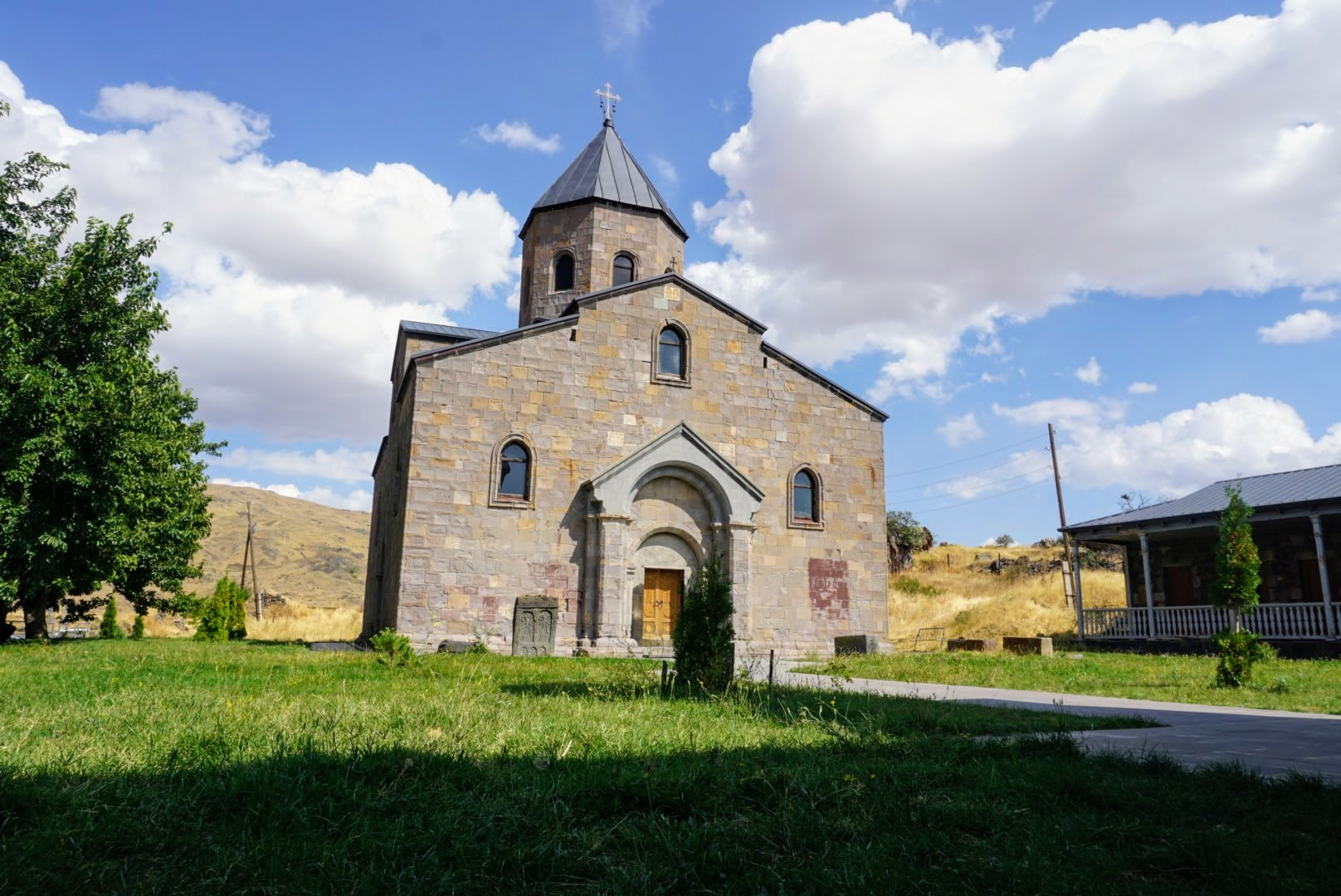
Arkazi Surb Khach

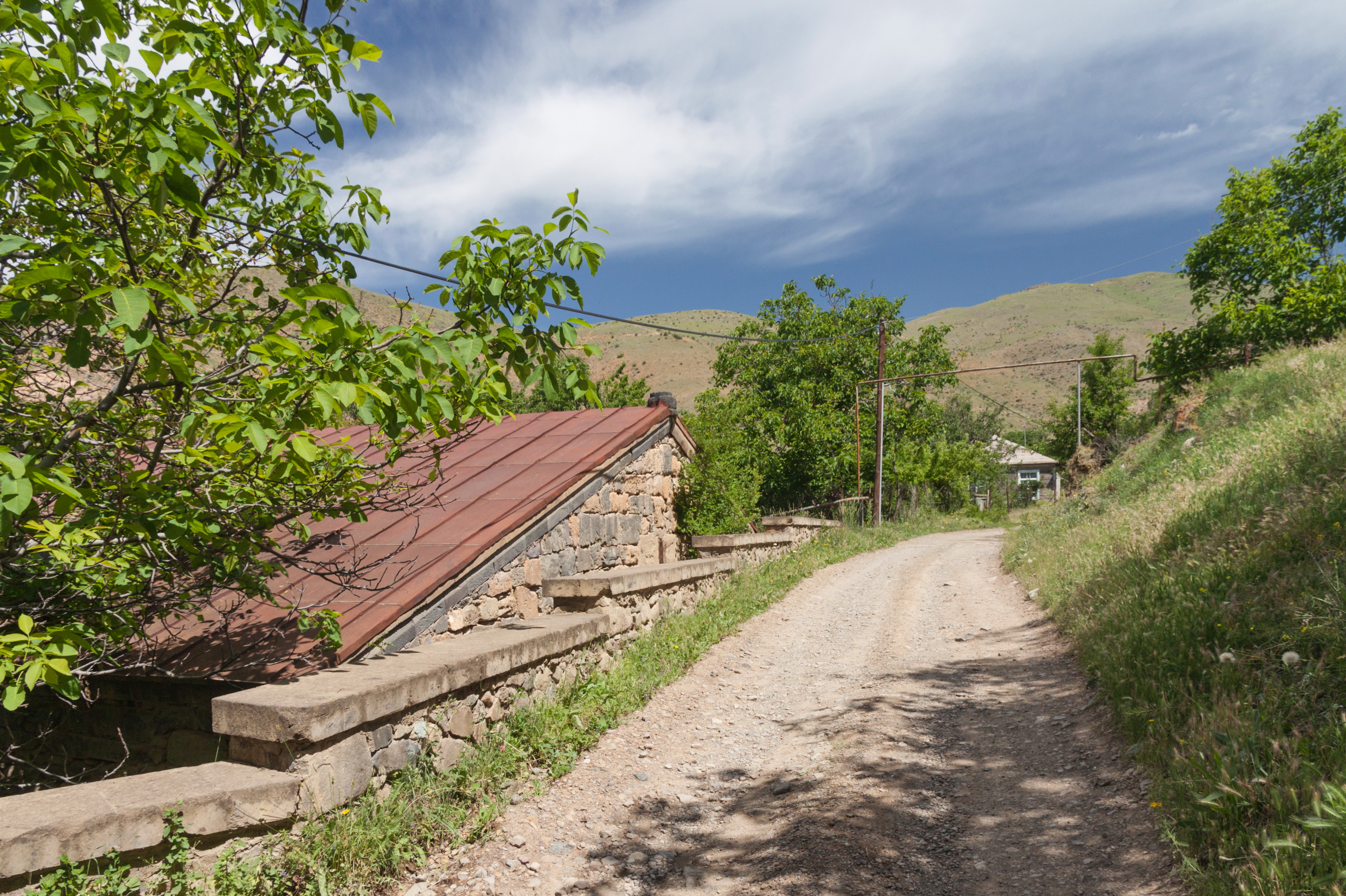
The road through the village towards the Spitakavor monastery

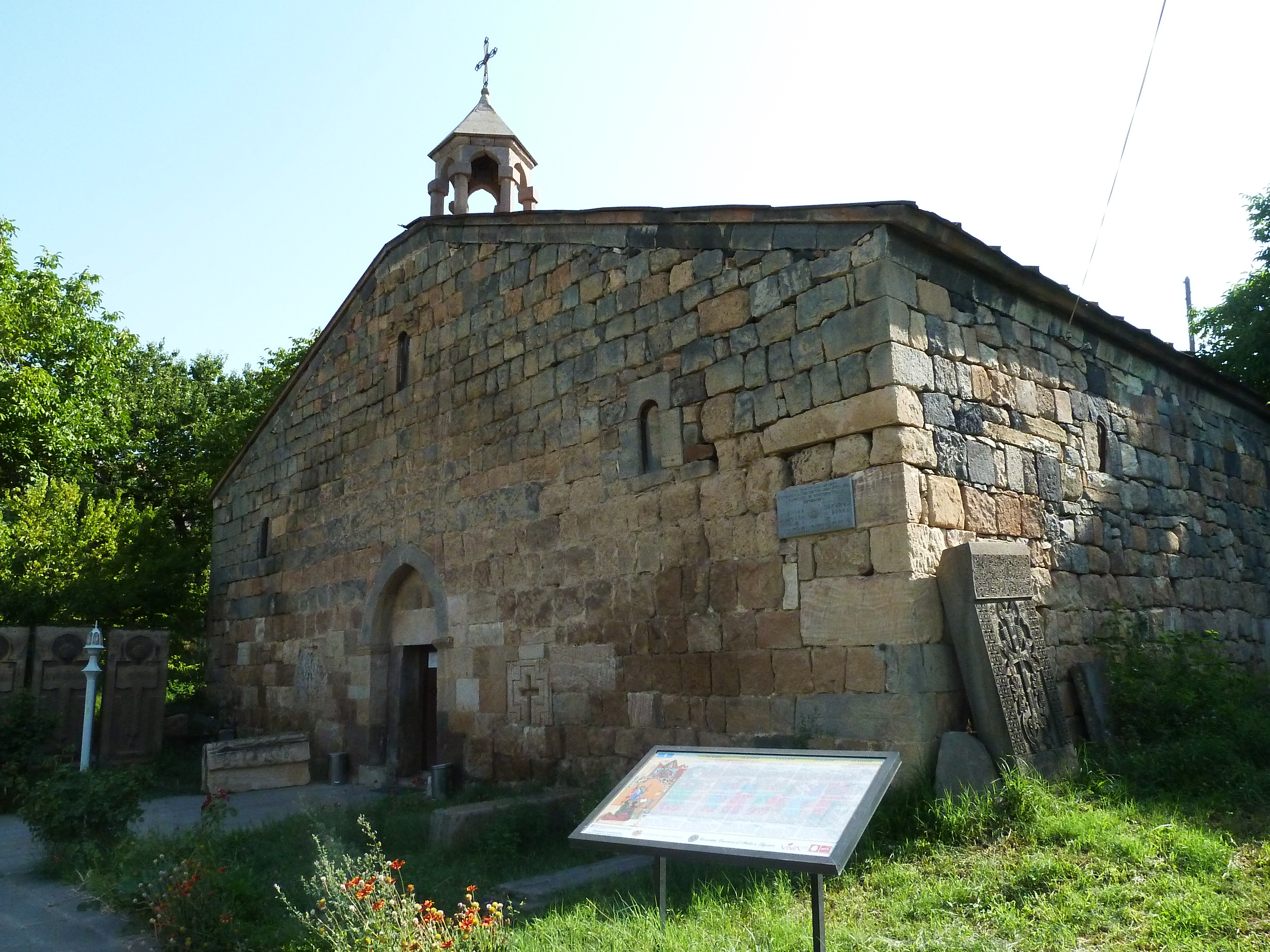
Surp Hakob church of Vernashen

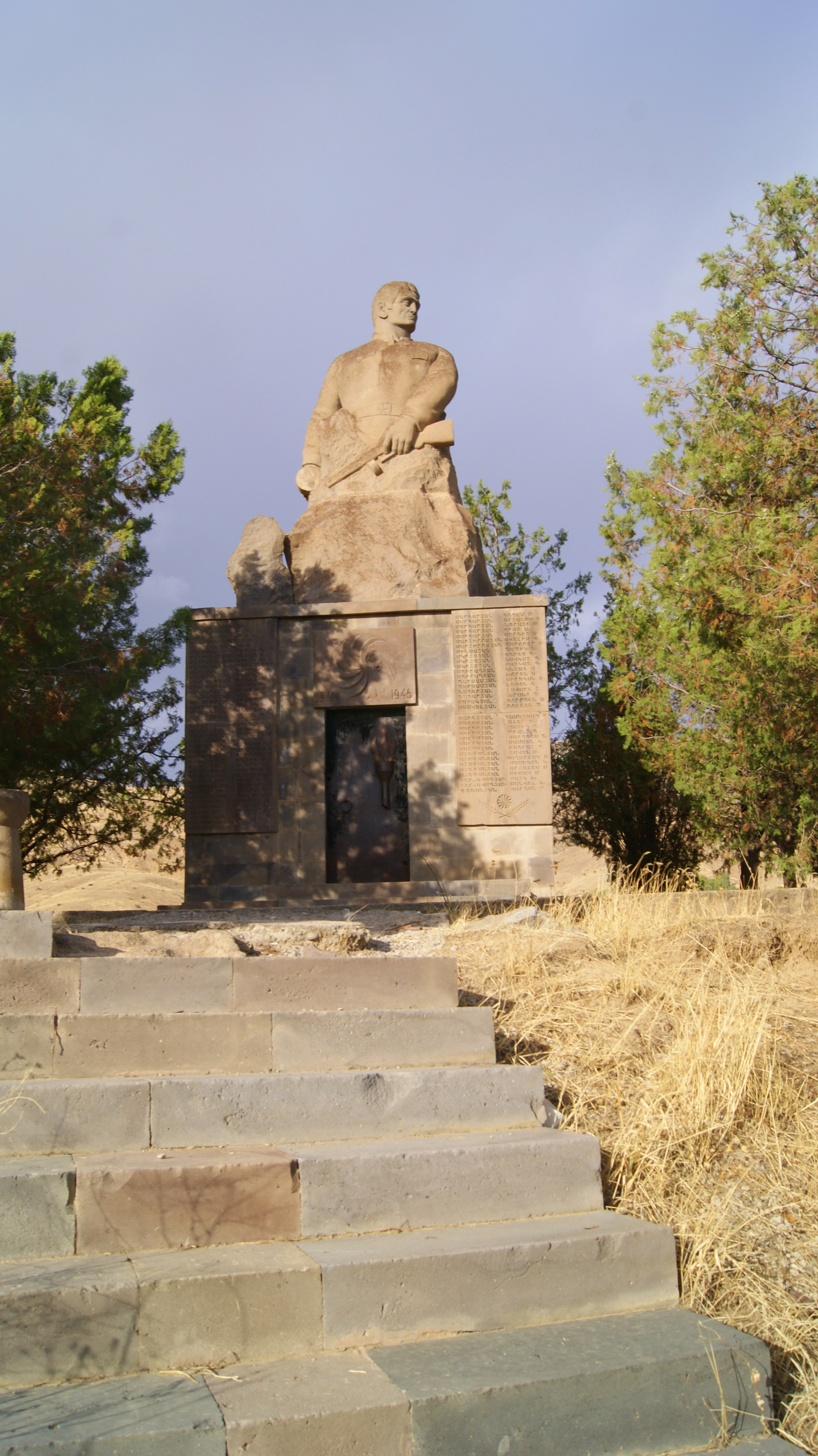
WWII monument

Tanahat Monastery
