= Gndevaz =

Gndevaz Գնդեվազ
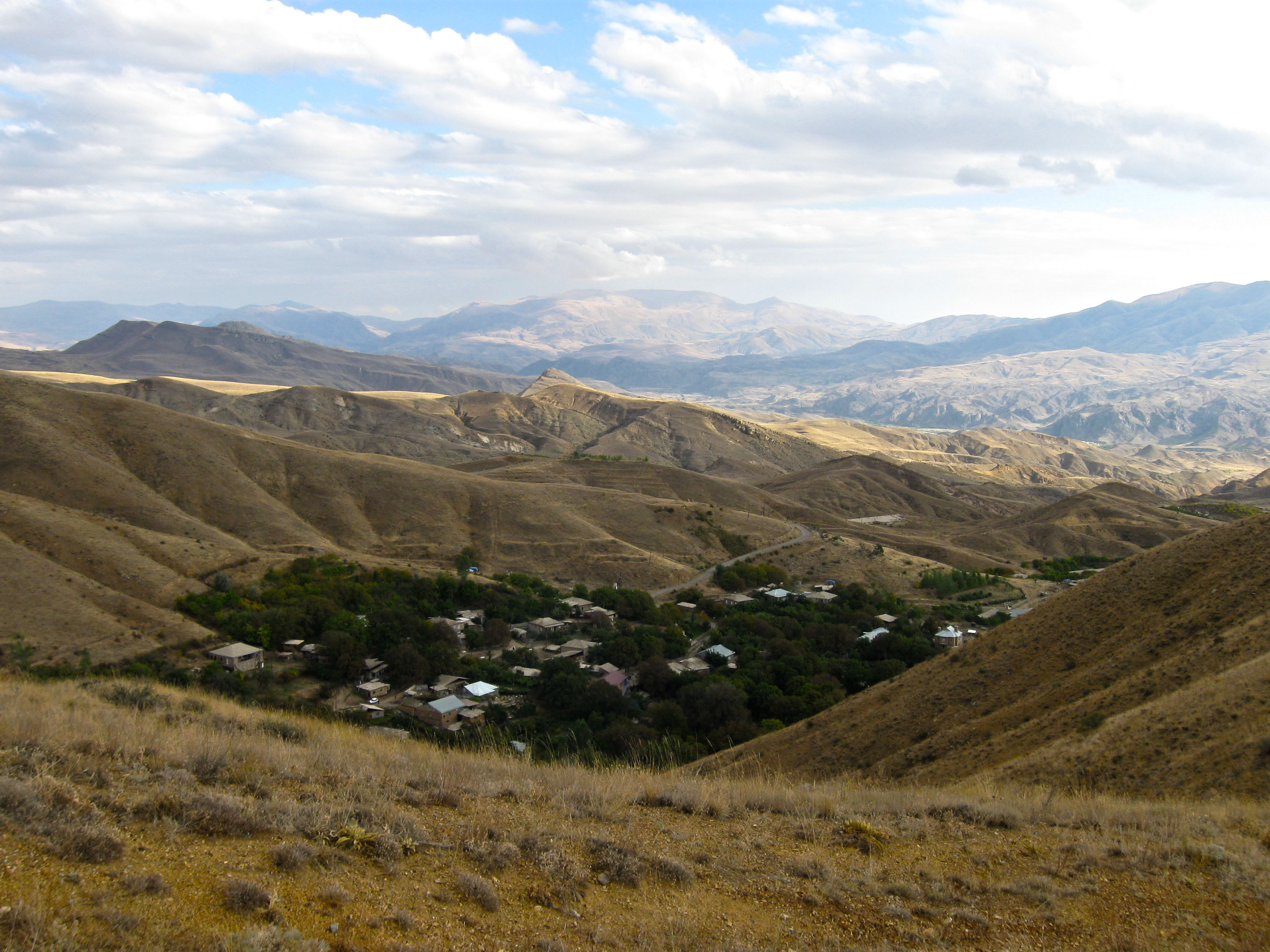

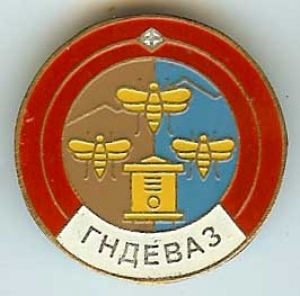
- Coat of arms

- Location within Armenia Location within Vayots Dzor
- Coordinates: 39°45′33″N 45°37′05″E
- Country: Armenia
- Province: Vayots Dzor
- Municipality: Jermuk
- Elevation: 1,750 m (5,740 ft)

Population (2011)
  - Total: 829
- Time zone: UTC+4 (AMT)

Gndevaz (Armenian: Գնդեվազ) is a village in the Jermuk Municipality of the Vayots Dzor Province of Armenia.

== Historical heritage sites ==
Historical heritage sites in and around the village include the 10th-century monastery of Gndevank (Armenian: Գնդեվանք), an 11th century water channel, and the church of Surb Astvatsatsin (Armenian: Սուրբ Աստվածածին, lit. 'Holy Mother of God') from 1686.

== Gallery ==
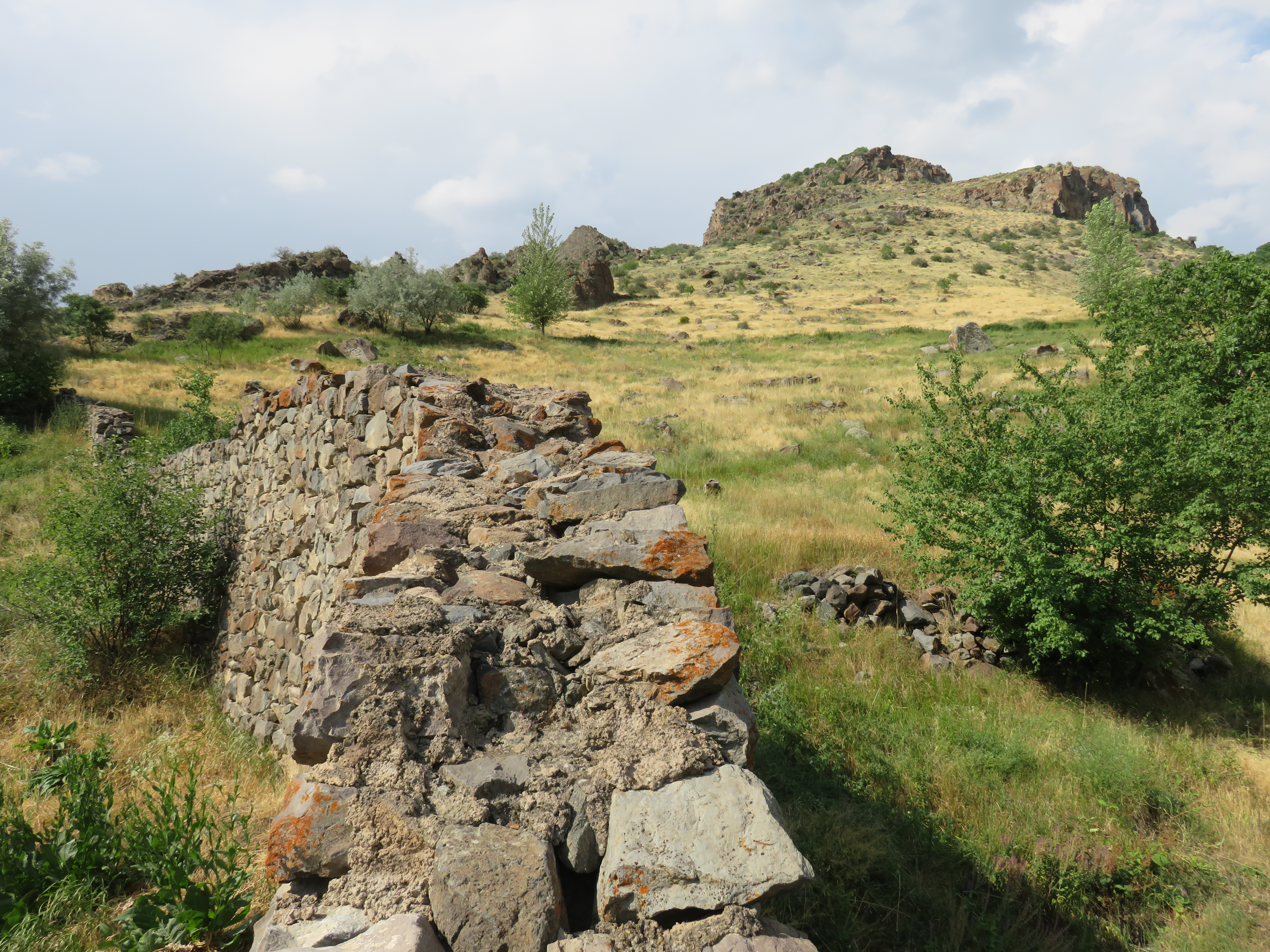
Scenery around Gndevank

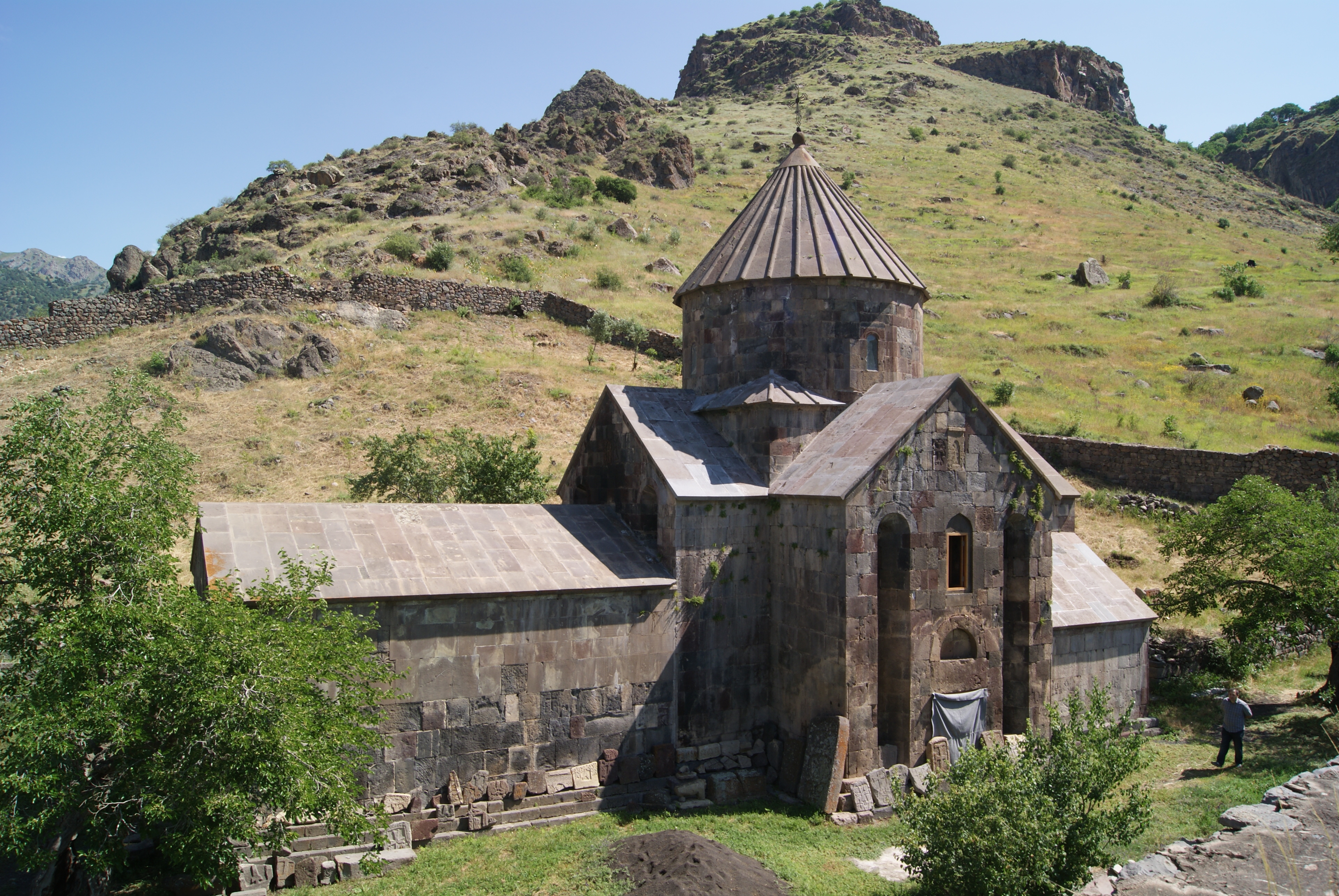
Gndevank

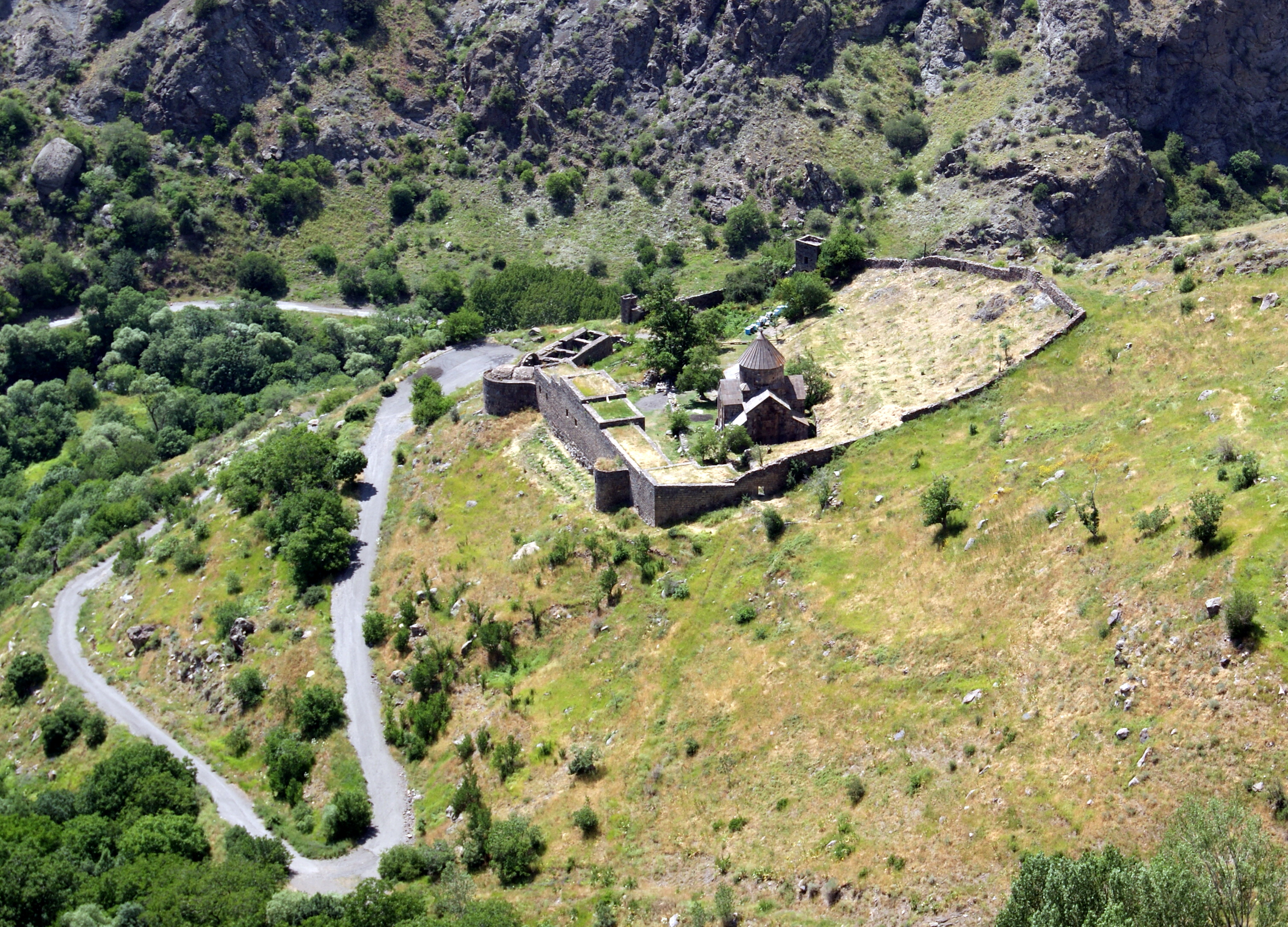
Scenery around Gndevank

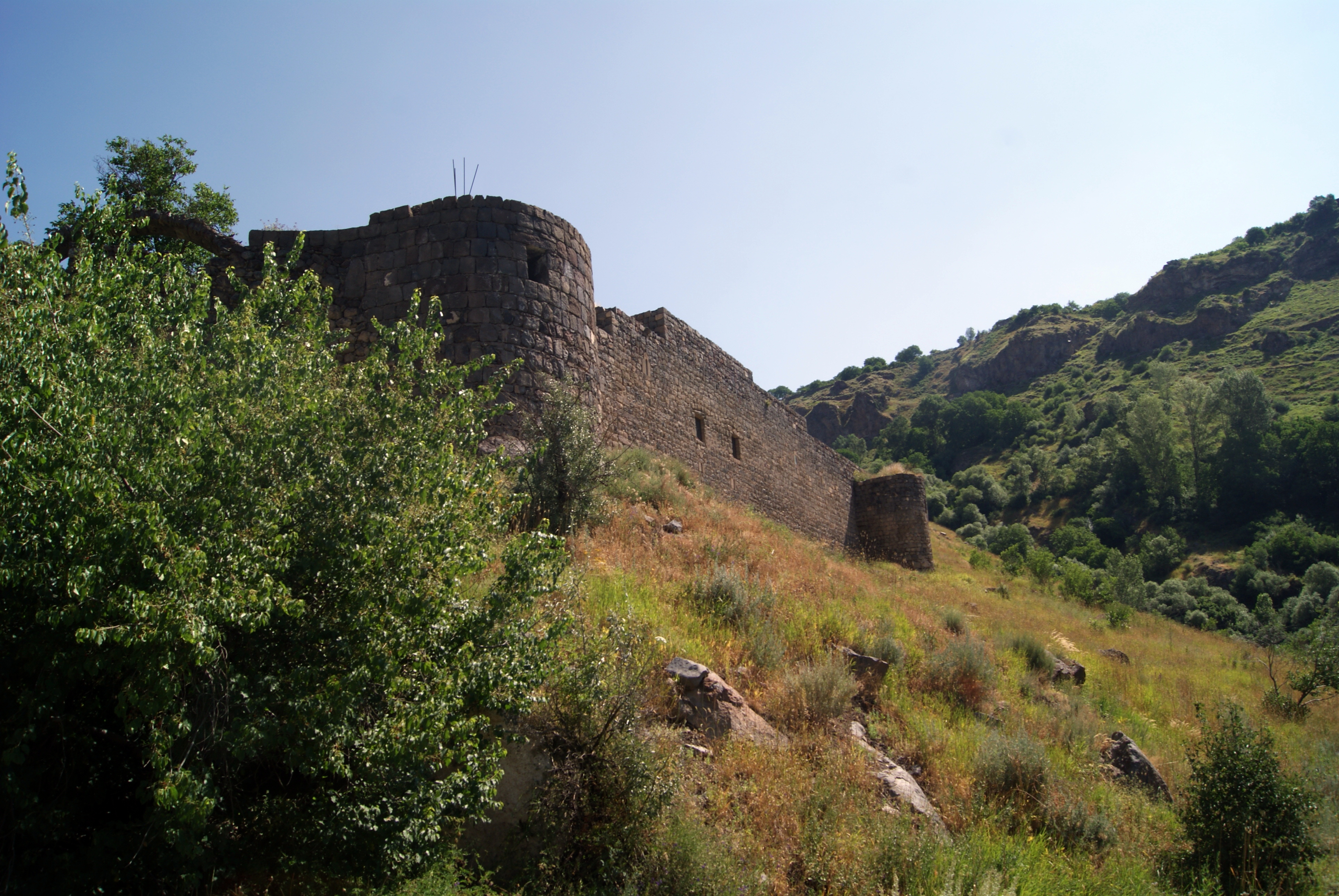
Walls of Gndevank

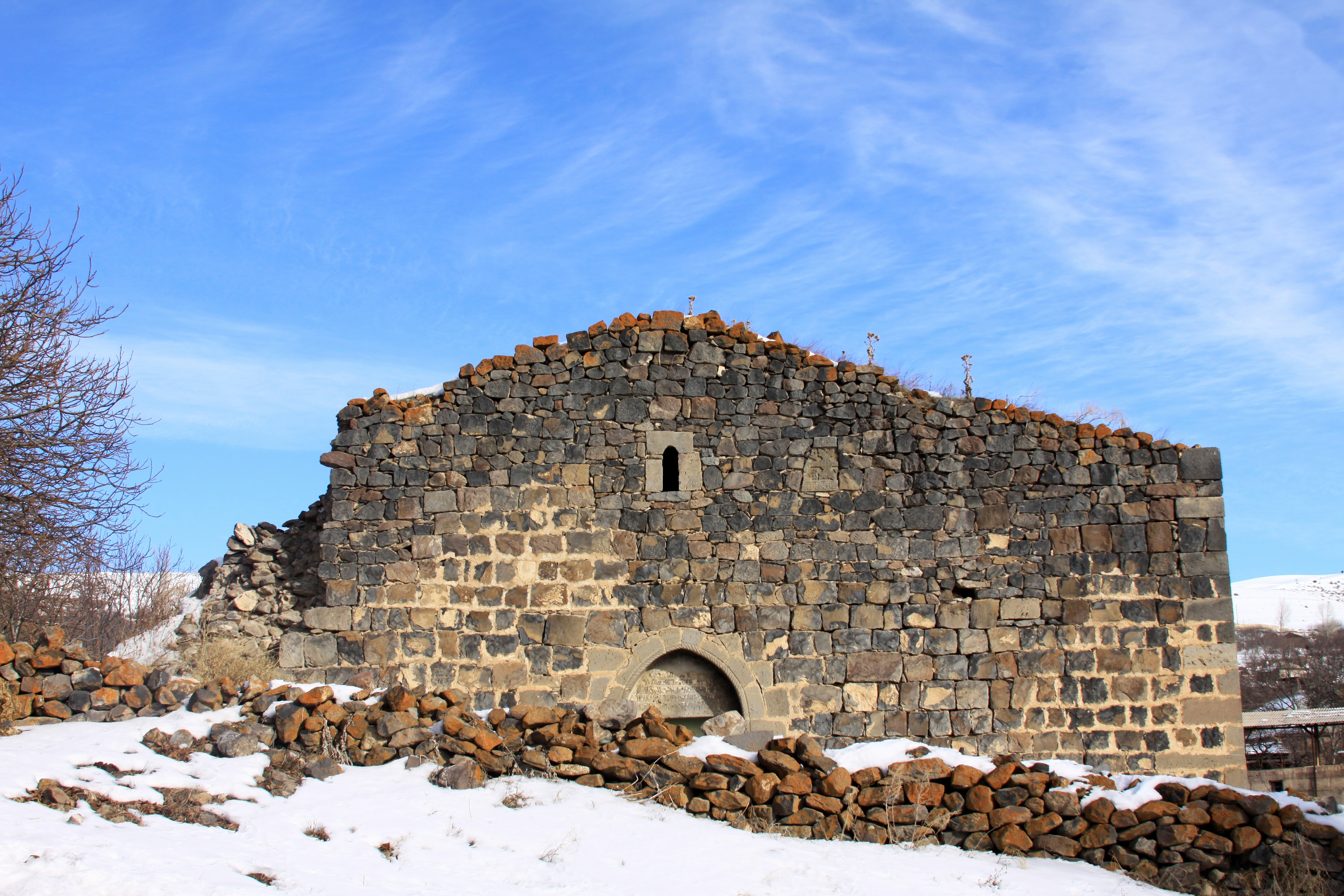
St. Astvatsatsin Church of Gndevaz
