= Kechut =

Kechut Կեչուտ
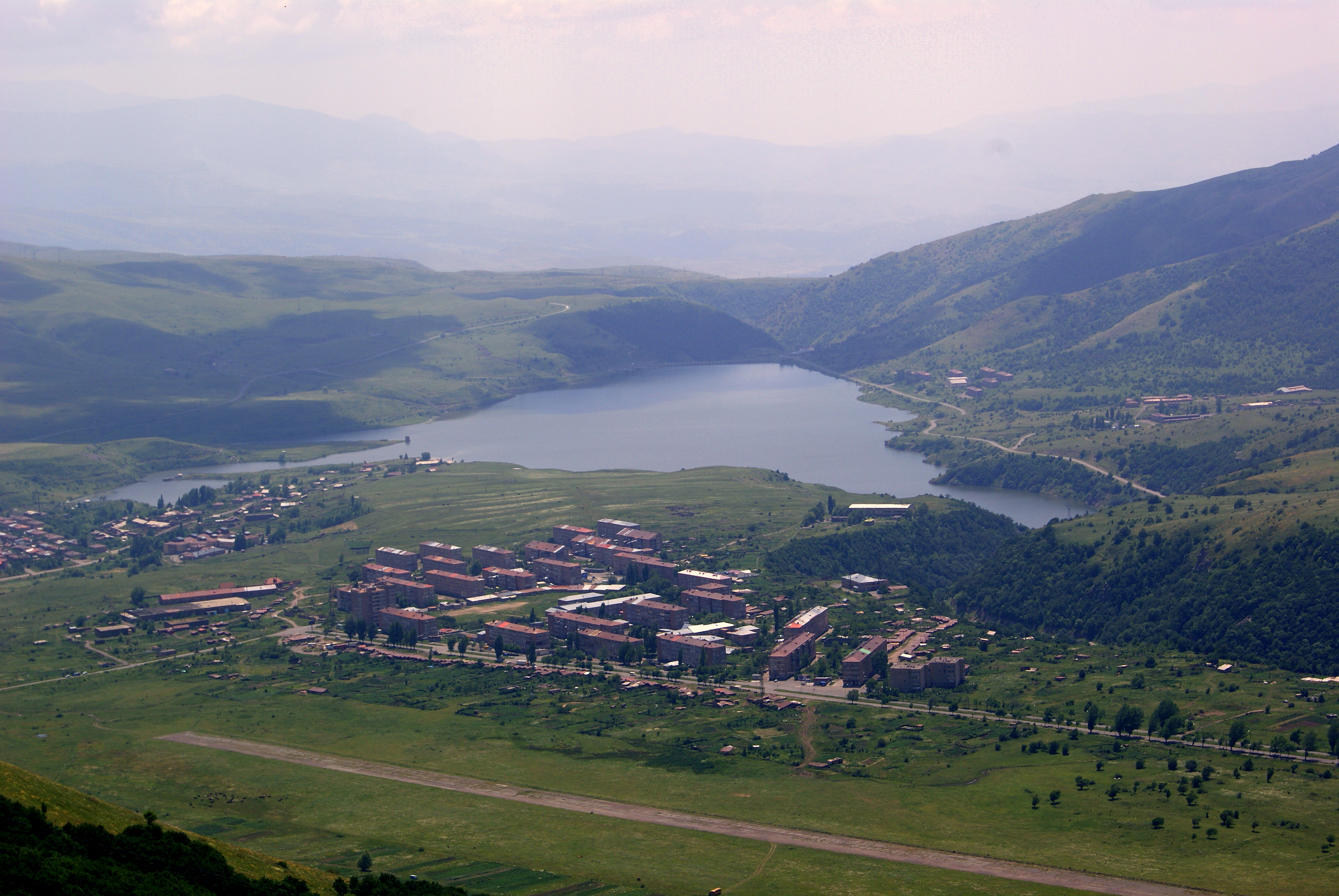

- Location within Armenia Location within Vayots Dzor
- Coordinates: 39°47′58″N 45°39′45″E
- Country: Armenia
- Province: Vayots Dzor
- Municipality: Jermuk

Population (2023)
  - Total: 894
- Time zone: UTC+4 (AMT)

Kechut (Armenian: Կեչուտ) is a village in the Jermuk Municipality of the Vayots Dzor Province of Armenia.

== Toponymy ==
The village was previously known as Kushchi, and Kush-Bilyak.

== Geography ==
The village is located to the immediate south of the town of Jermuk, on the western coast of the Kechut Reservoir which is a section of the Arpa river, as well as at the beginning of the Kechut–Azatek waterway, which is one of the artificial waterways that provide water to Lake Sevan and stabilize its water level.

== Demographics ==
The population in 2023 was 894.

== Gallery ==
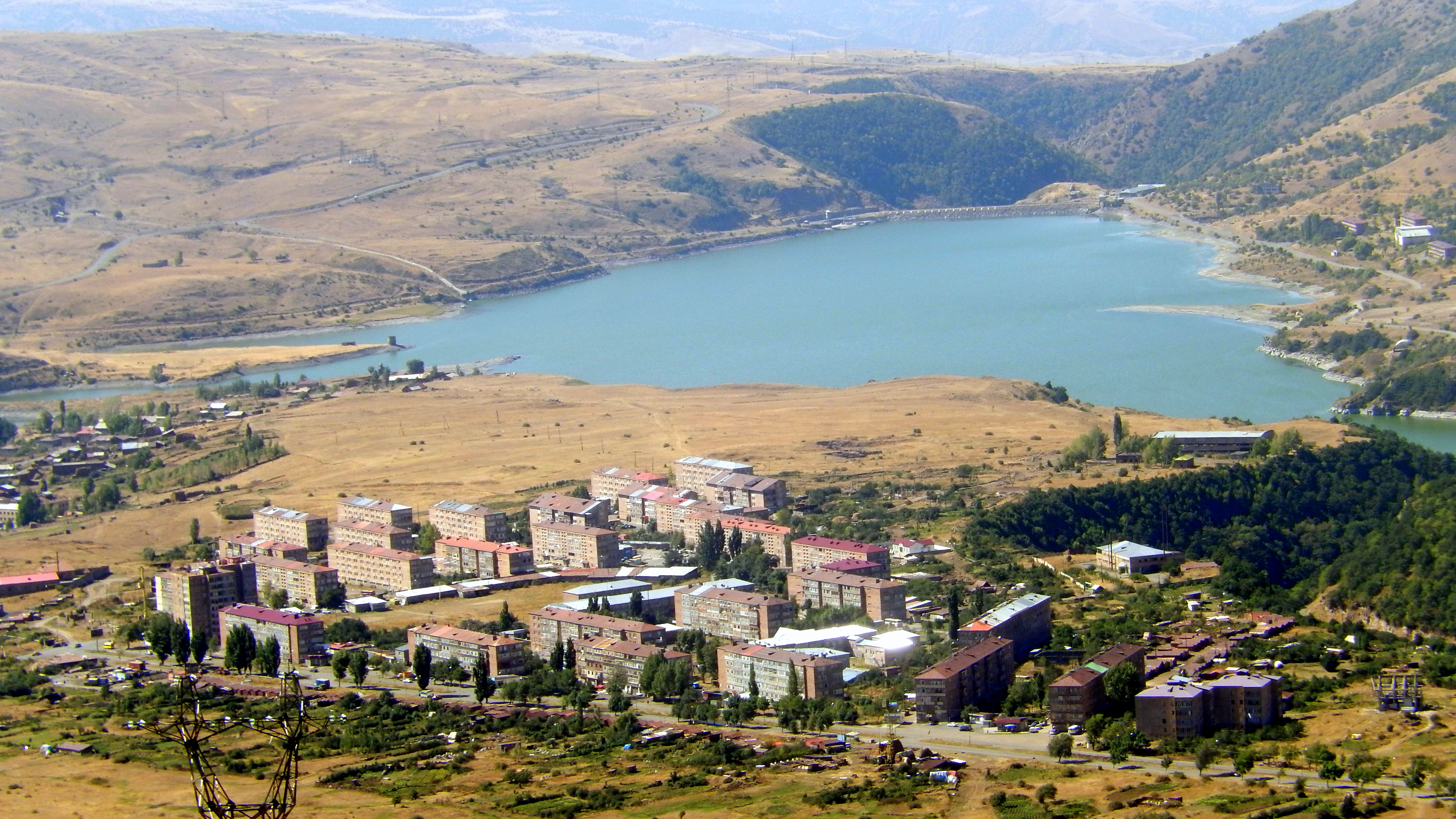

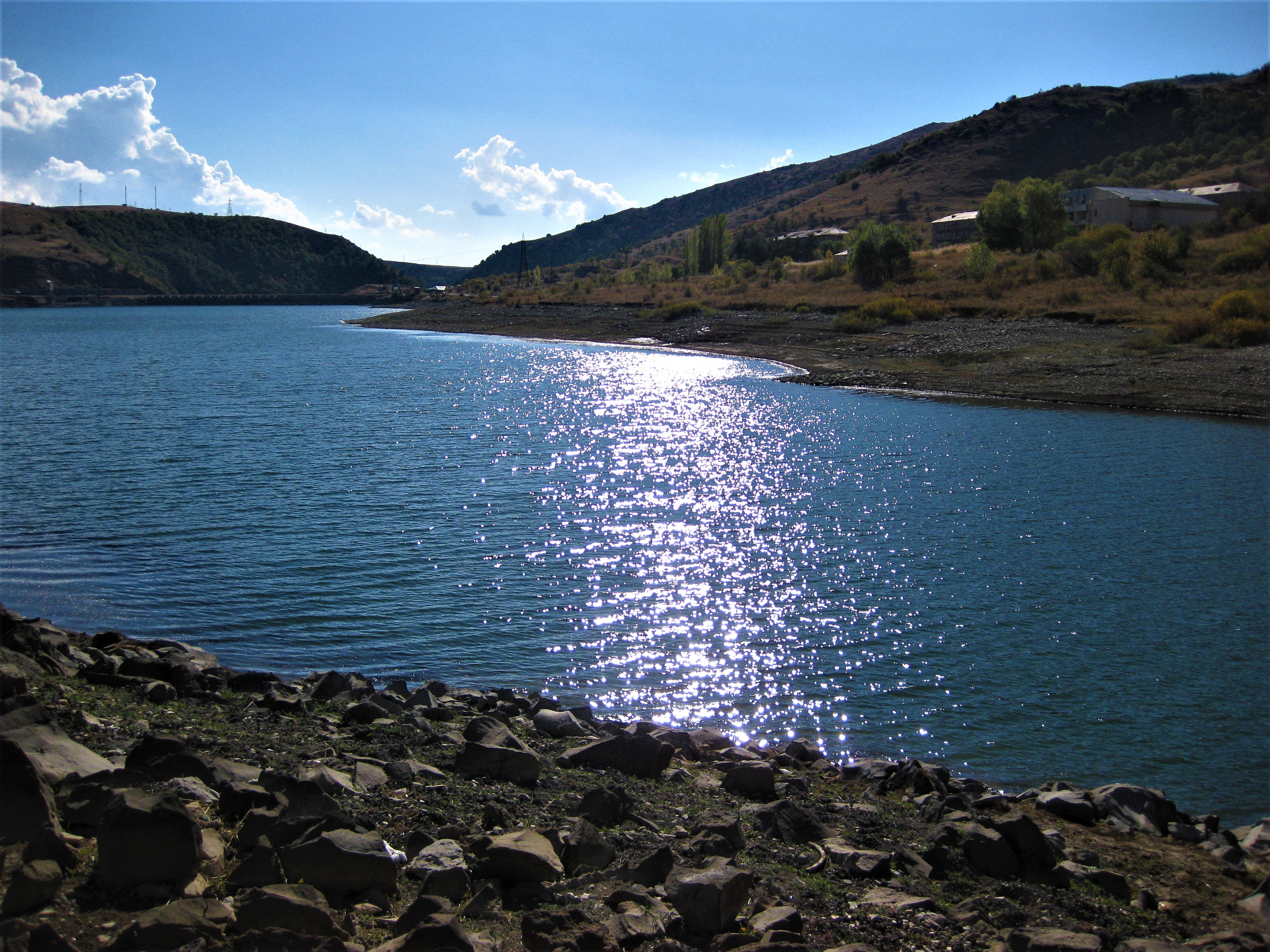

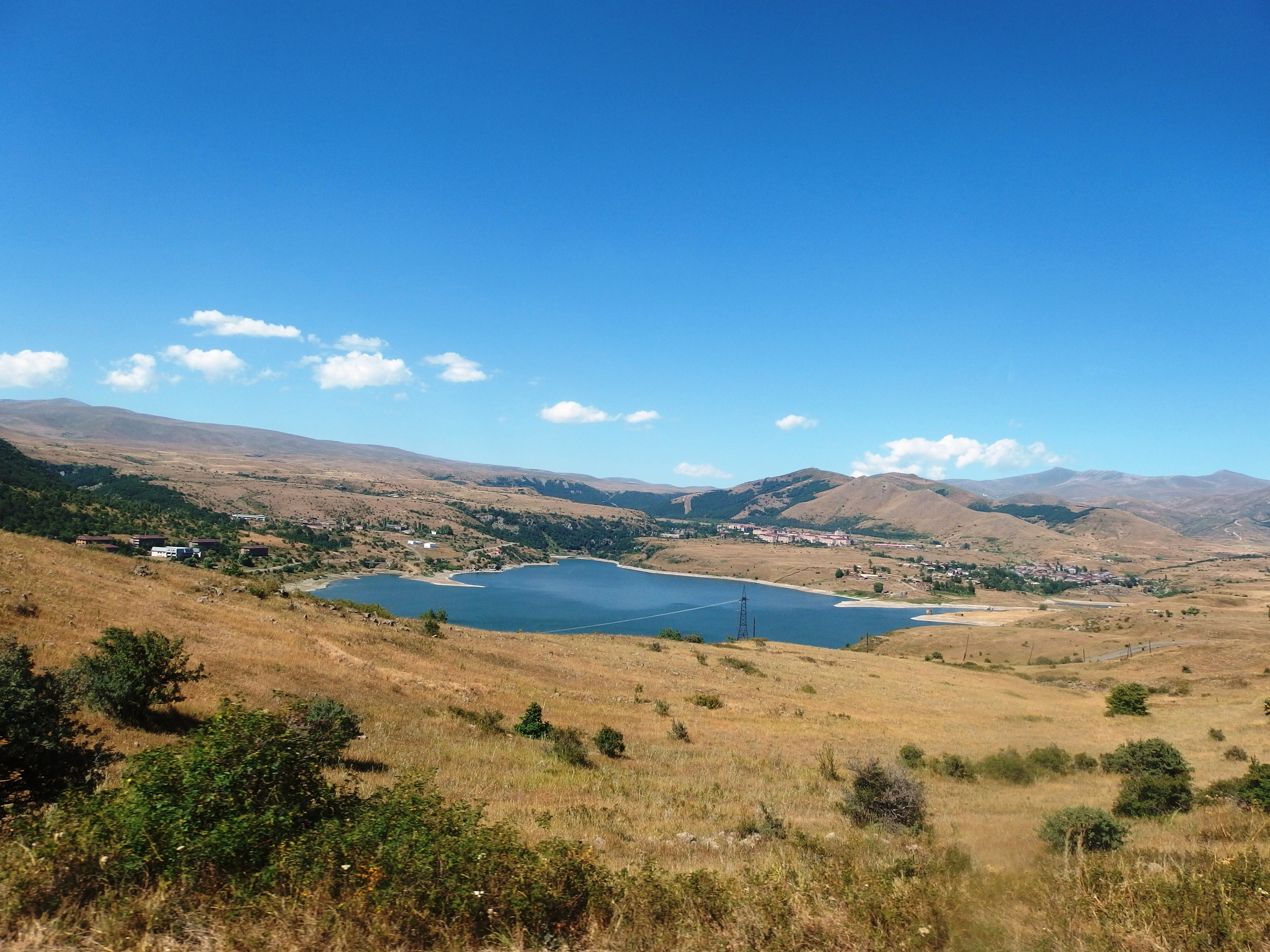

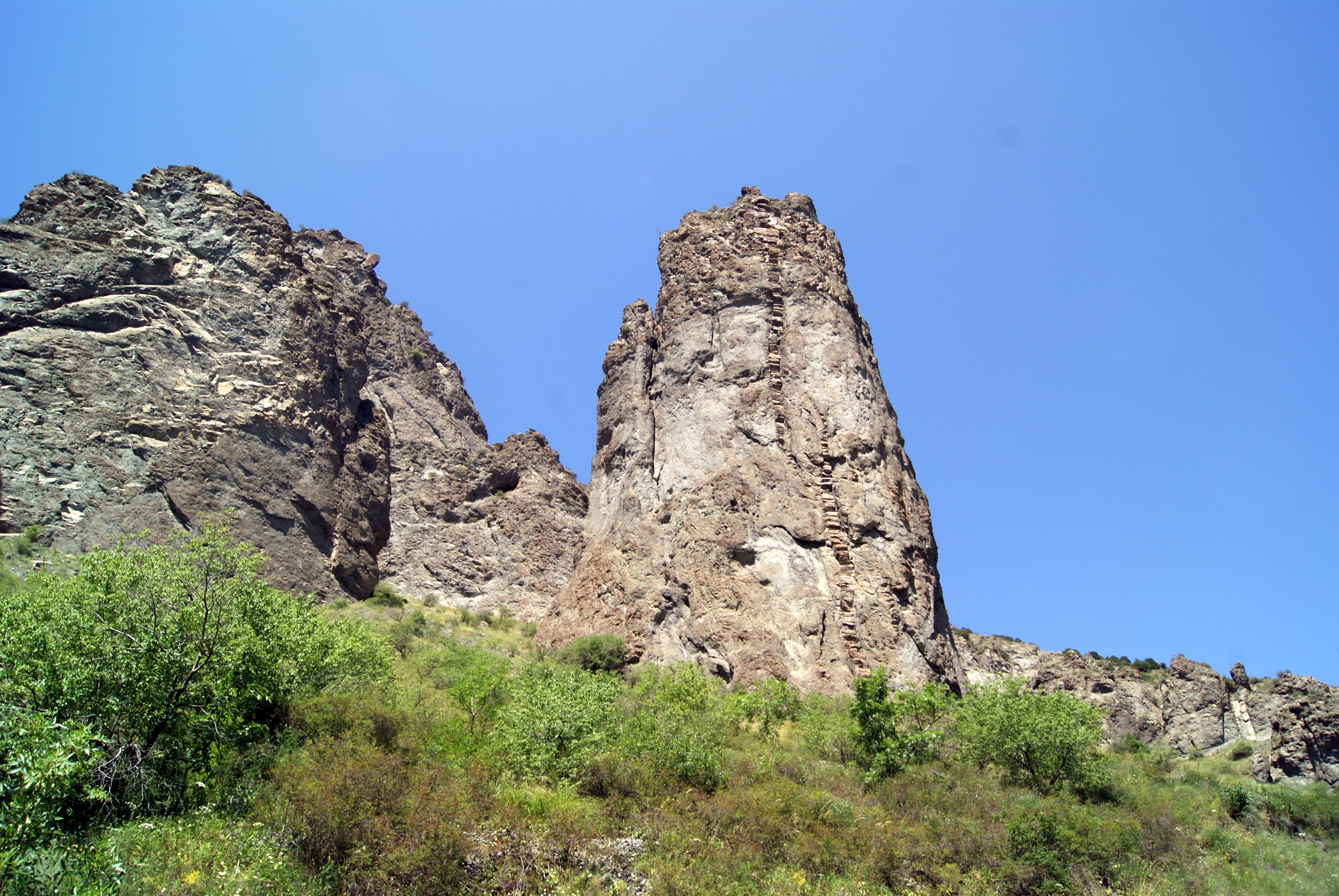

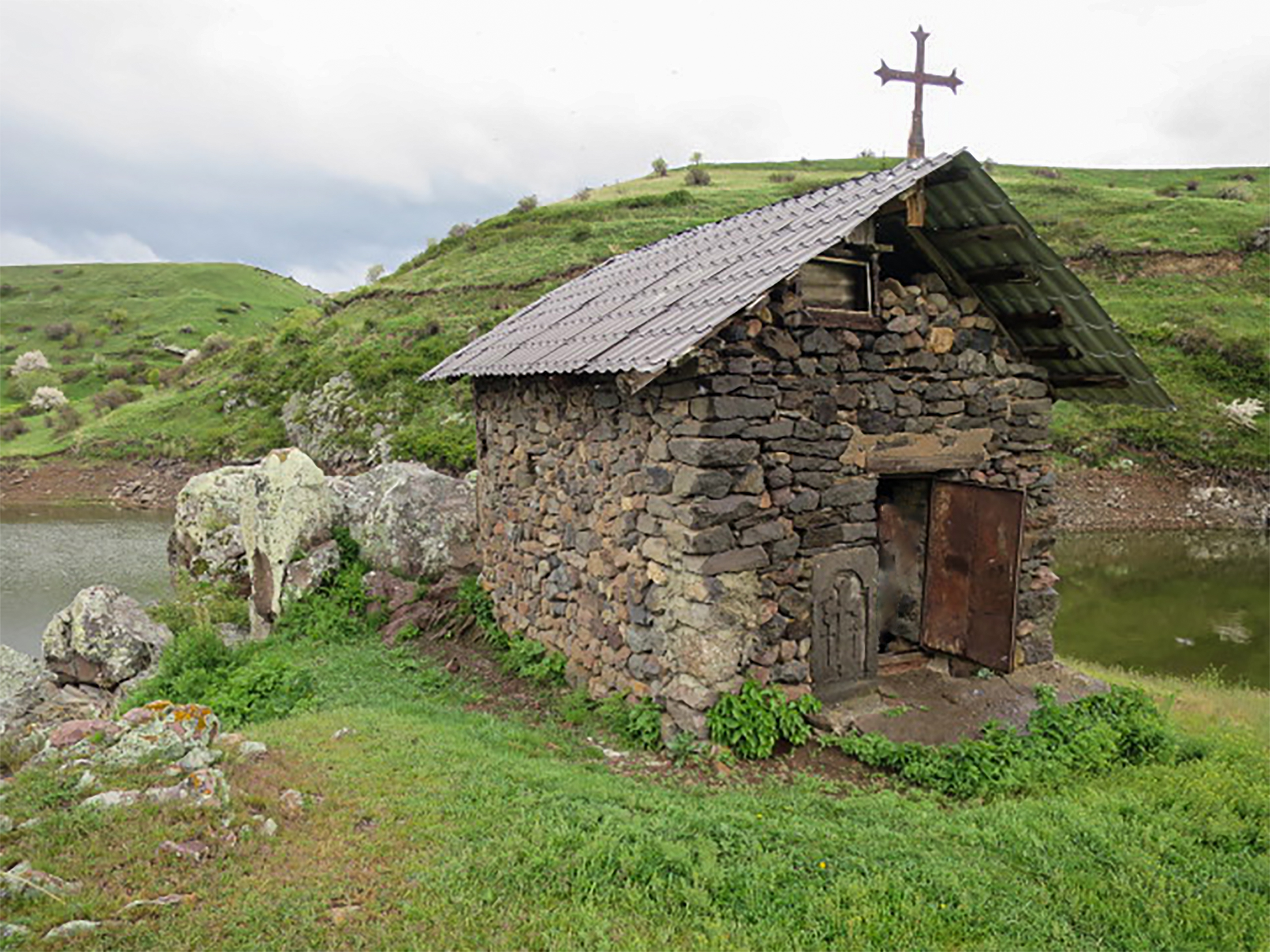

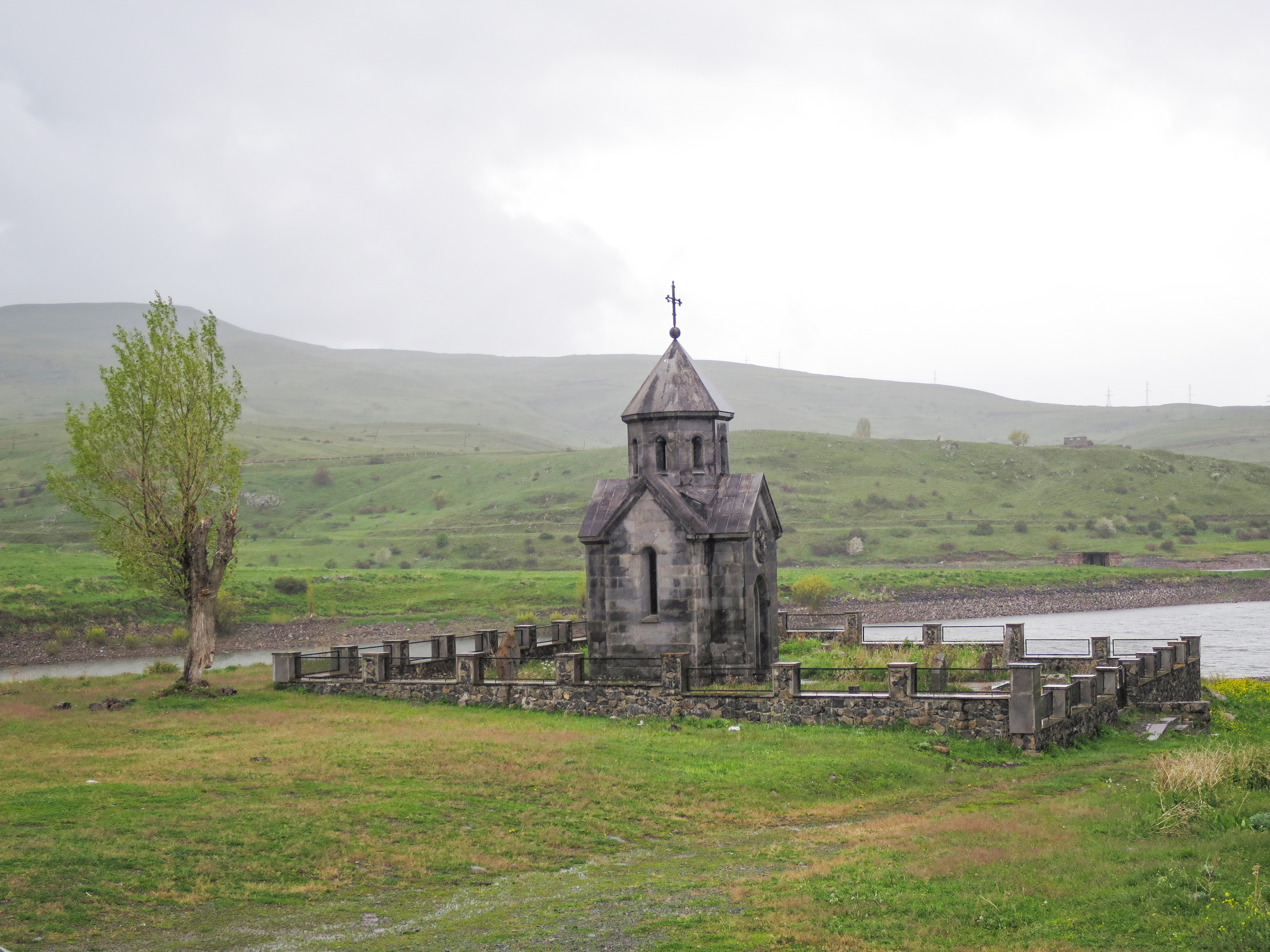
