= Gndevank =

Cultural heritage monument of Armenia

Gndevank Գնդեվանք
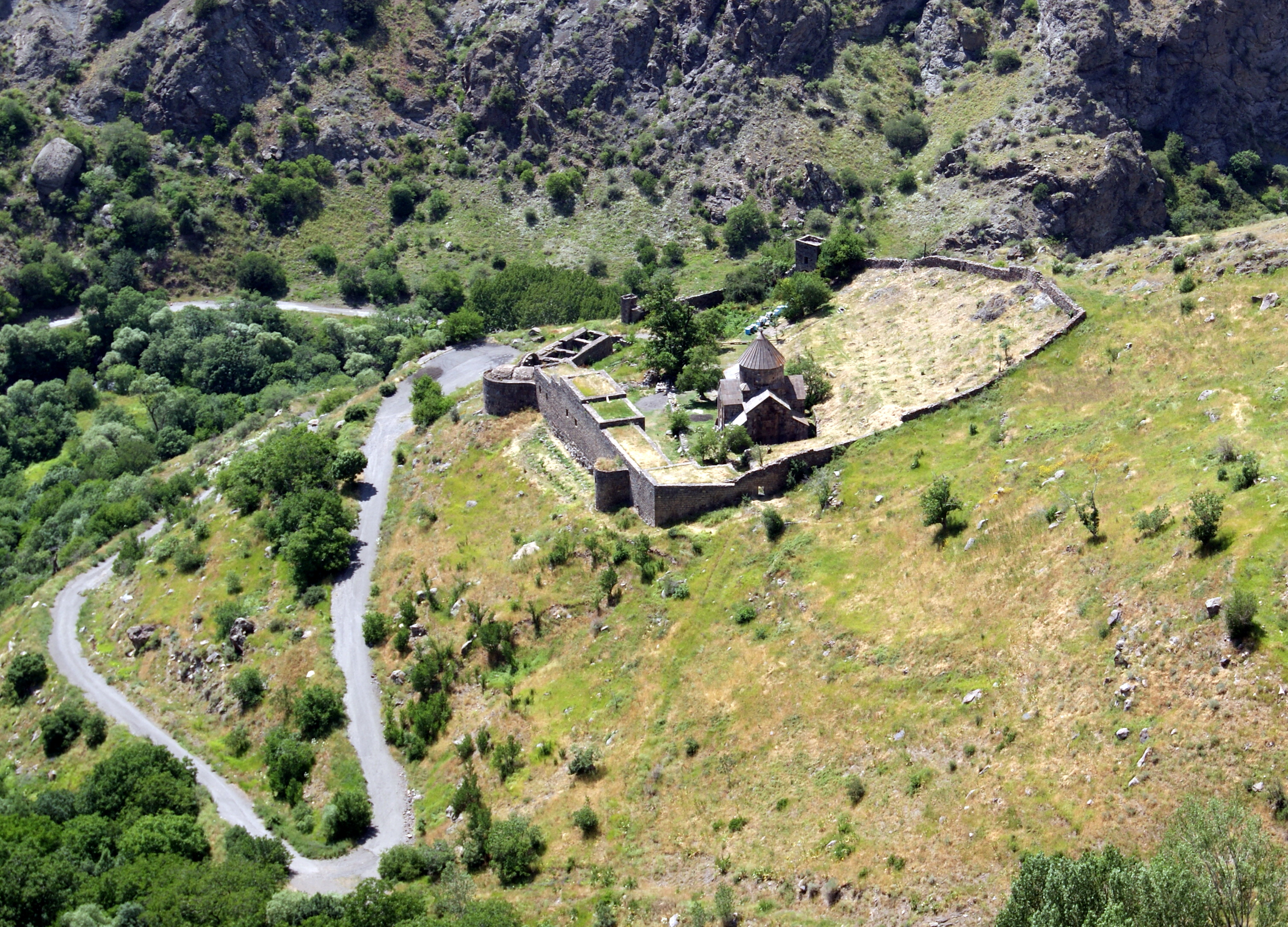
- Gndevank as seen from the road to Jermuk

- Location within Armenia Location within Vayots Dzor

Religion
- Affiliation: Armenian Apostolic Church

Location
- Location: 10 km SW of Jermuk, Armenia
- Coordinates: 39.758846°N 45.610602°E

Architecture
- Style: Armenian
- Completed: 936 AD

Gndevank (Armenian: Գնդեվանք, meaning Round cathedral) is a 10th-century Armenian monastery in the Vayots Dzor Province of Armenia, along the Vayk-Jermuk road.

== Location ==
The monastery is located on the west side of the Vayk-Jermuk road on the bank of the Arpa river. The old road is blocked by landslides and the monastery is approached by walking about 1.5 kilometres (0.93 mi) from the junction with the old road, after a bridge crossing. About 3 kilometres (1.9 mi) away from the church is the rock known as "Vartan Mamikonian." There is a spring water in the vicinity of the church and a few picnic tables.

== History ==
The monastery was constructed between 931 and 938 AD by Princess Sophia of Syunik. Commemorating the foundation, she famously declared: "Vayots Dzor was a ring without a gem, but I built this monastery as the jewel upon it." Priest Sargis was the first abbot of the church. Priest Yeghishe was entrusted the responsibility for its construction. There is also another version of the etymology of the name, according to which the princess sold her earrings (in old Armenian: գինդ (romanized: gind)) so that they could finish the construction works of the church, and the monastery was named Gndevank for that reason (the monastery of earrings).

In 999 AD it was expanded with a gavit, a narthex or entrance to the church. In subsequent years the monastery was fortified with walls around it, under the orders of Abbot Petros (Peter).

The monastery, which was damaged during an earthquake, was refurbished during 1965 and 1969. Further renovations were done during 2013. In 1875, several items of religious paraphernalia were found in a secret chamber in the church.

== Features ==
The church, well preserved, is dedicated to St. Stephen. It is built in the form of a cross-dome of four apses, with a circular tambour (inverted bell of the Corinthian capital) over a cupola. There are four altars in the church. The gavit, added in the western part of the church in subsequent years, is in the shape of barrel; it is vaulted and appears like a tunnel approach to the church. Abbot Christopher built the vaulted hall with two chambers. Sargis, who succeeded him, ordered the construction of a canal from the Vararakn River for providing a water supply to the church, which is still functional. On the southern and western side of the compound wall, monks' living quarters have been built.

Of the surviving wall paintings, one by Yeghishe of Jesus Christ is on the altar wall. Another notable painting in the church is of Mother Mary on the northern annexed wall, which is said to be a masterpiece of the late Middle Ages in Armenia. The surfaces of the pendentives have carved images of the evangelists. The tombstones surrounding the church have carvings of interest, such as a scene of ibex hunting next to a falcon, and the hunting of a boar.

There are khachkars and tombstones of the 10th-16th centuries in the yard of the monastery. Many lithographic inscriptions have been preserved. Also noteworthy is the refectory on the south side of the complex, which is a large hall with a basement, auxiliary rooms and a fireplace.

== Gallery ==
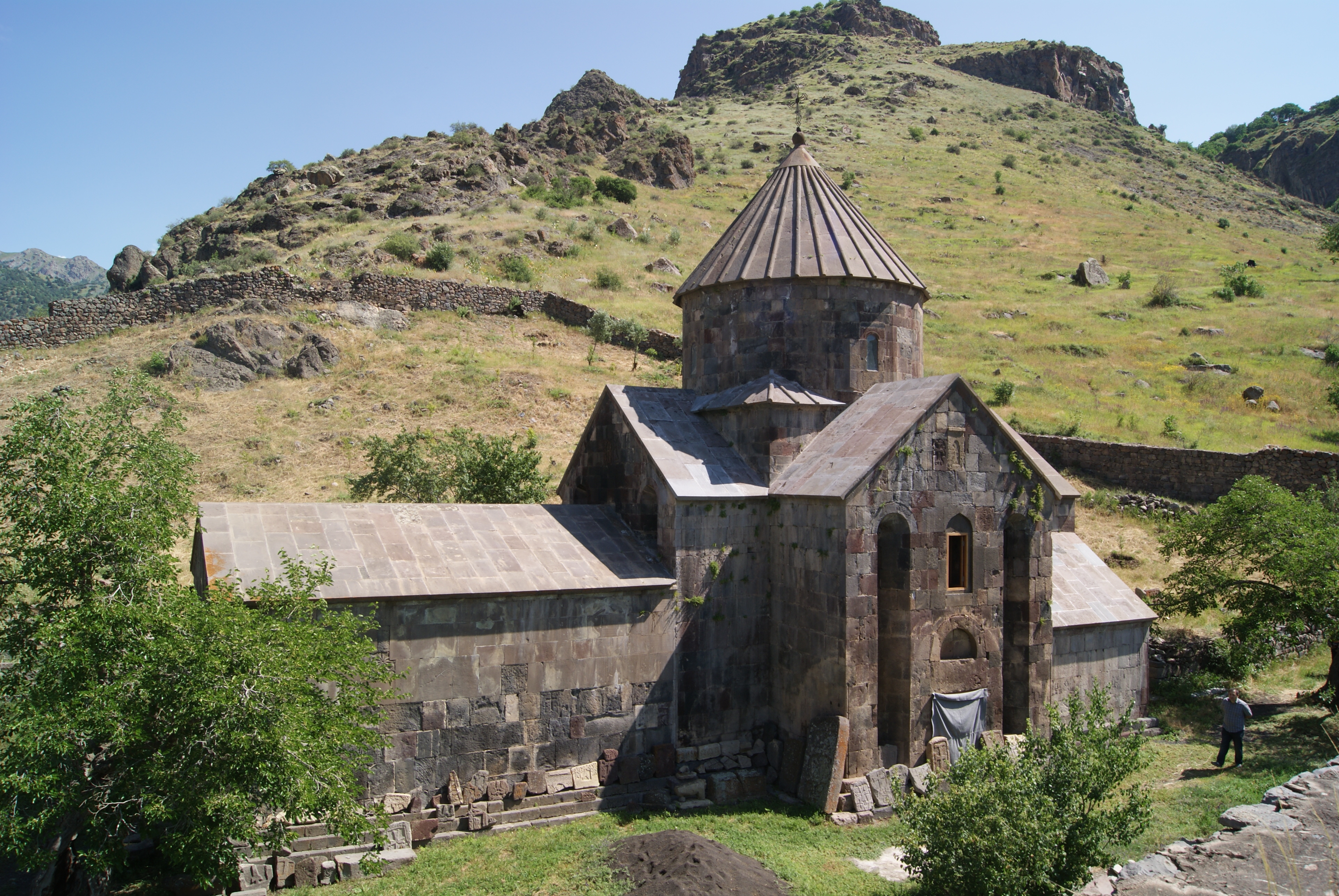

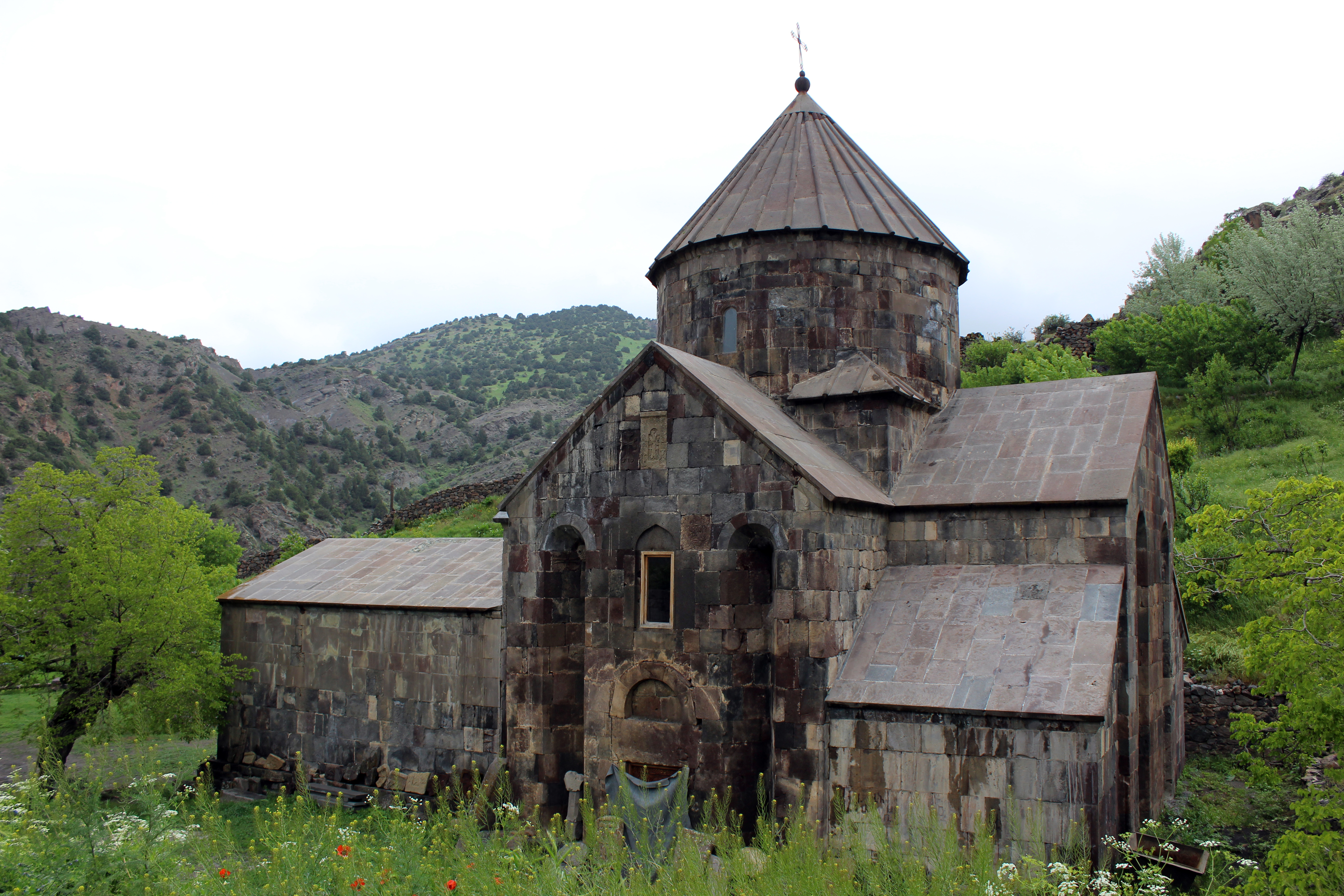

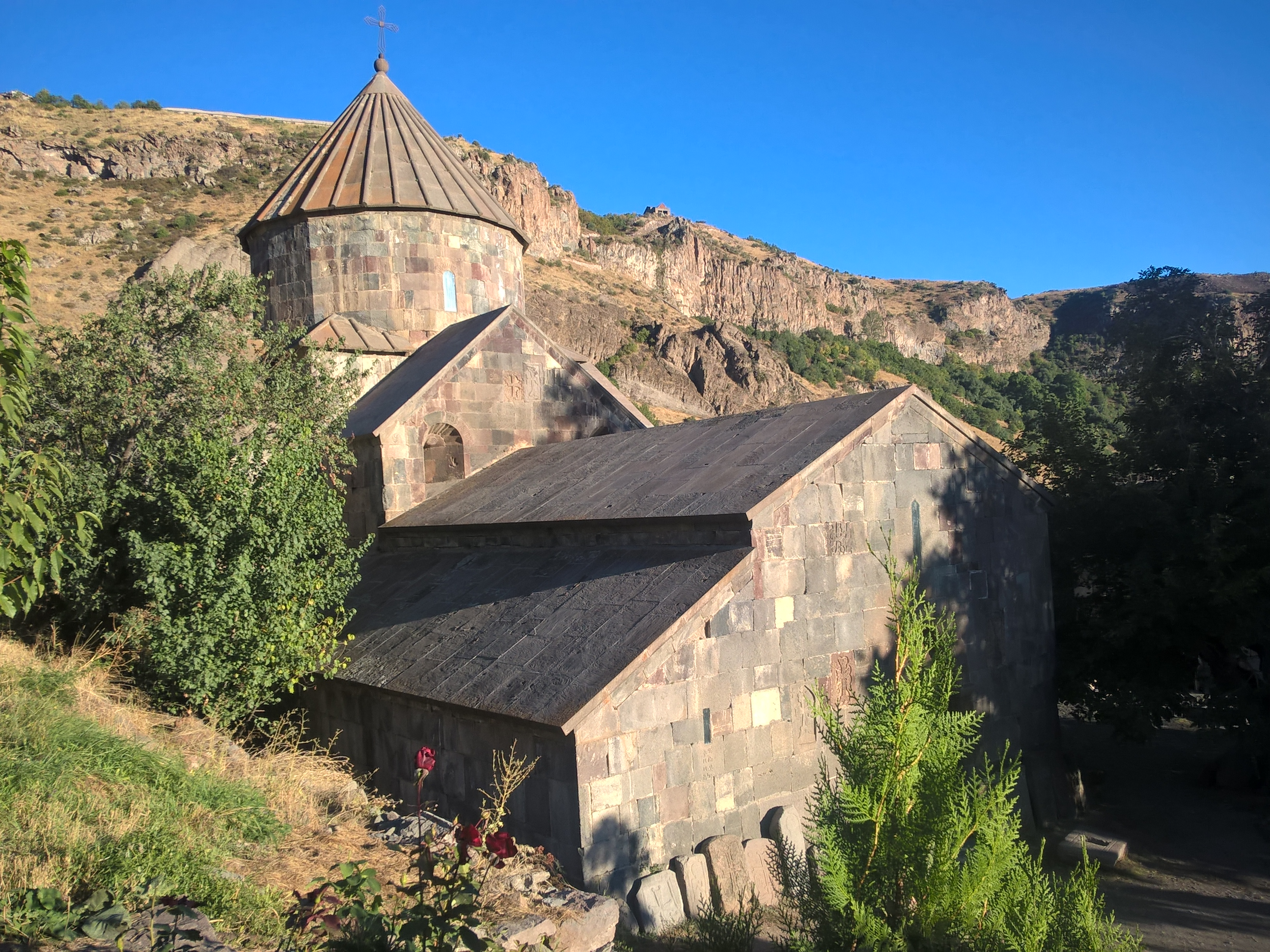

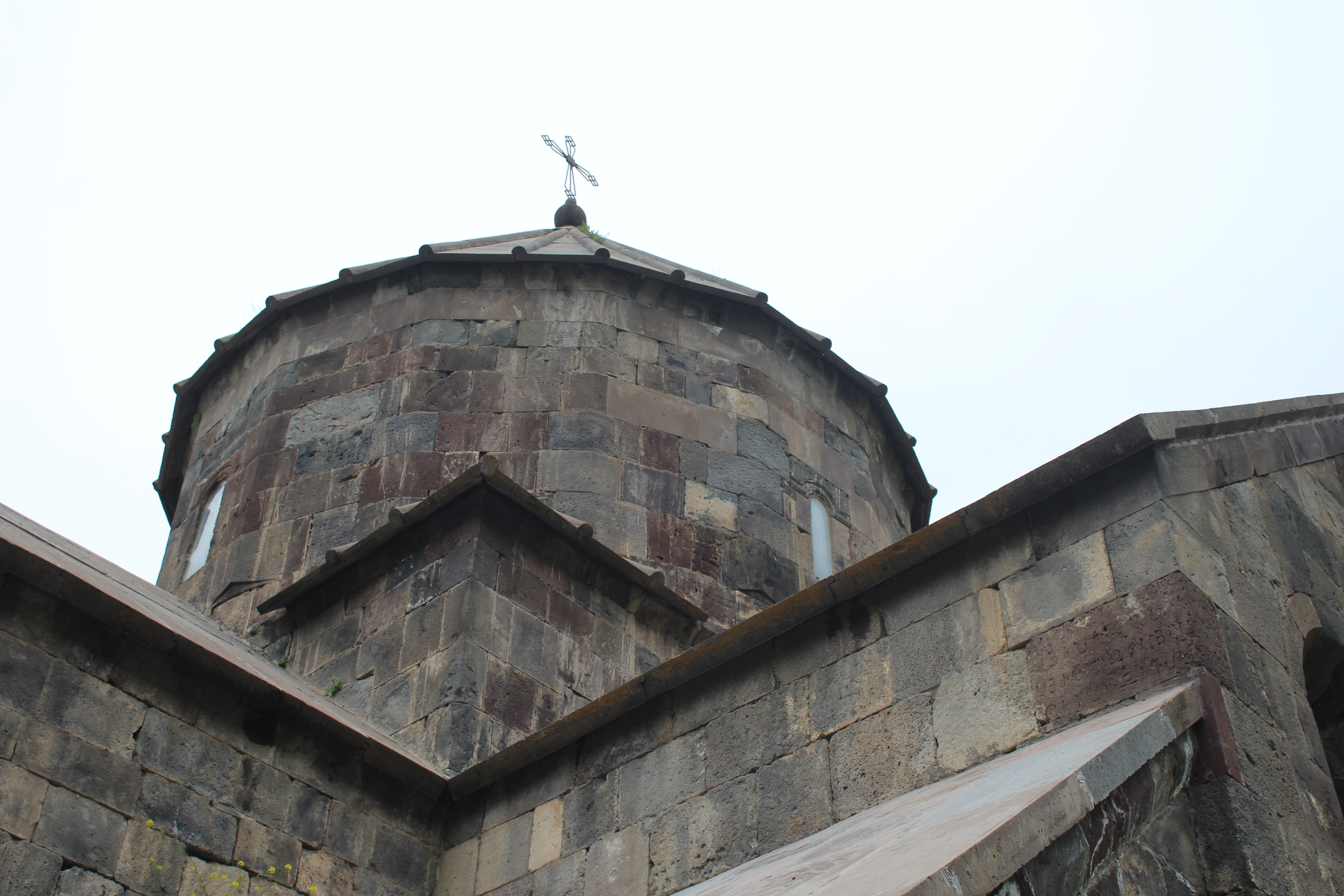

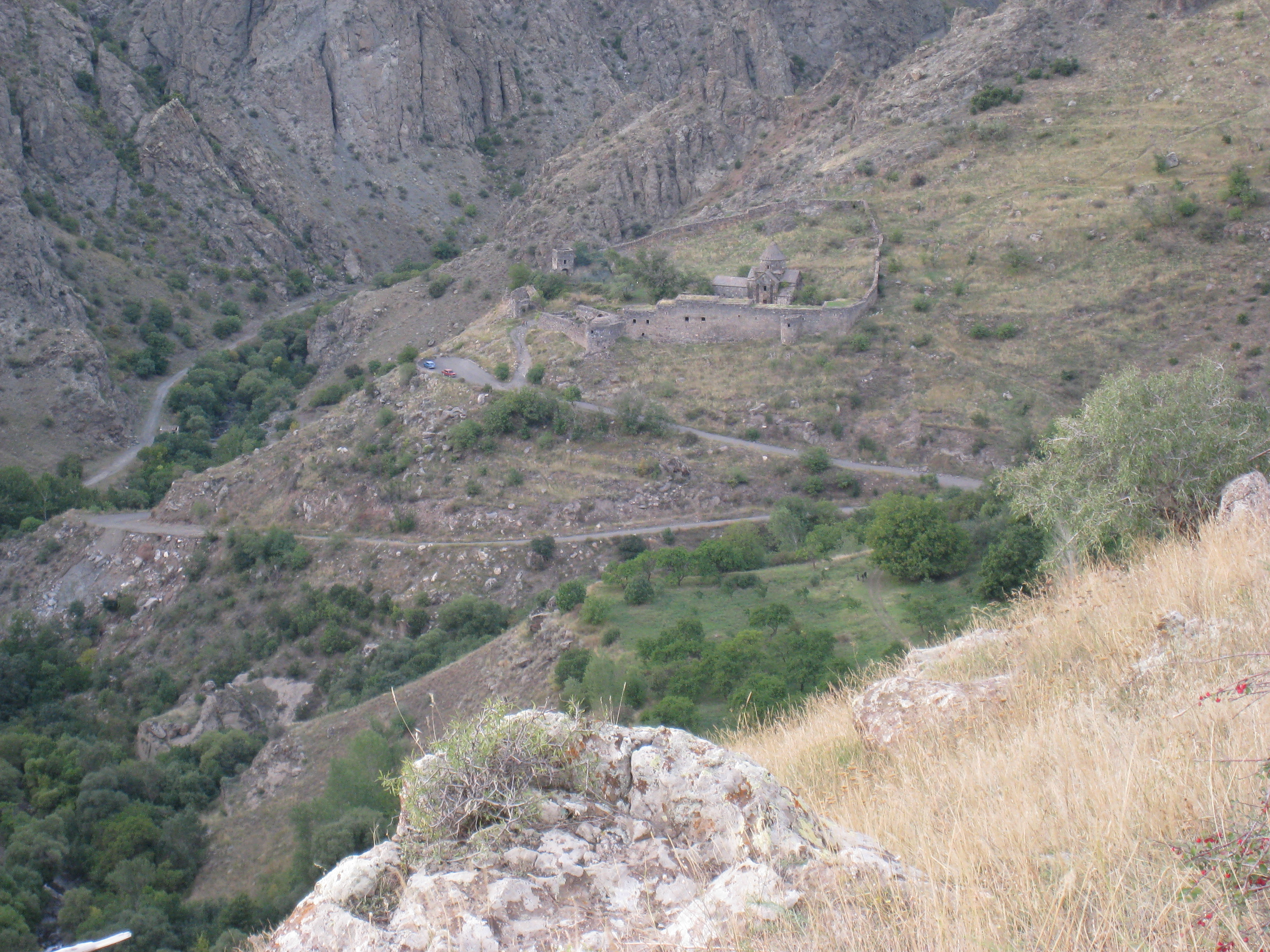

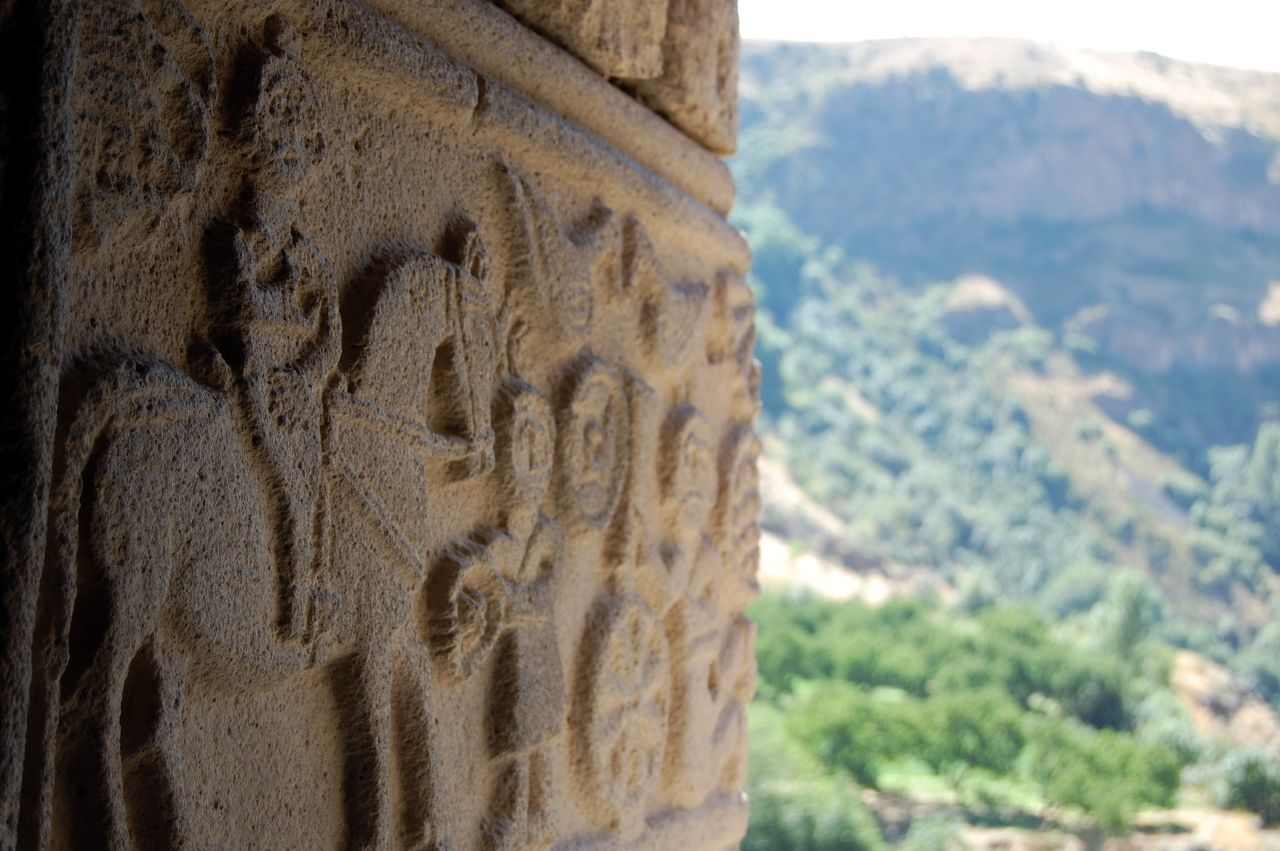

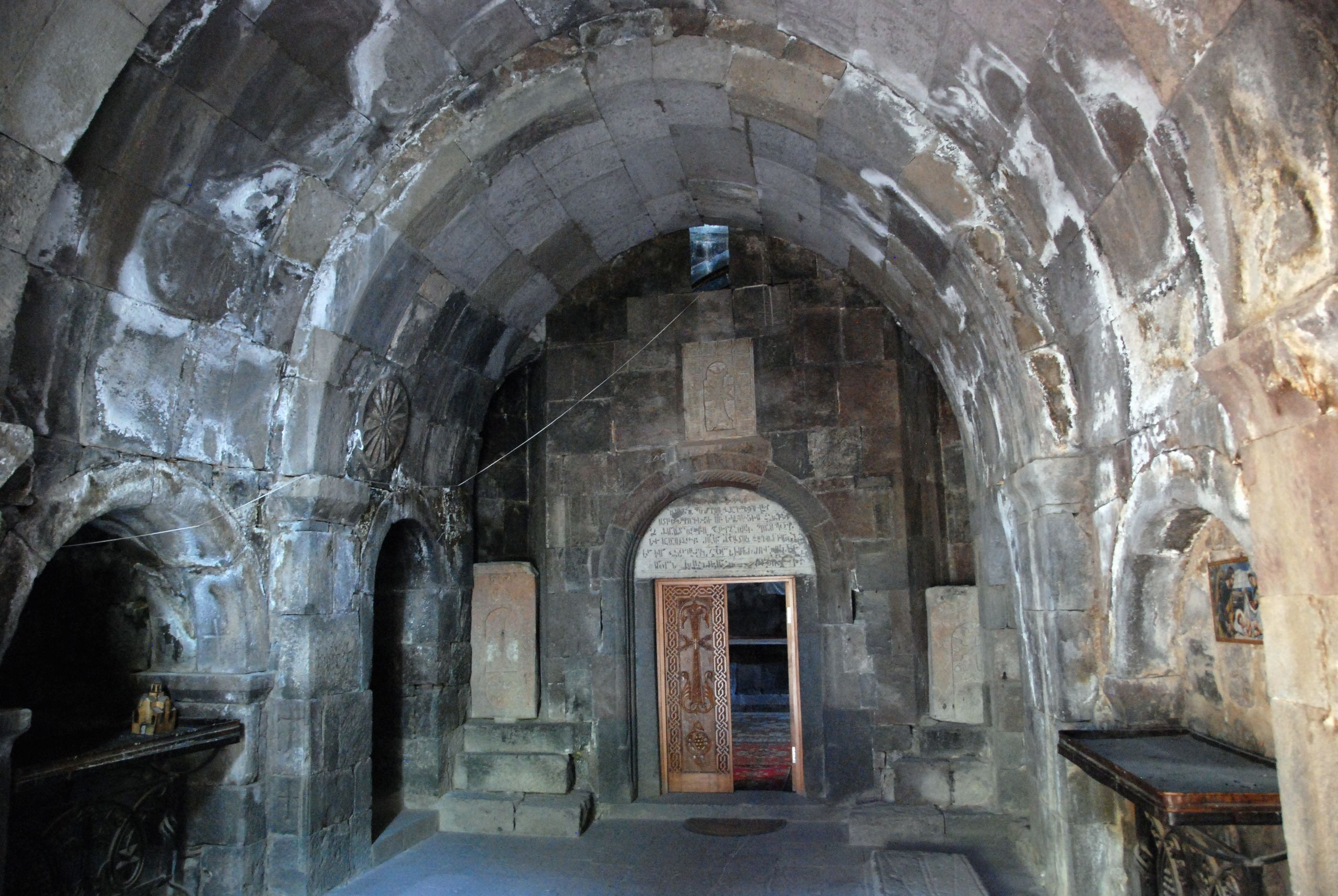

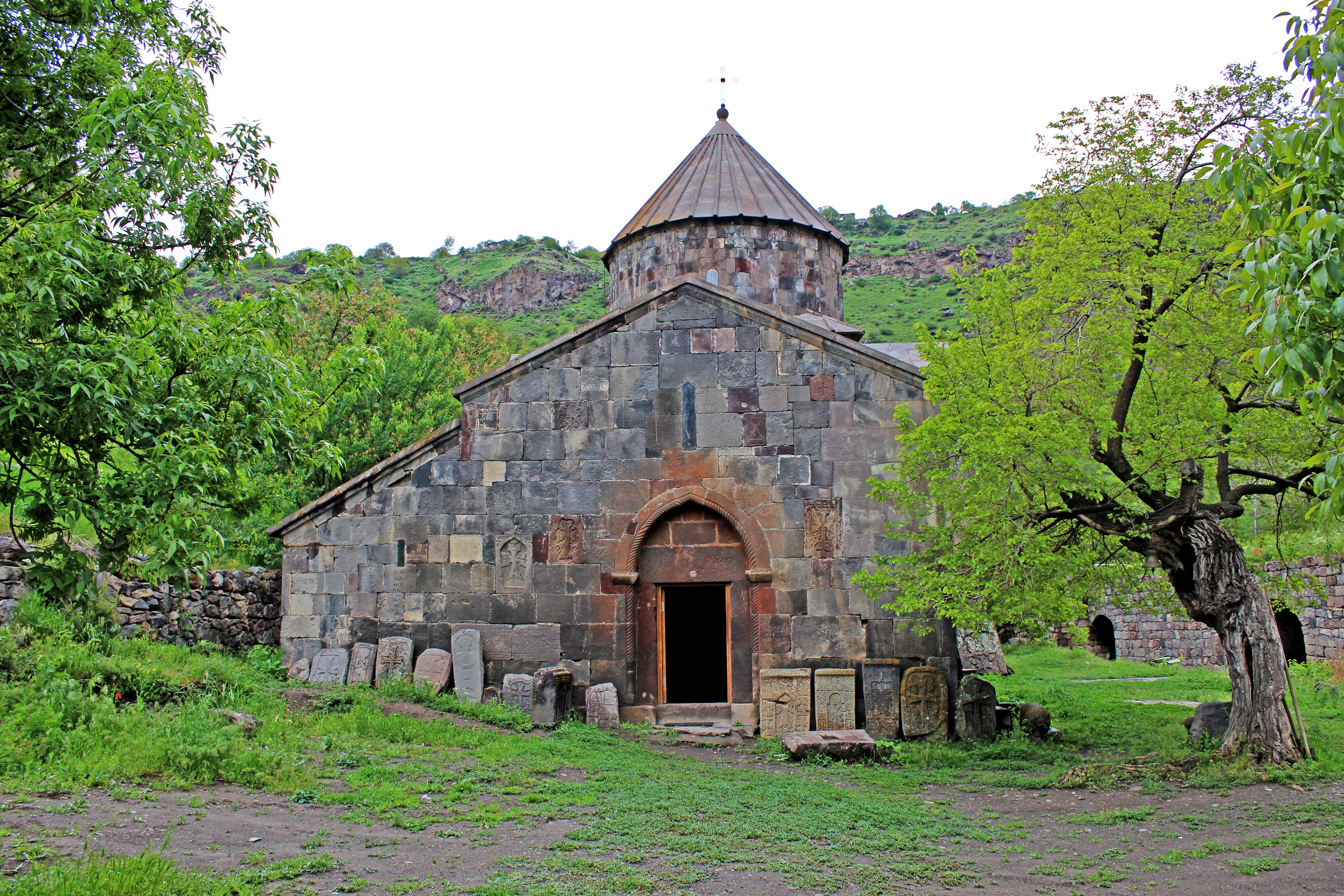

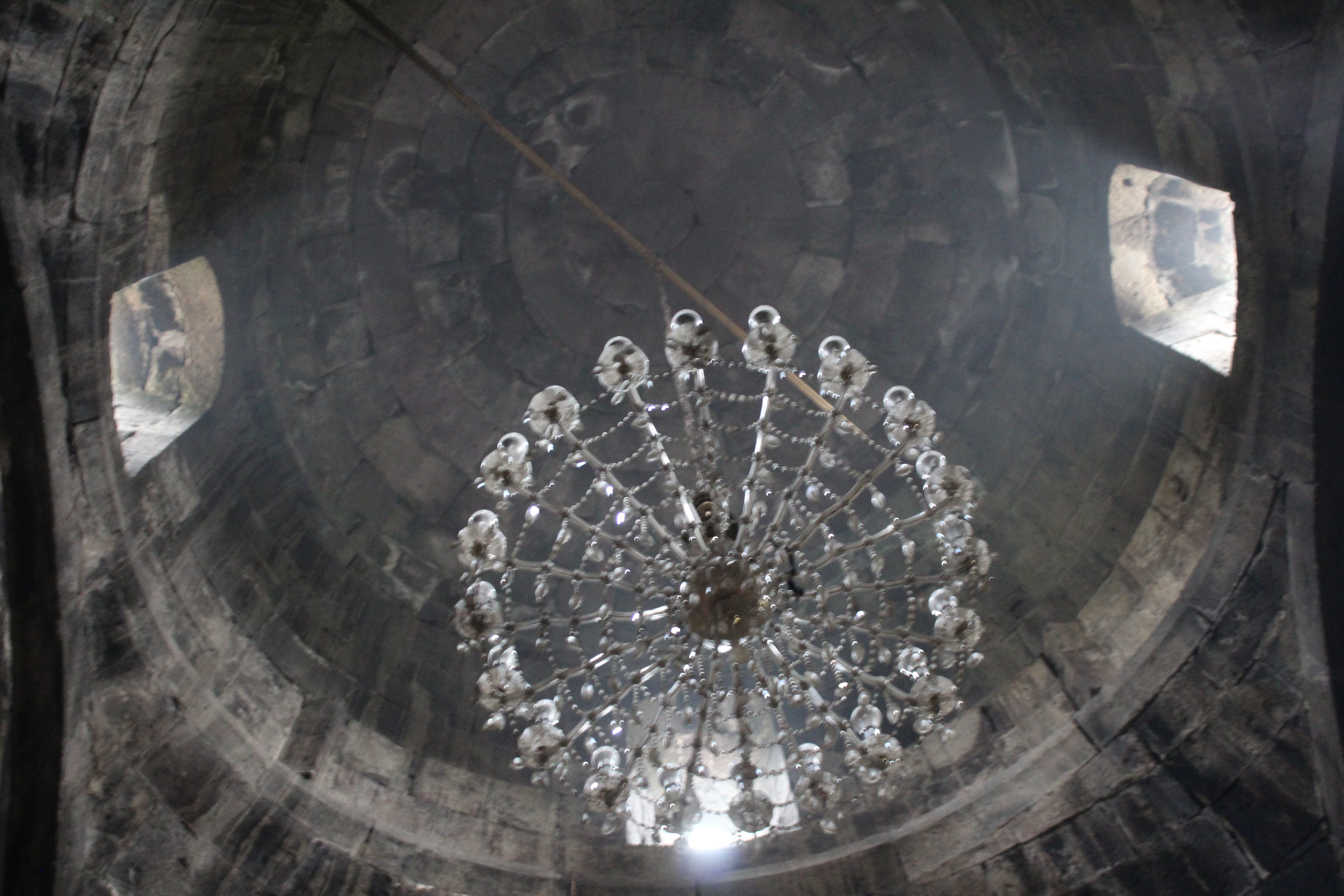

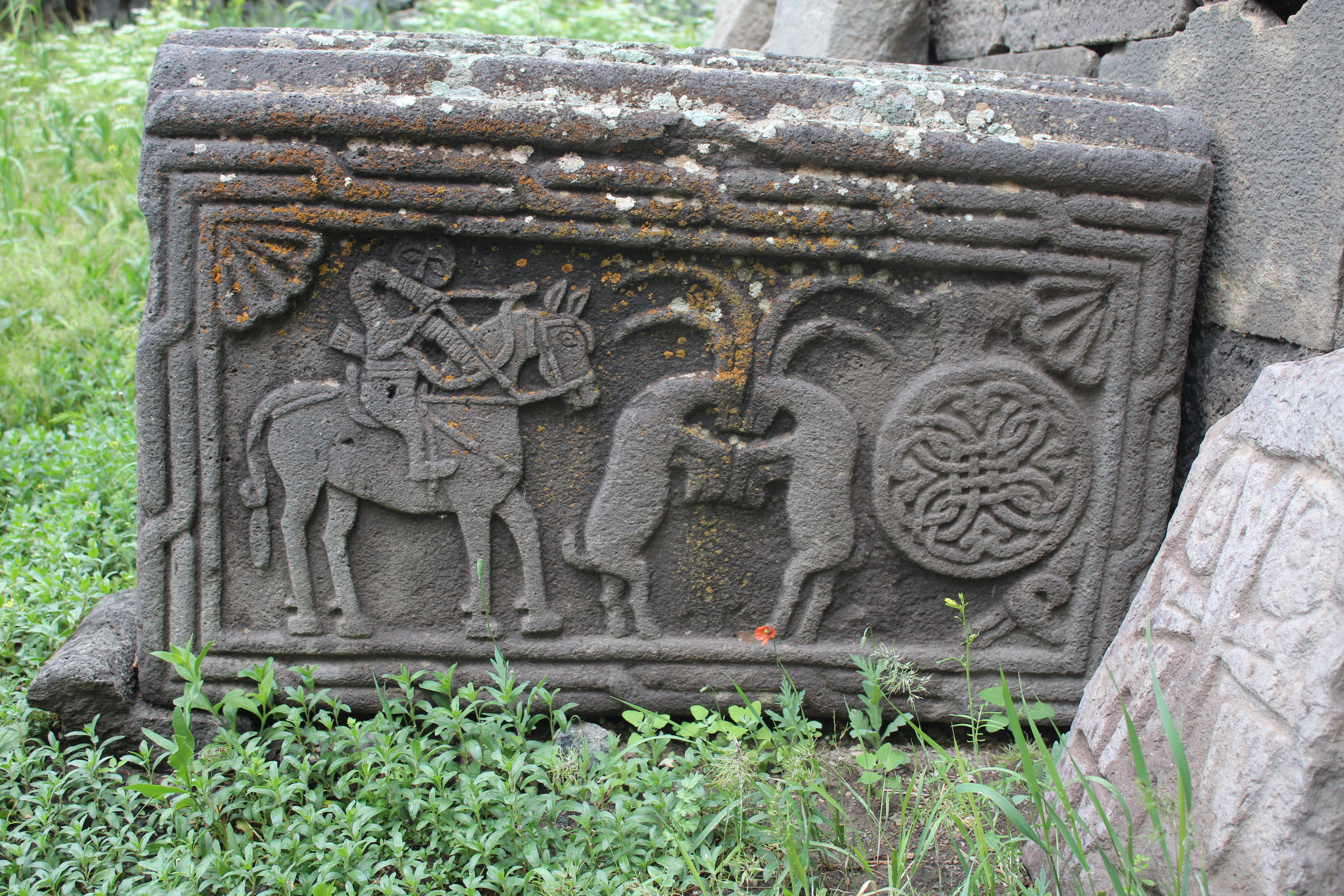

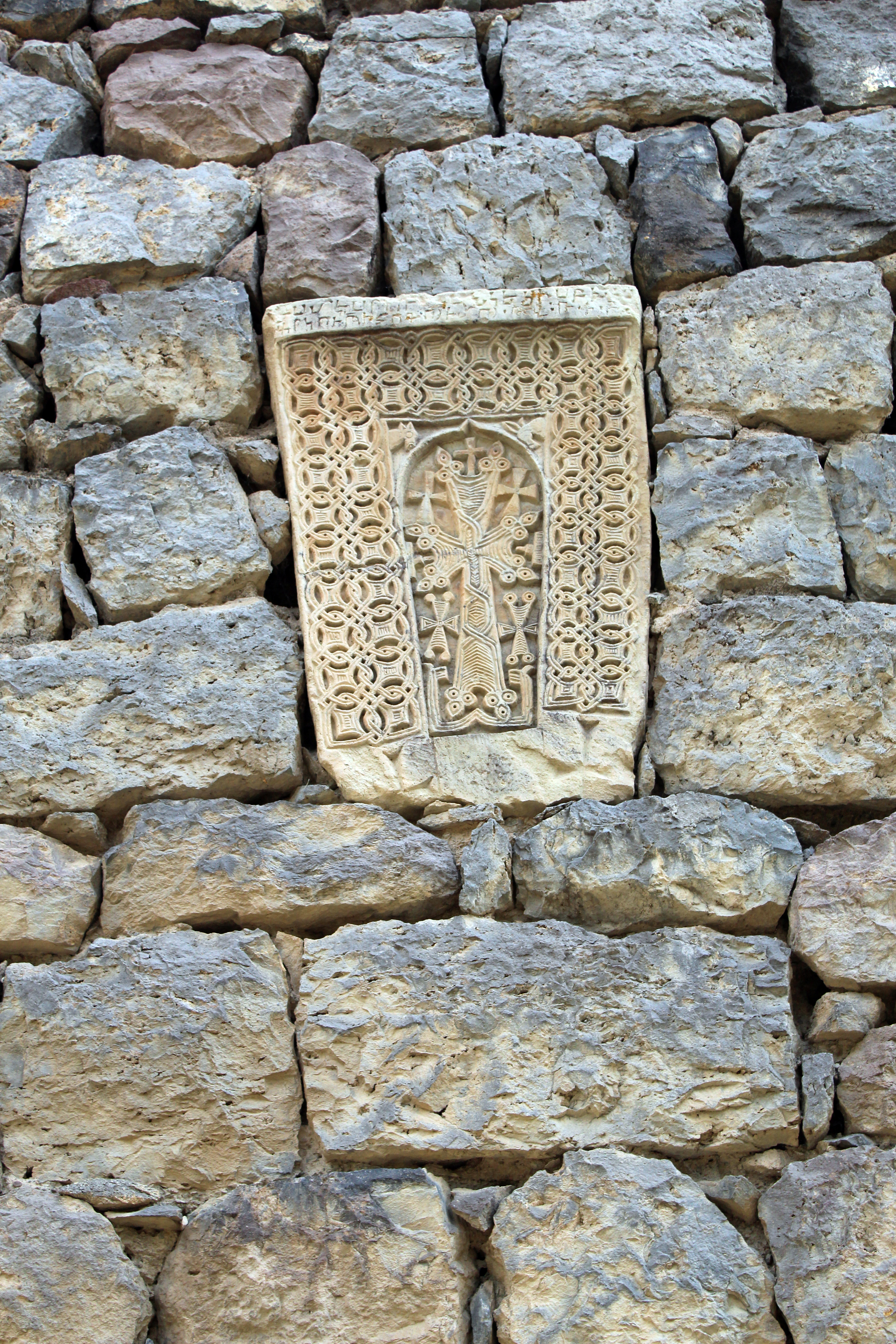

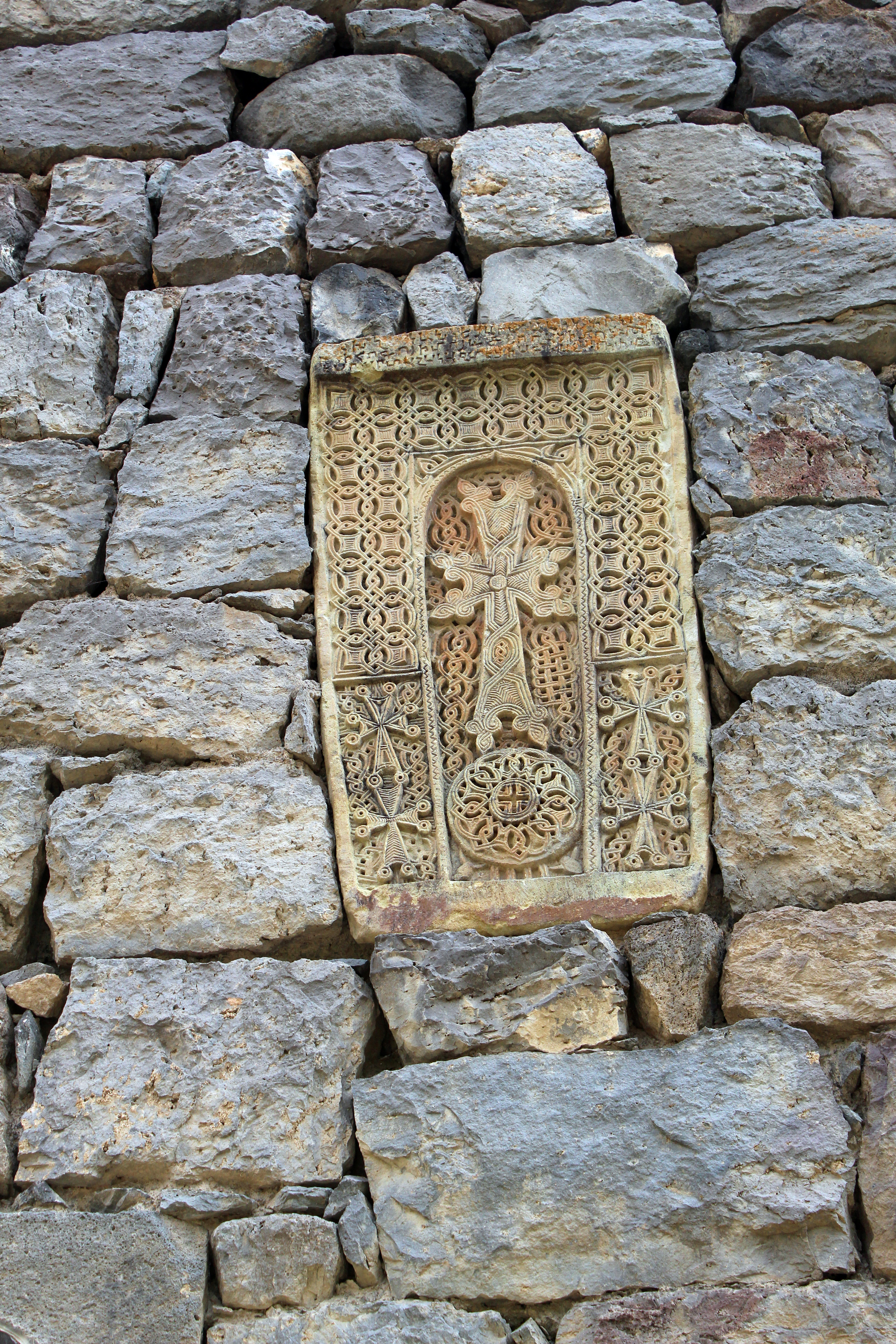

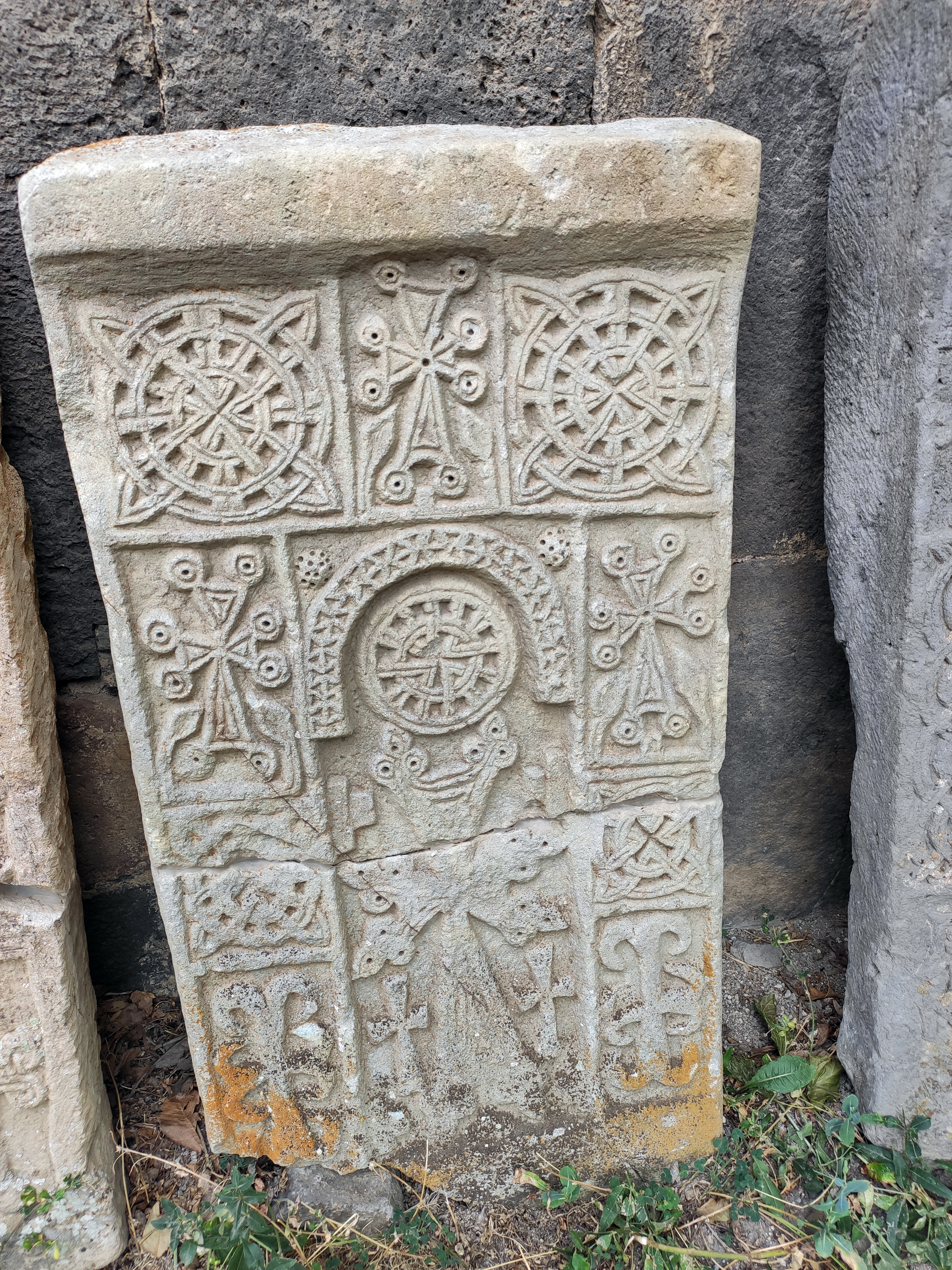

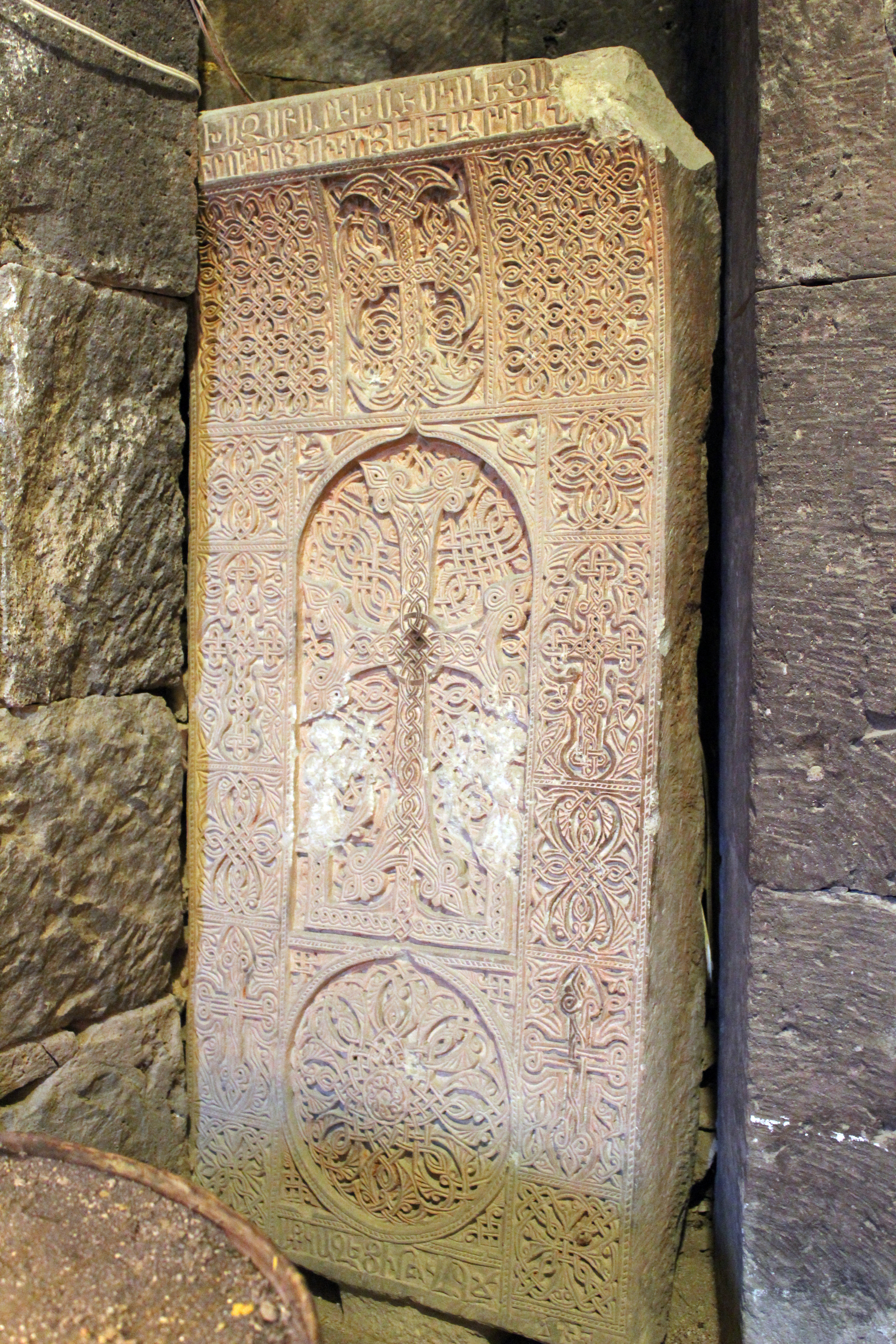

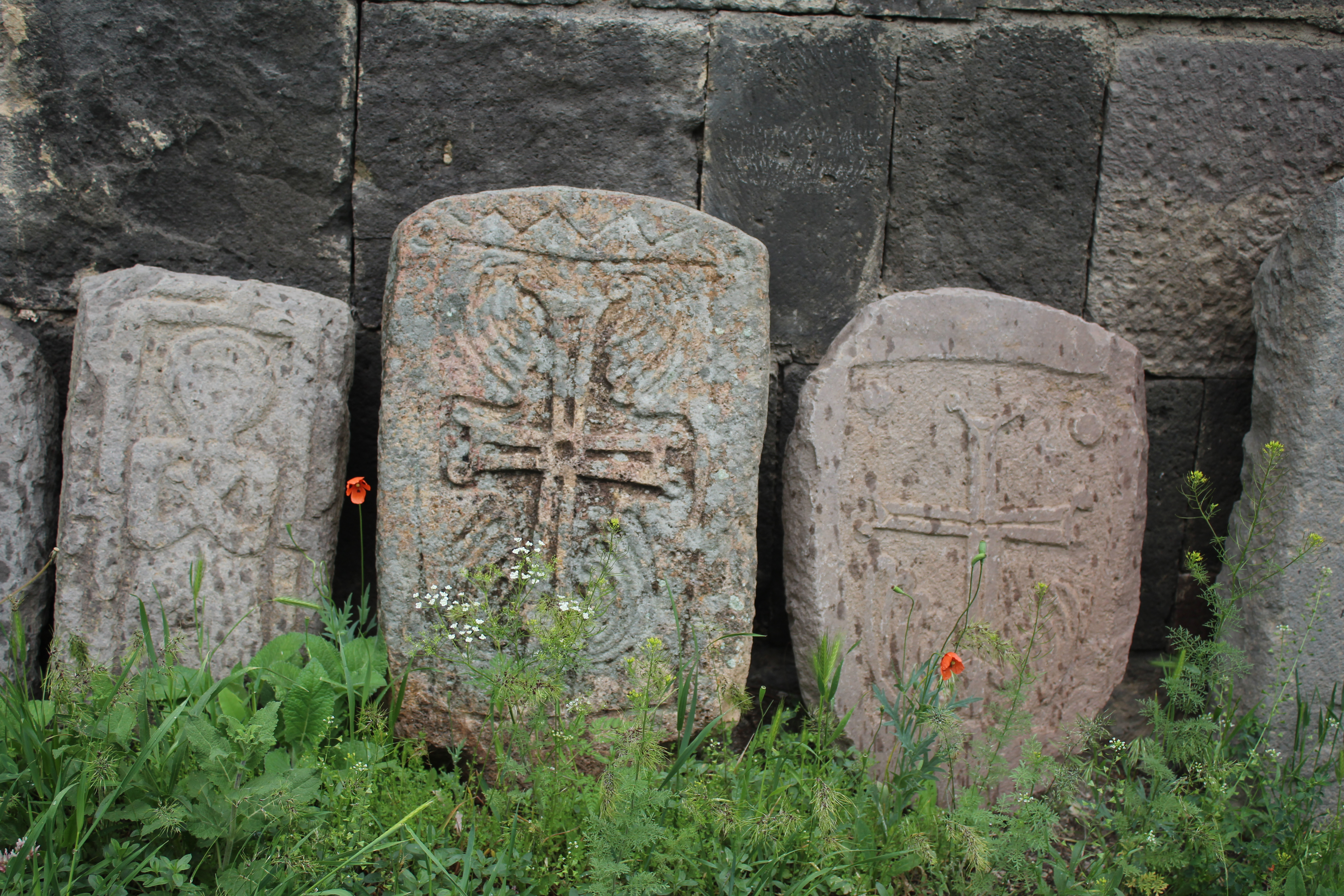

== Bibliography ==
- Auzias, Dominique; Labourdette, Jean-Paul (18 December 2012). Arménie 2012–2013 (avec cartes, photos + avis des lecteurs) (in French). Petit Futé. ISBN 978-2-7469-6170-8.
- Holding, Deirdre (1 September 2014). Armenia: with Nagorno Karabagh. Bradt Travel Guides. ISBN 978-1-84162-555-3.
- Jones, Lynn (1 January 2007). Between Islam and Byzantium: Aght'amar and the Visual Construction of Medieval Armenian Rulership. Ashgate Publishing, Ltd. ISBN 978-0-7546-3852-0.
