= Jermuk Community =

Jermuk Ջերմուկ
- Urban Community
- Interactive map of Jermuk
- Coordinates: 39°47′N 45°30′E
- Country: Armenia
- Province: Vayots Dzor
- Formed: 8 October 2016
- Administrative centre: Jermuk

Government
  - Mayor: Vahagn Arsenyan

Area
  - Total: 497 km^{2} (192 sq mi)

Population (2011 census)
  - Total: 7,359
  - Density: 14.8/km^{2} (38.3/sq mi)
- Time zone: AMT (UTC+04)
- Postal code: 3601–3810
- ISO 3166 code: AM-VD
- FIPS 10-4: AM10

Jermuk Municipality, referred to as Jermuk Community (Armenian: Ջերմուկ Համայնք Jermuk Hamaynk) is an urban community and administrative subdivision of Vayots Dzor Province in southeastern Armenia, consisting of a group of villages and its administrative centre, the town of Jermuk.

== Settlements ==
Settlement	Type	Population (2011 census)
Jermuk	Town, administrative centre	5,572
Gndevaz	Village	829
Herher	Village	706
Karmrashen	Village	252

== Politics ==
Jermuk Municipal Assembly (Armenian: Ջերմուկի համայնքապետարան, Jermuki hamaynqapetaran) is the representative body in Jermuk Municipality, consisting of 15 members who are elected every five years. In the December 2021 election Vahagn Arsenyan of Civil Contract was elected mayor.

Party	2021	Current Municipal Assembly
**Civil Contract**	**13**	
Our Community Alliance	**1**	
Country of Living	**1**	
Total	15	

Ruling coalition or party marked in bold.

Our Community Alliance is an alliance between Armenian Revolutionary Federation and Solidarity Party.

== See also ==
- Vayots Dzor Province
