= Araratian Pontifical Diocese =

Armenian Apostolic diocese

Diocese of Araratian Արարատյան Հայրապետական թեմ
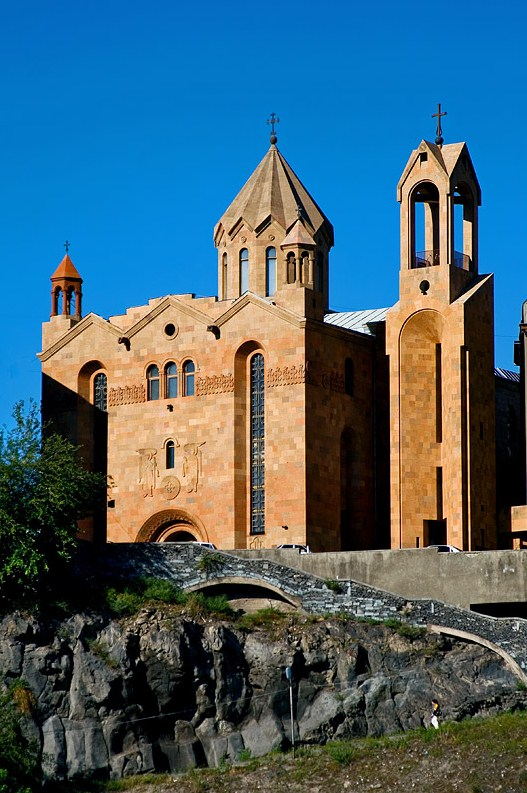
- Saint Sarkis Cathedral

Location
- Country: Armenia

Statistics
- Population: Total: (as of 2011); 1,000,000

Information
- Denomination: Armenian Apostolic Church
- Rite: Armenian Rite
- Established: 4th century
- Cathedral: Saint Sarkis, Yerevan

Current leadership
- Patriarch: Karekin II
- Pontifical vicar: Archbishop Navasard Kchoyan

Website
- Official website

Araratian Pontifical Diocese (Armenian: Արարատյան Հայրապետական թեմ Araratyan Hayrapetakan t'em) is the largest diocese of the Armenian Apostolic Church and one of the oldest dioceses in the world, covering the city of Yerevan, Armenia. The Ararat Province was also included in the Araratian Diocese until 2021, when the Diocese of Masyatsostn was established to cover the Ararat Province.

== History ==
The origin of Araratian Pontifical Diocese dates back the beginning of the 4th century. With the Christianzation of Armenia, Saint Gregory the Illuminator established the Catholicosate of All Armenians in Vagharshapat, as well as the Araratian Pontifical Diocese and appointed Bishop Albianus as the first primate vicar of the newly-founded diocese. The name of the diocese is derived from Mount Ararat; the symbol of the Armenian nation. At first, the diocese included the territories of the Ararat plain, Nakhijevan, Kotayk and the western territories of Lake Sevan. It is believed that the diocese was commonly known as the Diocese of Yerevan between the 15th and 19th centuries. Under the Russian rule during the mid-19th century, the jurisdiction of the diocese was expanded to include the territories of Syunik and Shirak as well, followed by the area of Kars in 1878, covering almost the entire area of Eastern Armenia.

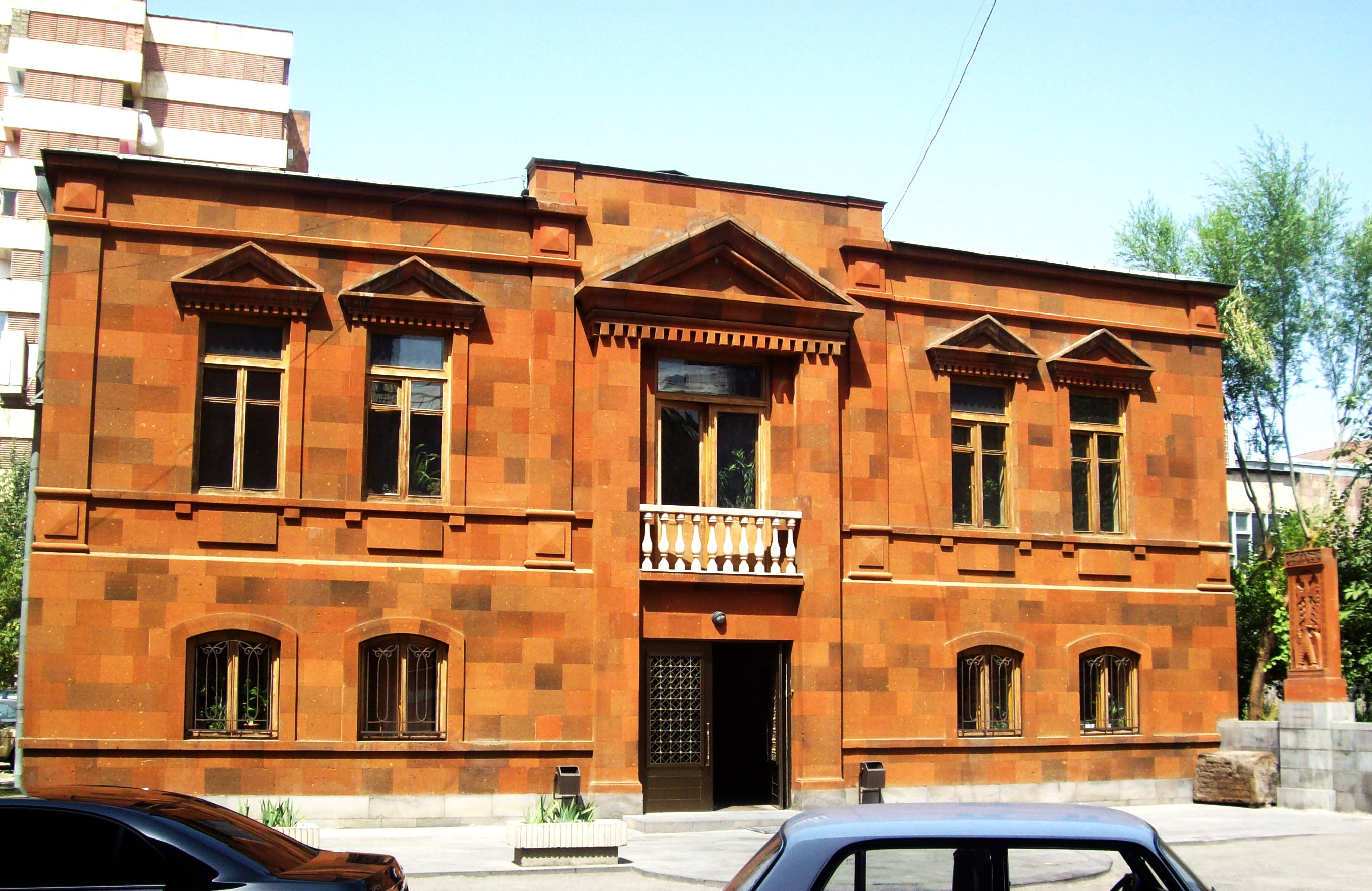
The prelacy building near the Surp Sarkis Cathedral in Yerevan

At the beginning of the 20th century, the Araratian Pontifical Diocese had 643 churches, 13 monastic complexes and more than 150 schools functioning under its jurisdiction. In August 1920, upon a kontakion issued by Catholicos George V, the territory of Shirak was separated from the Araratian Diocese to form the Diocese of Shirak. After the Treaty of Moscow in 1921, the Araratian Diocese lost the territories of Kars and Nakhijevan. The diocese lost most of its properties under the Soviet rule between 1920 and 1991.

With the independence of Armenia in 1991, the Armenian Church was reorganized, most of the properties were returned to the church and many new dioceses were established based on the administrative divisions of Armenia.

Currently, the Araratian Pontifical Diocese is the largest diocese of the Armenian Church, with around 1.3 million people under its jurisdiction. The primate vicar of the diocese is Archbishop Navasard Kchoyan, serving since 1999. The diocesan headquarters are located in the capital Yerevan, next to the Saint Sarkis Cathedral.

== Active churches ==
As of June 2017, the diocese has the below listed churches and chapels functioning under its jurisdiction, operating throughout Yerevan and Ararat Province, with the exception of the 17th-century Khor Virap monastic complex in Ararat Province, the Cathedral of Saint Gregory in Yerevan opened in 2001, and the Surp Anna Church in Yerevan opened in 2015, which are directly regulated by the Mother See of Holy Etchmiadzin.

Here is the list of churches, monasteries and chapels functioning under the jurisdiction of the Araratian Pontifical Diocese, along with their location and year of consecration:

=== Churches ===
In Yerevan

- Katoghike Church, 1264
- Saint Hakob Church of Kanaker, 1679
- Zoravor Surp Astvatsatsin Church, 1694
- Surp Gevork Church of Noragavit, 17th century
- Saint John the Baptist Church, 1710
- Saint Sarkis Cathedral, 1842
- Surp Kiraki Church, 19th century
- Holy Mother of God Church of Nork-Marash, 1995
- Holy Vartanants Martyrs Church of Yerablur, 1998
- Holy Mother of God Church of Malatia-Sebastia, 1998
- Saint Sarkis Church of Nor Nork, 1999
- Holy Mother of God Church of Avan, Yerevan, 2002
- Holy Martyrs Church of Davtashen, 2003
- Holy Trinity Church, 2005
- Surp Khach Church of Charbakh, 2006
- Holy Mother of God Church of Nor Nork, 2014
- Holy Martyrs Church of Nubarashen, 2015
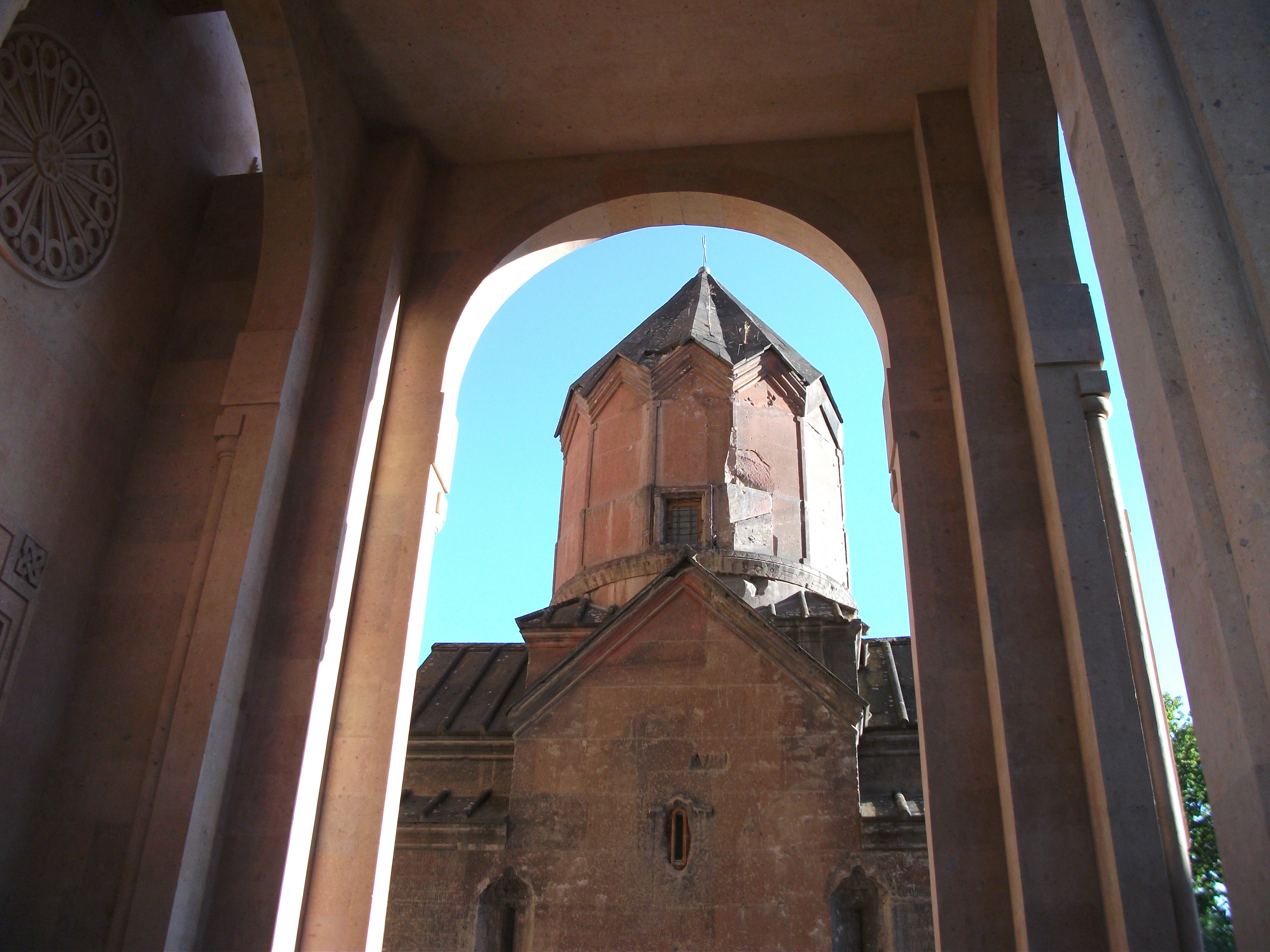
Katoghike Church, 1264

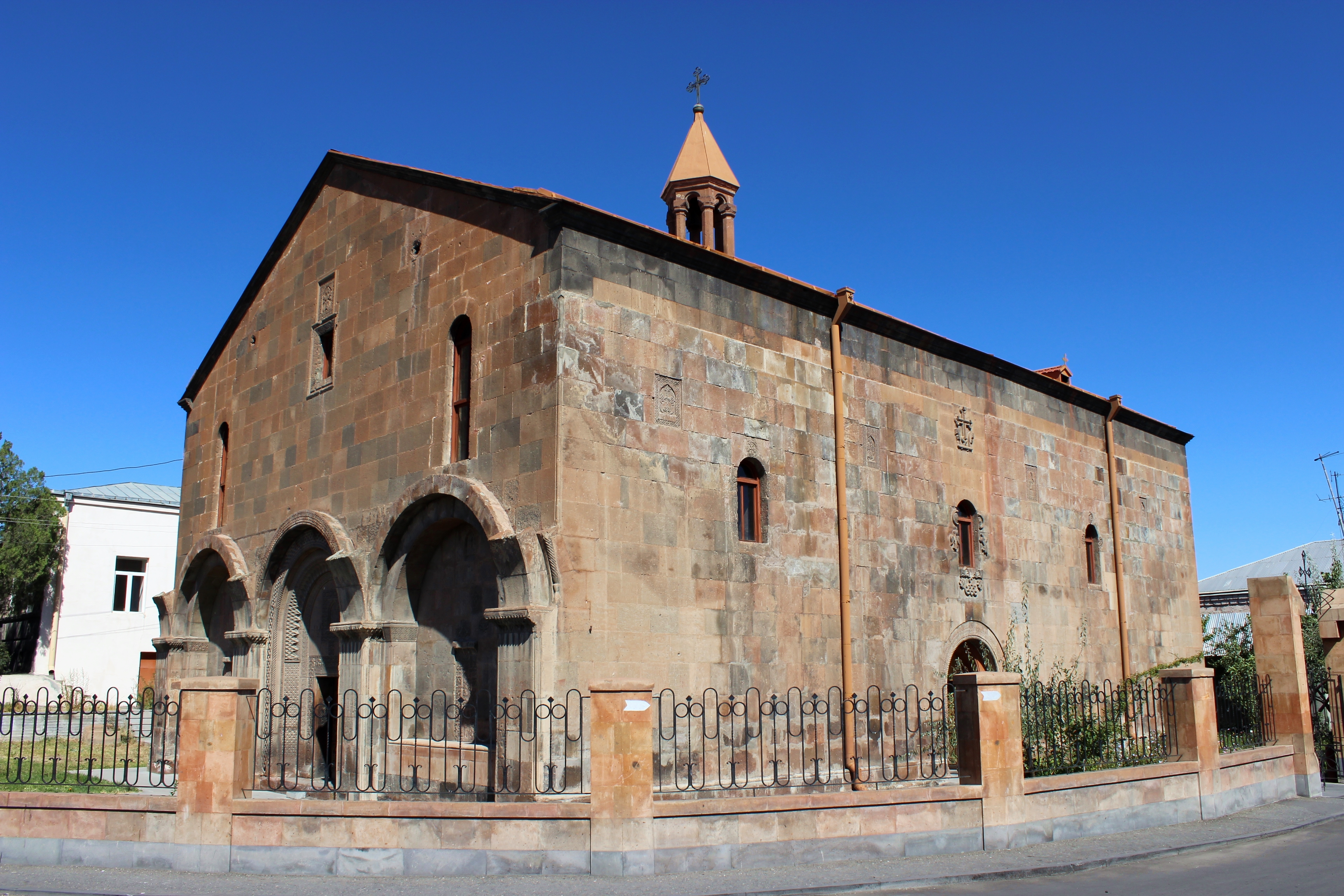
Saint Hakob Church of Kanaker, 1679

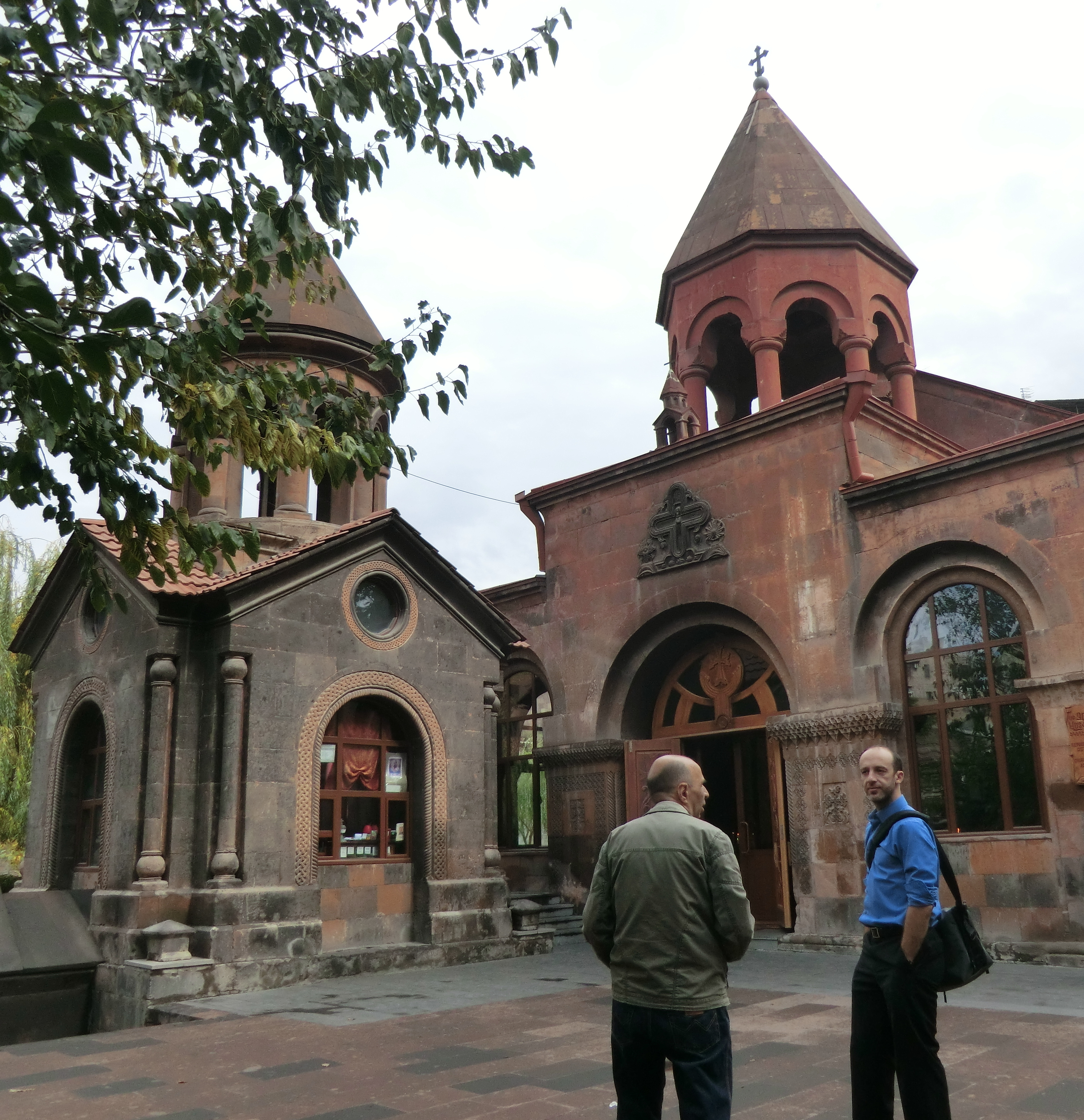
Zoravor Surp Astvatsatsin Church, 1694

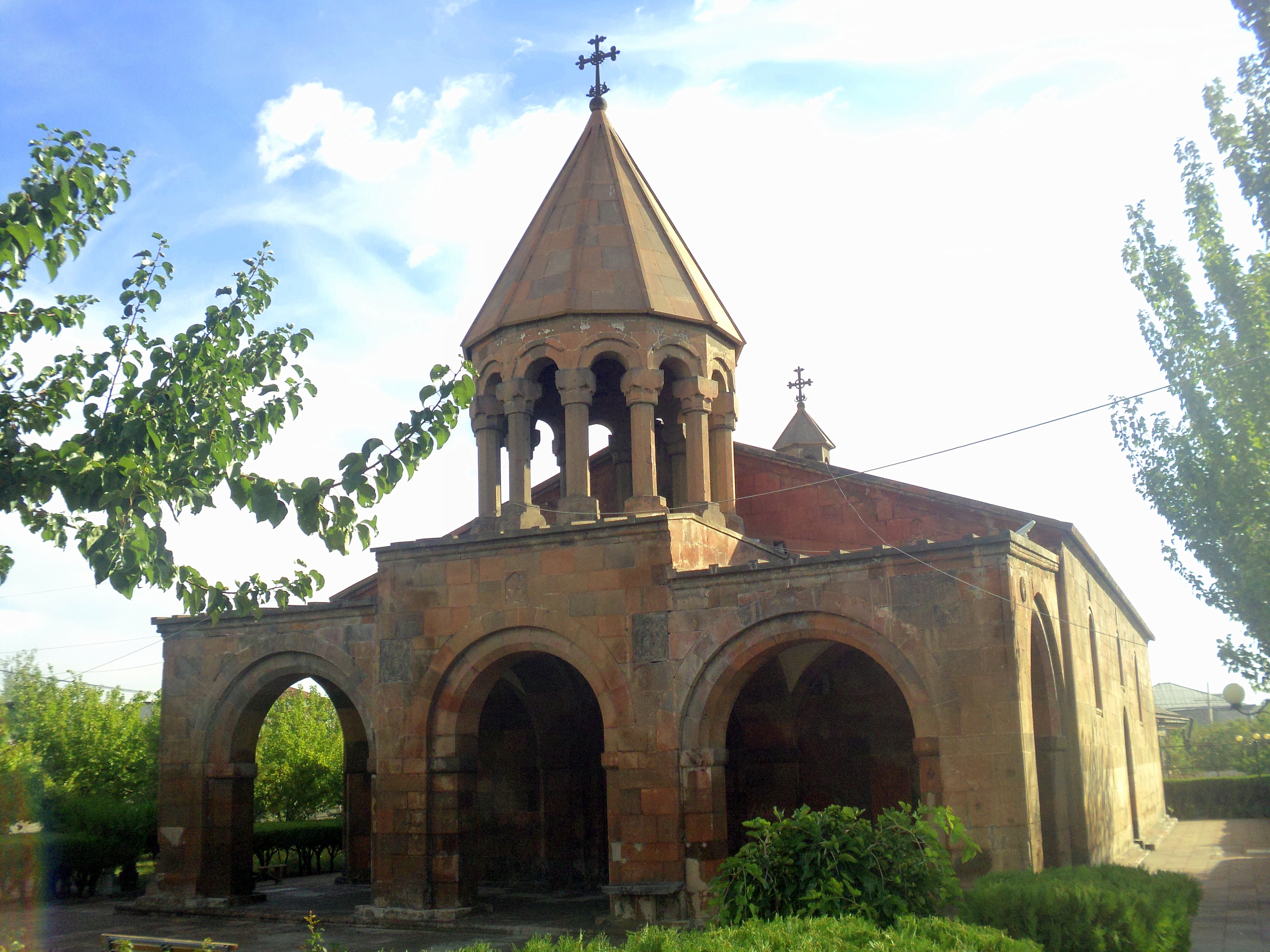
Surp Gevork Church of Noragavit, 17th century

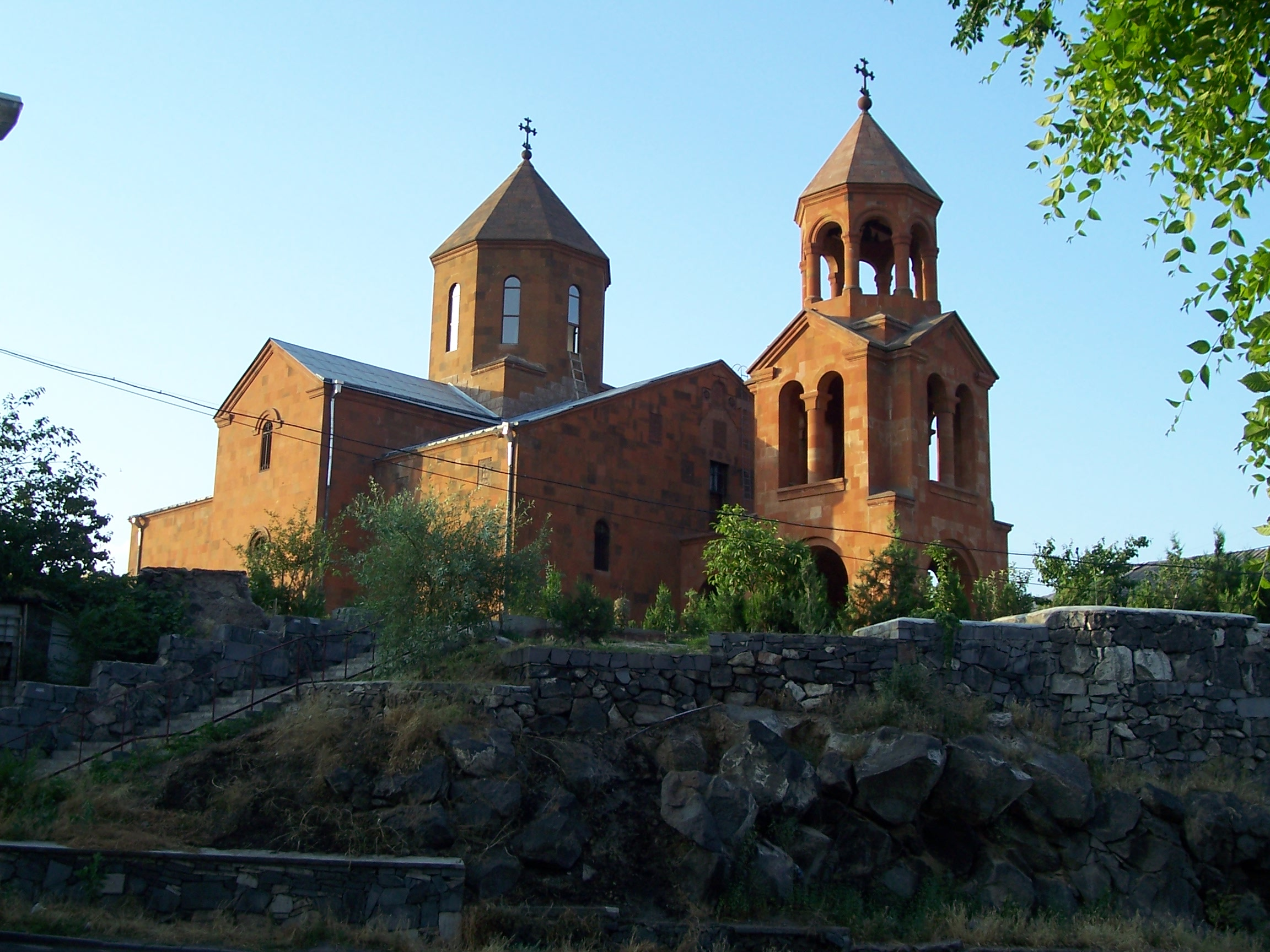
Saint John the Baptist Church, 1710

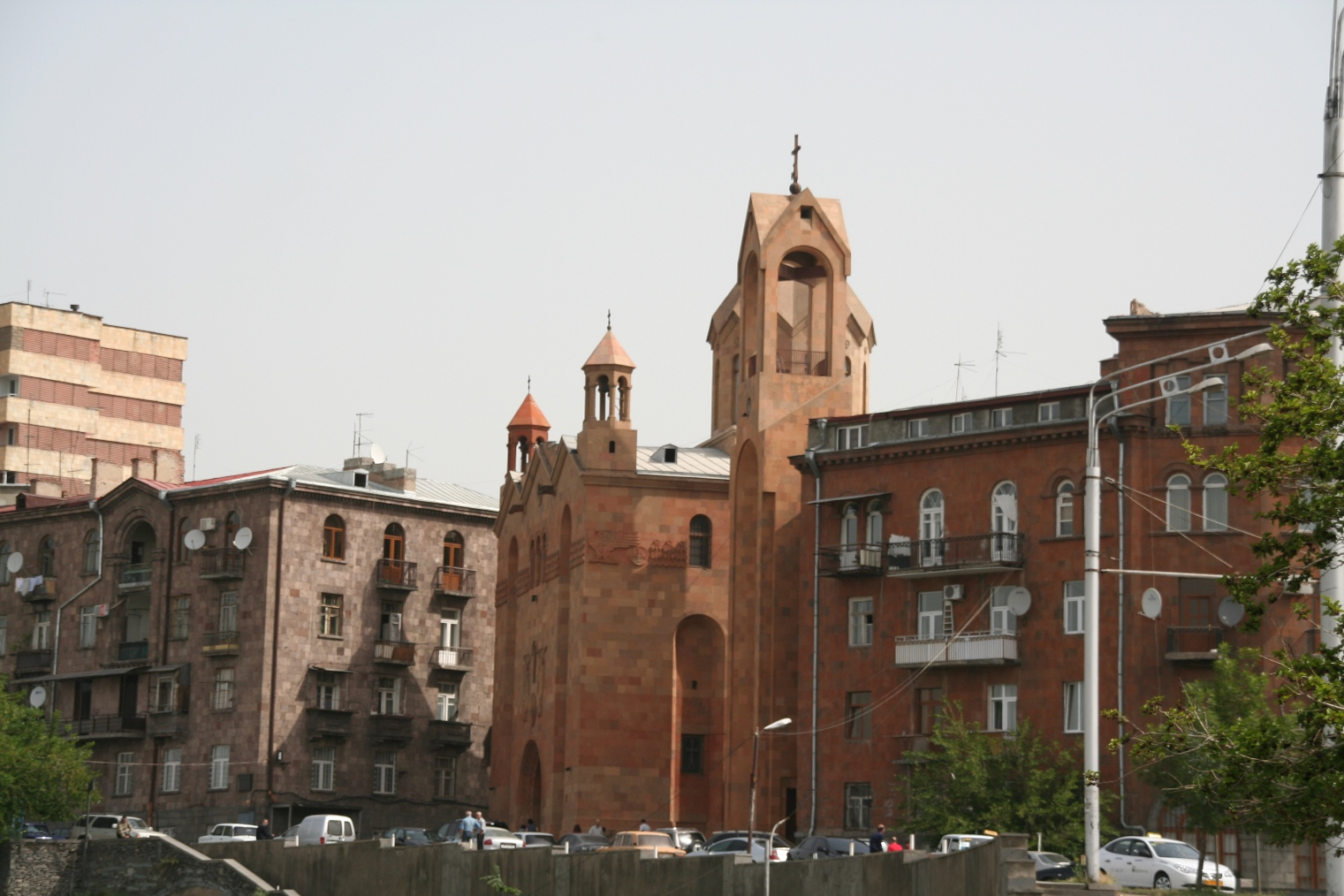
Saint Sarkis Cathedral, 1842

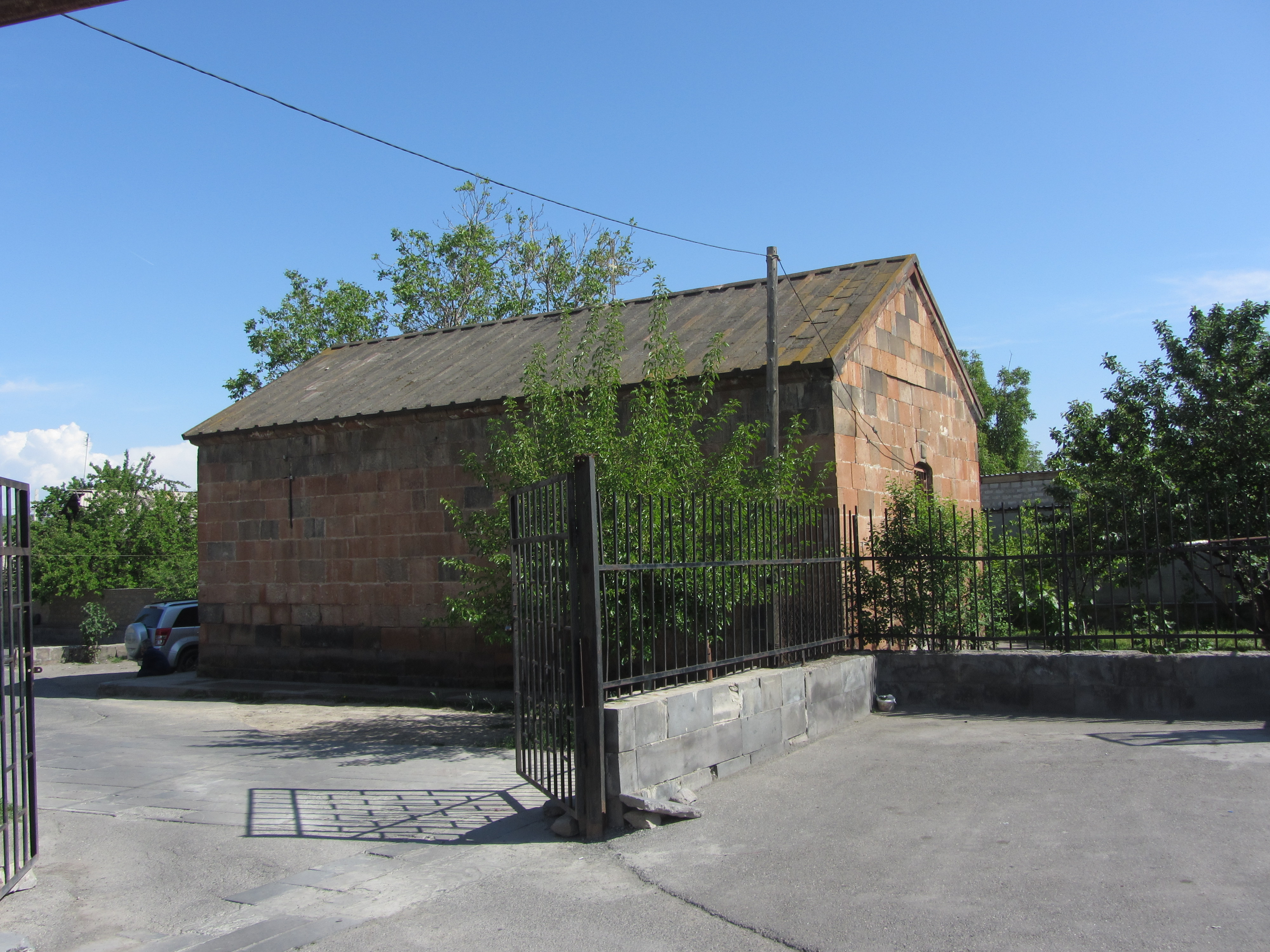
Surp Kiraki Church, 19th century

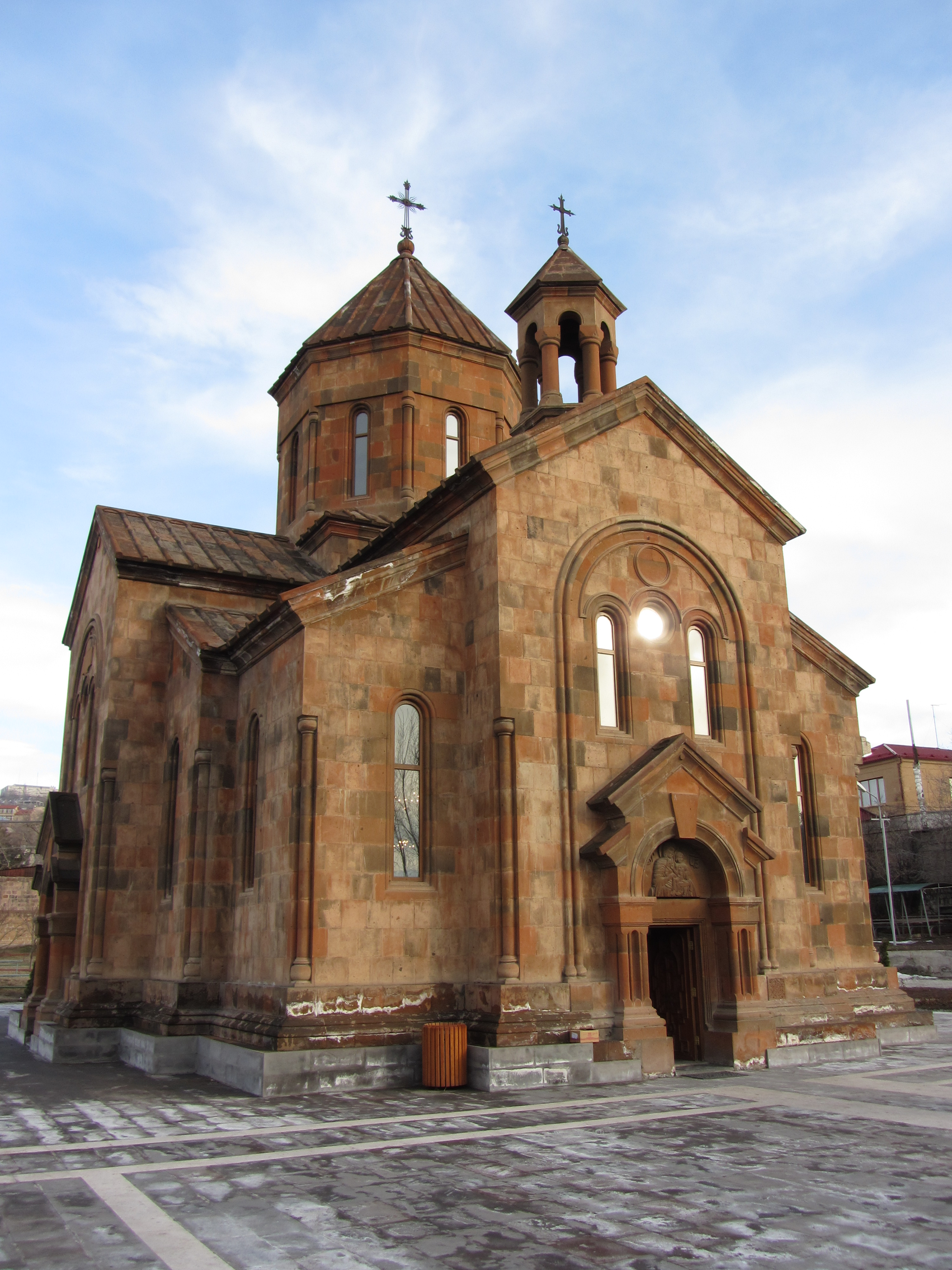
Holy Mother of God Church of Nork-Marash, 1995

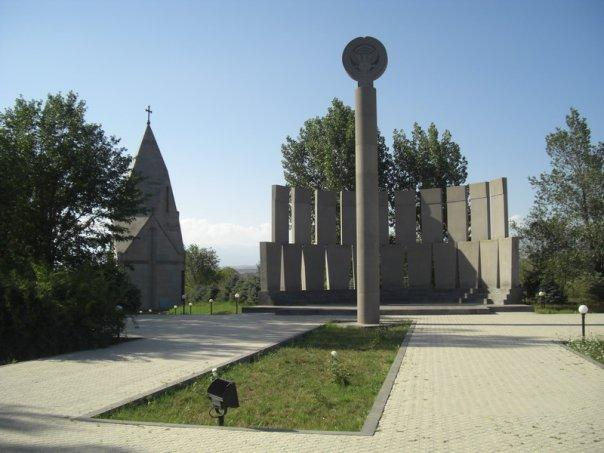
Holy Vartanants Martyrs Church of Yerablur, 1998

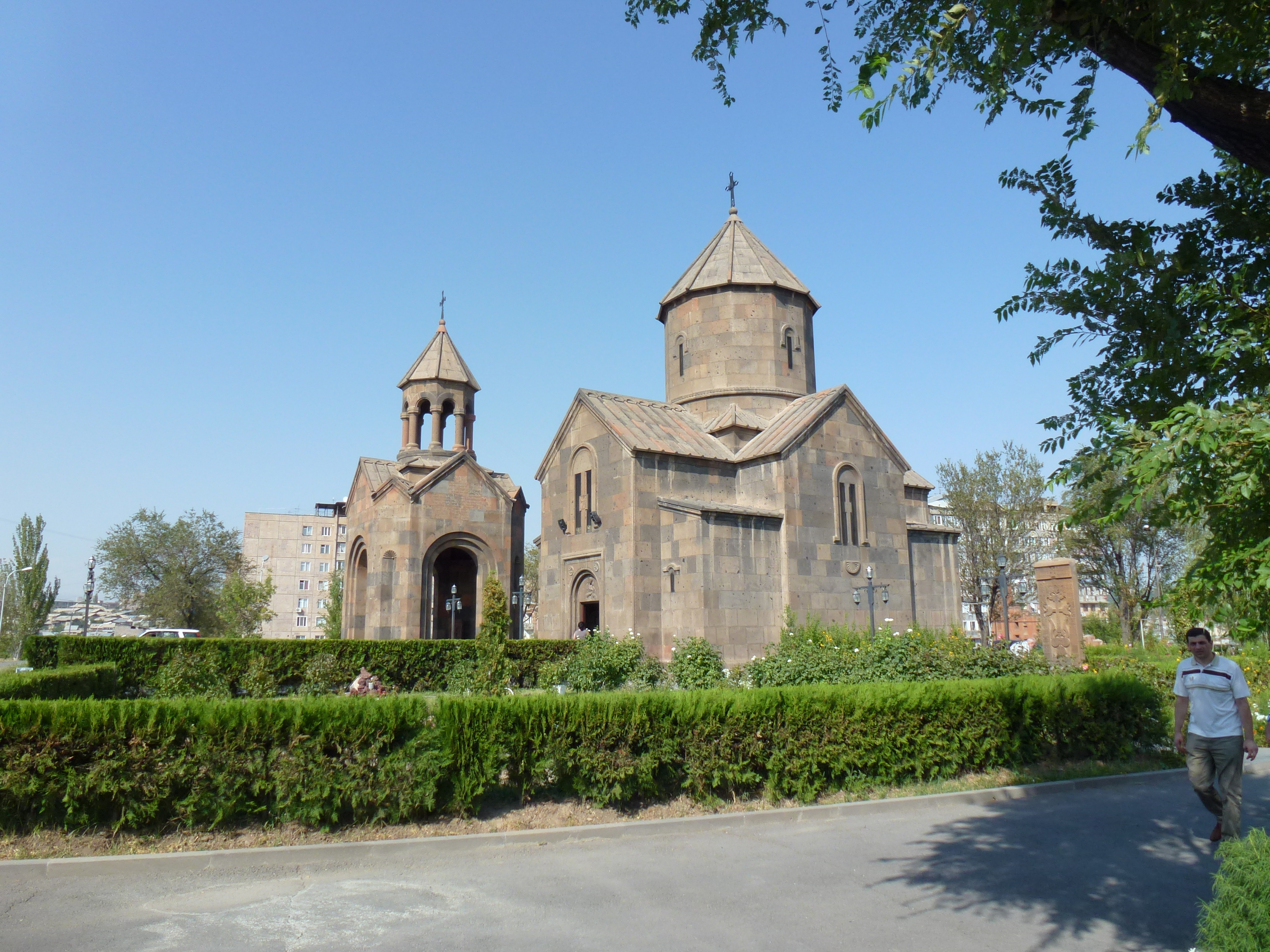
Holy Mother of God Church of Malatia-Sebastia, 1998

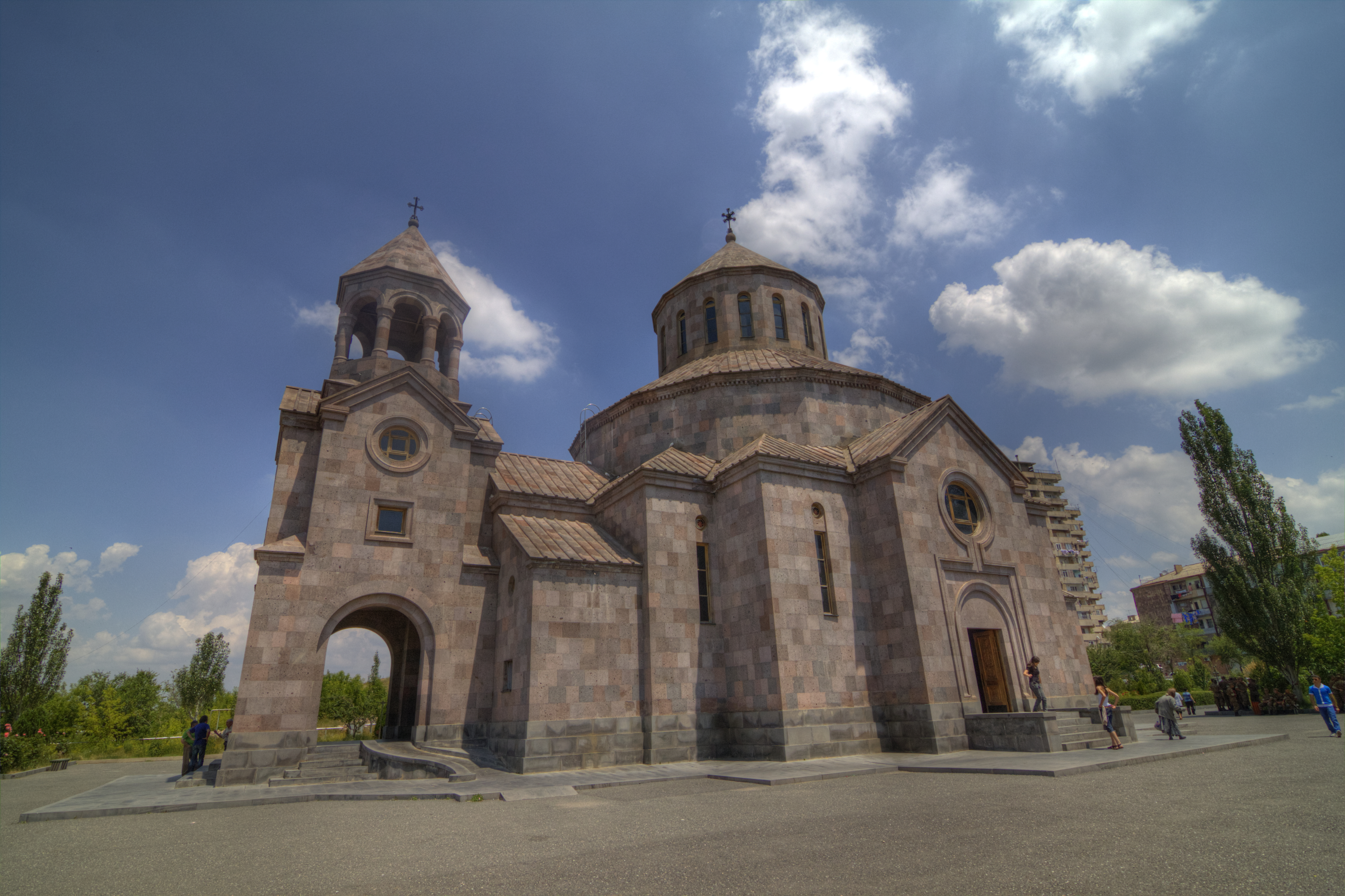
Saint Sarkis Church of Nor Nork, 1999

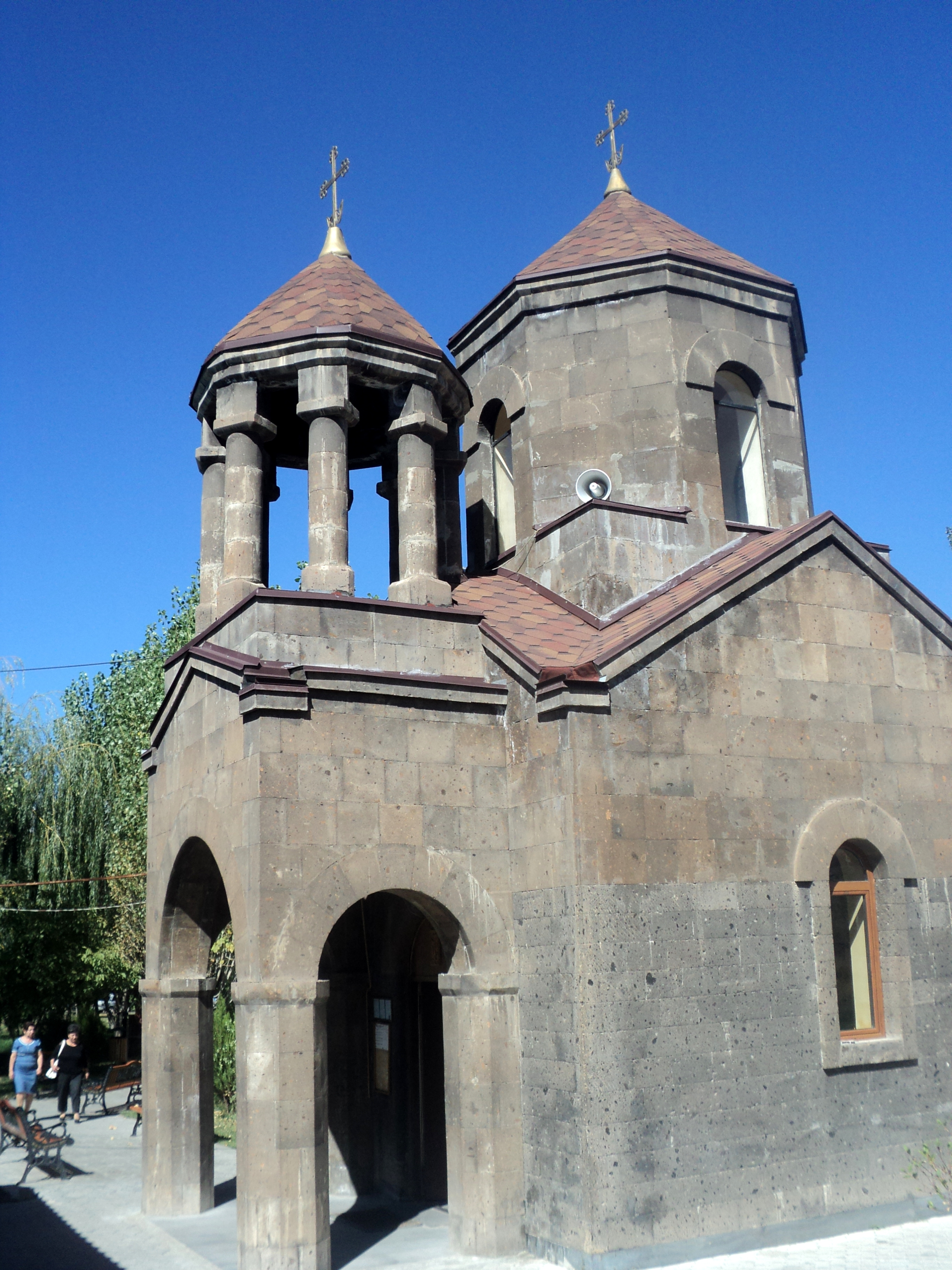
Holy Mother of God Church of Avan, Yerevan, 2002

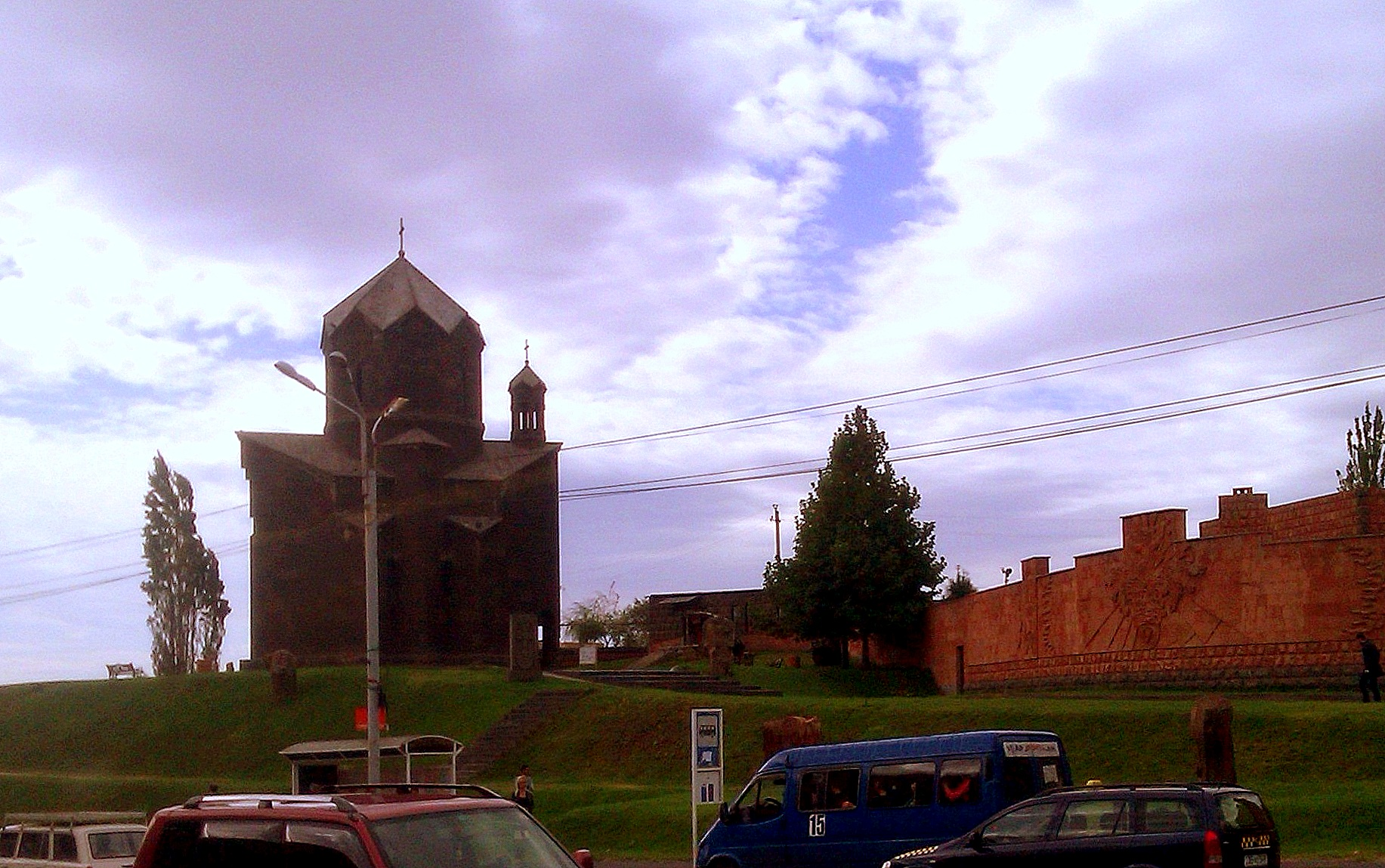
Holy Martyrs Church of Davtashen, 2003

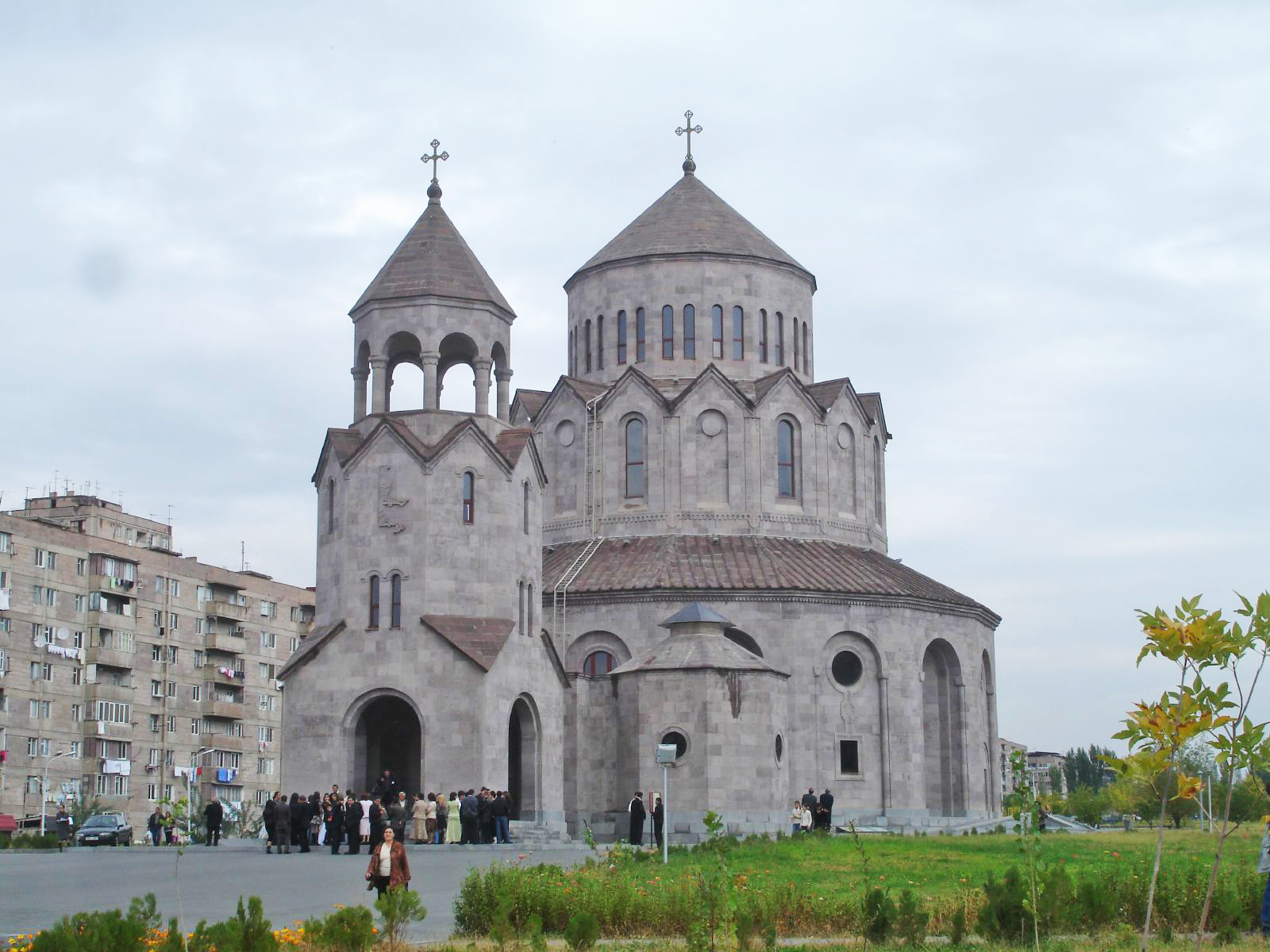
Holy Trinity Church, 2005

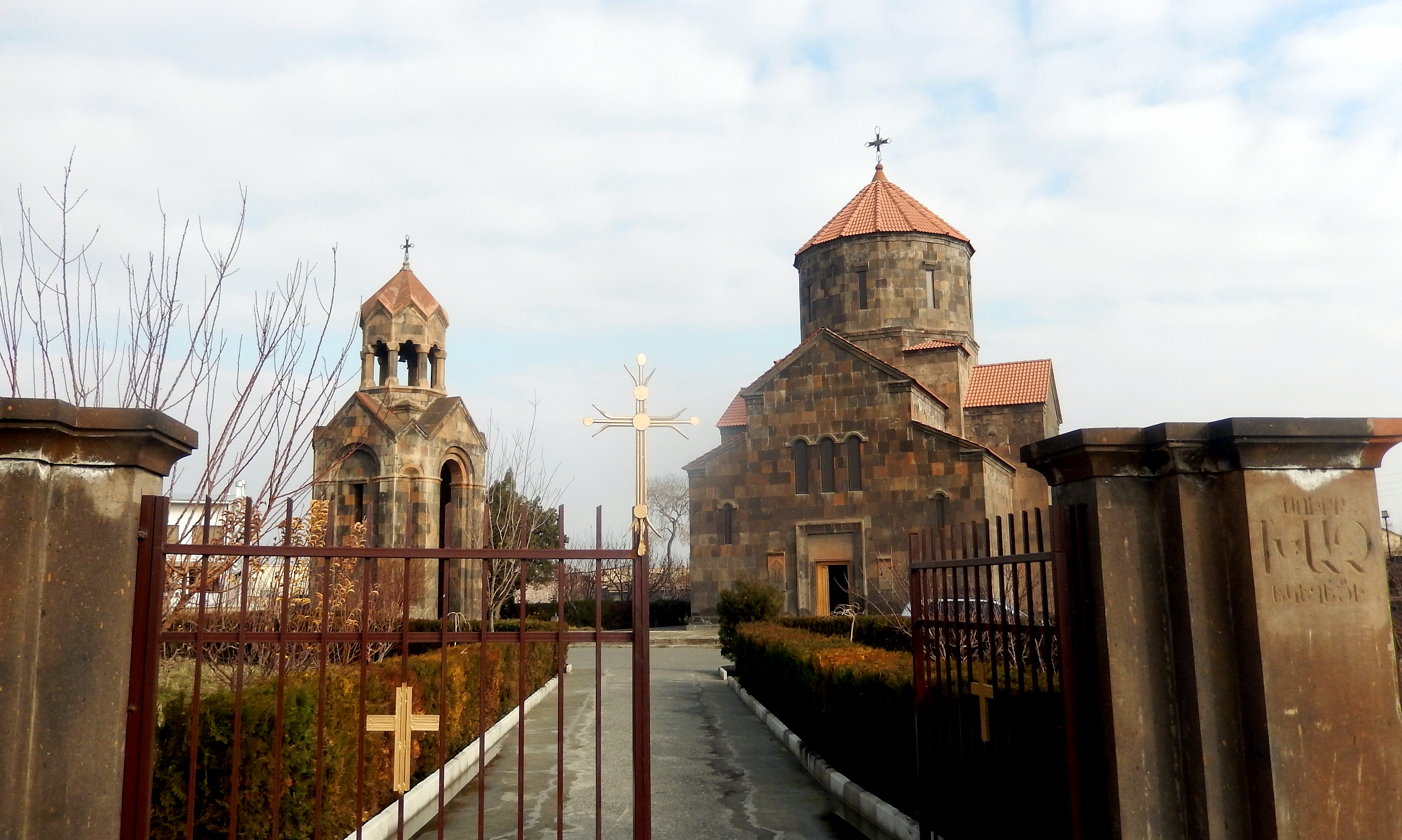
Surp Khach Church of Charbakh, 2006

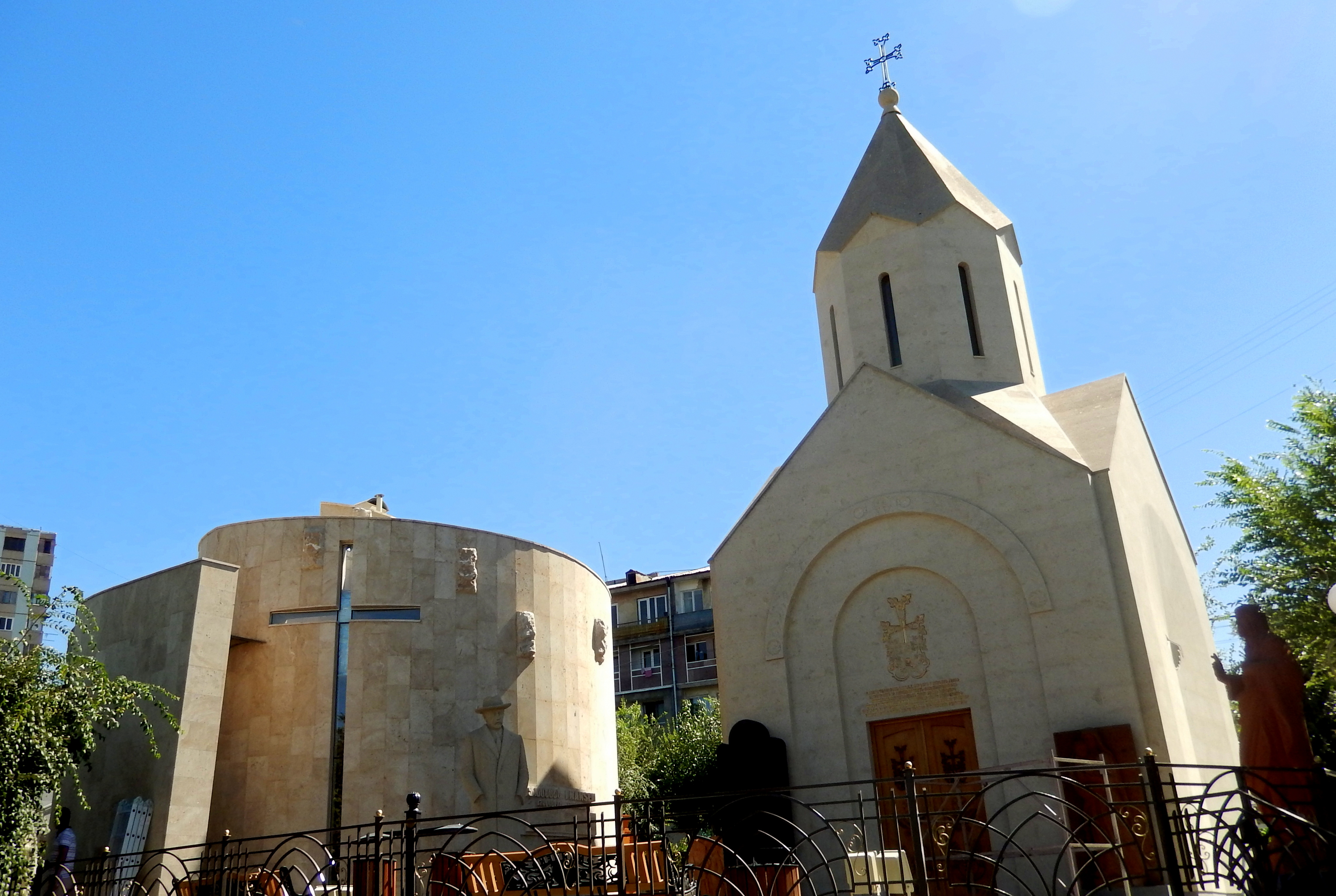
Holy Mother of God Church of Nor Nork, 2014

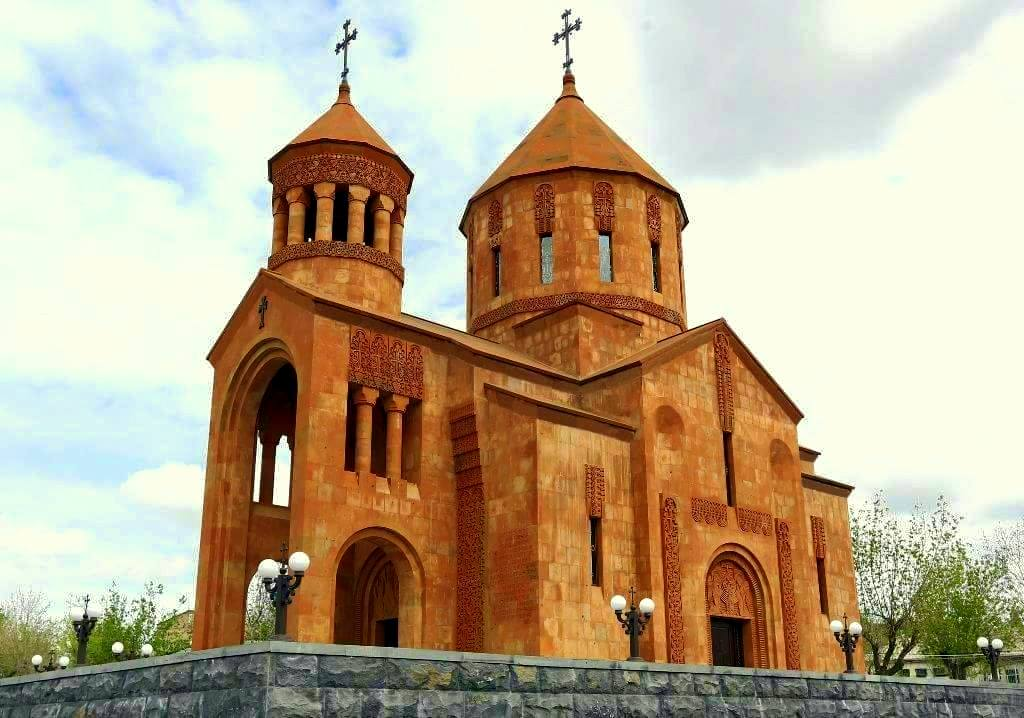
Holy Martyrs Church of Nubarashen, 2015

In Ararat Province

- Surp Hakob Church, Ararat village, 1866
- Saint Gregory Church, Byuravan, mid 19th century, rebuilt in 1999
- Holy Mother of God Church, Dimitrov, 1868
- Holy Mother of God Church, Verin Artashat, 19th century
- Surp Hovhannes Church, Mkhchyan, 1890
- Holy Mother of God Church, Dalar, 1890
- Surp Sarkis Church, Argavand, 1897
- Surp Hakob Church, Mrgavan, 1905
- Saint George's Church, Kanachut, 1908
- Holy Mother of God Church, Vedi, 2000
- Surp Harutyun Church, Nerkin Dvin, 2000
- Saint George's Church, Marmarashen, 2002
- Holy Mother of God Church, Arevshat, 2006
- Holy Mother of God Church, Shahumyan, 2009
- Saint George's Church, Masis, 2009
- Holy Mother of God Church, Norabats, 2014
- Saint John the Evangelist's Church, Artashat 2015
- Saint Thaddeus Church, Masis, 2015
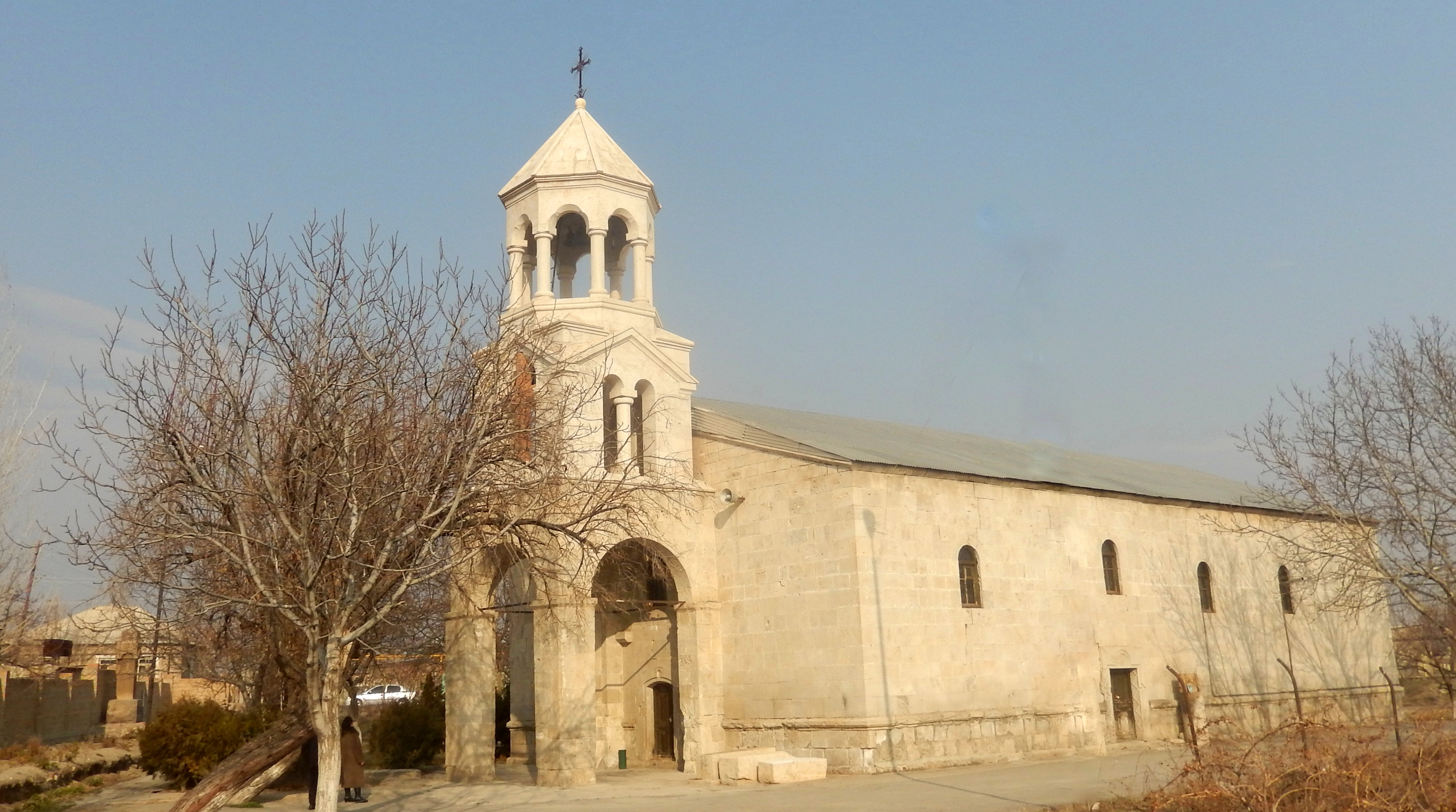
Surp Hakob Church, Ararat village, 1866

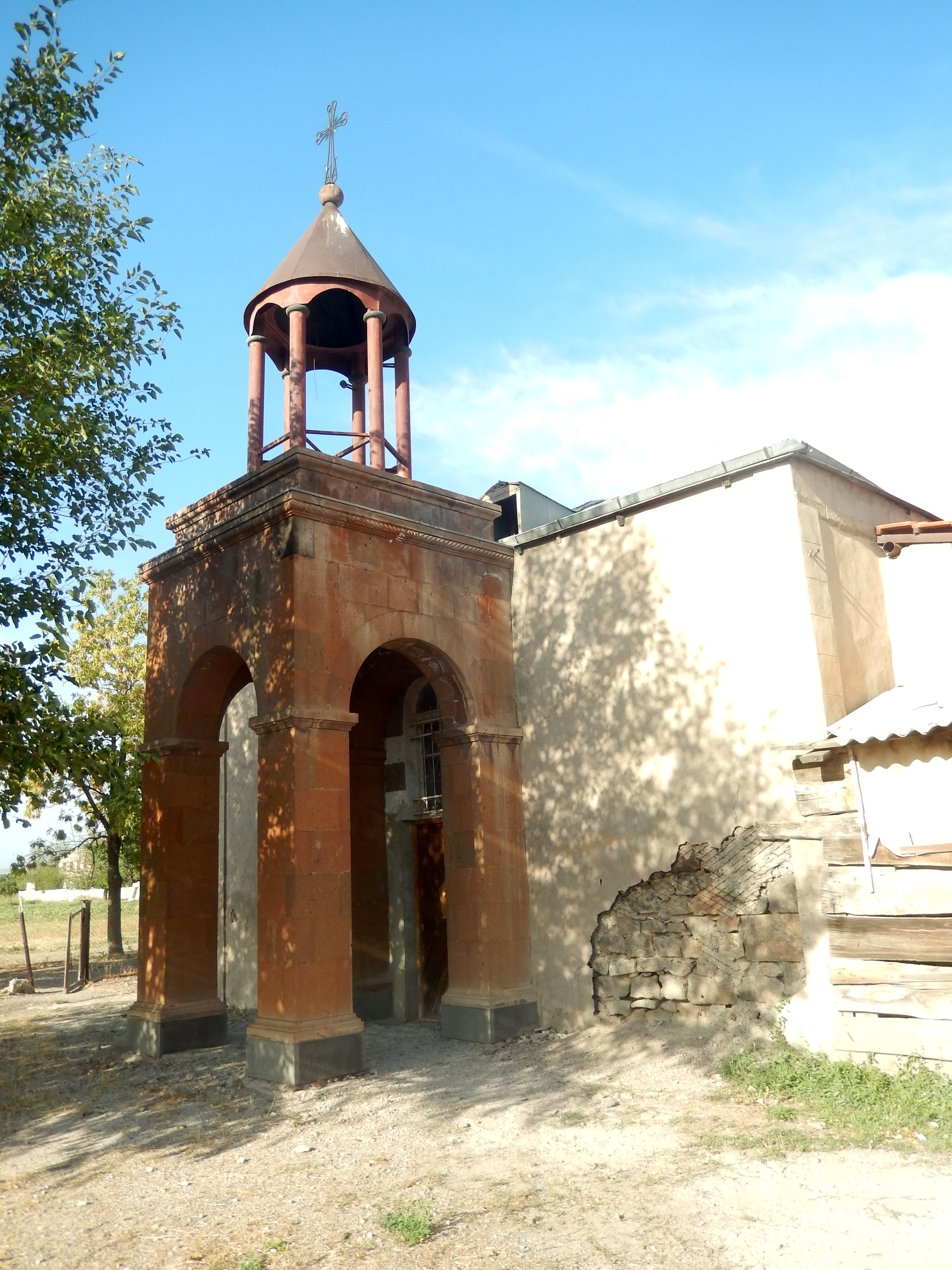
Holy Mother of God Church, Dimitrov, 1868

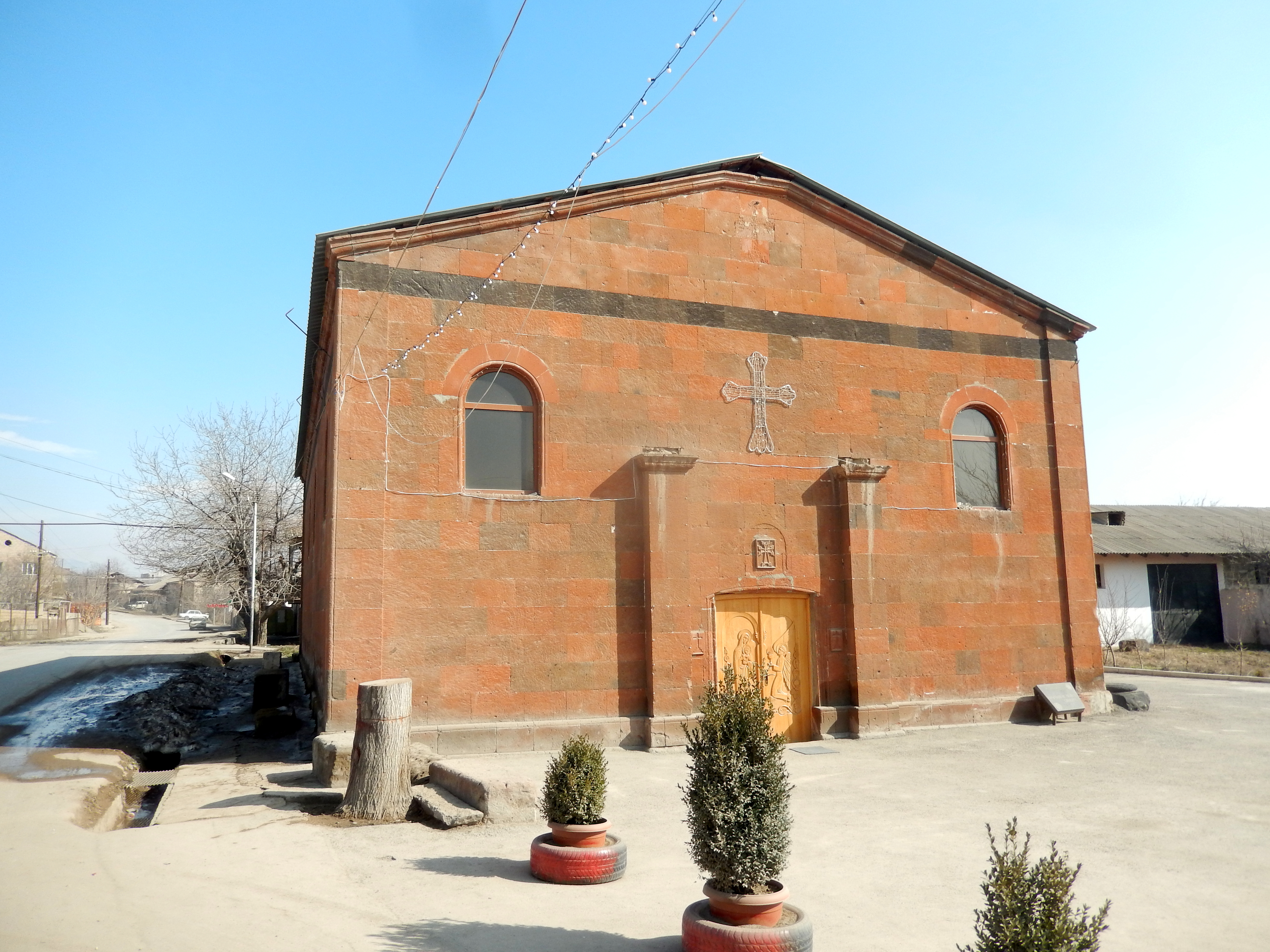
Holy Mother of God Church, Verin Artashat, 19th century

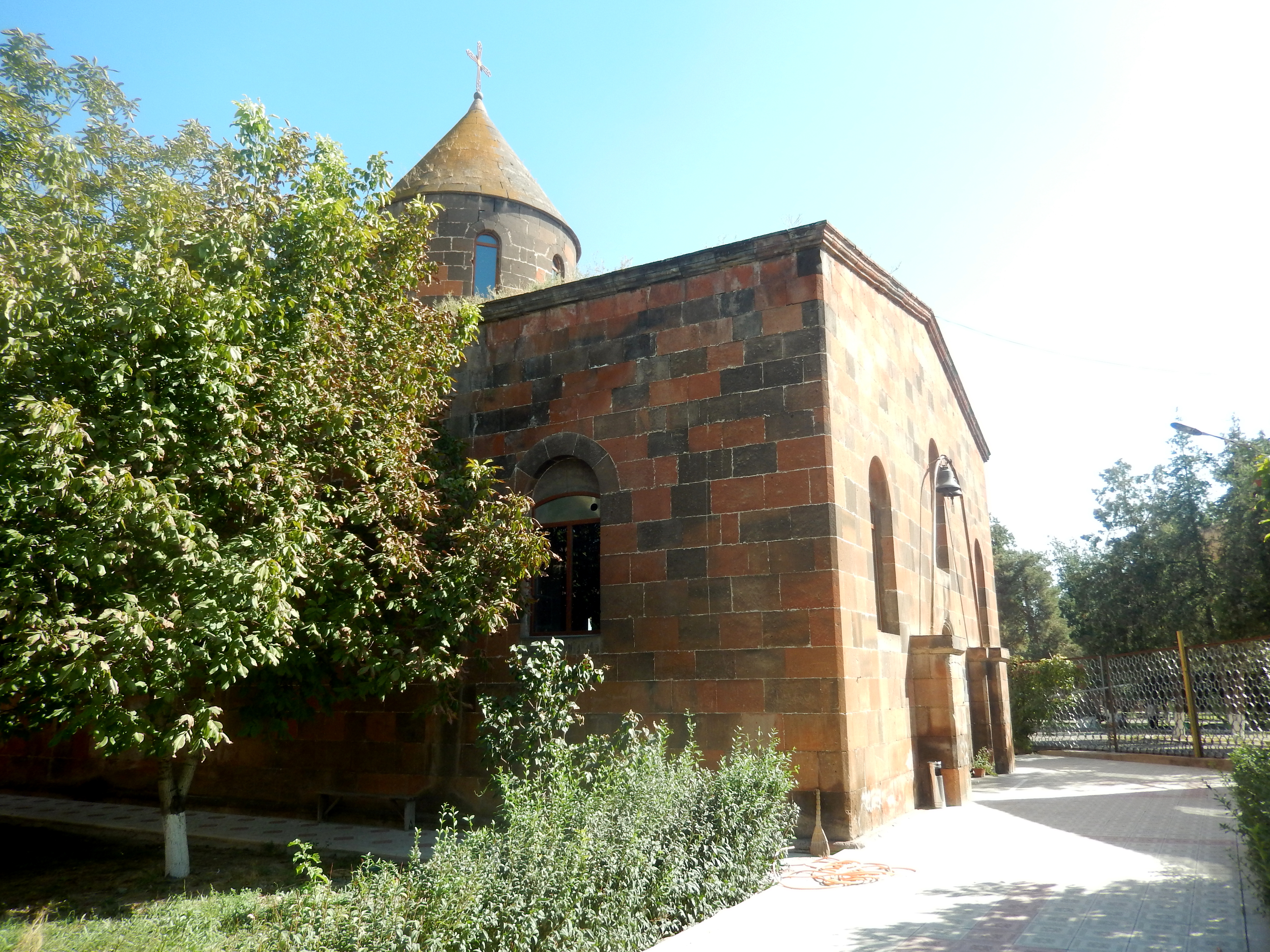
Holy Mother of God Church, Dalar, 1890

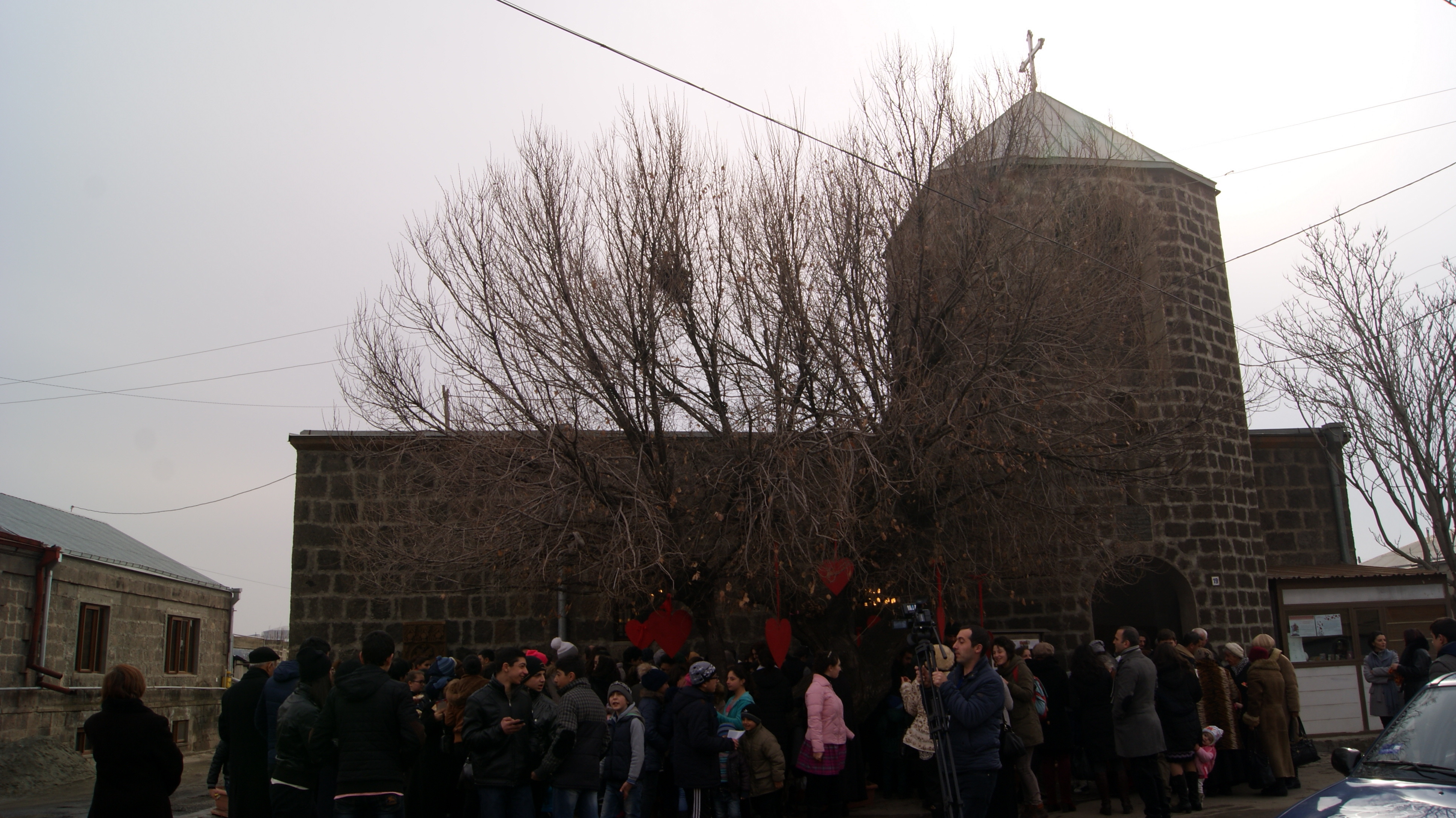
Surp Sarkis Church, Argavand, 1897

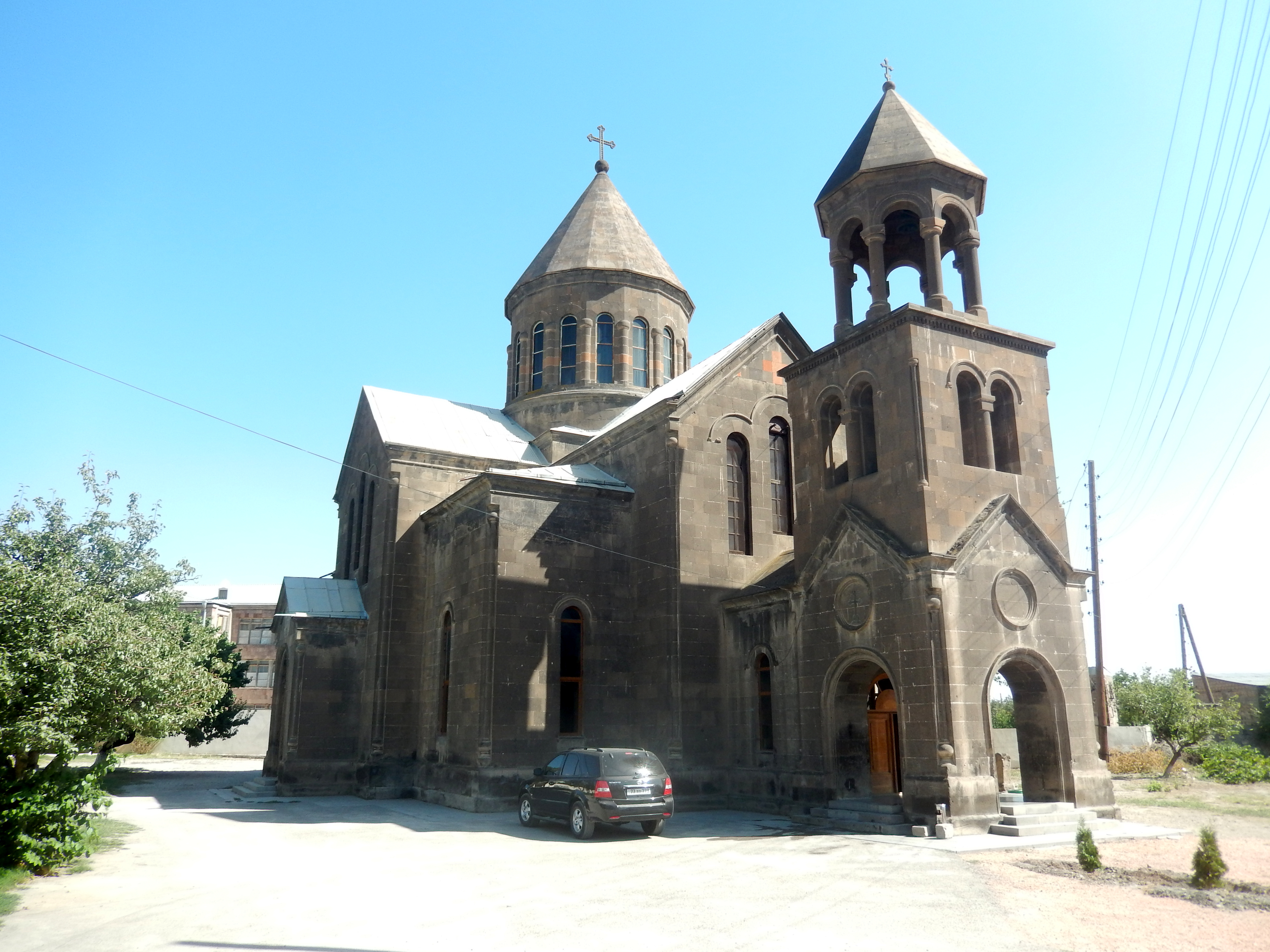
Surp Hakob Church, Mrgavan, 1905

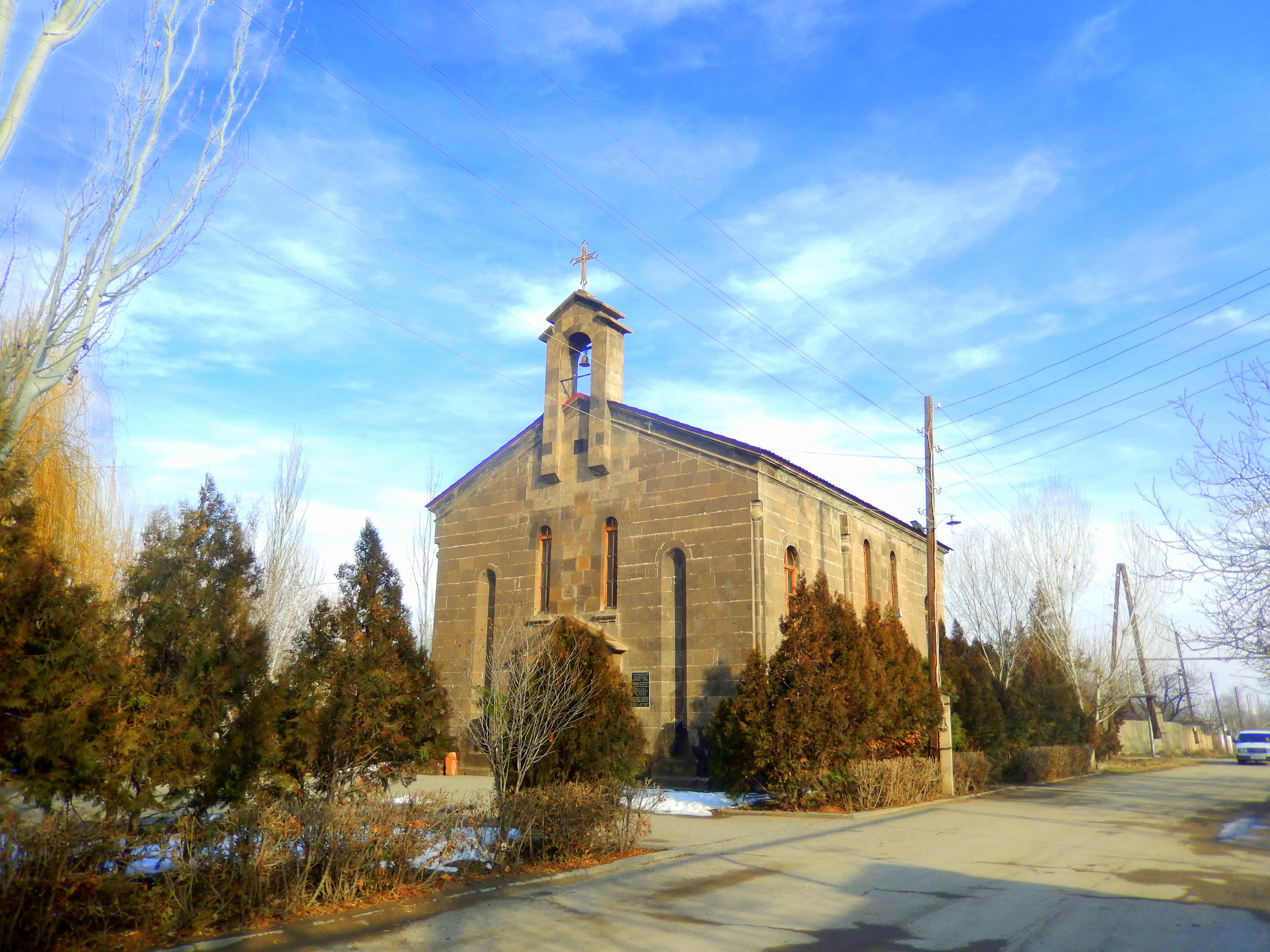
*Saint George's Church, Kanachut, 1908

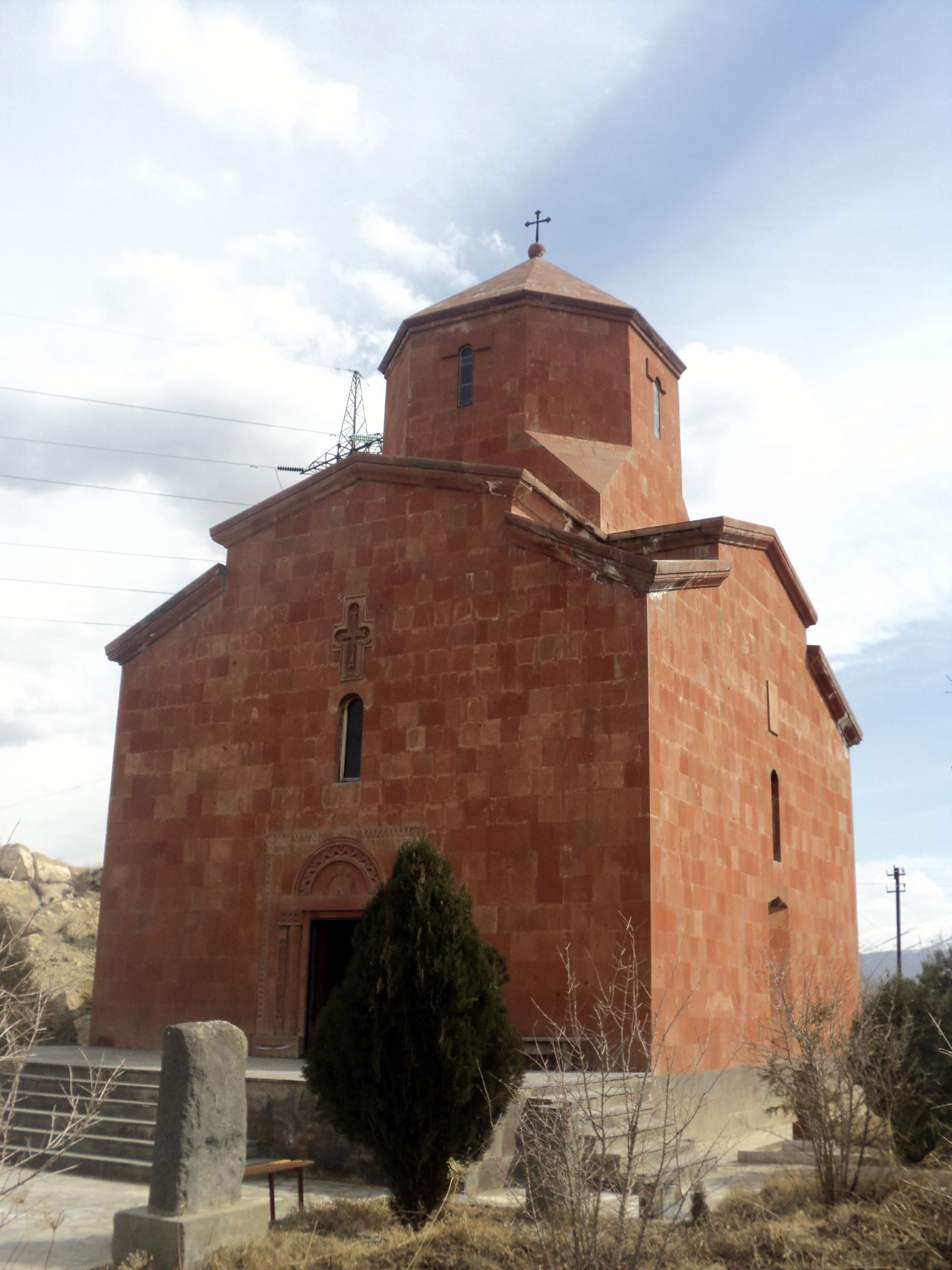
Holy Mother of God Church, Vedi, 2000

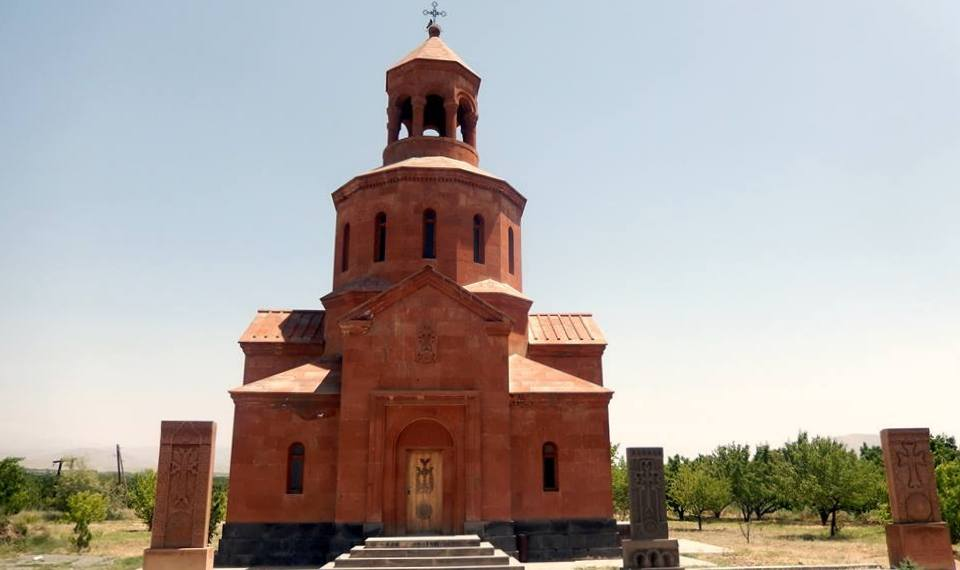
Surp Harutyun Church, Nerkin Dvin, 2000

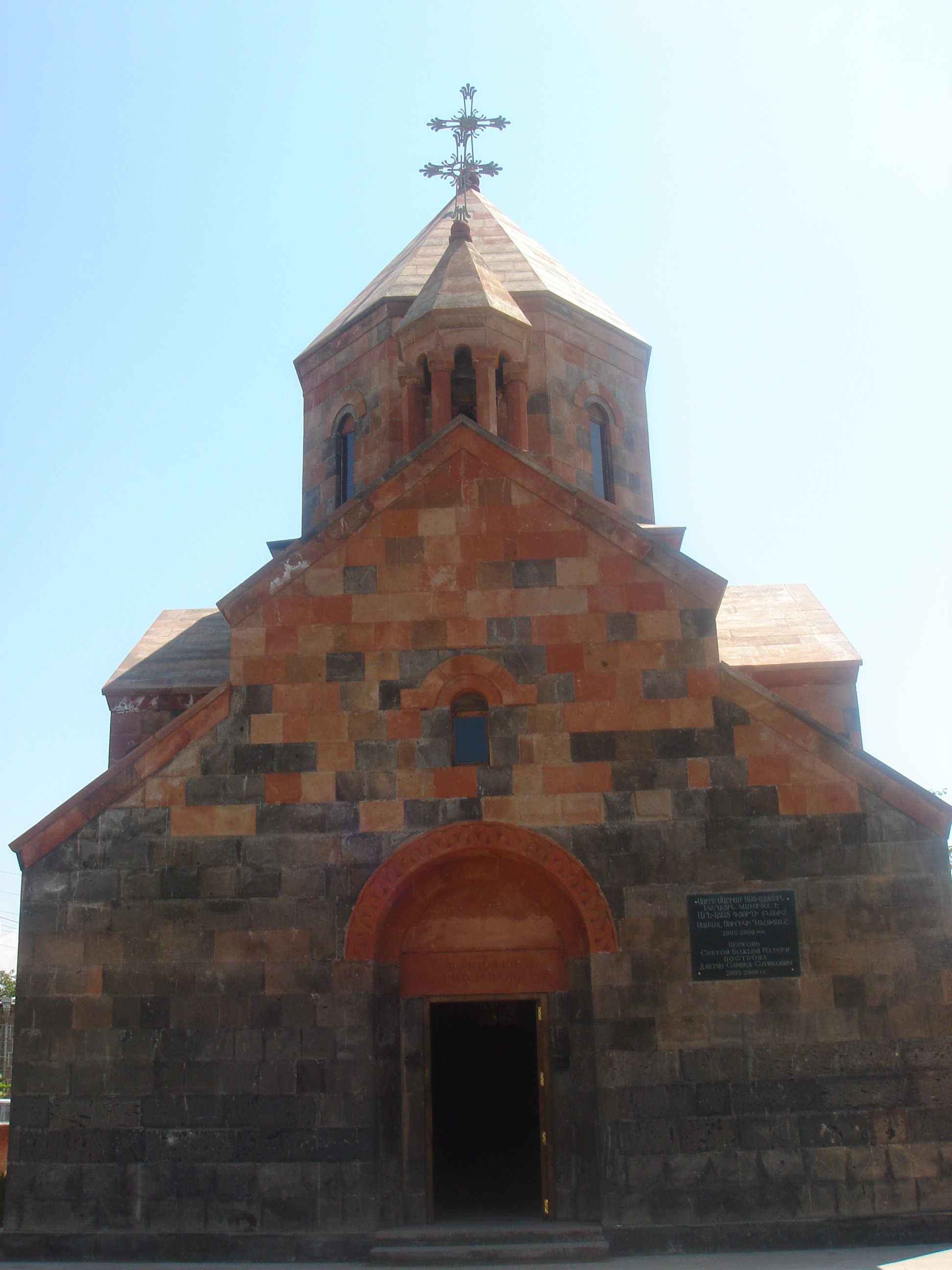
Holy Mother of God Church, Arevshat, 2006

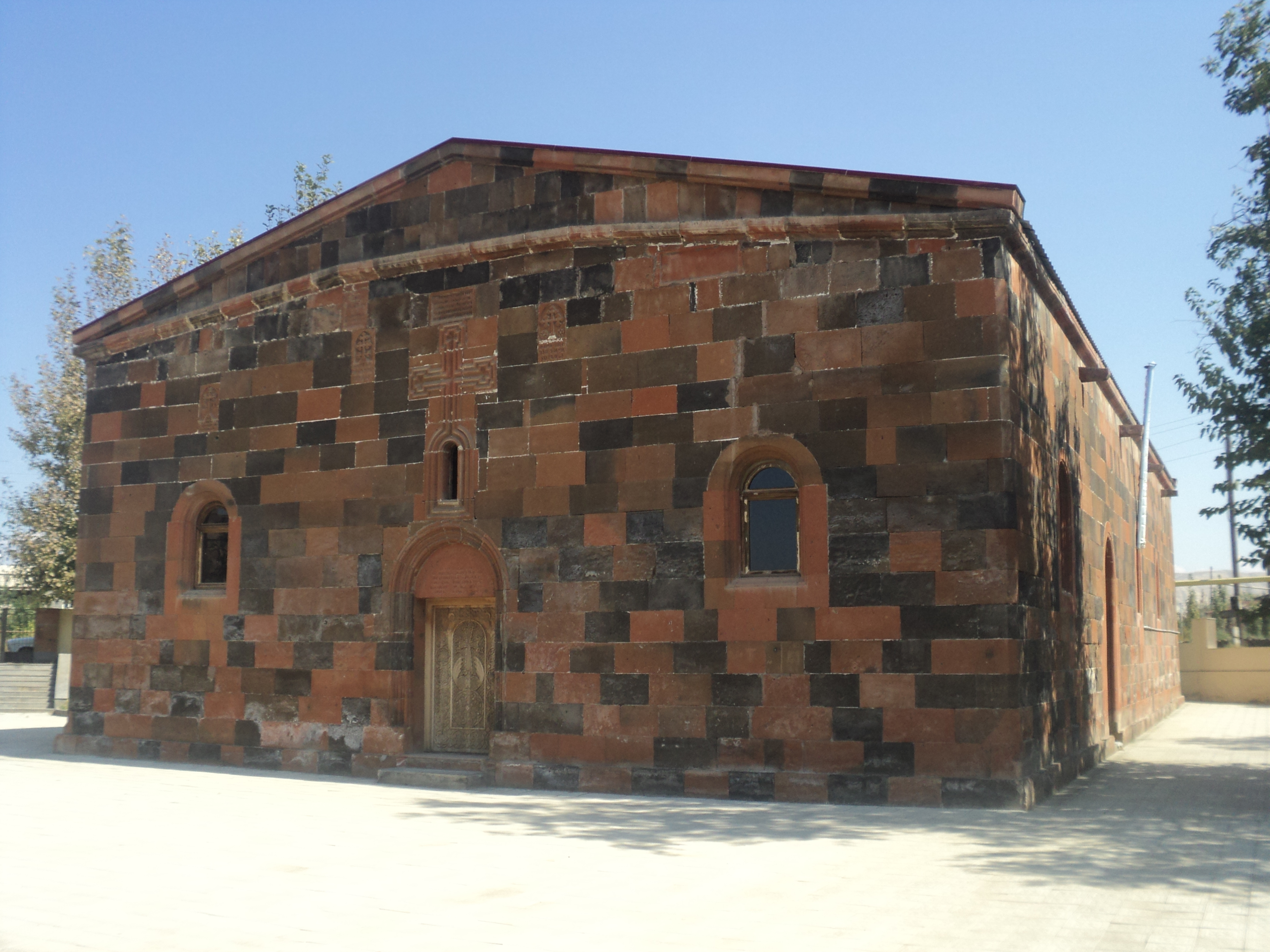
Holy Mother of God Church, Shahumyan, 2009

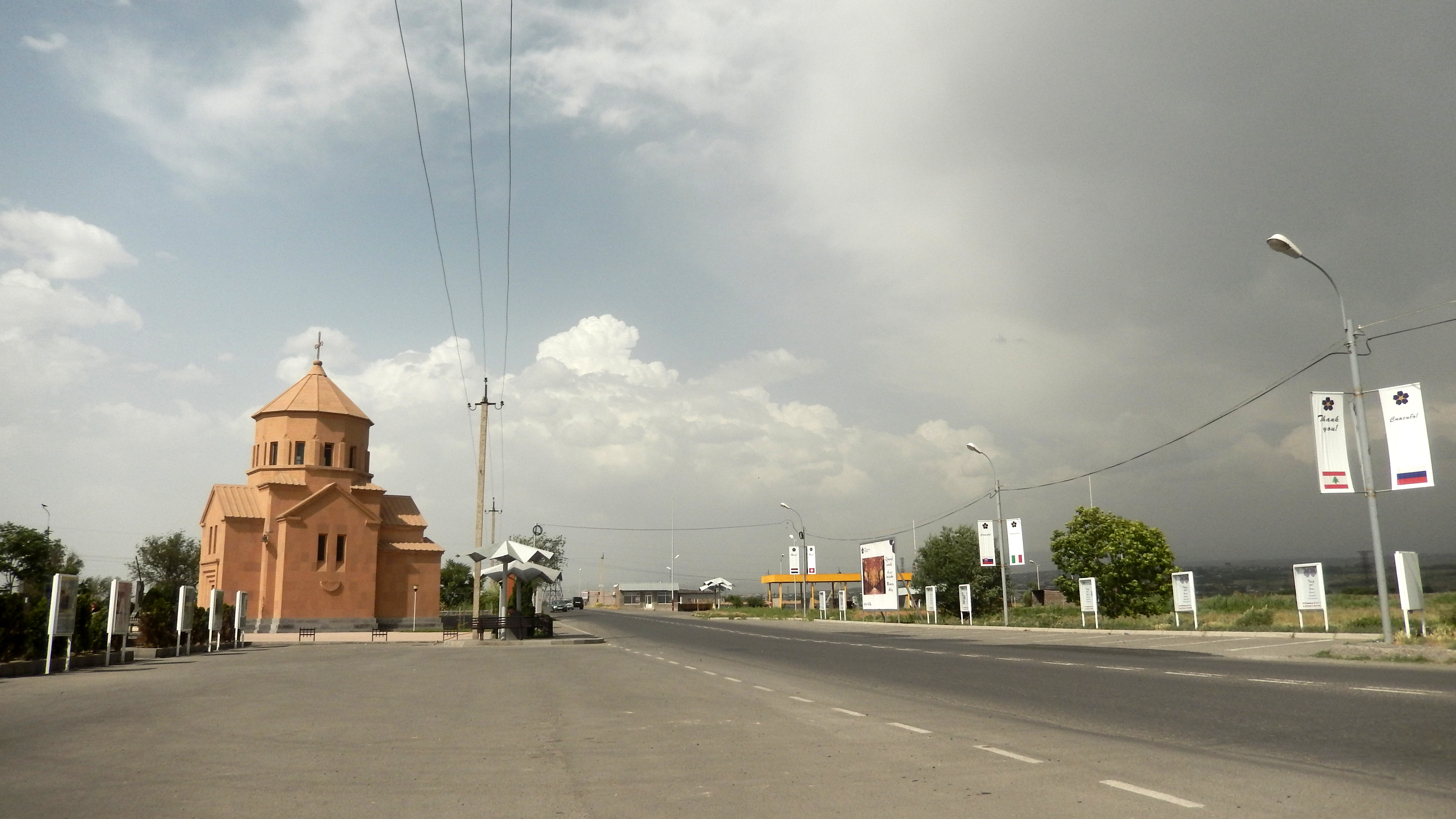
Saint George's Church, Masis, 2009

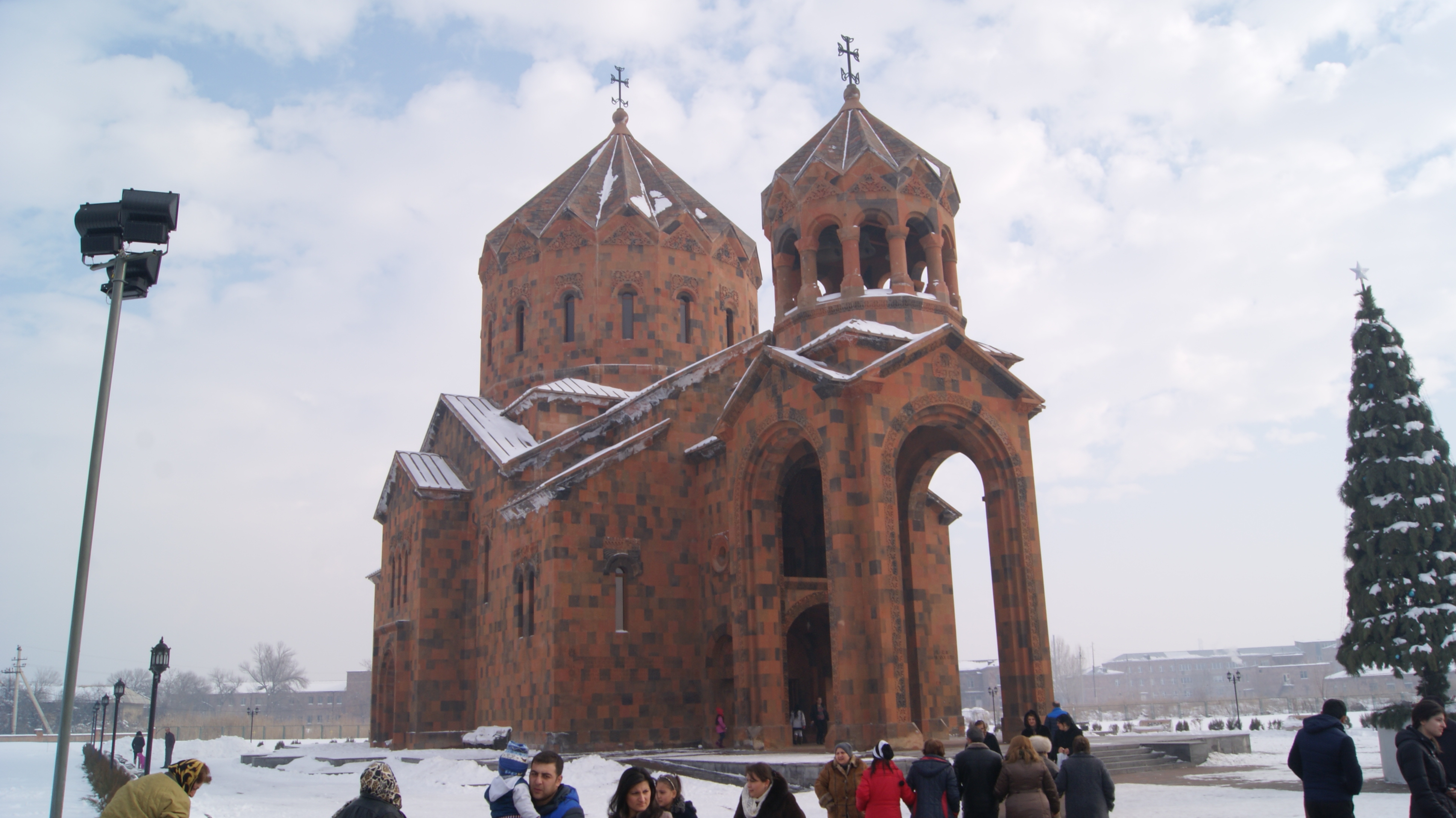
Saint John the Evangelist's Church, Artashat, 2015

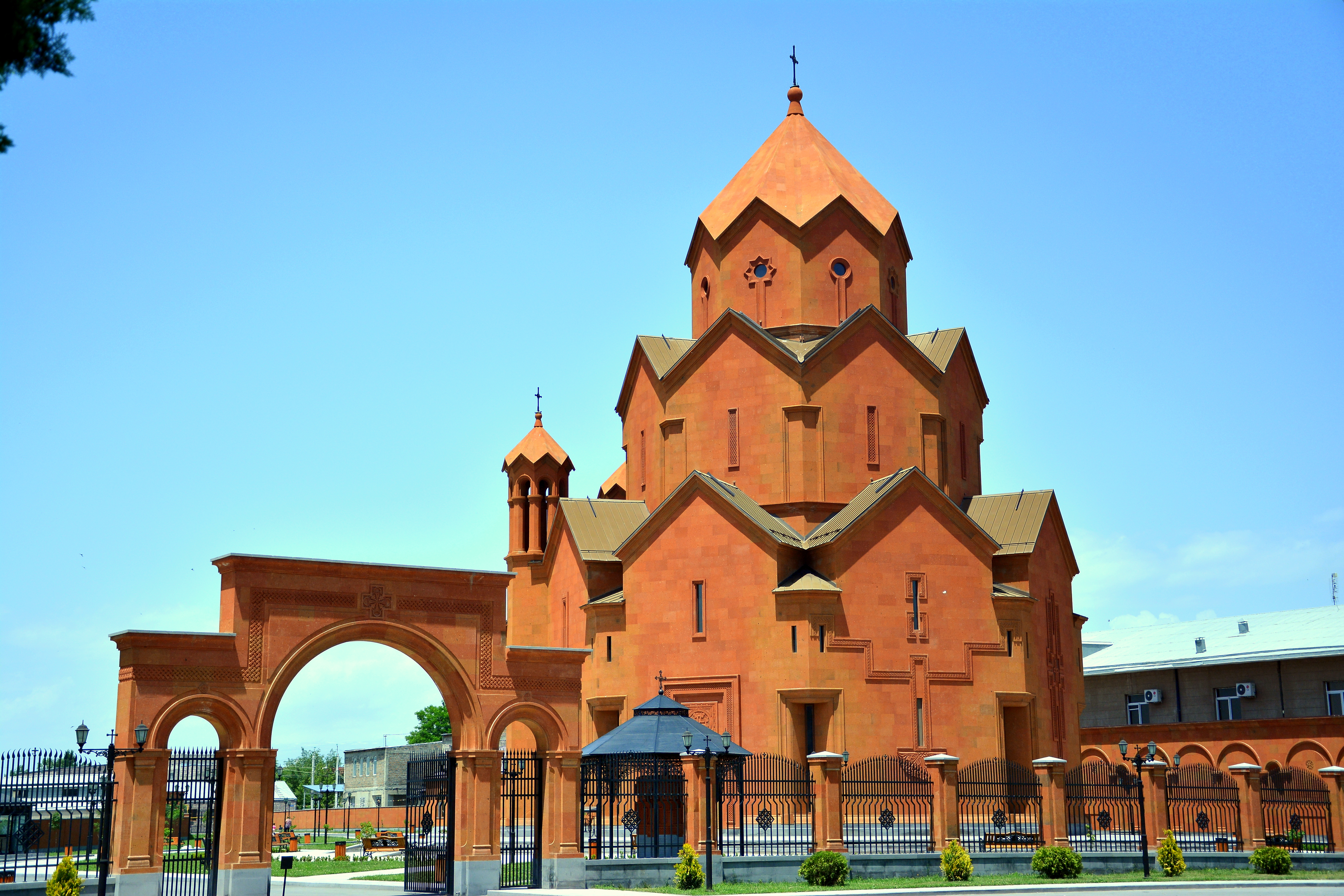
Saint Thaddeus Church, Masis, 2015

=== Chapels ===
- Saint Ananias' Chapel, Yerevan, 1889
- Surp Khach Zoravor Chapel, Yerevan, 1991
- Surp Karapet Chapel, Berkanush, rebuilt in 2006
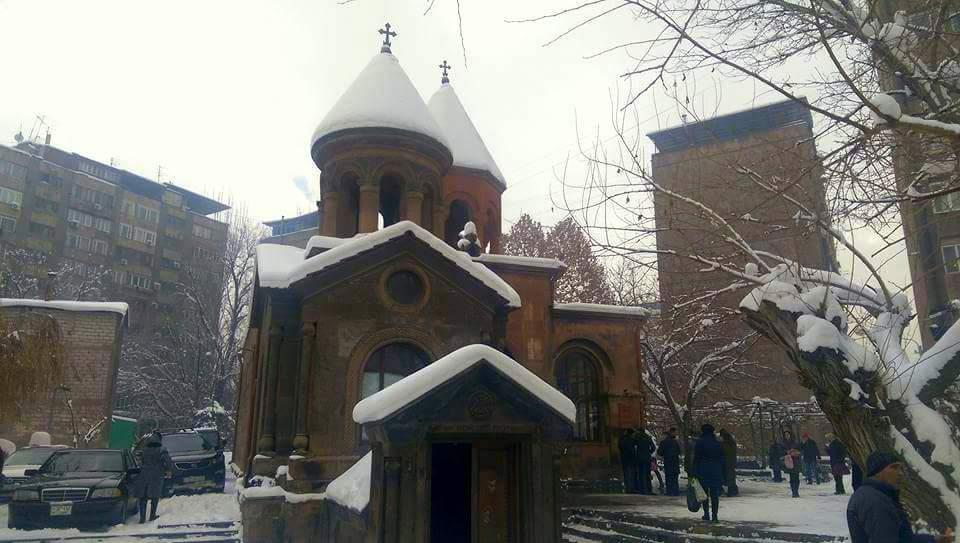
Saint Ananias' Chapel, Yerevan, 1889

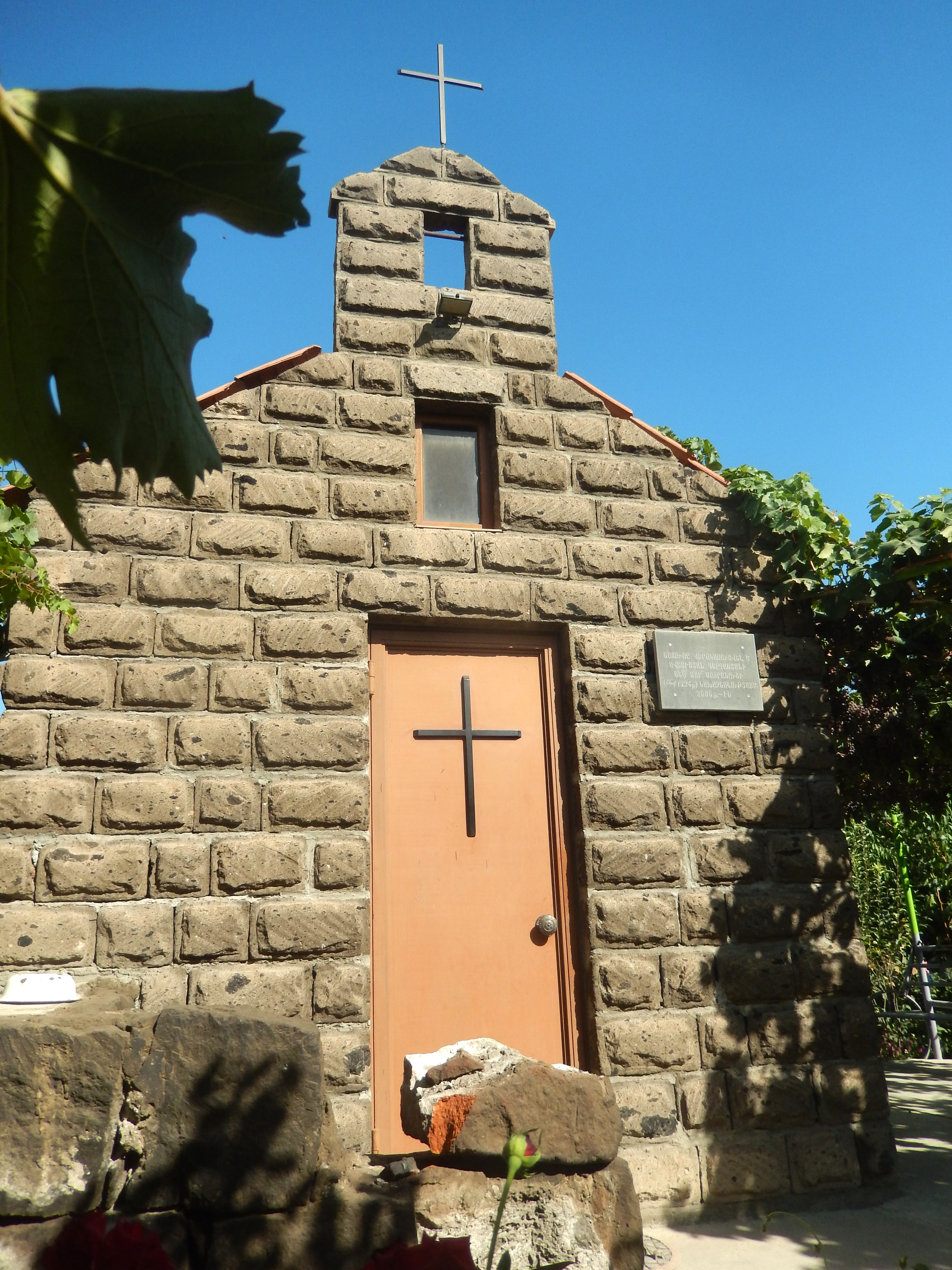
Surp Karapet Chapel, Berkanush, rebuilt in 2006

== Inactive/ruined churches and monasteries ==
This is an incomplete list of inactive or ruined churches and monasteries in the territory regulated by the Araratian Pontifical Diocese:

- Holy Mother of God Chapel of Avan, Yerevan, 4th century
- Katoghike Tsiranavor Church of Avan, Yerevan, 591
- Surp Hovhannes Chapel of Avan, Yerevan, 12-13th centuries
- Aghjots Vank near Goght and Garni, 13th century
- Hovhannes Karapet Monastery near Lusashogh, 13th century
- Holy Mother of God Church of Kanaker, Yerevan, 1695
- Holy Mother of God Parochial Church of Avan, Yerevan, 19th century
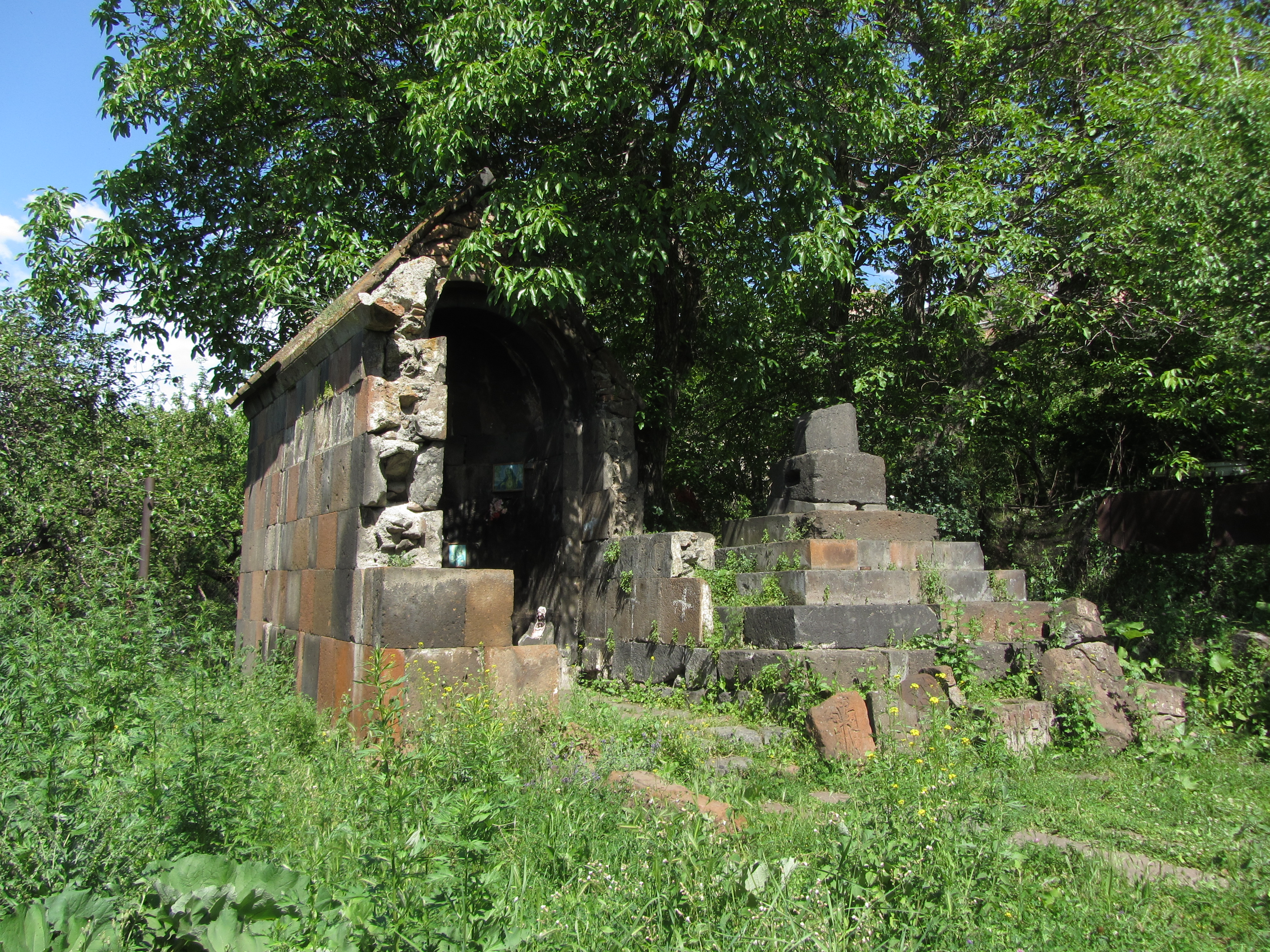
Holy Mother of God Chapel of Avan, Yerevan, 4th century

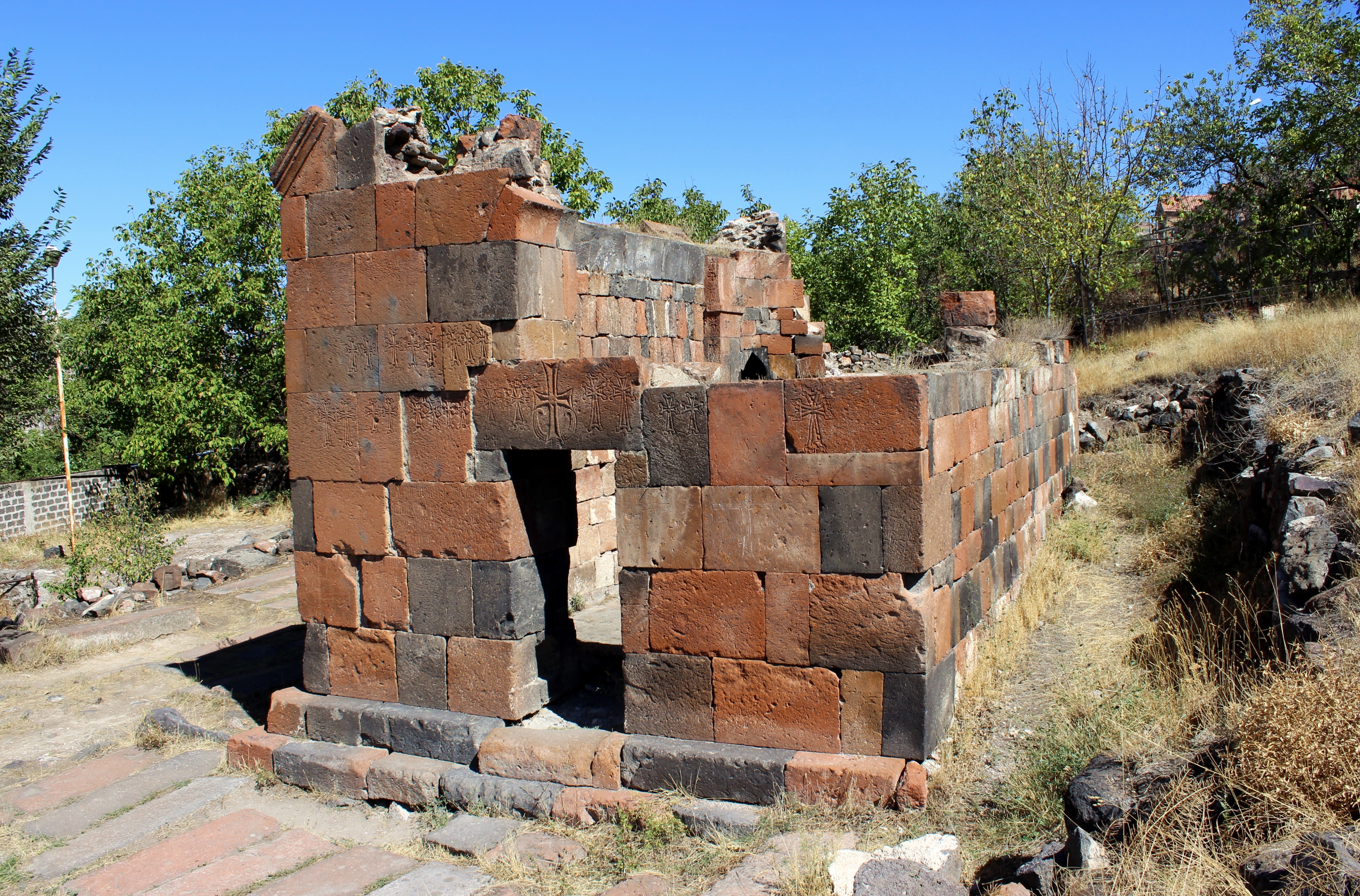
Surp Hovhannes Chapel of Avan, Yerevan, 5th century

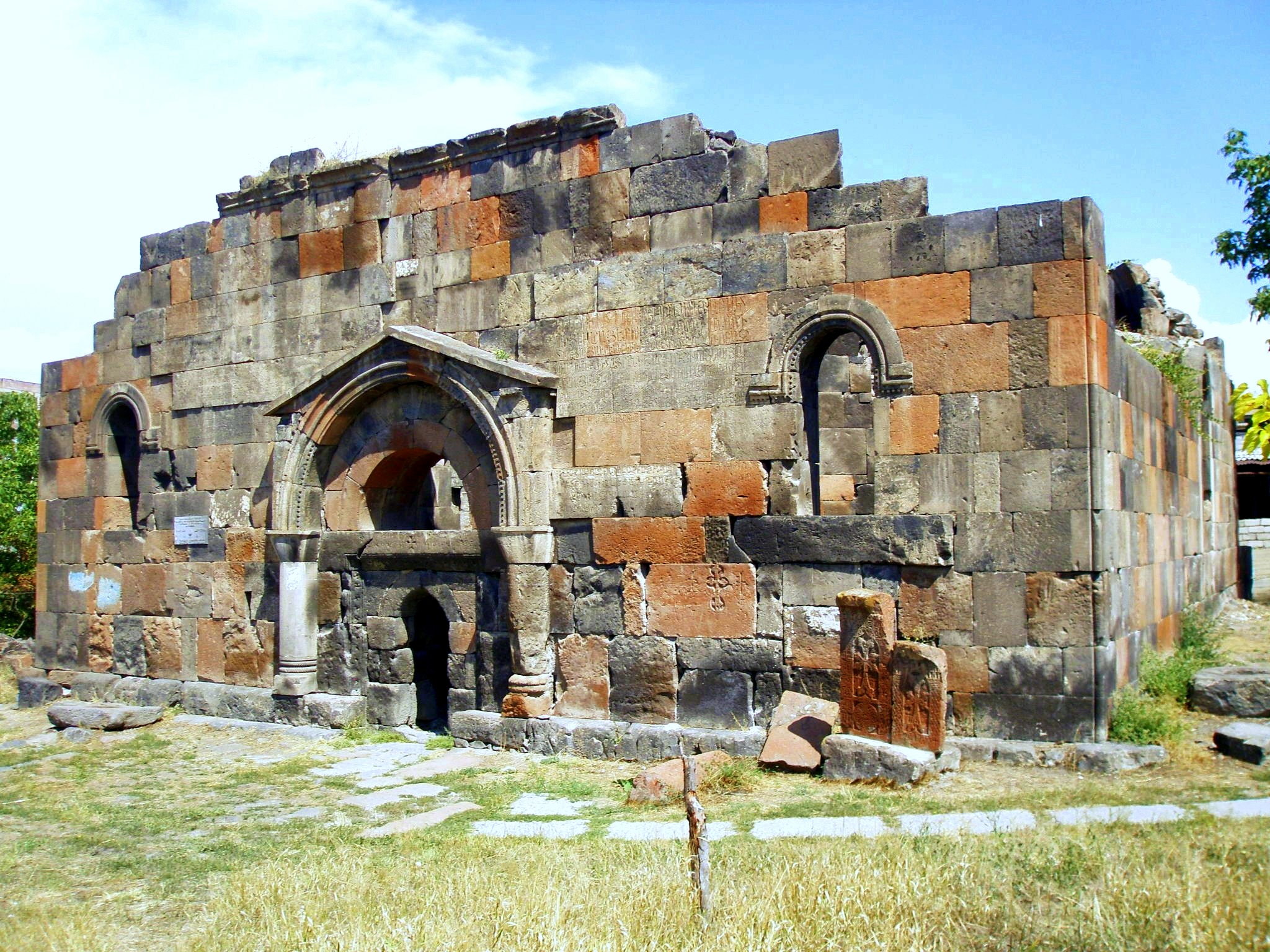
Katoghike Tsiranavor Church of Avan, Yerevan, 591

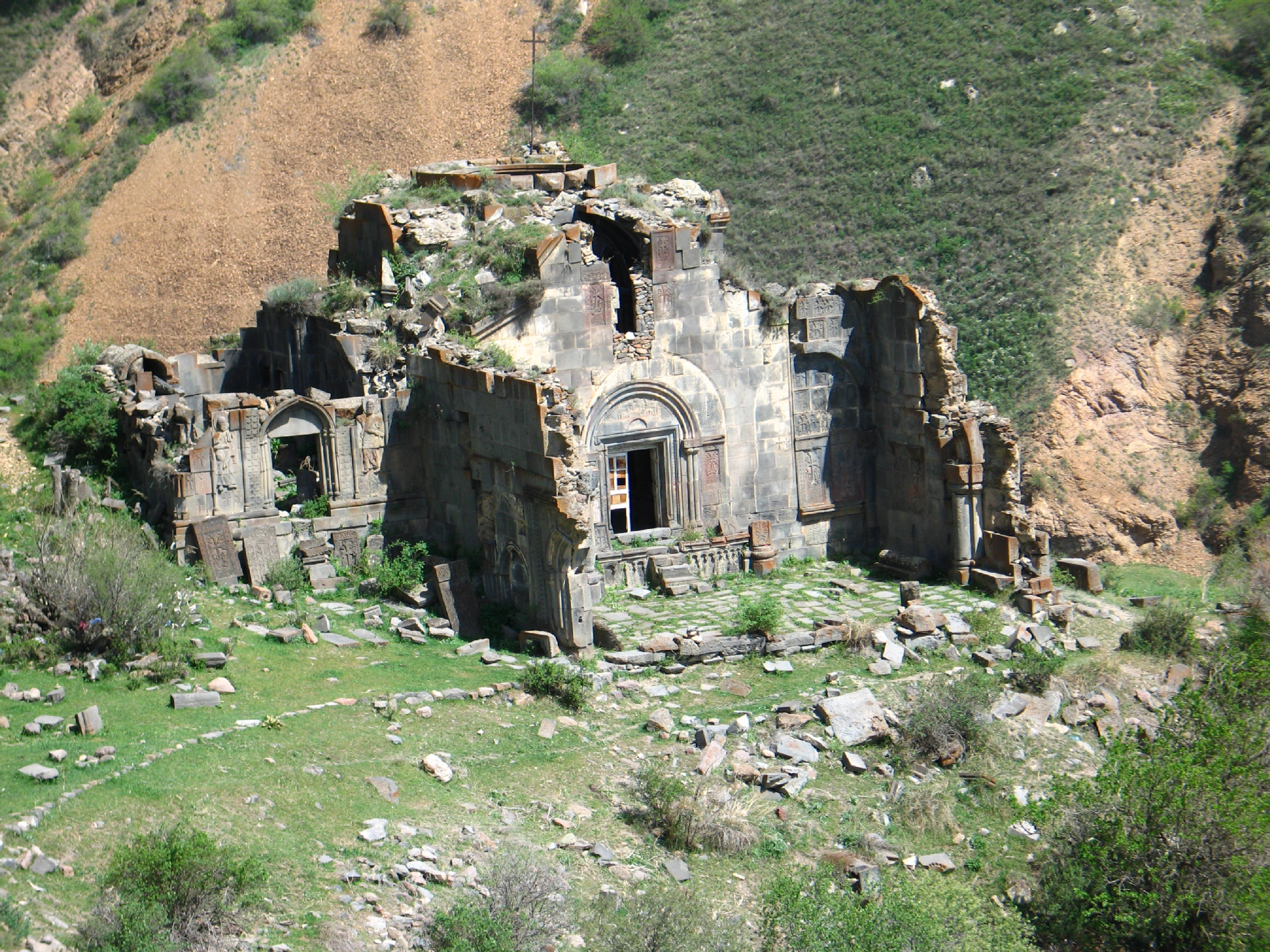
Aghjots Vank near Goght and Garni, 13th century

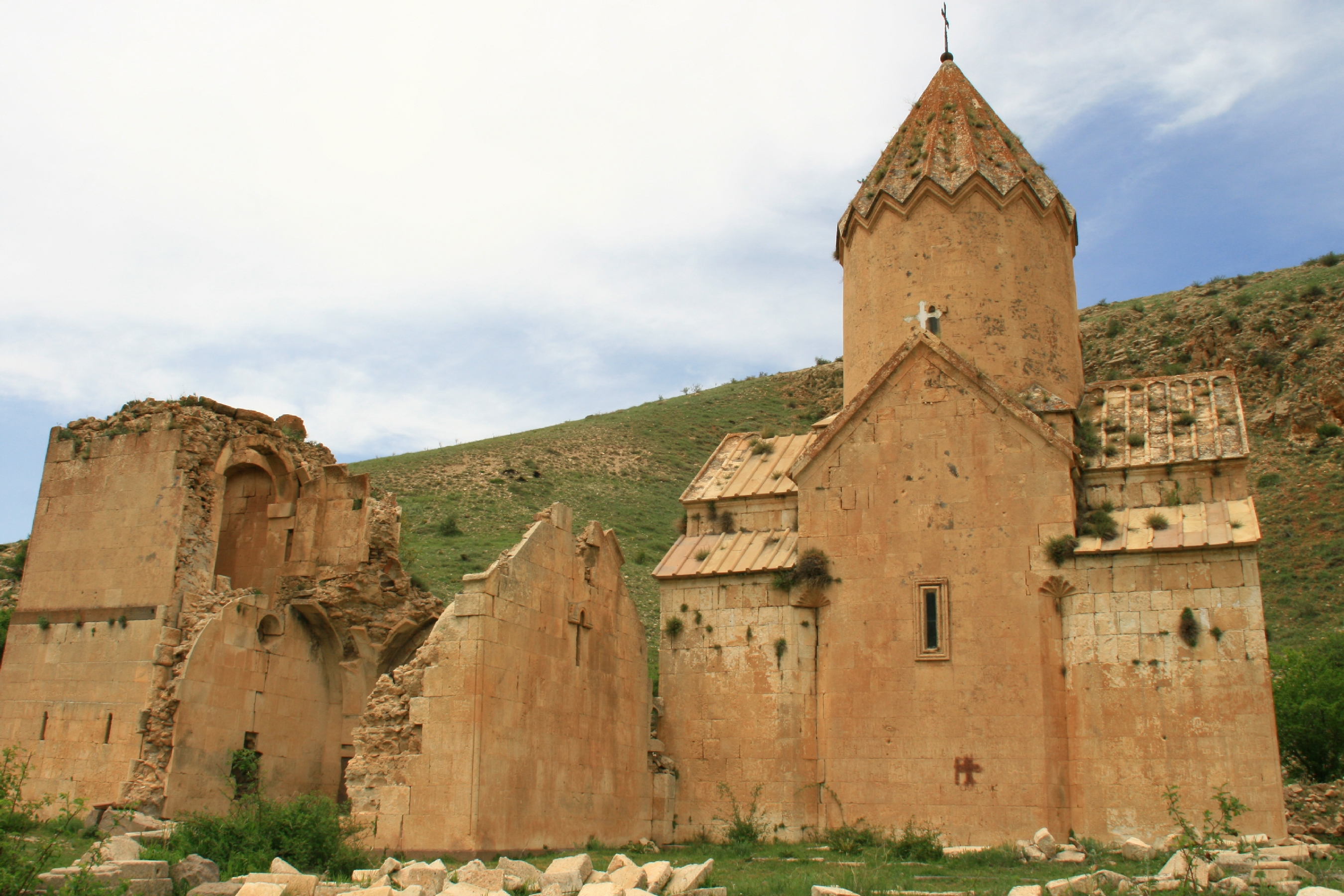
Hovhannes Karapet Monastery near Lusashogh, 13th century

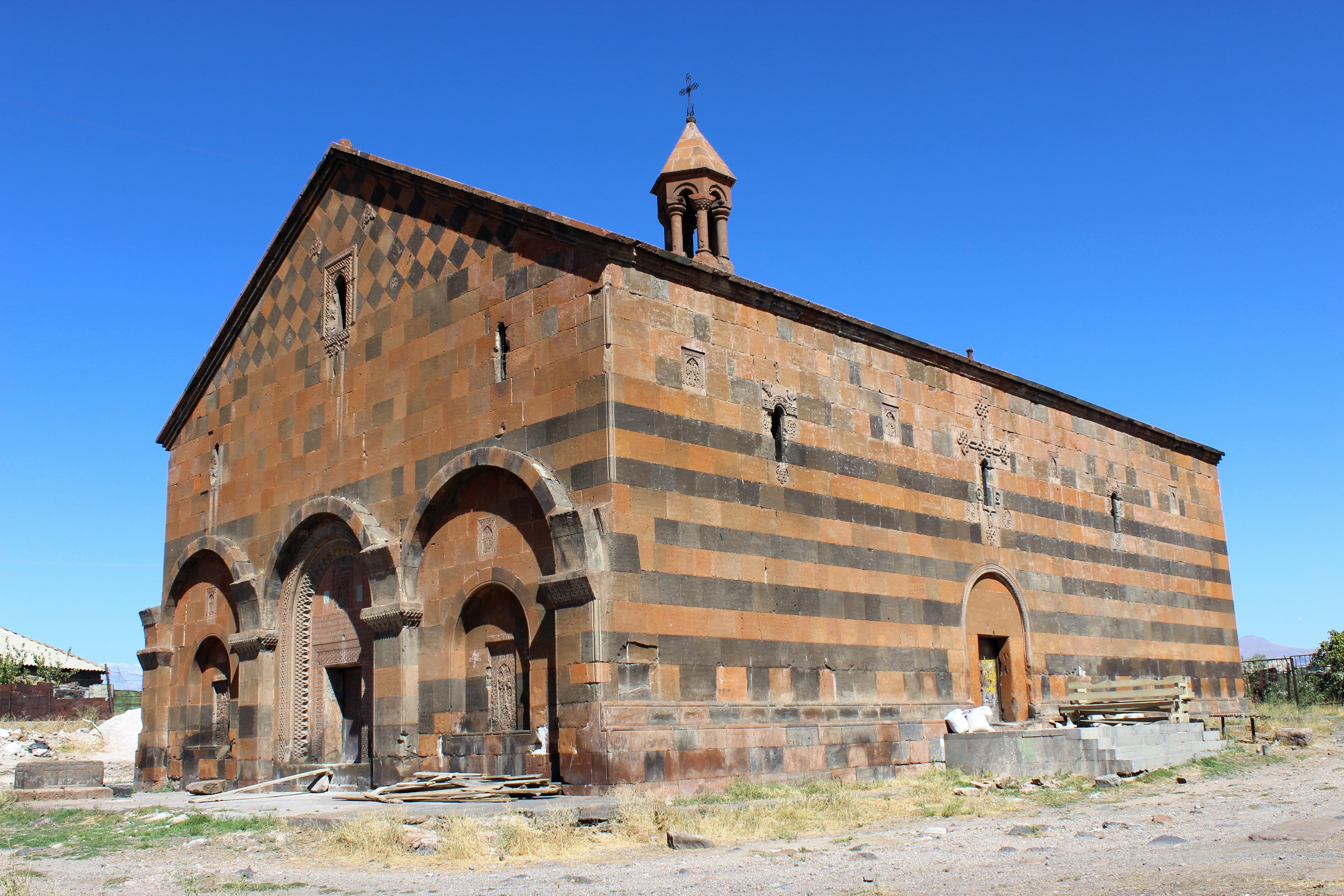
Holy Mother of God Church of Kanaker, Yerevan, 1695

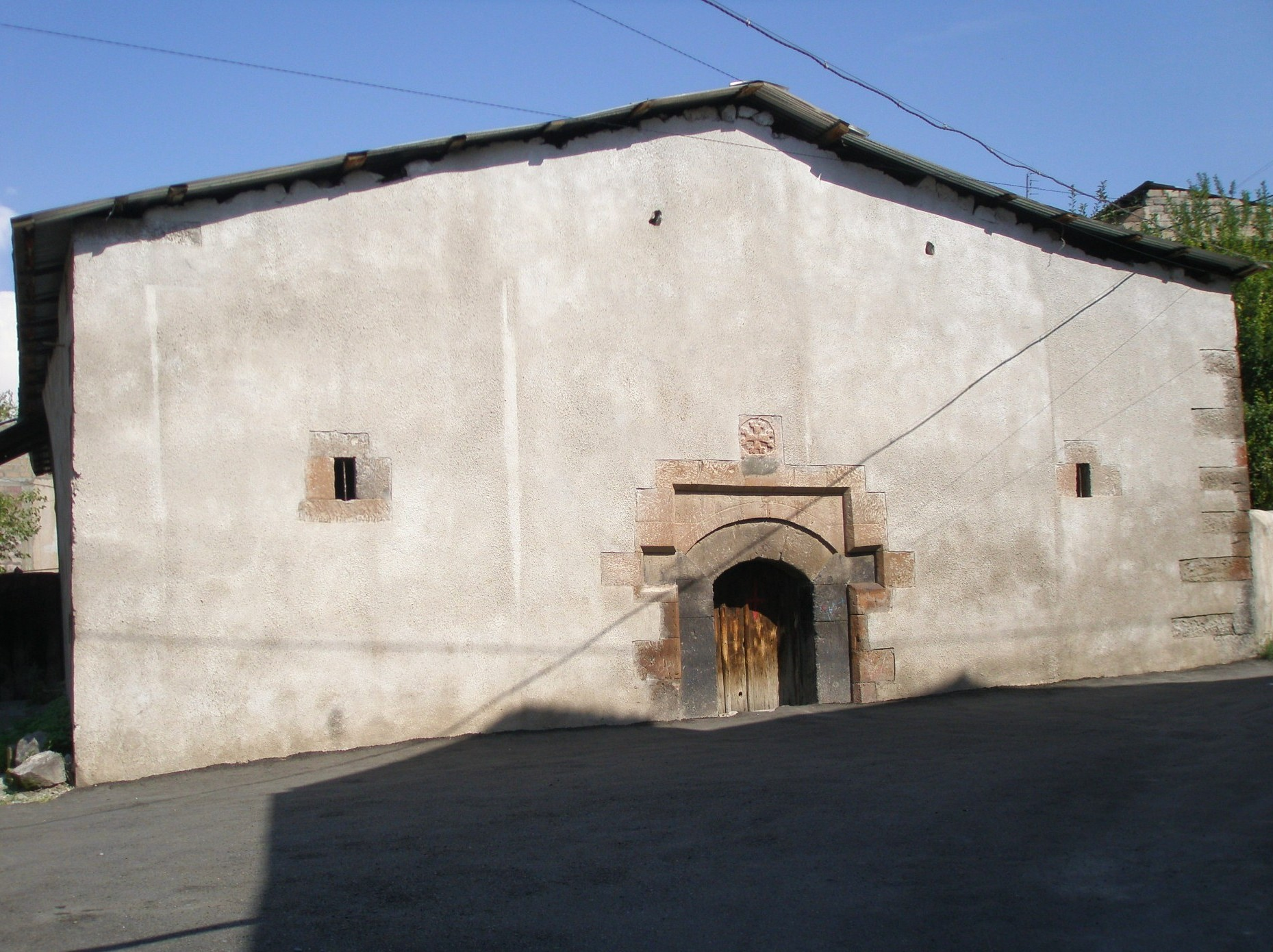
Holy Mother of God Parochial Church of Avan, Yerevan, 19th century
