= Ragimabad =

- Location within Armenia Location within Ararat
- Coordinates: 40°06′N 44°22′E
- Country: Armenia
- Marz (Province): Ararat
- Time zone: UTC+4 ( )
  - Summer (DST): UTC+5 ( )

Ragimabad is a town in the Ararat Province of Armenia.
