= Kerpikend =

- Location within Armenia Location within Ararat
- Coordinates: 40°04′23″N 44°49′53″E
- Country: Armenia
- Marz (Province): Ararat
- Time zone: UTC+4 ( )
  - Summer (DST): UTC+5 ( )

Kerpikend is a town in the Ararat Province of Armenia.

== See also ==
- Ararat Province
