= Ditak =

Ditak may refer to:

- Ditak, Armenia, a village in Armenia
- Triamterene, by trade name Ditak
