= Nor Kyank =

Nor Kyank or Nor Kyank’ or Nor Kyanq may refer to:

- Nor Kyank, Ararat, Armenia
- Nor Kyank, Shirak, Armenia
- Nor Kharberd, Armenia
