= Aygepat =

Aygepat Այգեպատ
- Location within Armenia Location within Ararat
- Coordinates: 39°57′00″N 44°36′00″E
- Country: Armenia
- Province: Ararat
- Municipality: Artashat

Population (2011)
  - Total: 1,287
- Time zone: UTC+4
  - Summer (DST): UTC+5

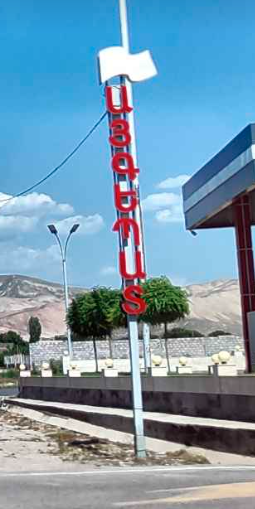
Aygepat village entrance

Aygepat (Armenian: Այգեպատ) is a village in the Artashat Municipality of the Ararat Province of Armenia.
