= Kakavaberd, Ararat =

Kakavaberd Կաքավաբերդ
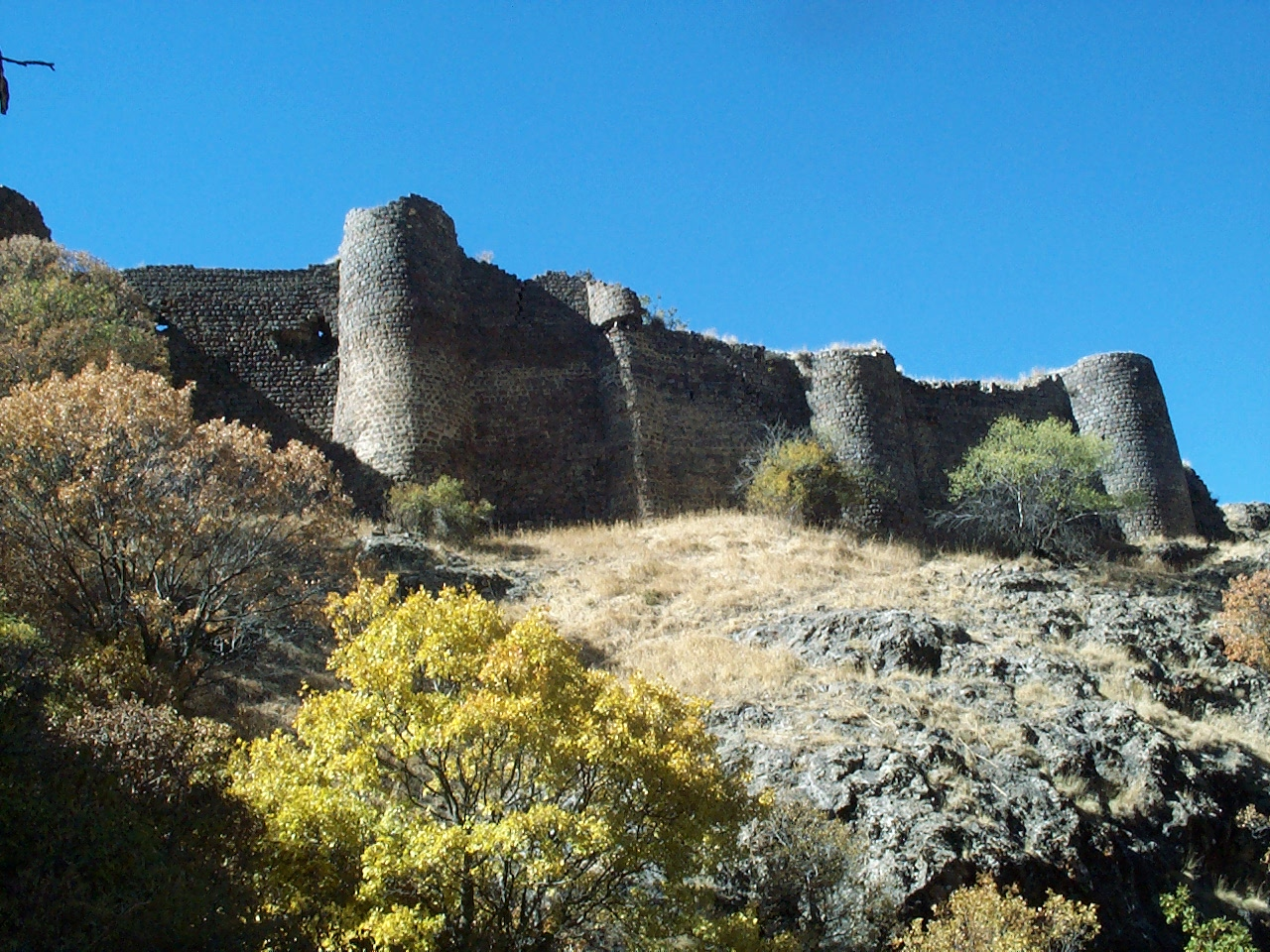

- Location within Armenia Location within Ararat
- Coordinates: 40°04′20″N 44°33′45″E
- Country: Armenia
- Province: Ararat
- Municipality: Artashat
- Elevation: 1,610 m (5,280 ft)

Population (2011)
  - Total: 0
- Time zone: UTC+4

Kakavaberd (Armenian: Կաքավաբերդ) is an abandoned village in the Artashat Municipality of the Ararat Province of Armenia.
