= Sardzhalar =

- Location within Armenia Location within Ararat
- Coordinates: 39°59′32″N 44°26′06″E
- Country: Armenia
- Province: Ararat

Sardzhalar, also Saracalar (Azerbaijani: Sarıcalar), is an abandoned village in the Ararat Province of Armenia.
