= Dashtavan =

Dashtavan Դաշտավան
- Location within Armenia Location within Ararat
- Coordinates: 40°06′06″N 44°23′26″E
- Country: Armenia
- Province: Ararat
- Municipality: Masis

Population (2011)
  - Total: 1,970
- Time zone: UTC+4
  - Summer (DST): UTC+5

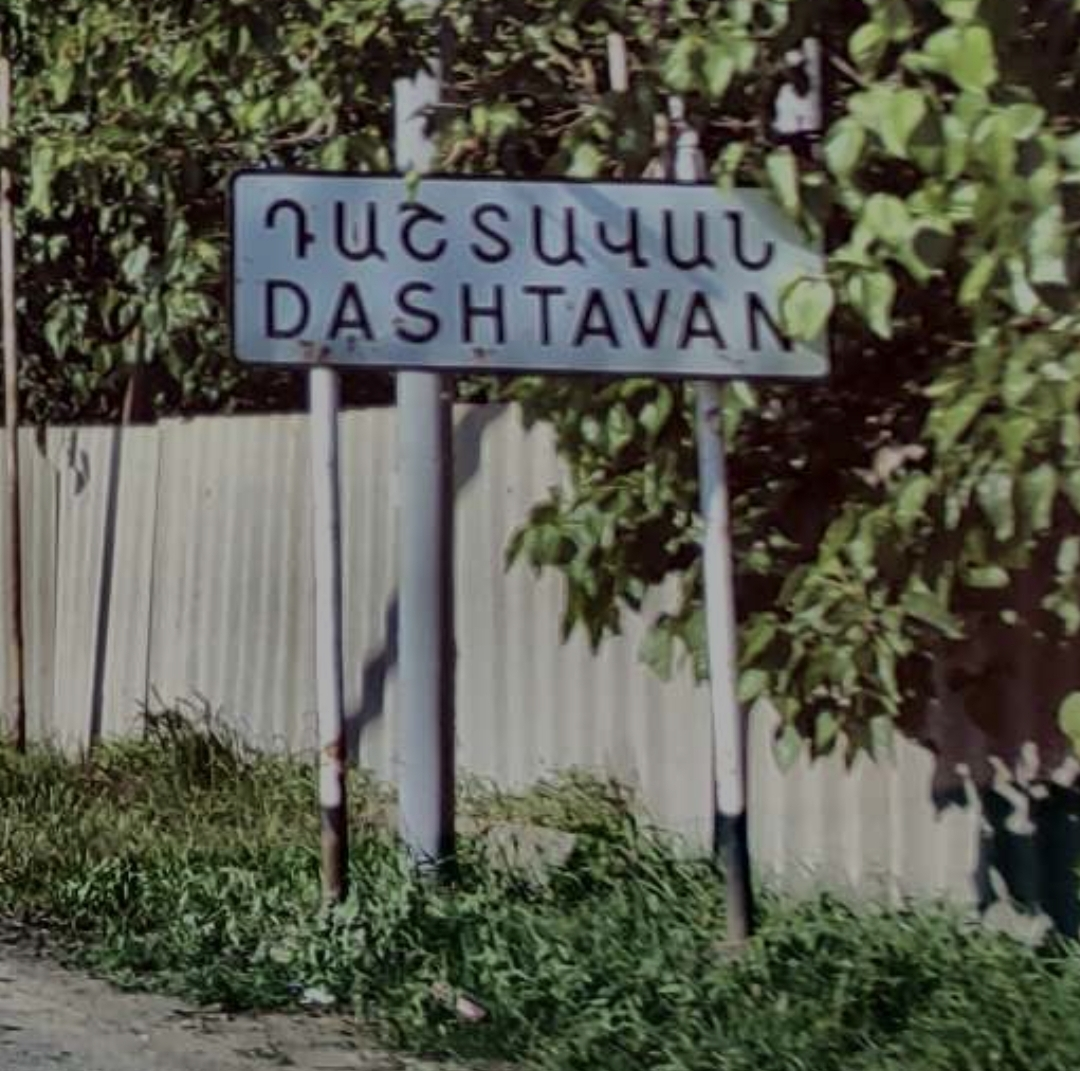
Village entrance

Dashtavan (Armenian: Դաշտավան) is a village in the Masis Municipality of the Ararat Province of Armenia.
