= Jrahovit =

Jrahovit Ջրահովիտ
- Location within Armenia Location within Ararat
- Coordinates: 40°02′43″N 44°28′25″E
- Country: Armenia
- Province: Ararat
- Municipality: Masis

Population (2011)
  - Total: 1,072
- Time zone: UTC+4
  - Summer (DST): UTC+5

Jrahovit (Armenian: Ջրահովիտ) is a village in the Masis Municipality of the Ararat Province of Armenia.
