= Vanashen =

Village in Ararat, Armenia

Vanashen Վանաշեն
- Location within Armenia Location within Ararat
- Coordinates: 39°54′N 44°41′E
- Country: Armenia
- Province: Ararat
- Municipality: Vedi

Population (2011)
  - Total: 2,364
- Time zone: UTC+4 (AMT)
  - Summer (DST): UTC+5 (DST)

Vanashen (Armenian: Վանաշեն) is a village in the Vedi Municipality of the Ararat Province of Armenia. Before 1978, it was known as Taytan.

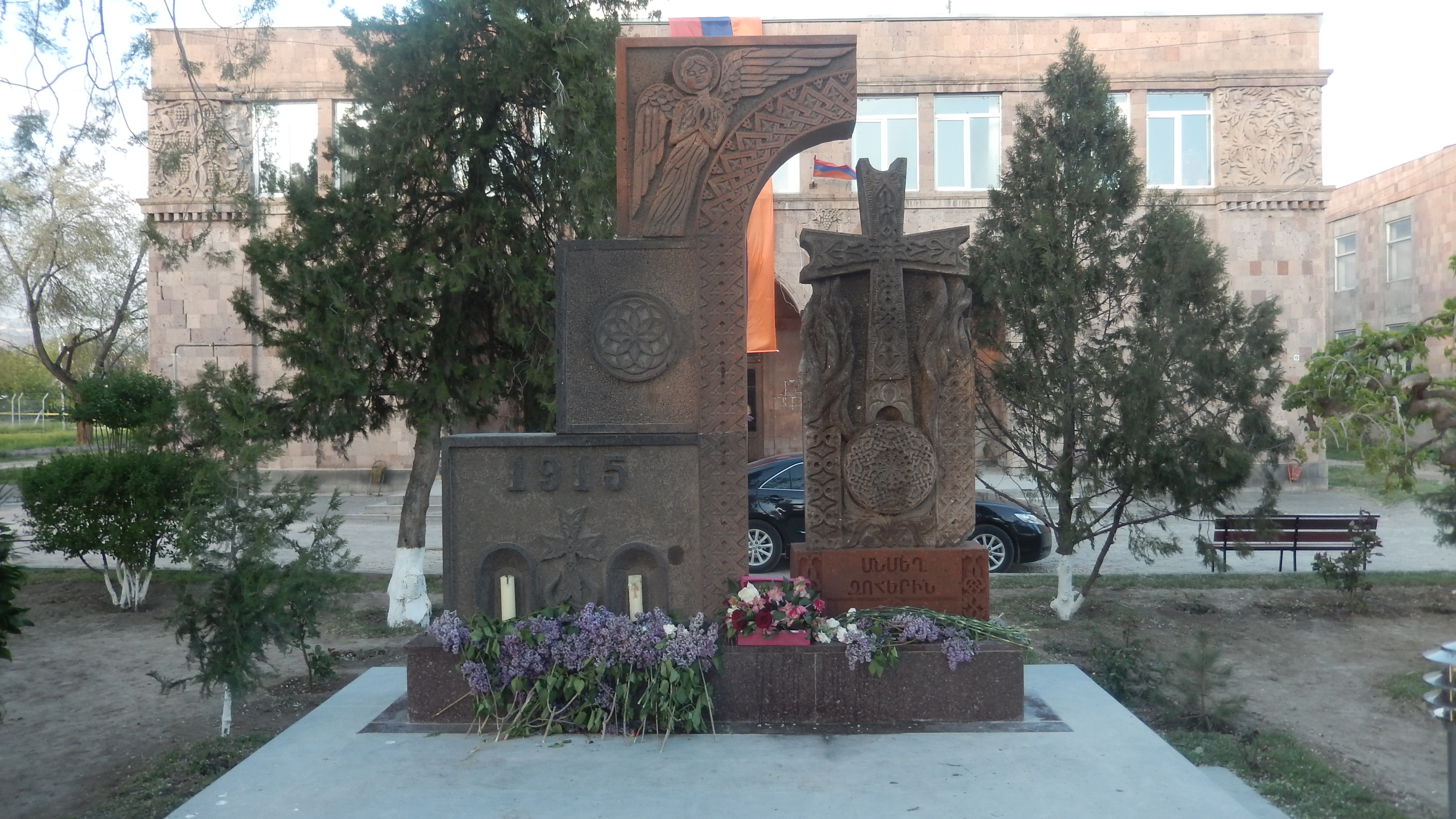
Armenian Genocide Memorial, Vanashen

It is one of the sites of the USAID Community Partnership for Health program.

== Notable people ==
- Eduard Halstyan, footballer of FC Chernihiv with 61 club caps

== See also ==
- Ararat Province
