= Bardzrashen, Ararat =

Village in Ararat, Armenia

Bardzrashen Բարձրաշեն
- Location within Armenia Location within Ararat
- Coordinates: 40°05′07″N 44°34′43″E
- Country: Armenia
- Province: Ararat
- Municipality: Artashat

Population (2011)
  - Total: 1,335
- Time zone: UTC+4
  - Summer (DST): UTC+5

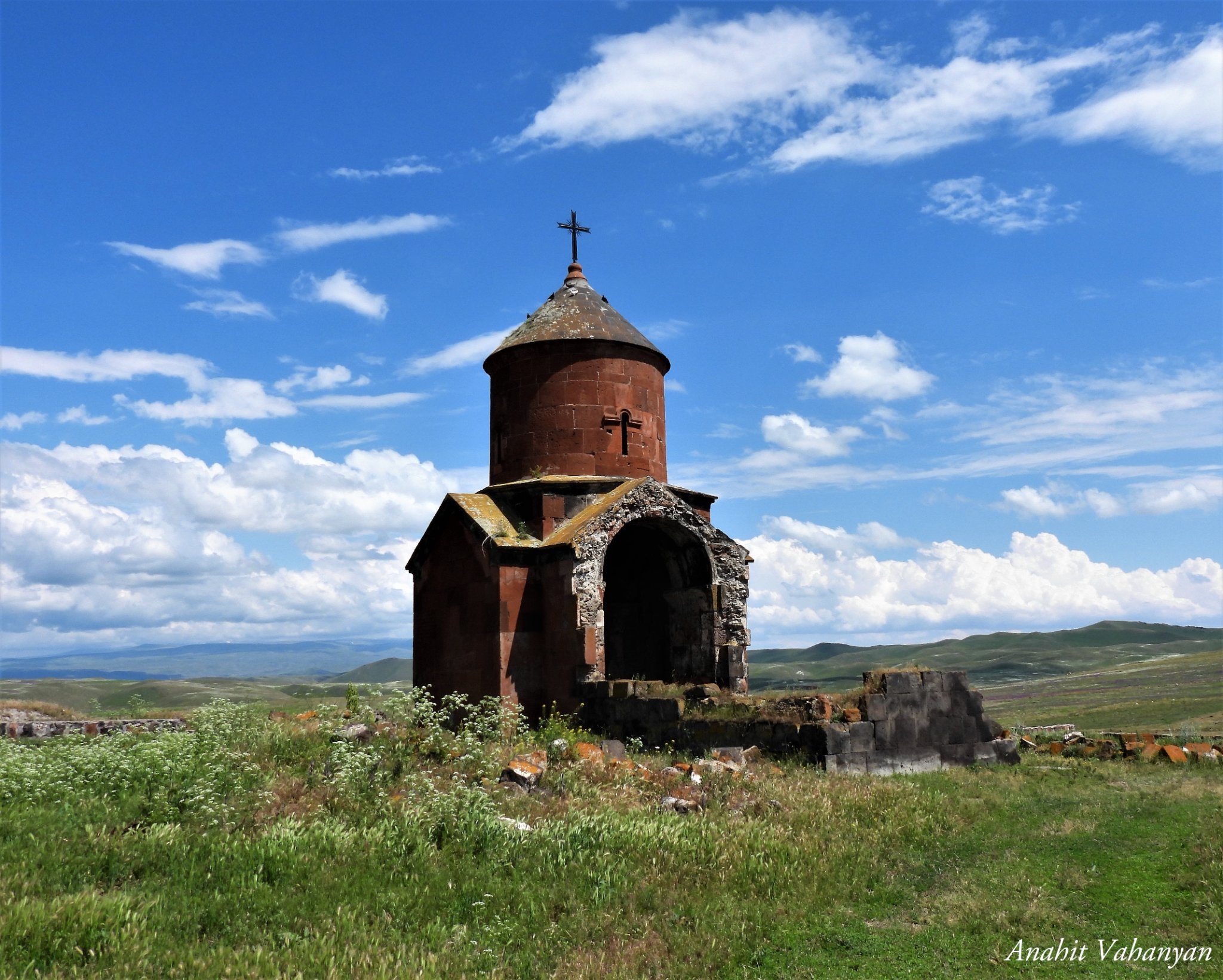
St. Astvatsatsin Church in Bardzrashen

Bardzrashen (Armenian: Բարձրաշեն) is a village in the Artashat Municipality of the Ararat Province of Armenia.
