= Deghdzut =

Deghdzut Դեղձուտ
- Location within Armenia Location within Ararat
- Coordinates: 40°01′35″N 44°32′56″E
- Country: Armenia
- Province: Ararat
- Municipality: Artashat

Population (2011)
  - Total: 1,027
- Time zone: UTC+4
  - Summer (DST): UTC+5

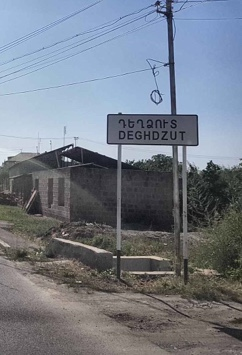
Entrance sign to Deghtsut

Deghdzut (Armenian: Դեղձուտ) is a village in the Artashat Municipality of the Ararat Province of Armenia.
