= Lanjanist =

Village in Ararat, Armenia

Lanjanist Լանջանիստ
- Location within Armenia Location within Ararat
- Coordinates: 39°52′N 44°57′E
- Country: Armenia
- Province: Ararat
- Municipality: Vedi
- Elevation: 1,815 m (5,955 ft)

Population (2011)
  - Total: 190
- Time zone: UTC+4
  - Summer (DST): UTC+5

Lanjanist (Armenian: Լանջանիստ) is a village in the Vedi Municipality of the Ararat Province of Armenia.

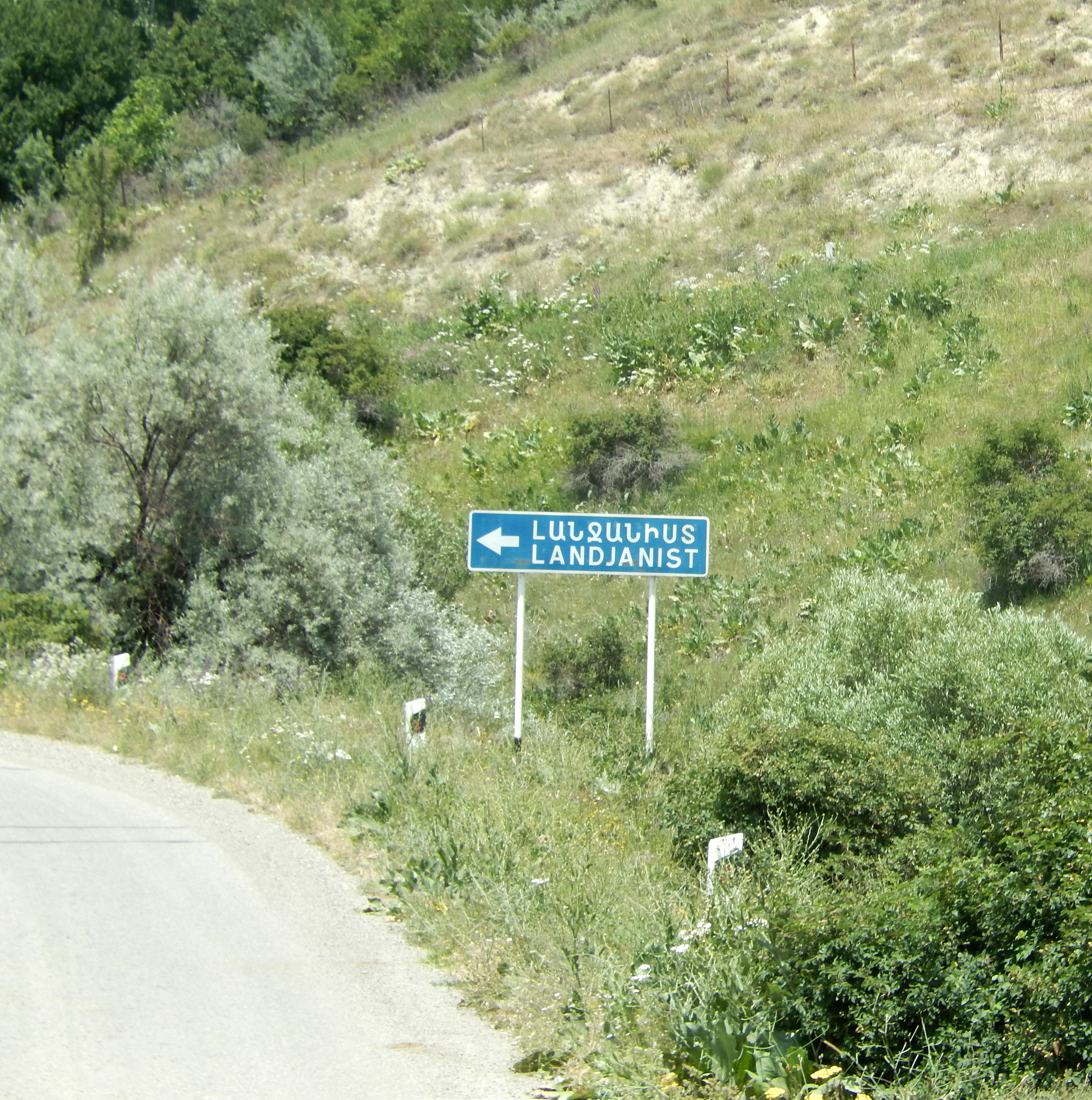

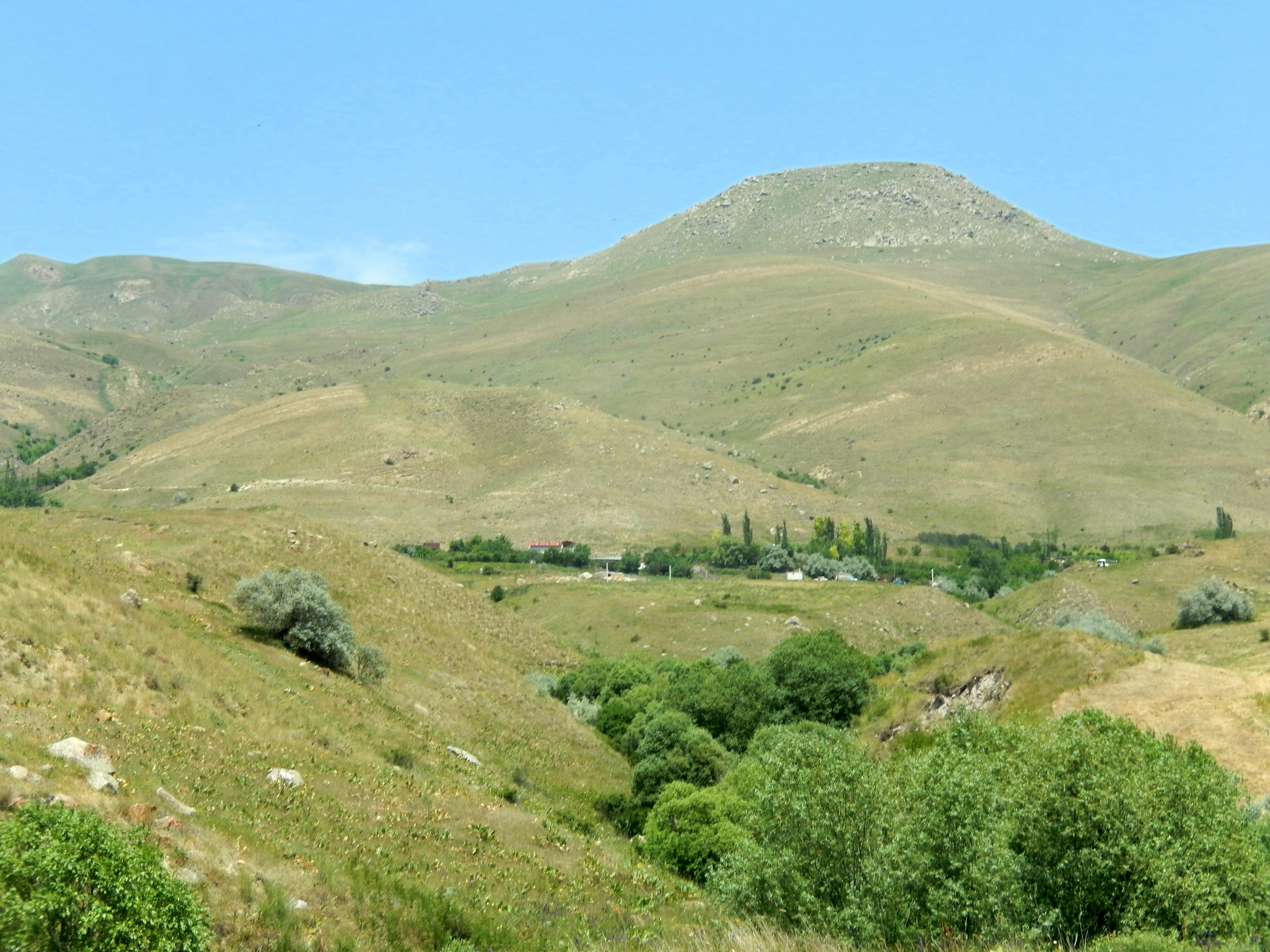
