= Sipanik =

Sipanik Սիփանիկ
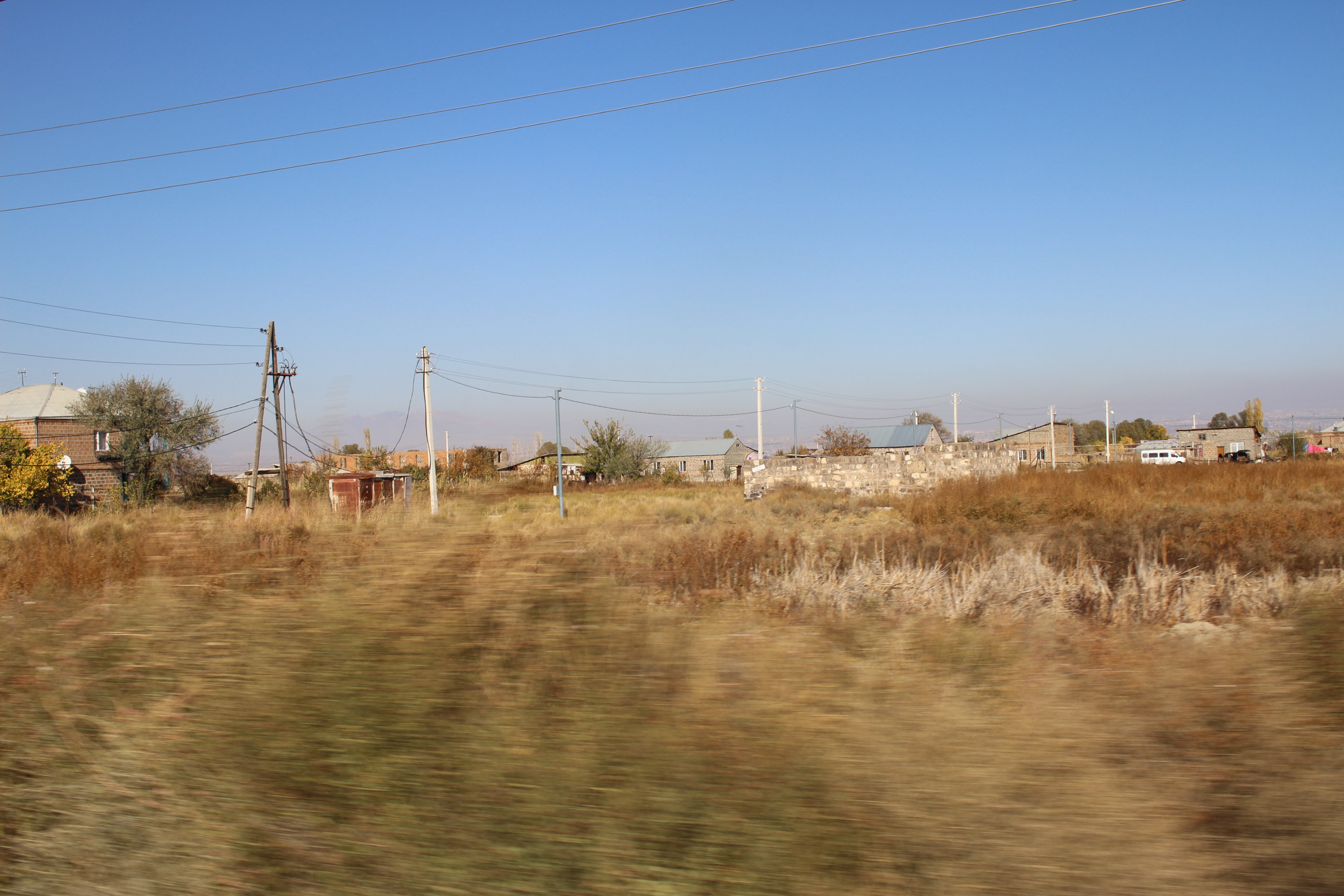
- Sipanik

- Location within Armenia Location within Ararat
- Coordinates: 40°06′25″N 44°21′08″E
- Country: Armenia
- Province: Ararat
- Municipality: Masis

Population (2011)
  - Total: 468
- Time zone: UTC+4
  - Summer (DST): UTC+5

Sipanik (Armenian: Սիփանիկ) is a village in the Masis Municipality of the Ararat Province of Armenia.
