= Dashtakar =

Village in Ararat, Armenia

Dashtakar Դաշտաքար
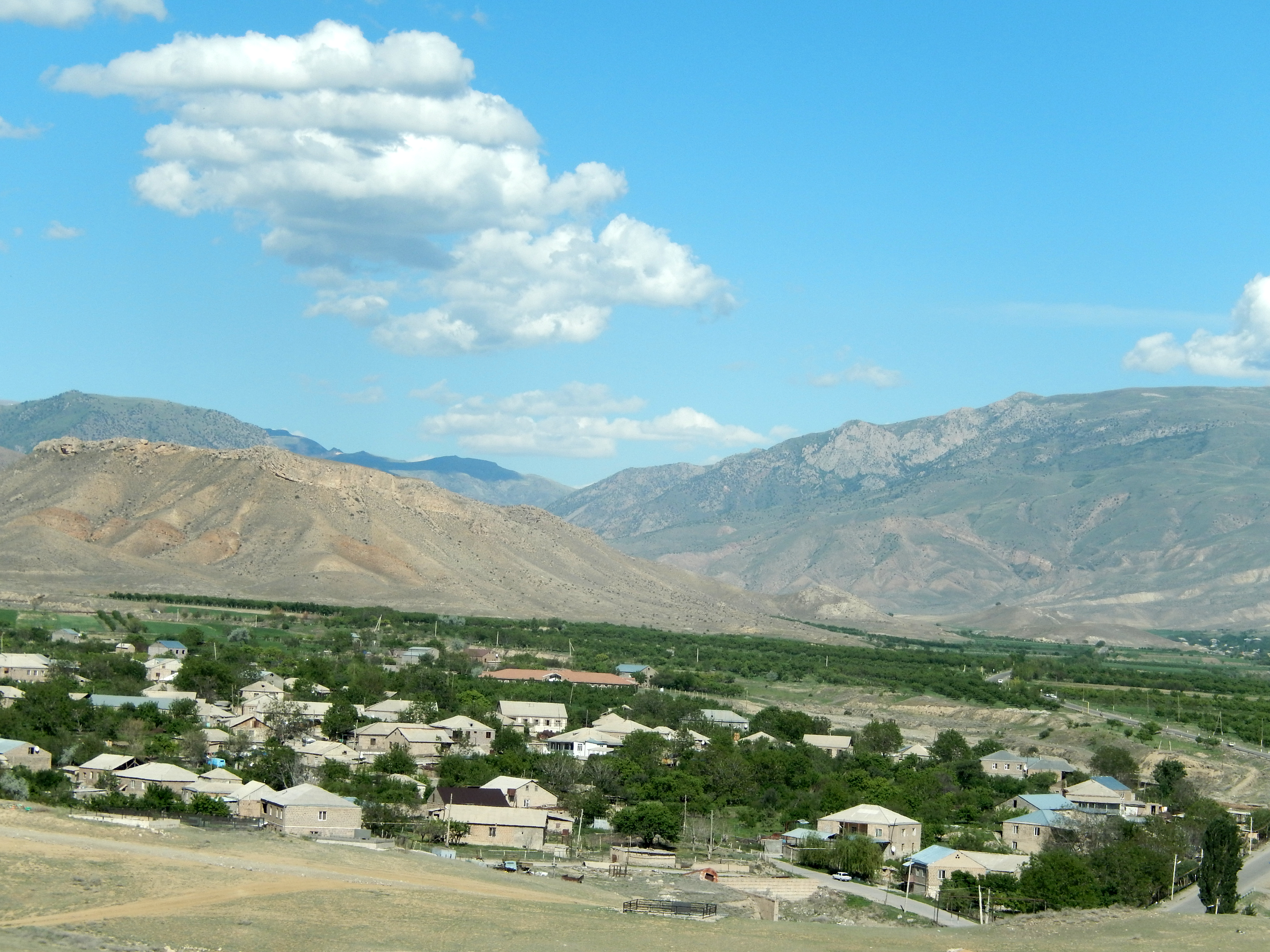
- Dashtakar

- Location within Armenia Location within Ararat
- Coordinates: 39°55′N 44°45′E
- Country: Armenia
- Province: Ararat
- Municipality: Vedi

Population (2011)
  - Total: 485
- Time zone: UTC+4
  - Summer (DST): UTC+5

Dashtakar (Armenian: Դաշտաքար) is a village in the Vedi Municipality of the Ararat Province of Armenia.
