= Arevabuyr =

Arevabuyr Արևաբույր
- Location within Armenia Location within Ararat
- Coordinates: 40°02′10″N 44°28′08″E
- Country: Armenia
- Province: Ararat
- Municipality: Masis

Population (2011)
  - Total: 1,026
- Time zone: UTC+4
  - Summer (DST): UTC+5

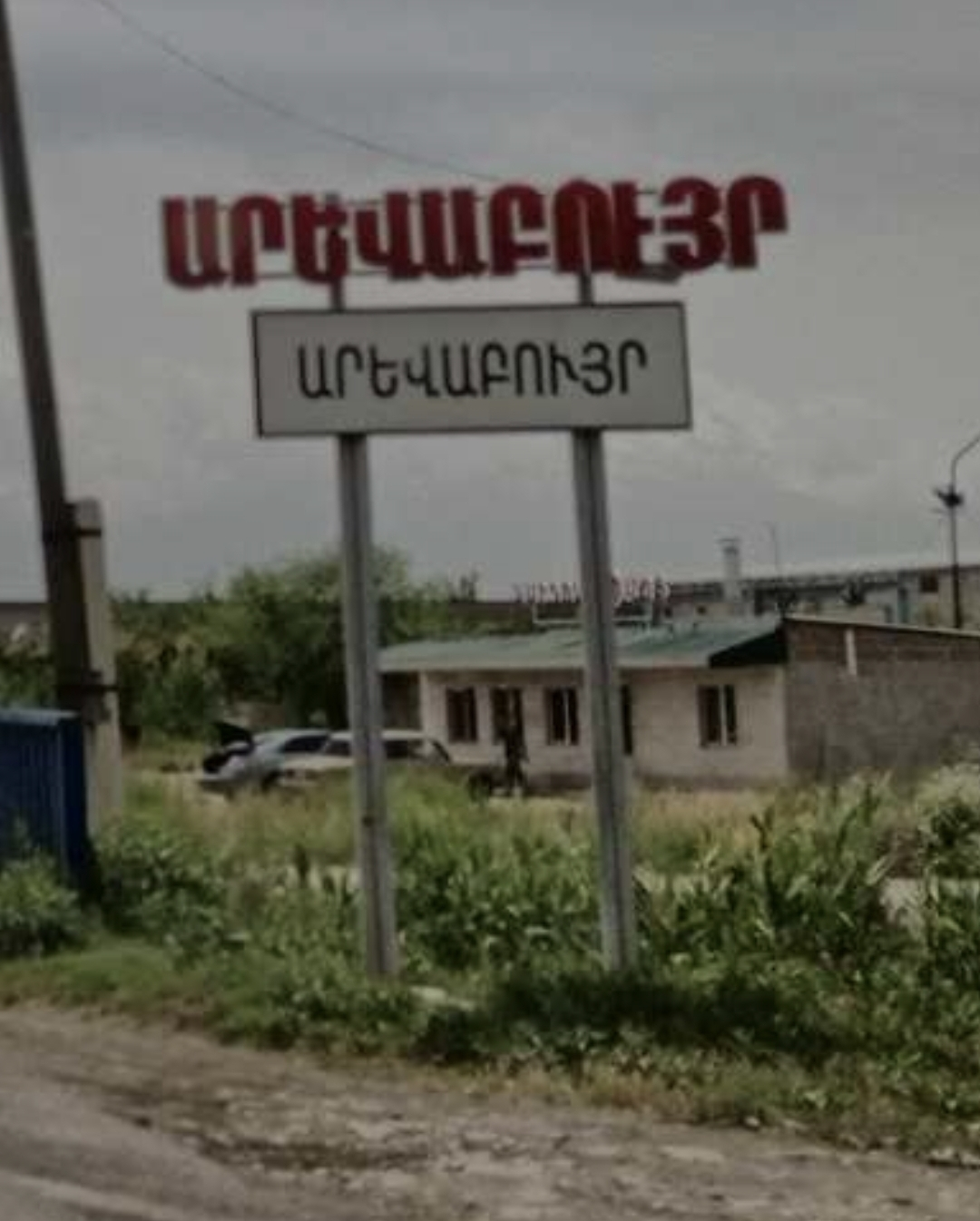
Village entrance

Arevabuyr (Armenian: Արևաբույր) is a village in the Masis Municipality of the Ararat Province of Armenia.

== See also ==
- Ararat Province
