= Kanachut =

Kanachut Կանաչուտ
- Location within Armenia Location within Ararat
- Coordinates: 40°00′32″N 44°32′40″E
- Country: Armenia
- Province: Ararat
- Municipality: Artashat

Population (2011)
  - Total: 1,028
- Time zone: UTC+4
  - Summer (DST): UTC+5

Kanachut (Armenian: Կանաչուտ) is a village in the Artashat Municipality of the Ararat Province of Armenia.
