= Vardashen, Ararat =

Village in Ararat, Armenia

Vardashen Վարդաշեն
- Location within Armenia Location within Ararat
- Coordinates: 40°02′01″N 44°33′21″E
- Country: Armenia
- Province: Ararat
- Municipality: Artashat

Population (2011)
  - Total: 473
- Time zone: UTC+4
  - Summer (DST): UTC+5

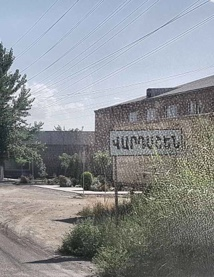

Vardashen (Armenian: Վարդաշեն) is a village in the Artashat Municipality of the Ararat Province of Armenia.
