= Nerkin Kamarlu =

- Location within Armenia Location within Ararat
- Coordinates: 39°57′N 44°33′E
- Country: Armenia
- Marz (Province): Ararat
- Time zone: UTC+4 ( )
  - Summer (DST): UTC+5 ( )

Nerkin Kamarlu (also, Nerk’in Kamarlu) is a town in the Ararat Province of Armenia.

== See also ==
- Ararat Province
