= Kaghtsrashen =

Village in Ararat, Armenia

Kaghtsrashen Քաղցրաշեն
- Location within Armenia Location within Ararat
- Coordinates: 39°58′N 44°37′E
- Country: Armenia
- Province: Ararat
- Municipality: Artashat

Population (2011)
  - Total: 2,794
- Time zone: UTC+4
  - Summer (DST): UTC+5

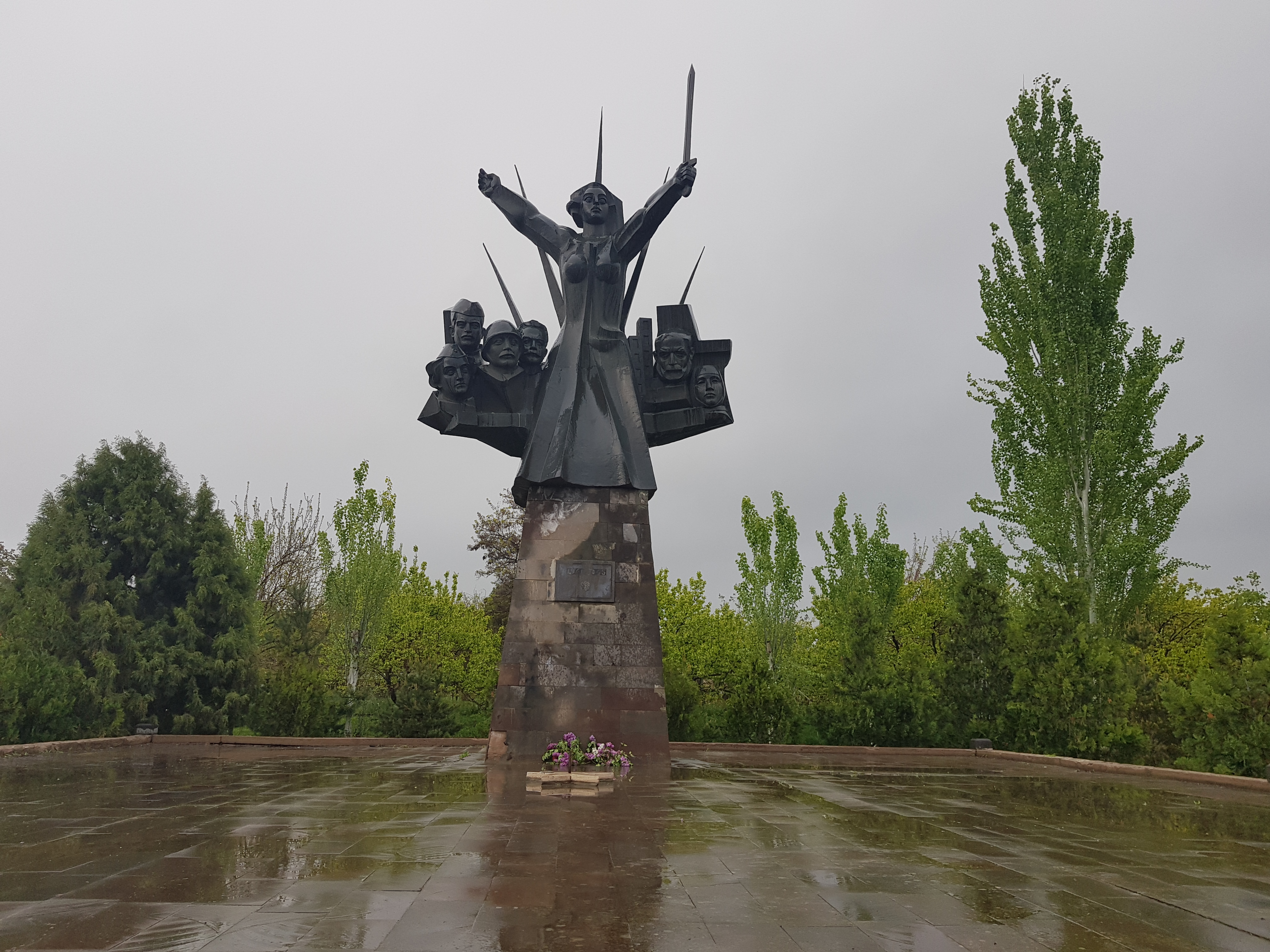
WW2 Memorial in Kaghtsrashen

Kaghtsrashen (Armenian: Քաղցրաշեն) is a village in the Artashat Municipality of the Ararat Province of Armenia.
