= Shorlu =

- Location within Armenia Location within Ararat
- Coordinates: 40°05′41″N 44°23′22″E
- Country: Armenia
- Marz (Province): Ararat
- Time zone: UTC+4 ( )
  - Summer (DST): UTC+5 ( )

Shorlu (also, Mets Shorlu Demurchi and Bol’shiye Demurchi) is a town in the Ararat Province of Armenia.

== See also ==
- Ararat Province
