= Urtsalanj =

Village in Ararat, Armenia

Urtsalanj Ուրցալանջ
- Location within Armenia Location within Ararat
- Coordinates: 39°51′11″N 44°59′06″E
- Country: Armenia
- Province: Ararat
- Municipality: Ararat

Population (2011)
  - Total: 157
- Time zone: UTC+4
  - Summer (DST): UTC+5

Urtsalanj (Armenian: Ուրցալանջ) is a village in the Ararat Municipality of the Ararat Province of Armenia.
