= Darbnik =

Village in Ararat, Armenia

Darbnik Դարբնիկ
- Location within Armenia Location within Ararat
- Coordinates: 40°06′25″N 44°22′35″E
- Country: Armenia
- Province: Ararat
- Municipality: Masis

Population (2011)
  - Total: 1,214
- Time zone: UTC+4
  - Summer (DST): UTC+5

Darbnik (Armenian: Դարբնիկ) is a village in the Masis Municipality of the Ararat Province of Armenia. In 1988-1989 Armenian refugees from Azerbaijan settled in the village.
