= Araksavan =

Village in Ararat, Armenia

Araksavan Արաքսավան
- Location within Armenia Location within Ararat
- Coordinates: 40°00′04″N 44°28′12″E
- Country: Armenia
- Province: Ararat
- Municipality: Artashat

Population (2011)
  - Total: 732
- Time zone: UTC+4
  - Summer (DST): UTC+5

Araksavan (Armenian: Արաքսավան) is a village in the Artashat Municipality of the Ararat Province of Armenia.
