= Nor Kyank, Ararat =

Village in Ararat, Armenia

Nor Kyank Նոր Կյանք
- Location within Armenia Location within Ararat
- Coordinates: 39°54′01″N 44°36′59″E
- Country: Armenia
- Province: Ararat
- Municipality: Vedi

Population (2011)
  - Total: 2,291
- Time zone: UTC+4
  - Summer (DST): UTC+5

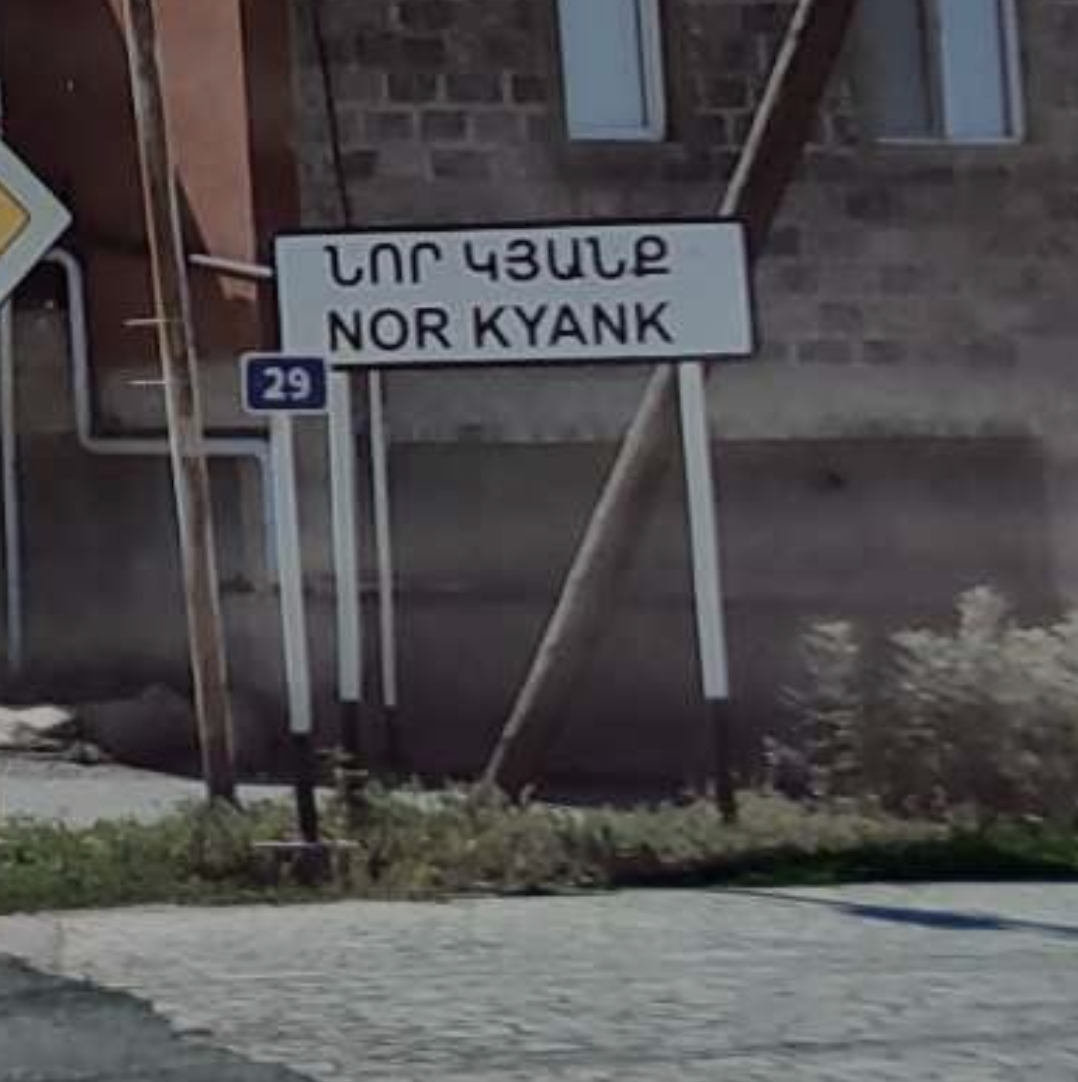
Village entrance

Nor Kyank (Armenian: Նոր Կյանք) is a village in the Vedi Municipality of the Ararat Province of Armenia.
