= Ditak, Armenia =

Ditak Դիտակ
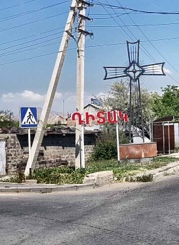
- Entrance of Ditak, Armenia

- Location within Armenia Location within Ararat
- Coordinates: 40°02′43″N 44°31′07″E
- Country: Armenia
- Province: Ararat
- Municipality: Artashat

Population (2011)
  - Total: 734
- Time zone: UTC+4
  - Summer (DST): UTC+5

Ditak (Armenian: Դիտակ) is a village in the Artashat Municipality of the Ararat Province of Armenia.
