= Ararat Province =

Province of Armenia

Ararat Արարատ
- Province
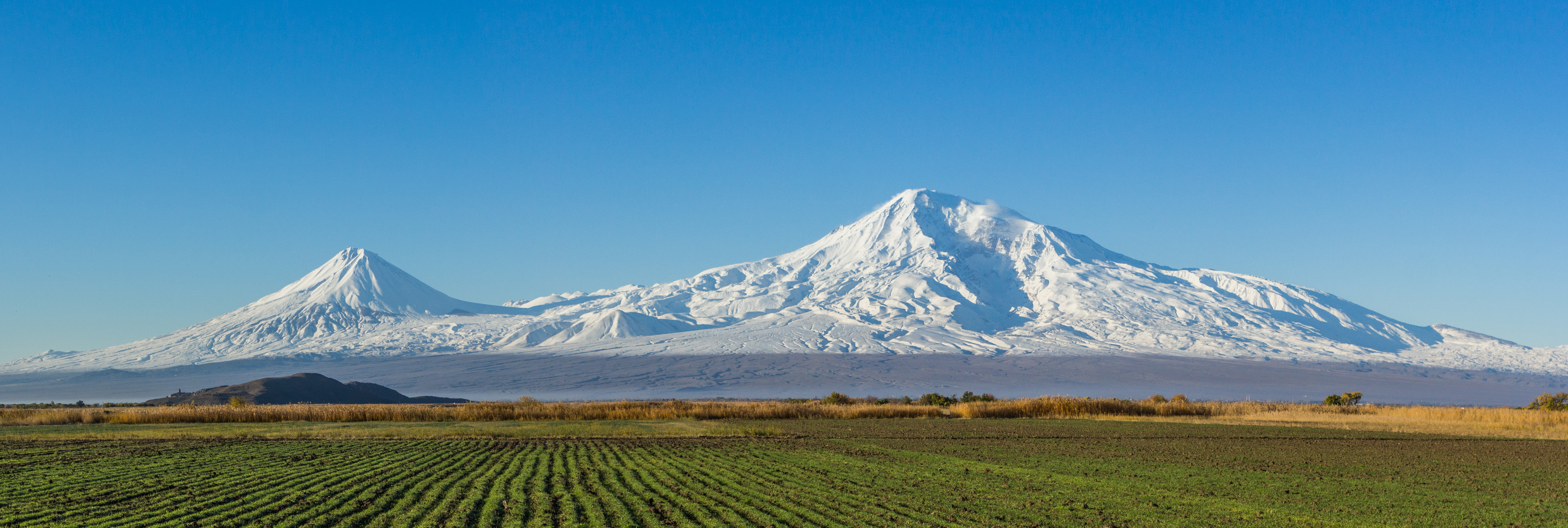
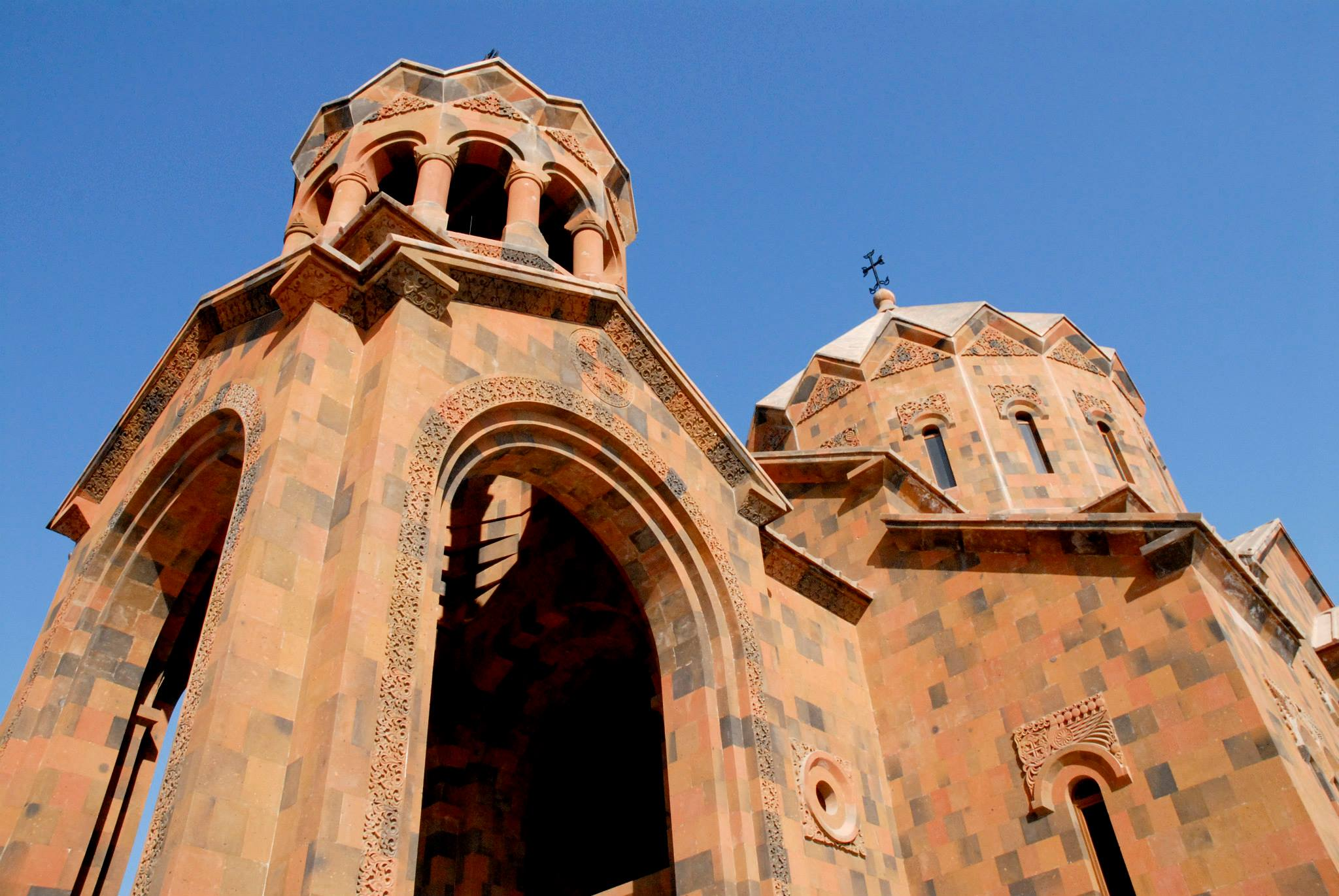
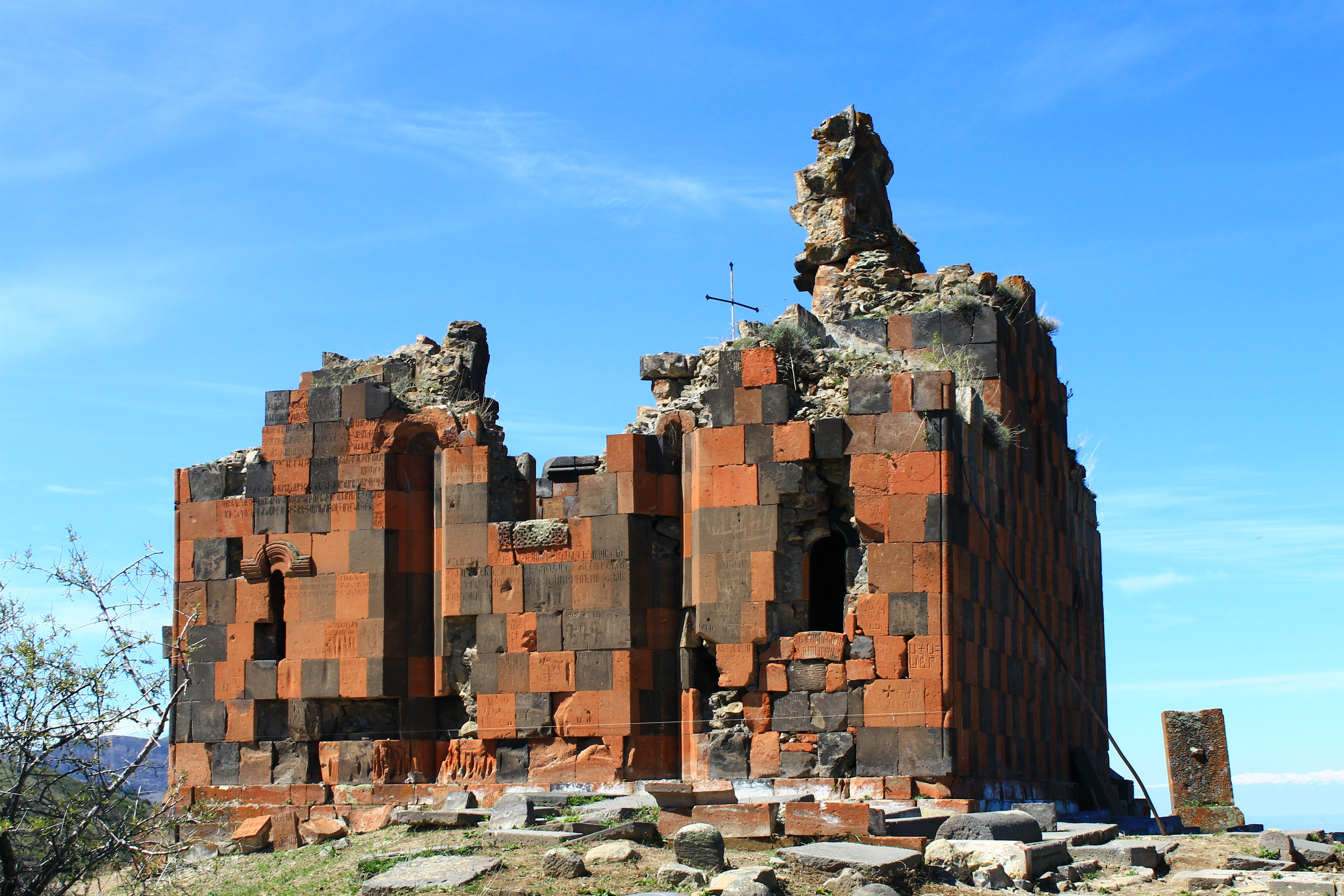
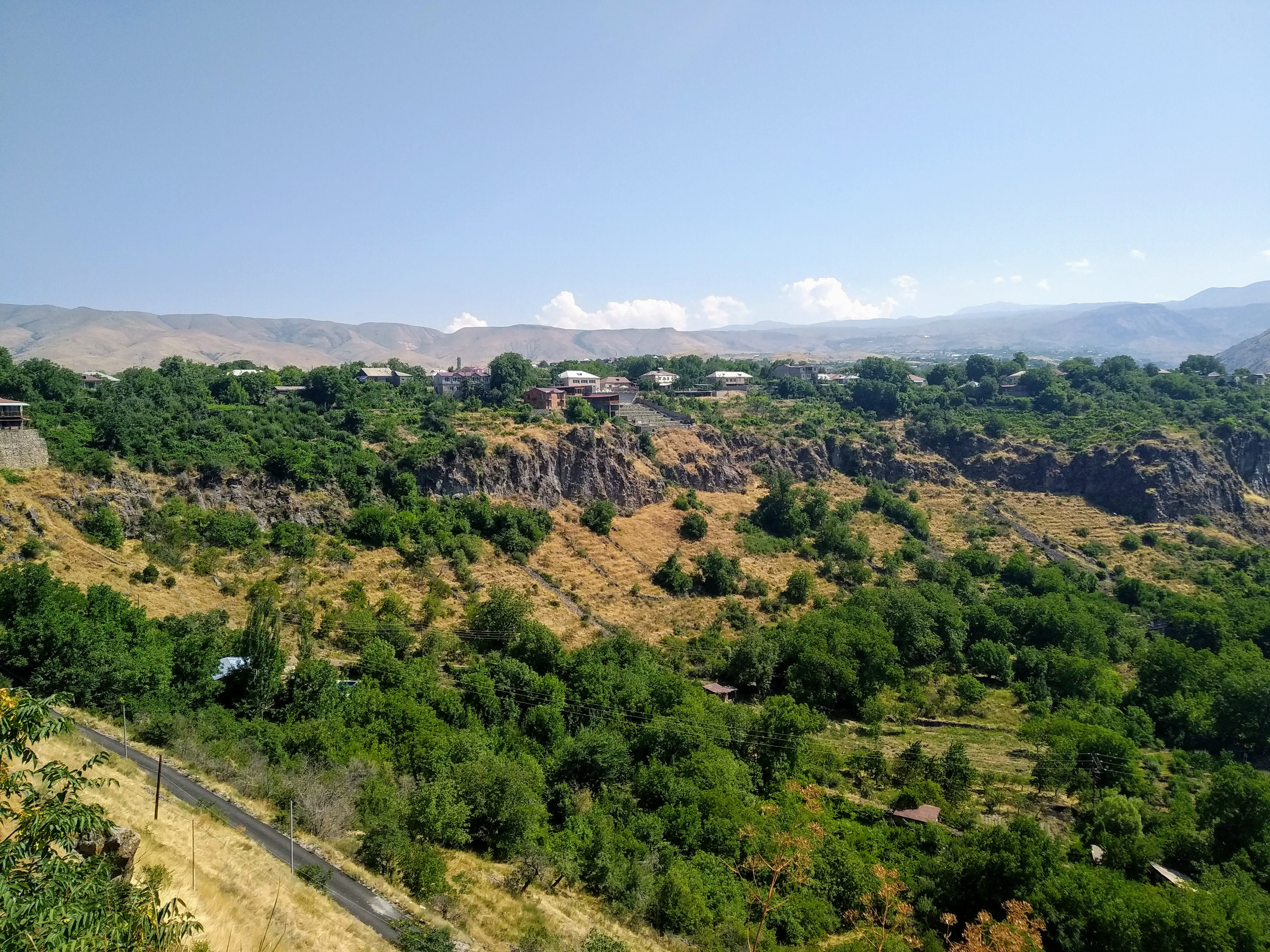
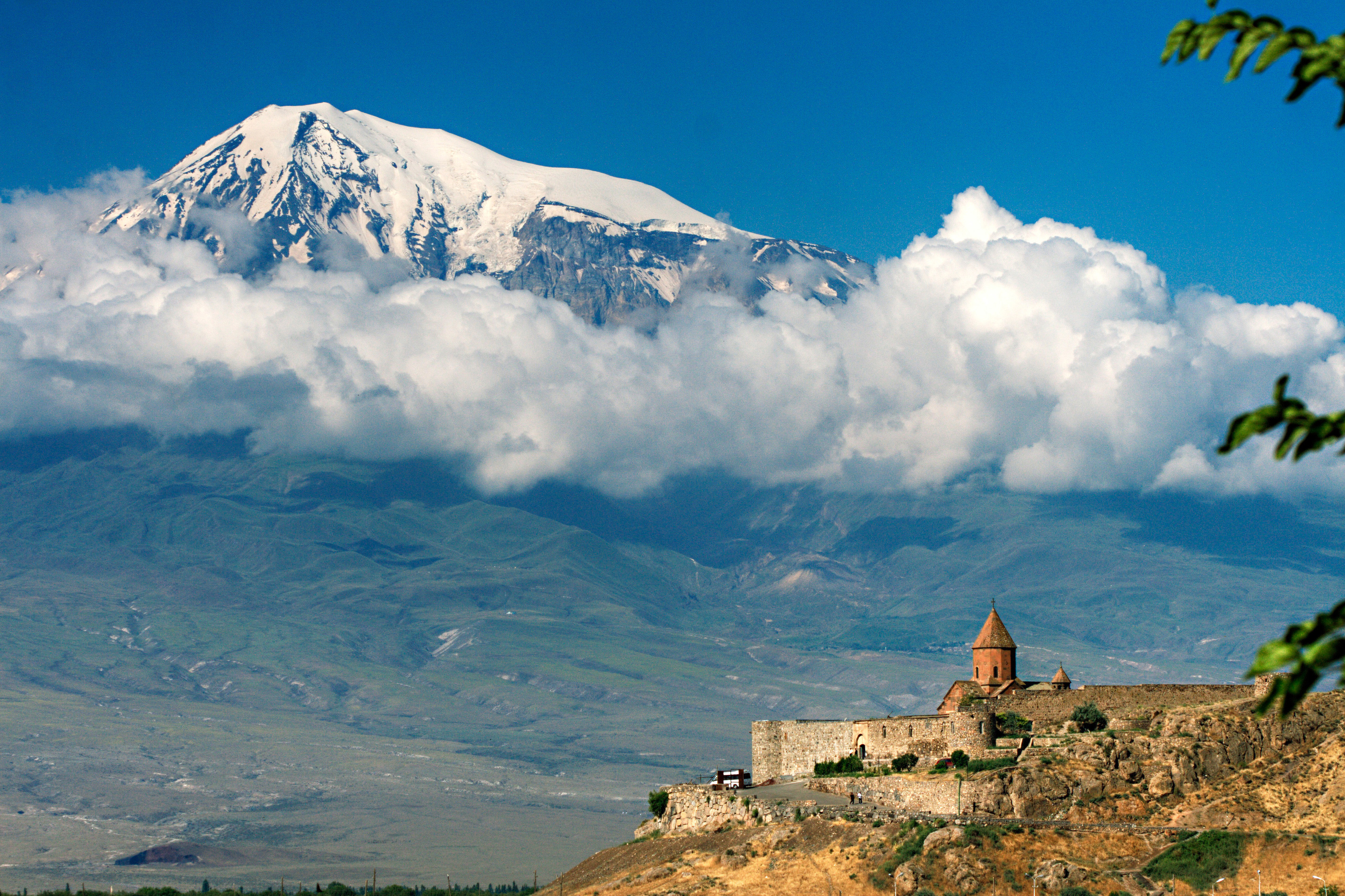
- From the top, View of Mount Ararat from the Ararat Plain, Surp Hovhannes Church in Artashat, Havuts Tar, Khosrov Forest, Khor Virap

- Location of Ararat within Armenia
- Coordinates: 39°55′N 44°43′E
- Country: Armenia
- Capital Largest city: Artashat; Masis

Government
  - Governor: Sedrak Tevonyan

Area
  - Total: 2,090 km^{2} (810 sq mi)
  - Rank: 8th

Population (2022)
  - Total: 248,982
  - Rank: 4th
  - Density: 119/km^{2} (309/sq mi)

GDP
  - Total: ֏ 381.659 billion (US$ 791 million)
  - Per capita: ֏ 1,478,727 (US$ 3,065)
- Time zone: AMT (UTC+04)
- Postal code: 0601-0823
- ISO 3166 code: AM.AR
- FIPS 10-4: AM02
- HDI (2022): 0.764 high · 9th
- Website: Official website

Ararat (Armenian: Արարատ, Armenian pronunciation: [ɑɾɑˈɾɑt]) is a province (marz) of Armenia. Its capital and largest city is the town of Artashat.

The province is named after the biblical Mount Ararat. It is bordered by Turkey from the west and Azerbaijan's Nakhchivan Autonomous Republic from the south. It surrounds the Karki exclave of Nakhichevan which has been controlled by Armenia since its capture in May 1992 during the First Nagorno-Karabakh War. Domestically, Ararat is bordered by Armavir Province from the northwest, Kotayk Province from the north, Gegharkunik Province from the east, Vayots Dzor Province from the southeast and the city of Yerevan from the north.

Two former capitals of Armenia are located in the modern-day Ararat Province, Artaxata and Dvin. It is also home to the Khor Virap monastery, significant as the place of Gregory the Illuminator's 13-year imprisonment and the closest point to Mount Ararat within Armenian borders.

== Etymology ==
Ararat Province is named after the historic Ayrarat province of Ancient Armenia.

According to Movses Khorenatsi and the Ashkharatsuyts medieval Armenian geographical book of Anania Shirakatsi, Ayrarat was one of the 15 provinces of Armenia Major. It was considered the central province of the Armenian Highland.

It is believed that the name Ararat is the Armenian equivalent of the toponym Urartu.

== Geography ==
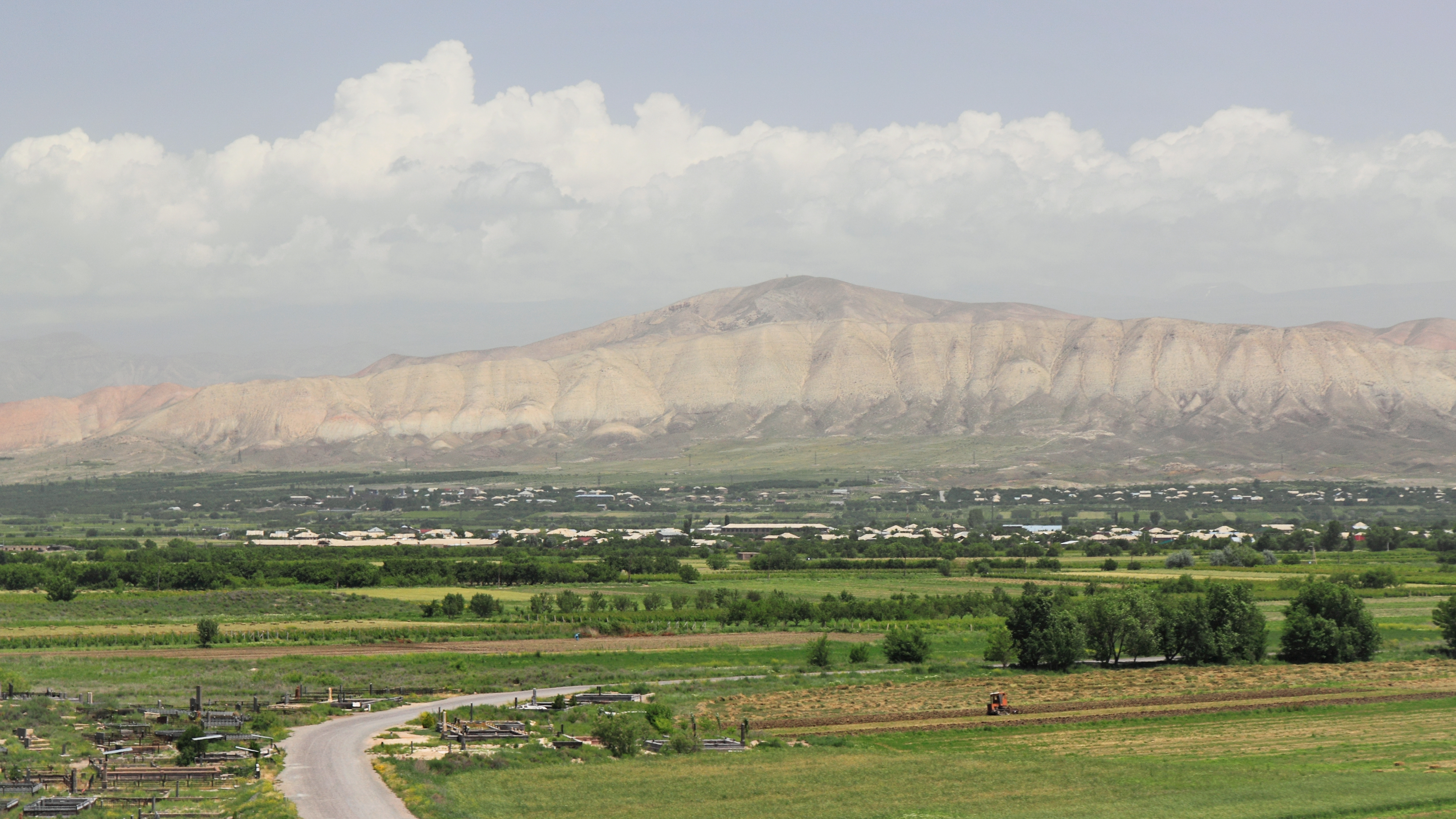
Yerakh mountains at the central part of the province

Ararat has an area of 2,090 km^{2} (7% of total area of Armenia). It occupies the east of the central part of modern-day Armenia. From the north, it has borders with Armavir Province, Yerevan and Kotayk Province. From the east, its bordered by Gegharkunik and Vayots Dzor. Iğdır Province of Turkey and Azerbaijan's Nakhchivan Autonomous Republic respectively form the western and southern borders of the province.

Historically, the current territory of the province mainly occupies the Vostan Hayots canton of Ayrarat province of Ancient Armenia.

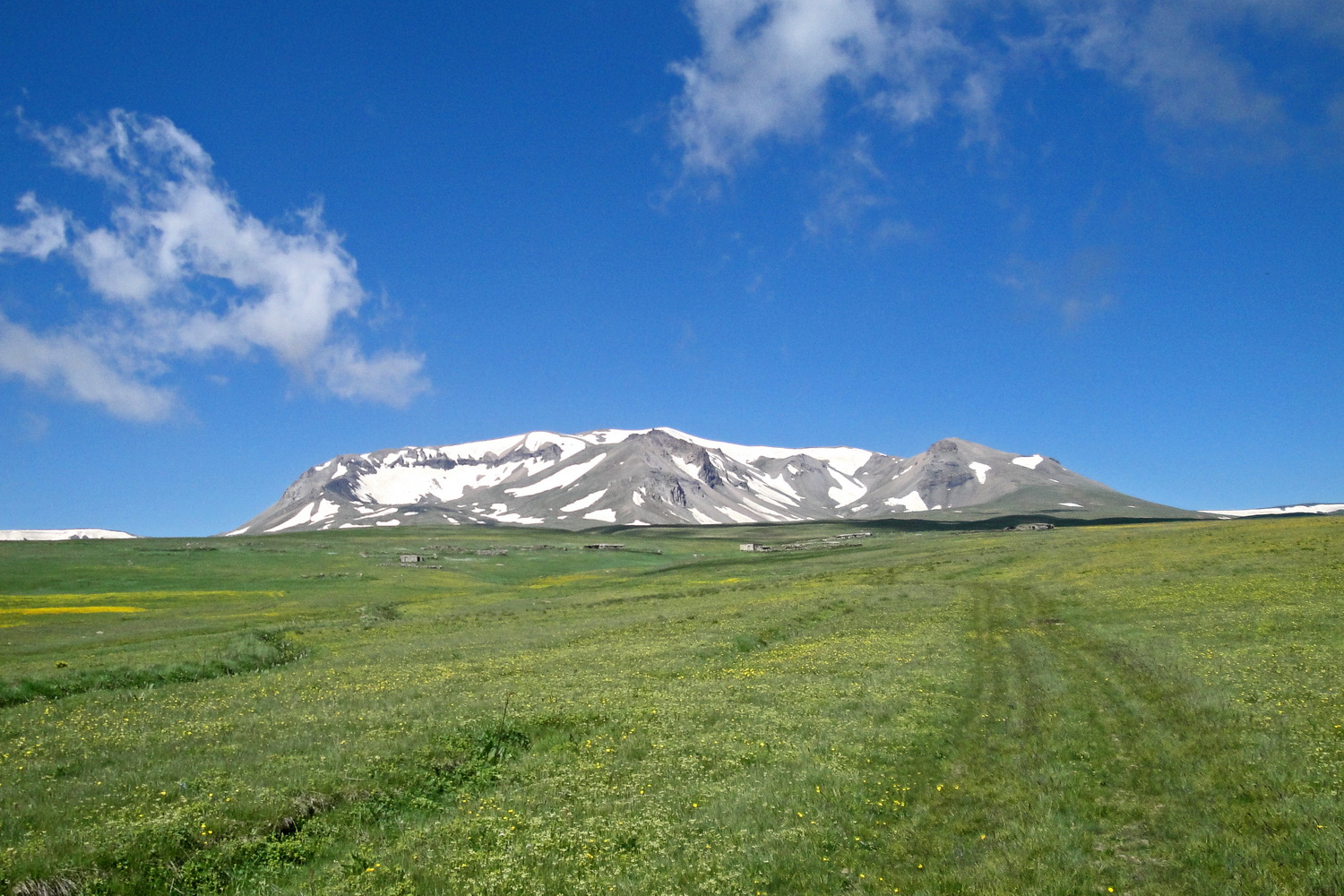
Spitakasar mountain (3560 m.)

The province is located at the southeast of the Ararat plain, surrounded by the Yeranos mountains from the north, the mountains of Gegham, Dahnak and Mzhkatar from the east, Urts mountains from the south and the Araks river from the west. The mountains of Yerakh are located at the centre of the province. Approximately, 30% of the territory is plain, while the rest is dominated by mountains.

The highest point of Ararat province is the Spitakasar peak of Gegham mountains with a height of 3560 meters. The lowest point is 801 meters at the Araks valley. Araks, Hrazdan, Azat and Vedi, are the 4 major rivers the flow through the province. The climate within the territory of the province is highly diversified. It ranges between extremely arid climate at the lower plains and cold snowy climate at the heights.

The cliffy terrain of Khosrov Forest located at the northeast of the province, used to be the stronghold of the Endangered Caucasian leopards in Armenia. Between October 2000 to July 2002 tracks of no more than 10 individuals were found in an area of 780 km^{2} (300 sq mi).

== History ==
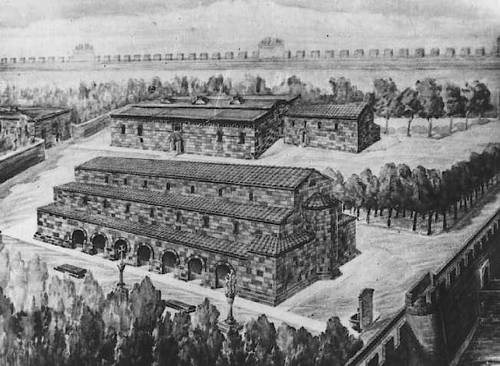
Drawing of the central square of the ancient Armenian capital city of Dvin. The main cathedral of St. Grigor (3rd-5th century), with a small church of St. Sarkis to the right (6th century), and the residence of the Catholicos on the left (5th century)

The region of modern-day Ararat Province is among the earliest locations that was settled by the people of the Armenian Highland. It mainly includes the 3 cantons of Vostan Hayots, Urstadzor and Arats of the historic Ayrarat province. Vostan Hayots was known since the establishment of the Artaxiad Kingdom of Armenia at the beginning of the 2nd century BC. The ancient Armenian capitals of Artaxata founded in 176 BC, and Dvin founded during the 4th century AD, were both located within the Vostan Hayots canton. The other cantons of Urtsadzor and Arats were first mentioned in the 5th century AD by Yeghishe the historian in his "History of Vardan and the Armenian War" historical work.

After the fall of the Armenian Kingdom in 428, the region became part of the Sasanian Empire of Persia until the Arab conquest of Armenia in the mid-7th century. According to the 8th-century historian Ghevond, the Armenian princes of Urtsadzor canton participated in the failed revolution of 775 in Erciş against the Abbasid rulers of Arminiya.

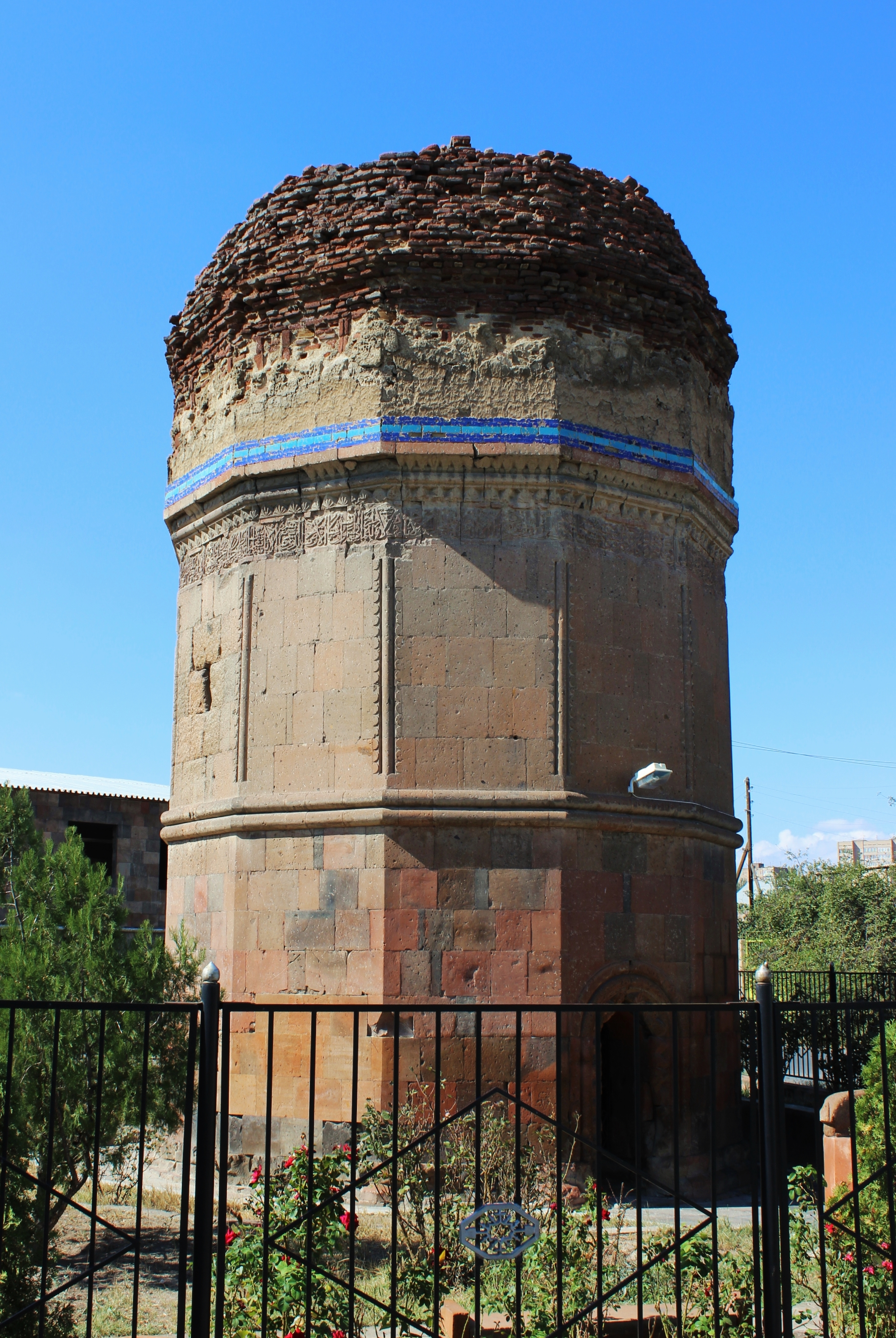
The Mausoleum of Kara Koyunlu emirs in Argavand, 1413

At the end of the 9th century, the 3 cantons became part of the newly established Bagratid Kingdom of Armenia. However, between the 11th and 15th centuries, the region suffered from the Seljuk, Mongol, Ag Qoyunlu and Kara Koyunlu invasions, respectively. At the beginning of the 16th century, the territory of modern-day Ararat became part of the Erivan Beglarbegi within the Safavid Persia. During the first half of the 18th century, the territory became part of the Erivan Khanate under the rule of the Afsharid dynasty and later under the Qajar dynasty of Persia. It remained under the Persian rule until 1827–1828, when Eastern Armenia was ceded by the Russian Empire as a result of the Russo-Persian War of 1826–28 and the signing of the Treaty of Turkmenchay.

With the fall of the Russian Empire and as a result of the decisive Armenian victories over the Turks in the battles of Sardarabad, Abaran, and Gharakilisa, the region became part of the independent Armenia in May 1918, however, its western reaches remained occupied by the Ottoman Empire (by virtue of the Treaty of Batum) until the latter's withdrawal in late 1918. In July 1919, lasting until mid-1920, the Azerbaijanis-inhabited regions of Ararat, Vedibasar and Zangibasar, revolted against the Armenian government as part of the Muslim uprisings in Kars and Sharur–Nakhichevan.

After 2 years of brief independence, Armenia became part of the Soviet Union in December 1920. From 1930 until 1995, modern-day Ararat was divided into 3 raions within the Armenian SSR: Masis raion, Artashat raion, and Ararat raion (known as Vedi raion until 1968)—there was also the Gharabaghlar raion which was formed in 1937 but later dissolved and attached to the Vedi raion in 1951, its administrative center was the town Urtsadzor. With the territorial administration reform of 1995, the 3 raions were consolidated into the Ararat Province.

== Demographics ==
=== Population ===
According to the 1989 Soviet census, the Ararat Province (then part of the Ararat, Artashat, and Masis districts in 1930–1995) had a population of 266,527. 52,429 or 19.67% of which was urban, distributed in the cities of Ararat (20,105) and Artashat (32,324), and 214,098 or 80.33% were rural, distributed in the districts of Ararat (64,657), Artashat (73,269), and Masis (76,172).

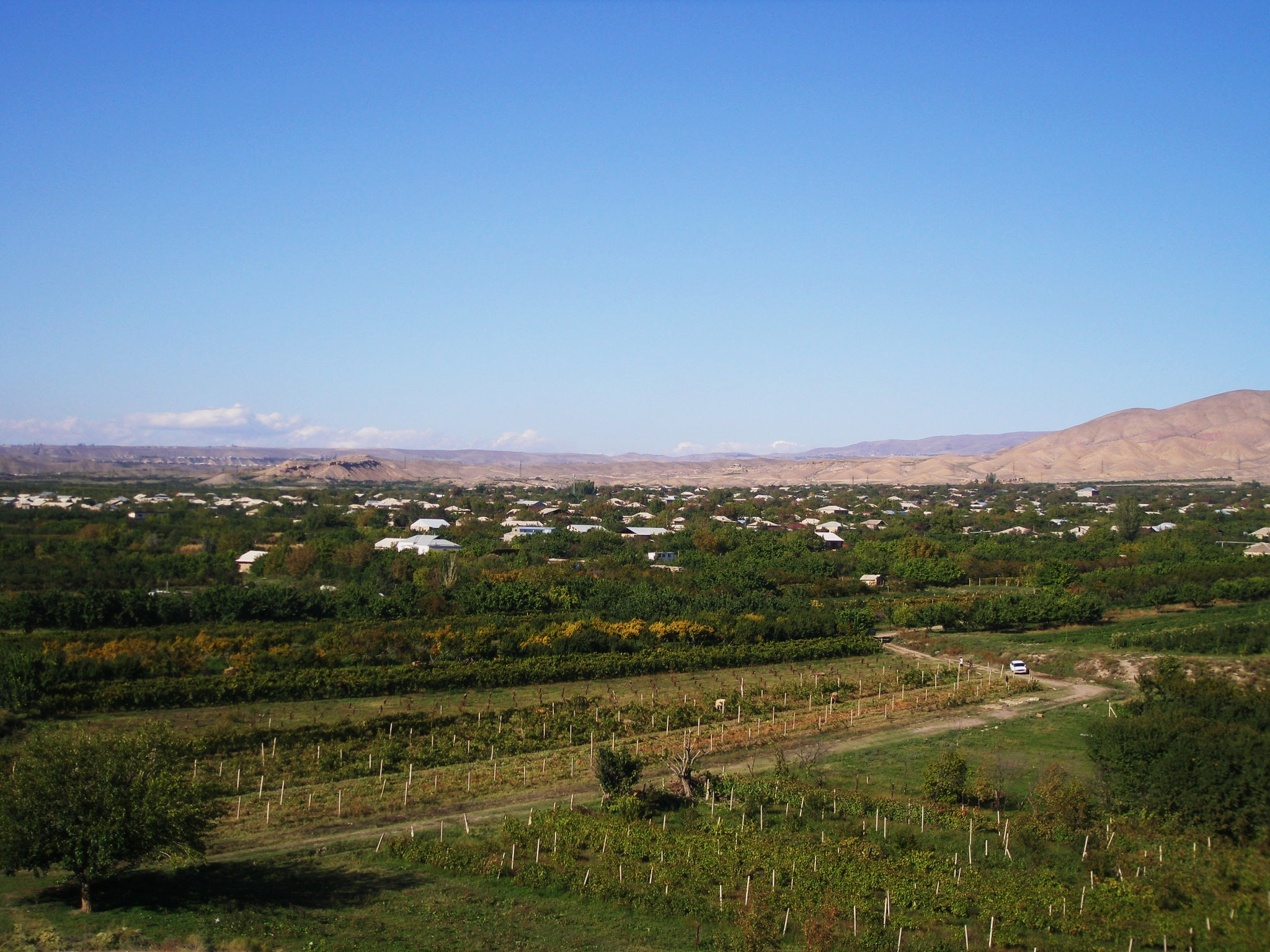
The village of Verin Dvin, predominantly populated by Assyrians

According to the 2022 official census, Ararat has a population of 248,982 (122,939 men and 126,043 women), forming around 8.5% of the entire population of Armenia. The urban population is 66,759 (26.8%) and the rural is 182,223 (73.2%). The province has 4 urban and 93 rural communities. The largest urban community is the provincial centre of Artashat, with a population of 19,020. The other urban centres are Ararat, Masis and Vedi.

With a population of 8,376, the village of Ayntap is the largest rural municipality of Ararat.

=== Ethnic groups and religion ===
The majority of the Ararat Province population are ethnic Armenians who belong to the Armenian Apostolic Church. The regulating body of the church is the Araratian Pontifical Diocese, headed by Archbishop Navasard Kchoyan (seat in Yerevan).

However, the village of Verin Dvin is predominantly populated by Assyrians belonging to the Assyrian Church of the East, whose ancestors migrated to Armenia from Iran during the 1st half of the 19th century. Almost half of the population of the village of Dimitrov is also Assyrian. The provincial centre Artashat is also home to a small Assyrian community. The approximate number of the Assyrians in Ararat Province is around 2,500.

== Administrative divisions ==
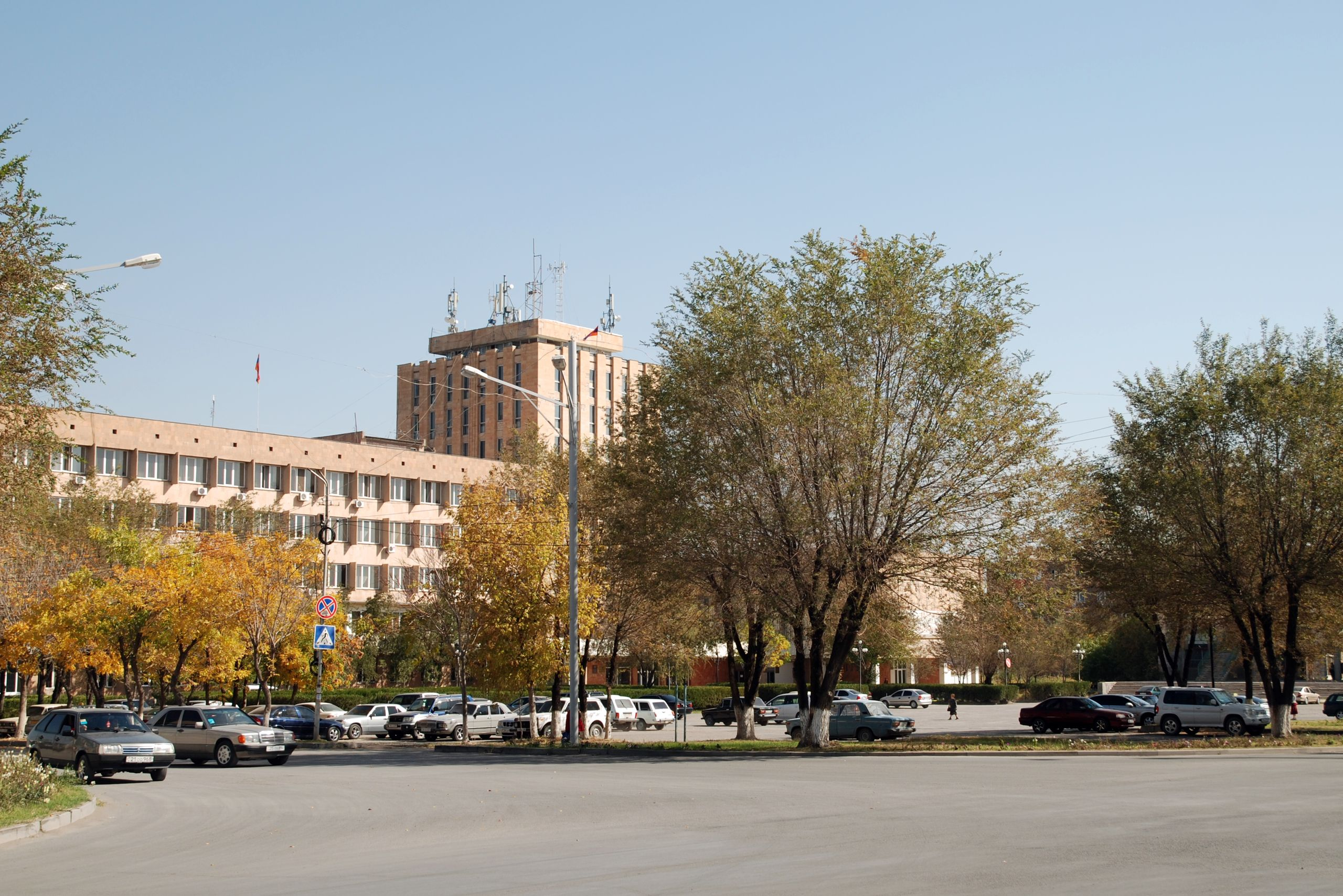
Ararat Province administration in Artashat

Ararat is currently divided into 5 municipalities (hamaynkner), of which 4 are consolidated and 1 community inhabited by Assyrians:

Municipality	Type	Area (km^{2})	Population (2022 census)	Centre	Included villages
Ararat Municipality	Urban	420.41	37,758	Ararat	Ararat, Avshar, Armash, Yeraskh, Zangakatun, Lanjar, Noyakert, Urtsalanj, Paruyr Sevak, Surenavan, Vardashat, Tigranashen
Artashat Municipality	Urban	620.76	86,598	Artashat	Abovyan, Azatavan, Aygezard, Aygepat, Aygestan, Araksavan, Arevshat, Baghramyan, Bardzrashen, Berdik, Berkanush, Byuravan, Burastan, Getazat, Dalar, Deghdzut, Dimitrov, Ditak, Dvin, Lanjazat, Kanachut, Kakavaberd, Hnaberd, Hovtashen, Masis, Mkhchyan, Mrganush, Mrgavan, Mrgavet, Narek, Nshavan, Norashen, Shahumyan, Vostan, Jrashen, Vardashen, Verin Artashat, Kaghtsrashen
Masis Municipality	Urban	18.73	76,751	Masis	Ayntap, Azatashen, Arbat, Argavand, Arevabuyr, Geghanist, Getapnya, Dashtavan, Darakert, Darbnik, Zorak, Khachpar, Hayanist, Hovtashat, Ghukasavan, Marmarashen, Nizami, Nor Kharberd, Nor Kyurin, Norabats, Noramarg, Jrahovit, Rranchpar, Sayat-Nova, Sis, Sipanik
Vedi Municipality	Urban	40.24	46,085	Vedi	Aygavan, Aralez, Ginevet, Goravan, Dashtakar, Yeghegnavan, Lanjanist, Lusashogh, Lusarat, Nor Kyank, Nor Ughi, Shaghap, Vosketap, Sisavan, Vanashen, Taperakan, Urtsadzor, Pokr Vedi
Verin Dvin Municipality	Rural	12.34	1,790	Verin Dvin	A community inhabited by a national minority (Assyrians).

During the recent years, many rural settlements in Ararat became abandoned, including the village of Kakavaberd.

== Culture ==
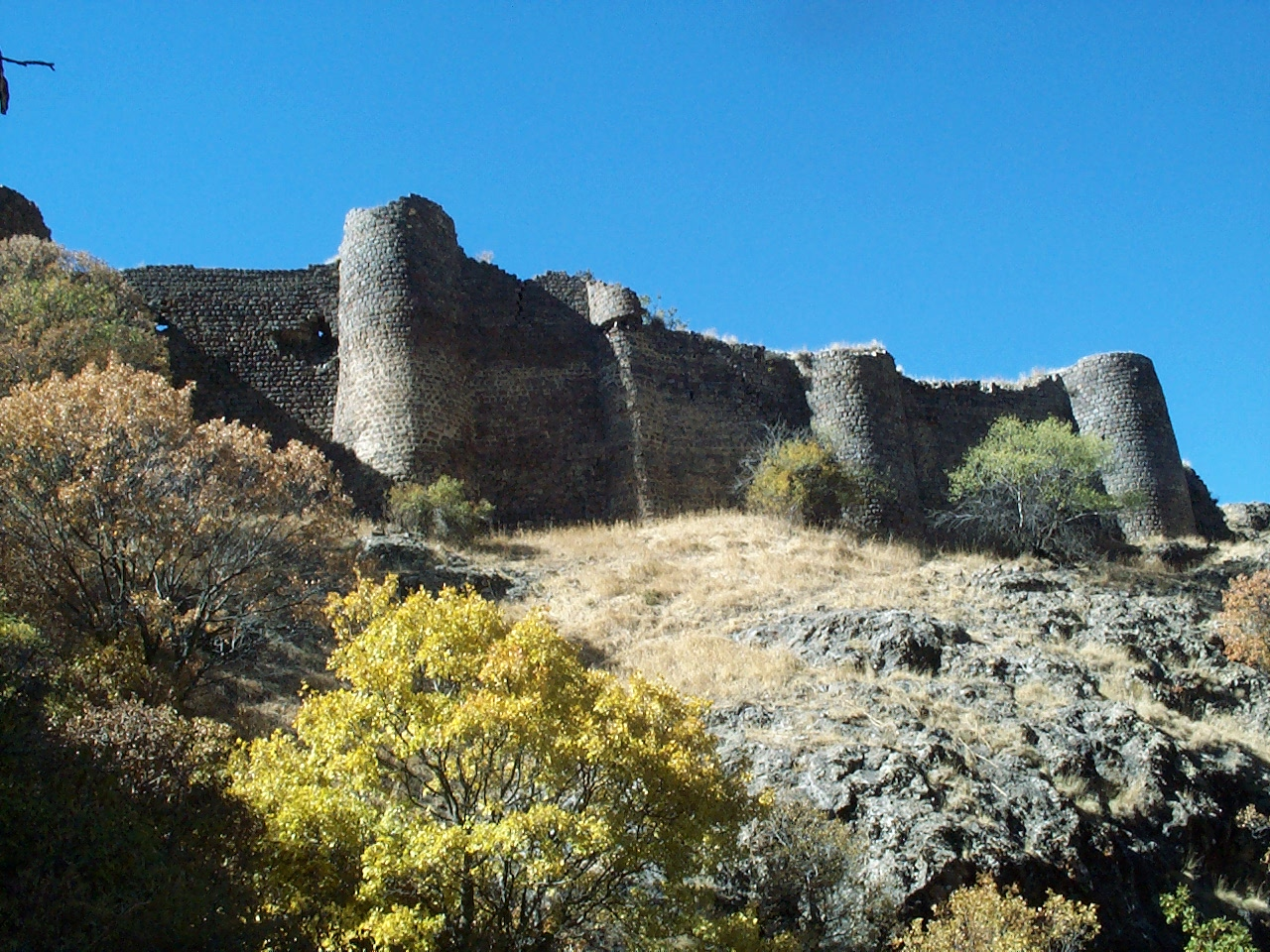
Kakavaberd fortress of the 4th century

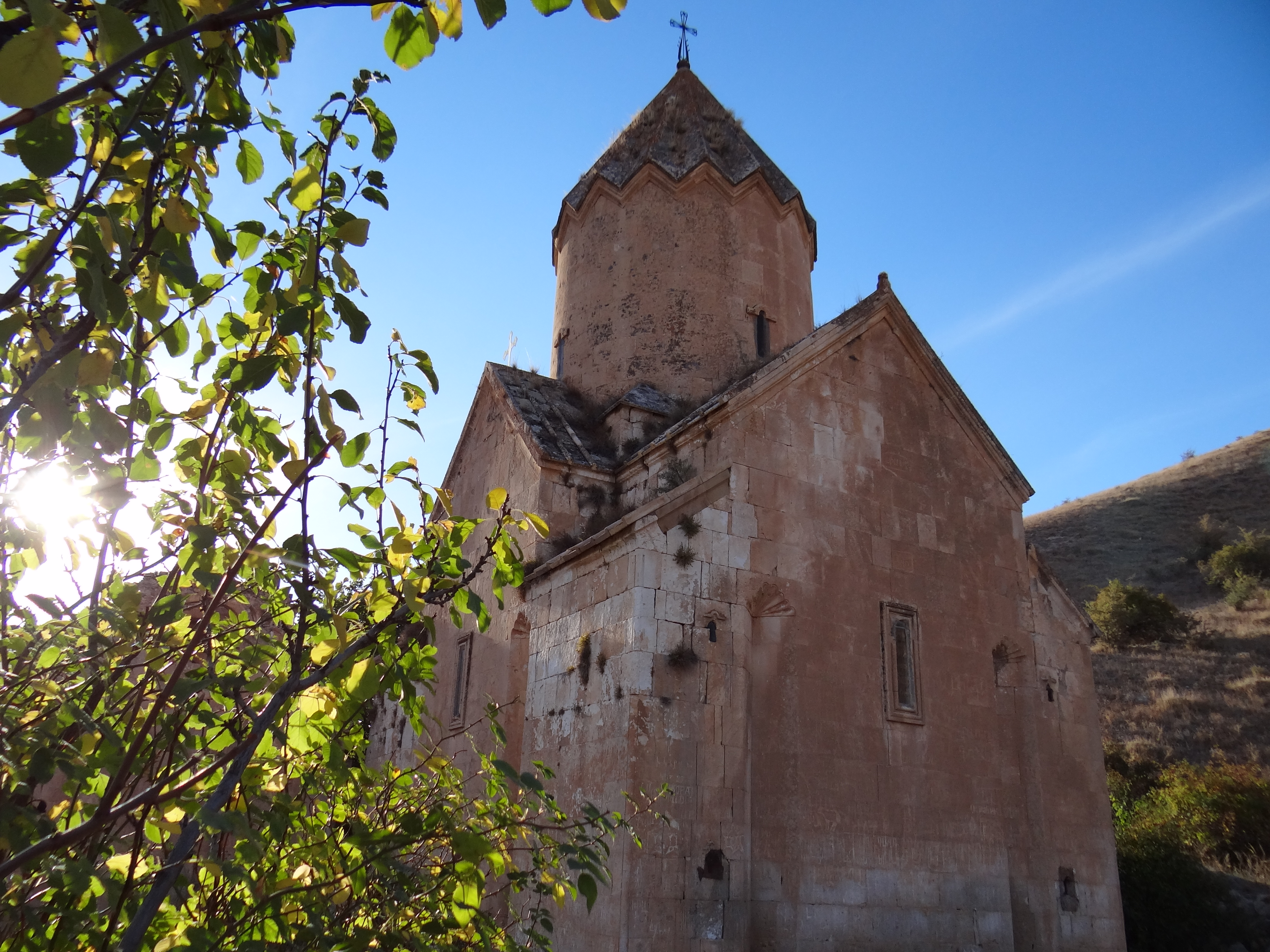
Hovhannes Karapaet Monastery of the 13th century

There are cultural palaces as well as public libraries in the towns of Ararat, Artashat, Masis and Vedi. The provincial centre Artashat is also home to the Amo Kharazyan drama theatre.

The province has many art academies, sport schools and musical schools, mainly in the urban settlements.

The House-museum of Vazgen Sargsyan is operating in the village of Ararat since 2001.

=== Fortresses and archaeological sites ===
- Ancient Artashat archaeological site,
- Ancient Dvin archaeological site,
- Kakavaberd fortress of the 4th century,
- Tapi Fortress of the 10th century,
- Mausoleum of Kara Koyunlu emirs in Argavand, built in 1413.

=== Churches and monasteries ===
- Aghjots Vank monastery of the 13th century,
- Hovhannes Karapaet Monastery near Shaghap, from the 13th century,
- Khor Virap monastery of the 17th century.

== Transportation ==
The M-2 Motorway that connects the capital Yerevan with southern Armenia and the Iranian border, passes through the Ararat Province.

The towns of Artashat and Ararat used to have a railway station that connected Yerevan with the Nakhchivan Autonomous Republic during the Soviet years.

== Economy ==
=== Agriculture and viticulture ===
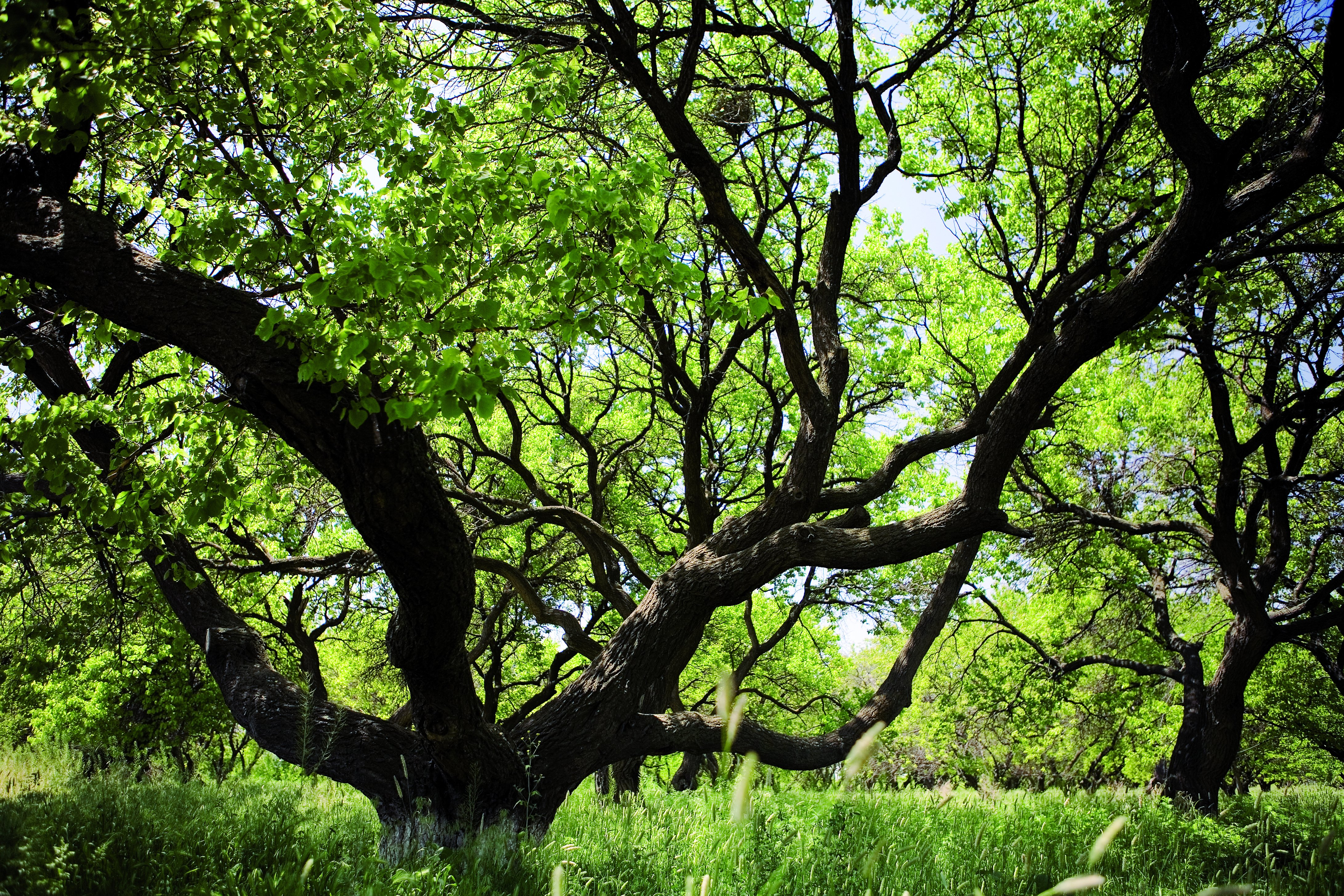
Apricot farms in Artashat

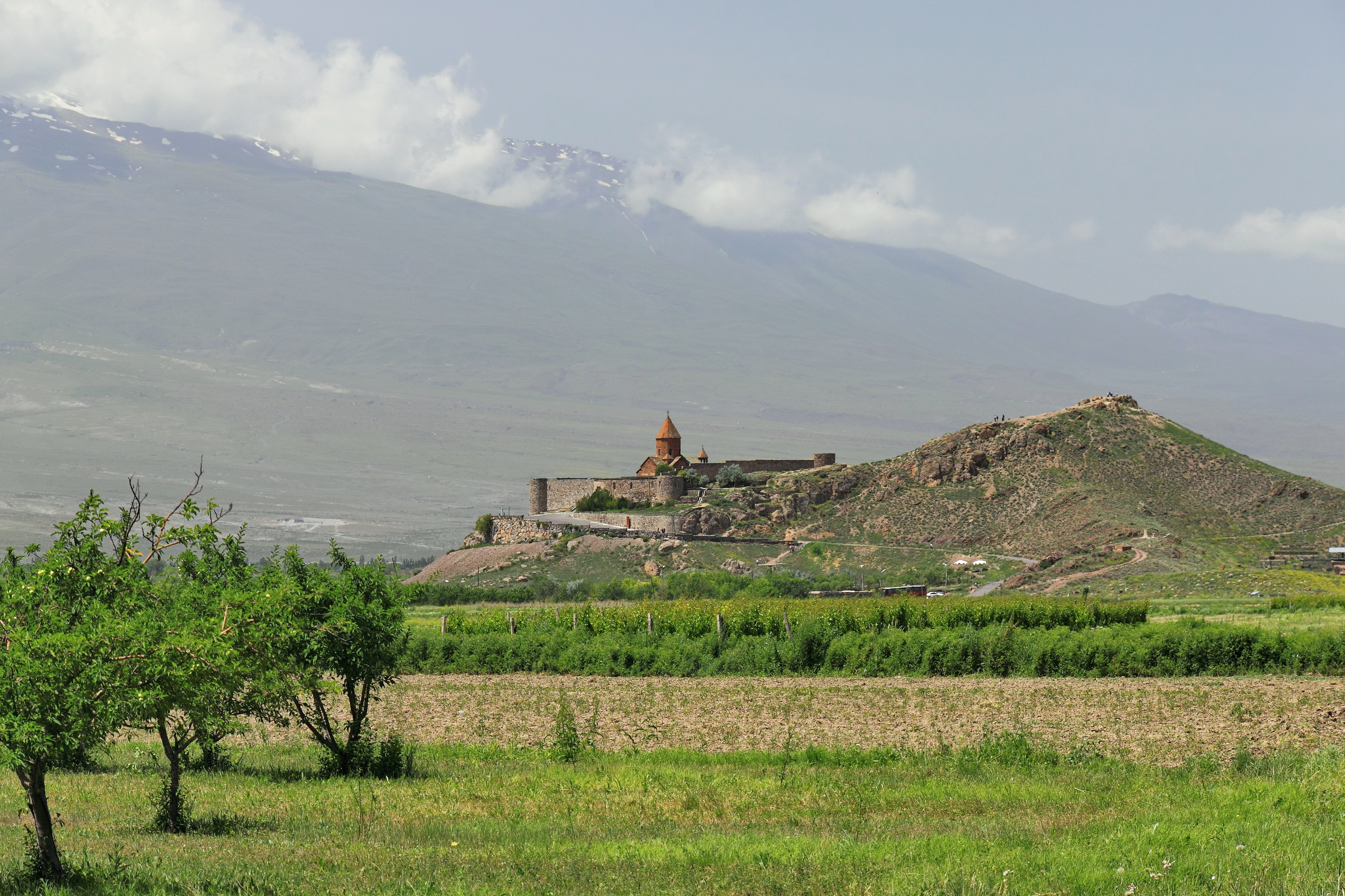
Vineyards near Khor Virap

Being located at the fertile Ararat plain, the province contributes with 15% in the annual total agricultural product of Armenia. Around 75% (1,567 km^{2}) of the total area of the province are arable lands, out of which 17.23% (270 km^{2}) are ploughed.

Orchards mainly produce grapes, apricot and peach. Other products include pear, apple, melon, watermelon, eggplant, grains and dry seed. Ararat is among the leading provinces of Armenia in wine production in terms of grape cultivation and wine export (along with the provinces of Ararat and Vayots Dzor).

The irrigation infrastructure of the province is quite developed. 90% of the farmlands are irrigated, mainly using canals opened from the rivers of Vedi and Azat.

The Geghanist village has a specialized plant in producing fertilizers and irrigation system design.

The province has 2 large poultry farms in the village of Kaghtsrashen and the town of Masis.

Recently, fish farming has significantly developed in the province. The largest fish farming ponds are located at the vicinity of Armash village.

=== Industry ===
Ararat is among the most industrialized provinces of Armenia with many large industrial firms. It currently has a contribution of 10% in the annual total industrial product of Armenia.

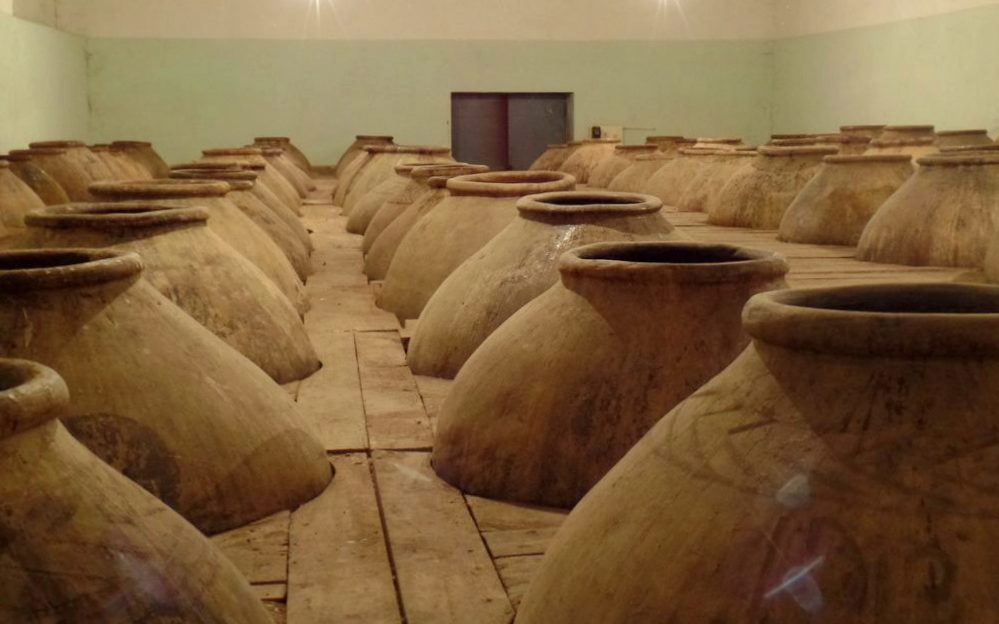
Wine cellars of "Shahumyan-Vin Winery"

- Production of alcoholic drinks is among the leading sectors in Ararat with a large number of factories spread all over the communities of the province. Major producers of the province include:
  - Aregak Brandy Factory, founded in 1889 in Dalar (privatized in 1992).
  - Ararat Wine Factory, founded in 1903 in Ararat village.
  - Artashat Vincon Winery, founded in 1905 in Mkhchyan (privatized in 1995).
  - Ararat Cognac Factory AKZ for brandy and wine, opened in 1932 in Avshar.
  - Aygezard Wine Factory, founded in 1936 in Aygepat.
  - Vedi Alco Winery for wine, brandy and vodka, founded in 1956 in Ginevet (privatized in 1994).
  - Avshar Wine Factory for wine, brandy and vodka, founded in 1968 in Avshar (privatized in 1995).
  - Yeraskh Wine Factory, founded in 1970 in Yeraskh.
  - Van 777 Winery for wine and brandy, founded in 1992 in Taperakan.
  - Agatat-Gold Winery for wine, brandy and vodka, founded in 2007 in Nor Kyurin.
  - Shato Arno Winery for wine and brandy, founded in 2002 in Ayntap.
  - Tavinko Winery for wine and brandy, founded in 2006 in Taperakan.
  - Mrganush Brandy Factory for vodka and brandy, opened in 2002 in Mrganush
  - Shaumyan-Vin Winery (wine, brandy, vodka), opened in 2006 in Shahumyan.
  - Shaumyan Alco for brandy and vodka, opened in 2007 in Artashat.
  - Abrikon Distillery for apricot vodka, opened in 2010 in Ararat village.
  - "Proshyan Brandy Factory-Aygestan Branch", in Aygestan.
- Preserved food production is also developed in the province. The "Artfood" Artashat Cannery (since 1961), the "Araratyan LLC" for dairy products in Kaghtsrashen, the "Lula LLC" for dairy products in Dalar, and the "Armenian Dried Fruits" plant of Surenavan (since 2007) are the leading firms in this sector.
- The town of Masis has an industrial hub that is home to many large firms. The town is a major centre for tobacco products in Armenia with its two factories: the "Masis Tobacco" company (SINCE 1999) and the "International Masis Tabak" company (since 2002). Other industries of Masis include the "ElektraMachTrade" factory for industrial equipments (since 1979), the "Grand-Master" corrugated cardboard packaging manufacturing ang label printing factory (since 1995), the "Masis Garun" clothing factory (since 1995), the "Berma" plant for asphalt concrete (since 1997), and the "Medical Horizon" factory for drugs and pharmaceuticals (since 2005).

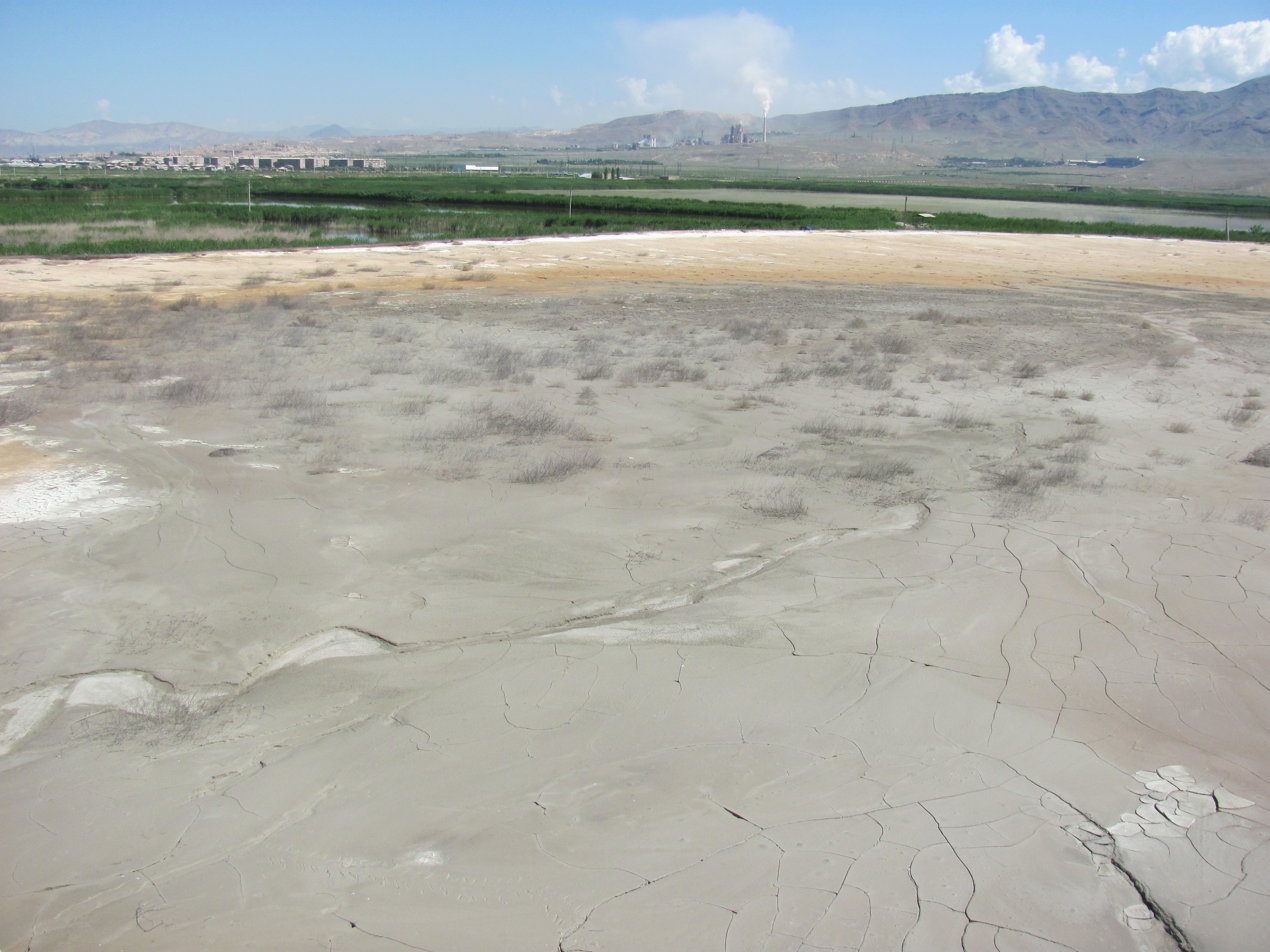
The controversial gold tailing dump in Ararat. The town of Ararat, the cement factory and the gold processing facility could be seen at the background from left to right, respectively

- The town of Ararat is home to the "Ararat Cement" factory and the "Geopromining Gold" recovery plant. However, there is a major controversy over the pollution and the toxic waste caused by the various enterprises based on the manufacturing of building materials and the gold processing facility in the town of Ararat. The Ararat Gold Recovery extracts gold from the raw ore sent from the gold mine in Sotk located 20 kilometres (12 miles) east of Lake Sevan. About 0.46 grams of gold is extracted from each ton of sand unearthed at the mines. The extraction process involves first pulverizing the raw material, and then filtering out the gold using a cyanide nitrate chemical process. The soupy byproduct of the cyanide nitrate chemical process is both toxic and radioactive and collects in a tailing dam. There have been numerous incidents of animals dying near and around the plant's area. Also, within the years 2003 and 2008, there have been at least 10 accidents at the plant, some of which have resulted in the discharge of the cyanide soup into neighboring agricultural lands and fisheries, killing off cows and fish stock.
- Other major firms in the province include the "AraratShin" construction company and building materials producers in Ararat (since 1984), the "Manana Stone" plant for building materials in Surenavan (since 1995), the "Vedi Plast" plastic products plant (since 1998) in Vedi, the "Zovashen" company for electrical power plants in Lanjazat (since 2001), the "Abit" Armenian-Russian asphalt factory (since 2009) in Surenavan, the "Izipanel" sandwich panels manufacturing plant in Artashat (since 2012), the "Ararat Group" mineral water factory in Artashat (since 2012), the "Kavashen" plant for building materials in Ararat, and the "Travertine" stone-processing plant in Vedi.

=== Tourism ===
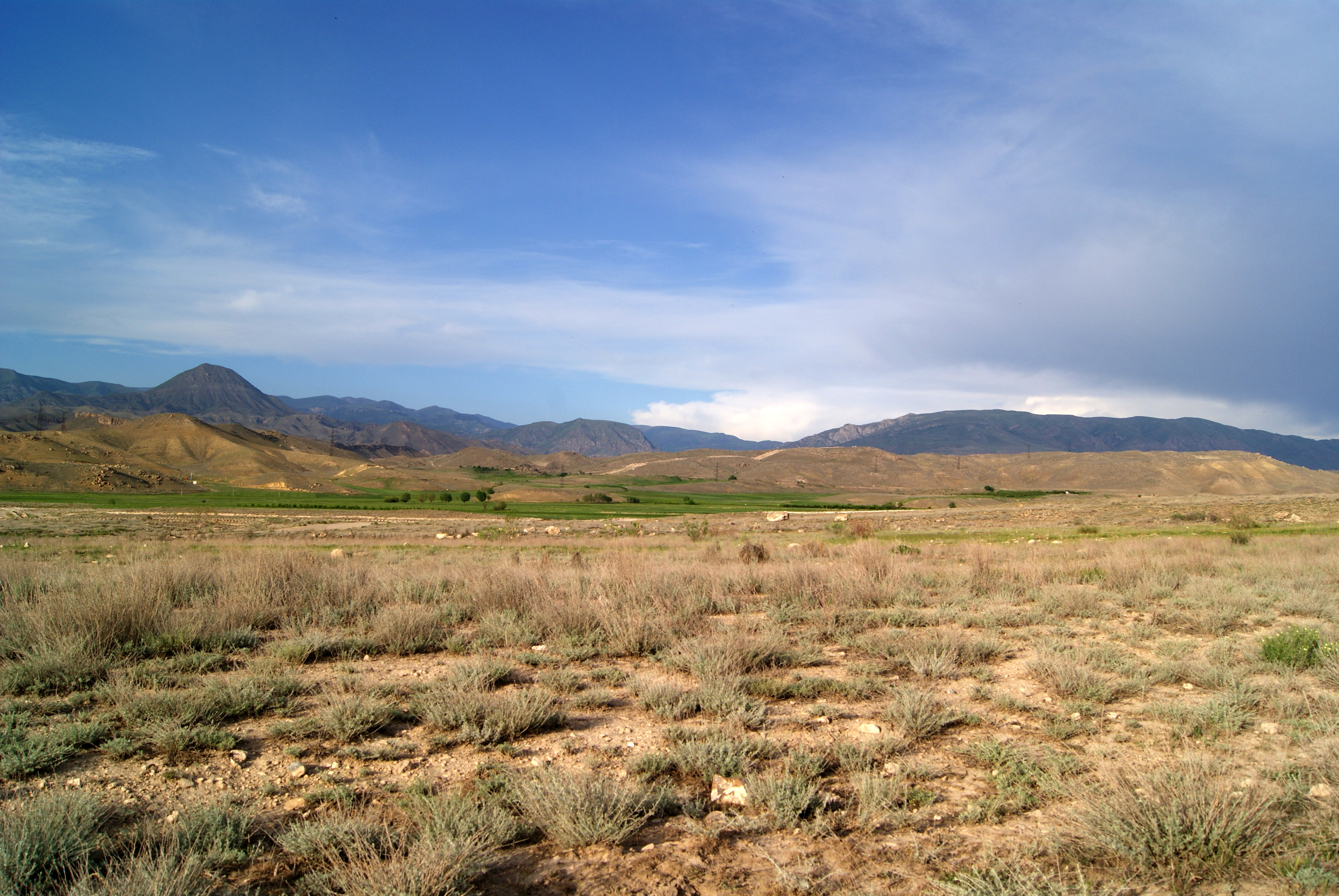
The Goravan Sands Sanctuary

The Khor Virap monastery is among the regular tourist destinations in Ararat Province. The ancient settlements of Artaxata and Dvin are among the attractive sites for archaeologists.

The province is home to many protected areas of nature including the Khosrov Forest State Reserve, the Goravan Sands Sanctuary and the Khor Virap Wildlife Sanctuary.

== Education ==
As of the 2015-16 educational year, Ararat Province has 112 schools, out of which 107 are operated by the province administration, while 5 are under the direct supervision of the Ministry of Education and Science. As of the end of 2015, the number of the students in the schools of the province is 31,457.

There are many public libraries and cultural houses in the towns of Artashat, Ararat, Masis and Vedi.

However, there are no higher education institutions in the province.

== Sport ==
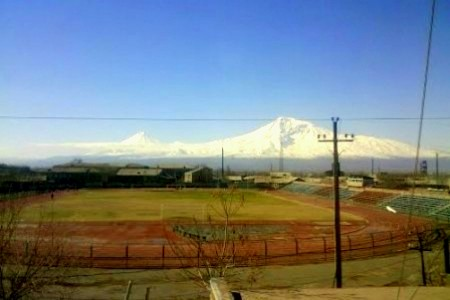
Artashat City Stadium

Araks Ararat founded in 1960 had represented the province in domestic and international football competitions. However, the club was and dissolved in 2001 due to financial difficulties.

At the end of 2001, another football club with the name of FC Araks was founded in Ararat, but lasted only 4 years before being dissolved.

FC Dvin Artashat founded in 1982, was also a prominent football club in the province. The remained in professional football until 1999, before being dissolved like most Armenian football clubs outside the capital Yerevan.

Masis FC played in the domestic completions between 1992 and 1994 when they were also dissolved.

There are 2 stadiums in the province: the Ayg Stadium of Ararat and the Artashat City Stadium. The latter is the regular home of the annual National Athletics Championship of Armenia.

== Gallery ==
Ararat

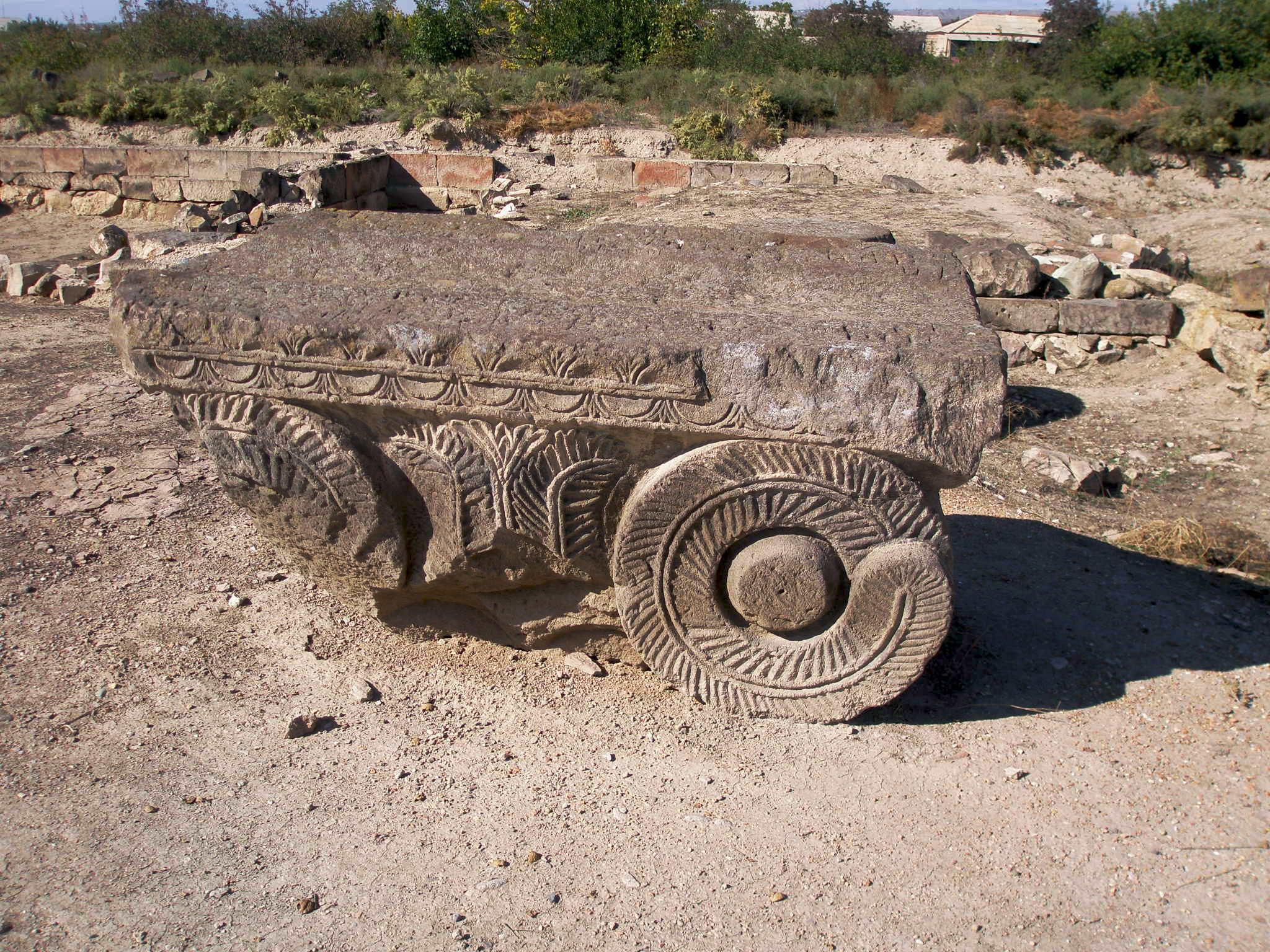
Capital of Saint Gregory Cathedral, ancient Dvin

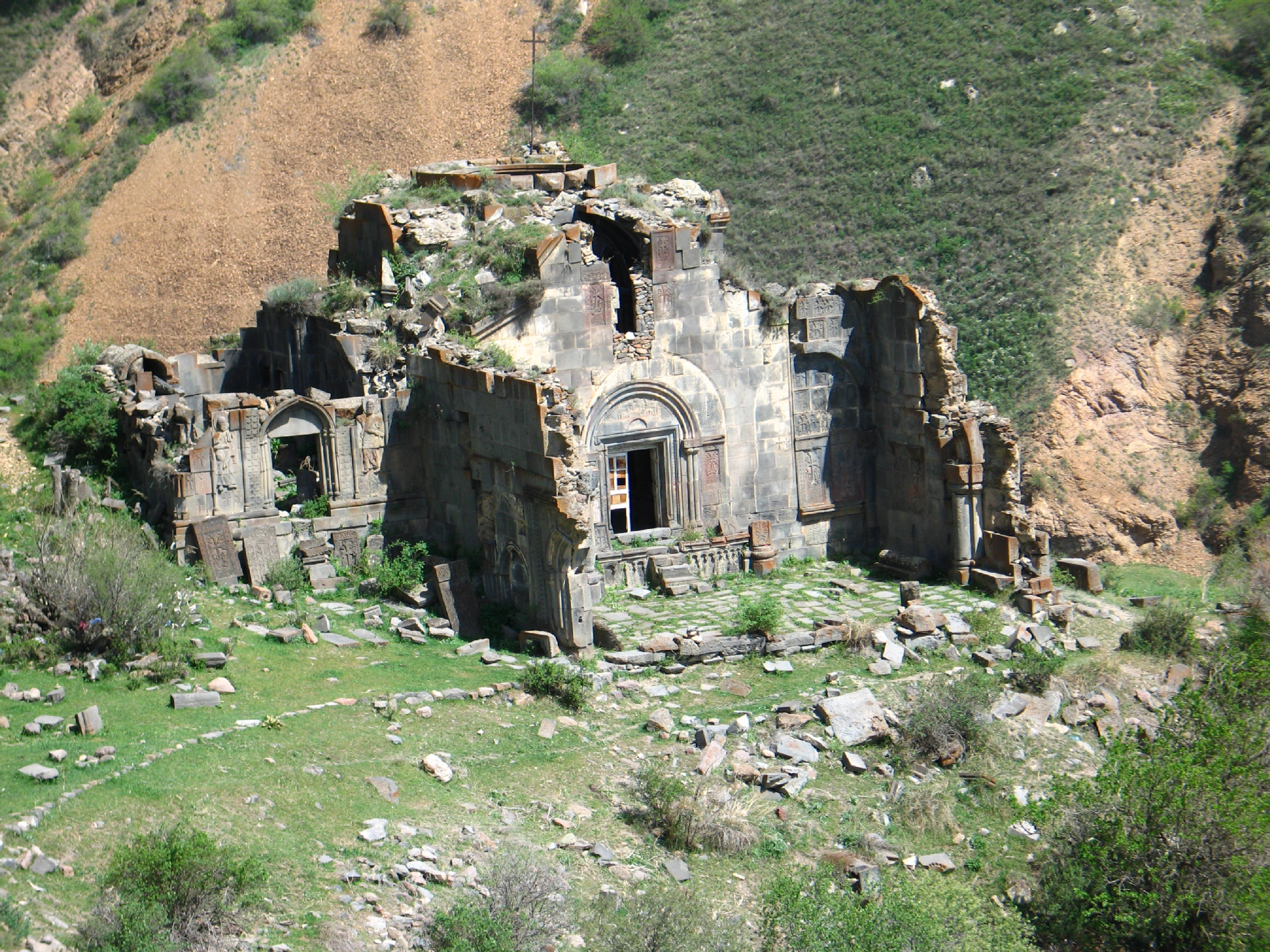
The remains of Aghjots Vank monastery

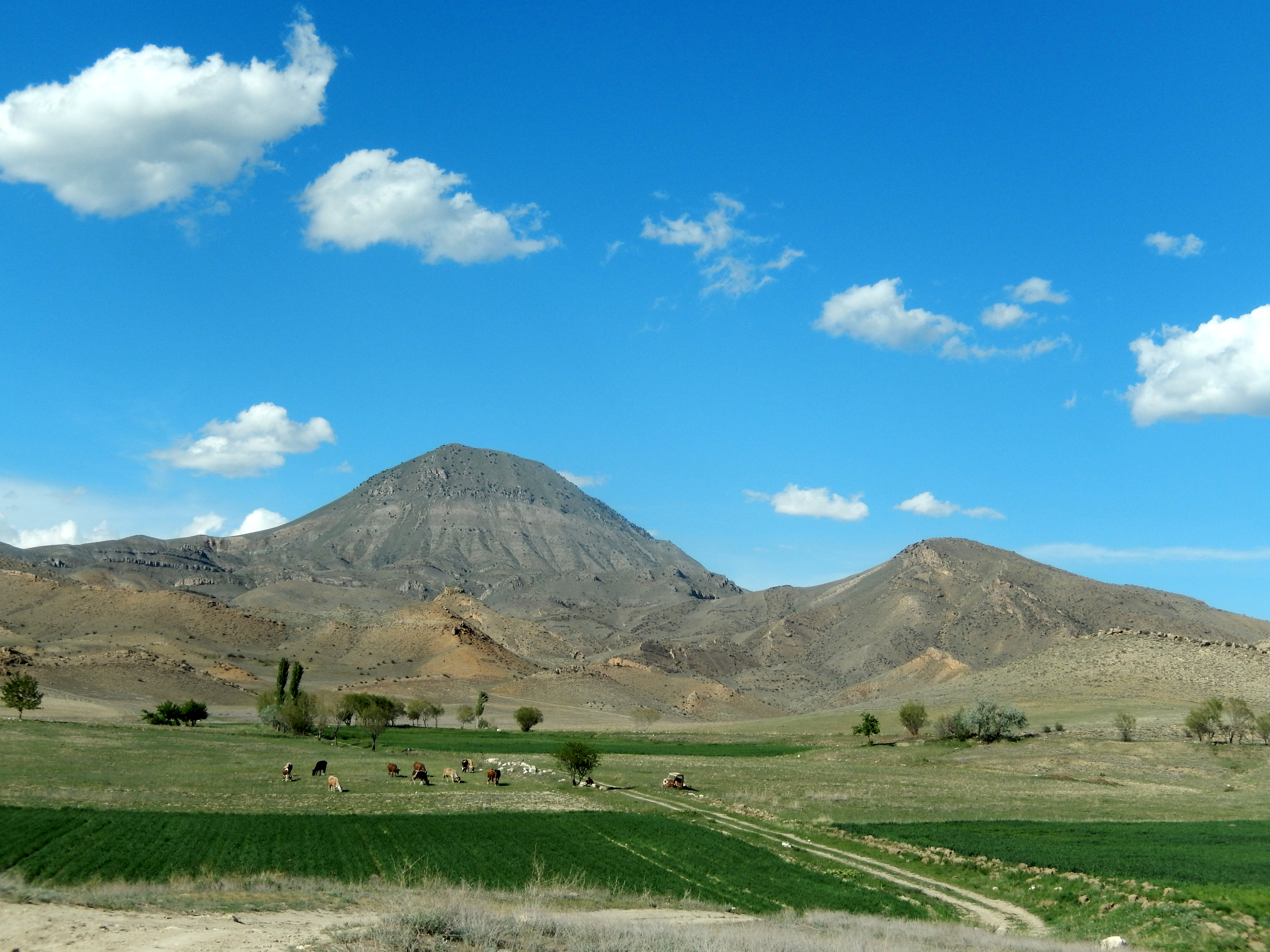
Mount Kotuts of the Urts mountain range at the centre of the province

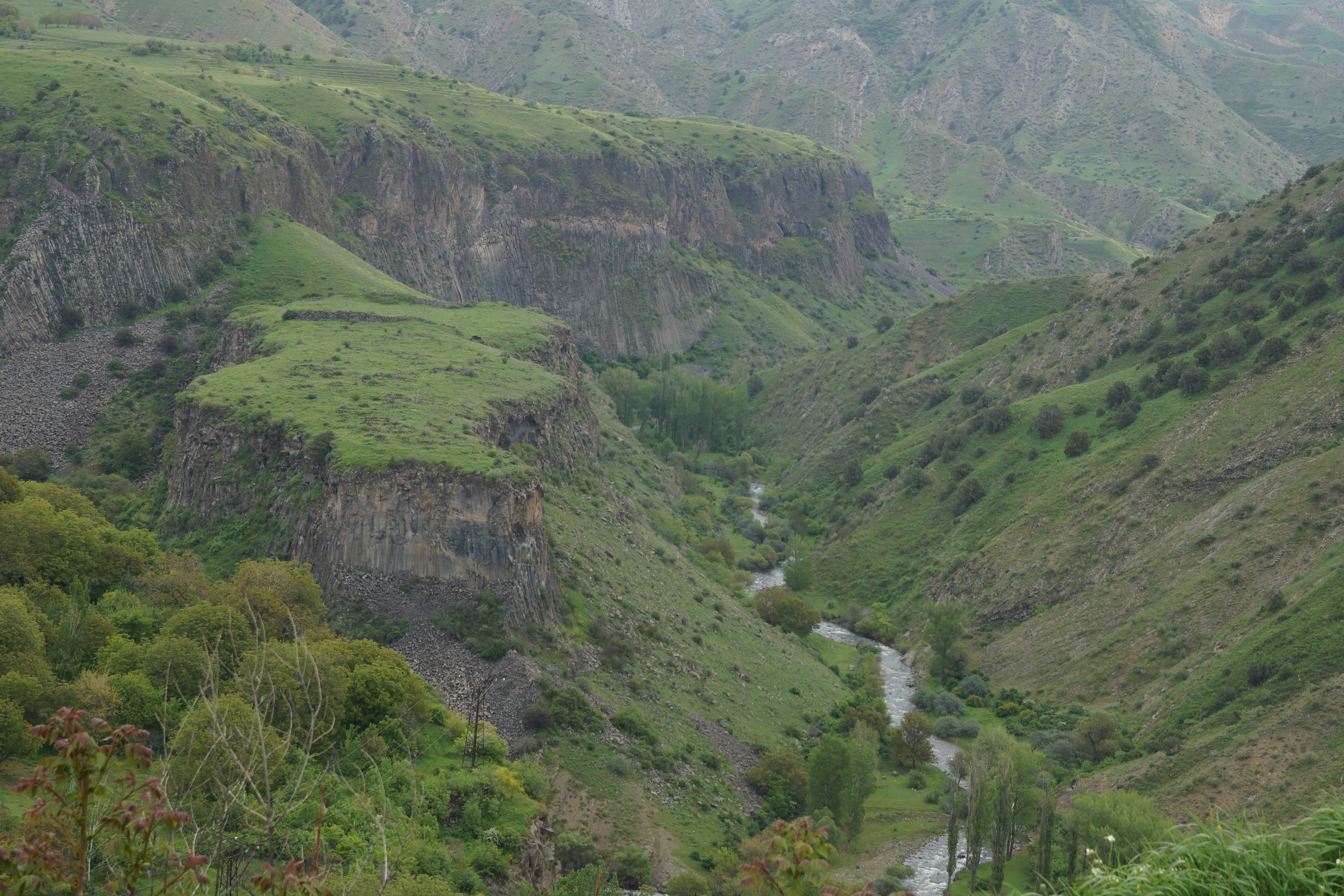
Khosrov Forest State Reserve

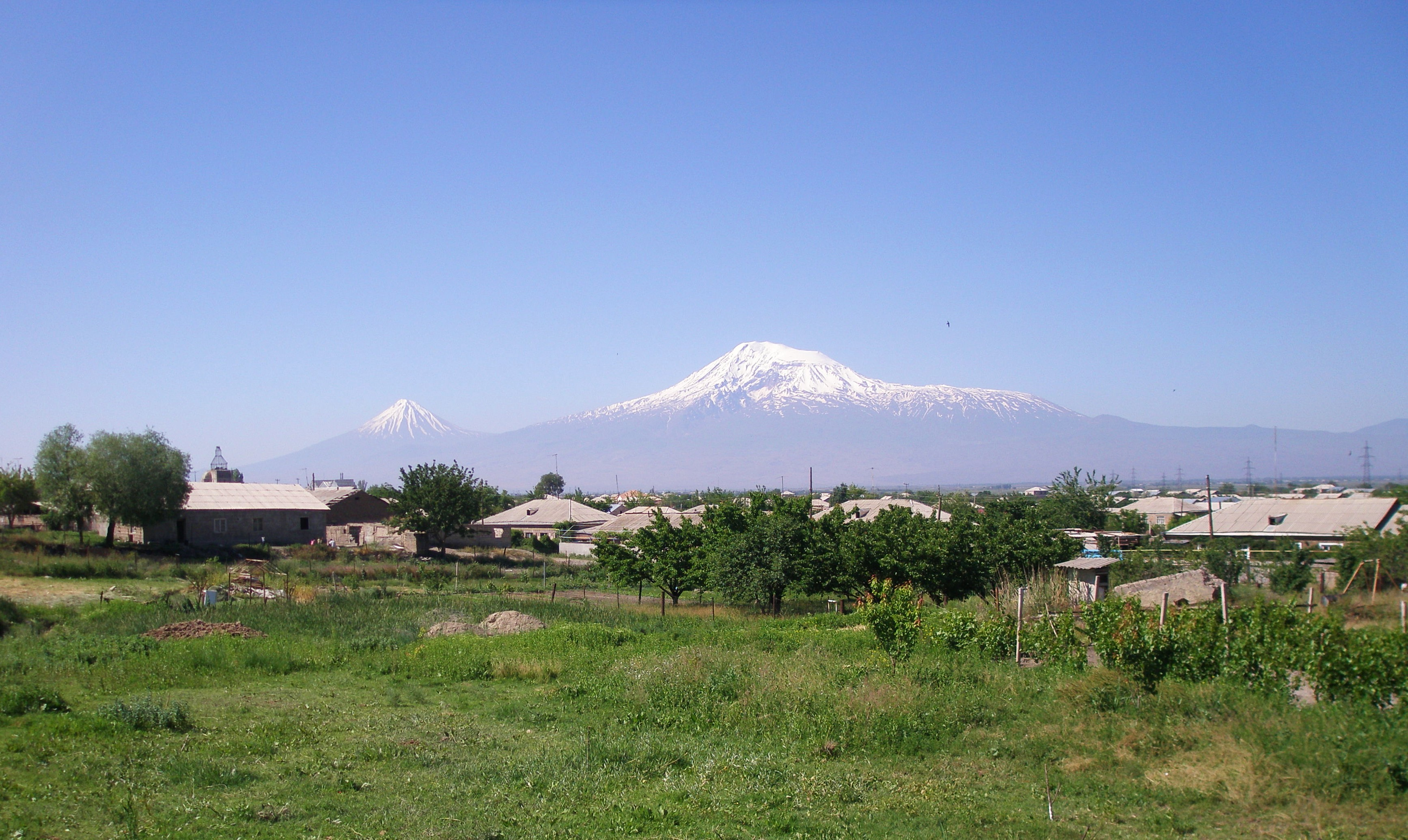
Ararat from Nor Kyurin village

== See also ==
- Ayrarat
- Gelaysor
- Ipakly
- Kharatlu
- Nerkin Kamarlu
- Niavan
- Sardzhalar
- Shorlu
- Urartu
