= Assyrians in Armenia =

Assyrians living in the Republic of Armenia

ܣܘܪ̈ܝܐ ܕܐܪܡܢܝܐ Ասորիները Հայաստանում
- (Assyrian homeland) (Armenia)
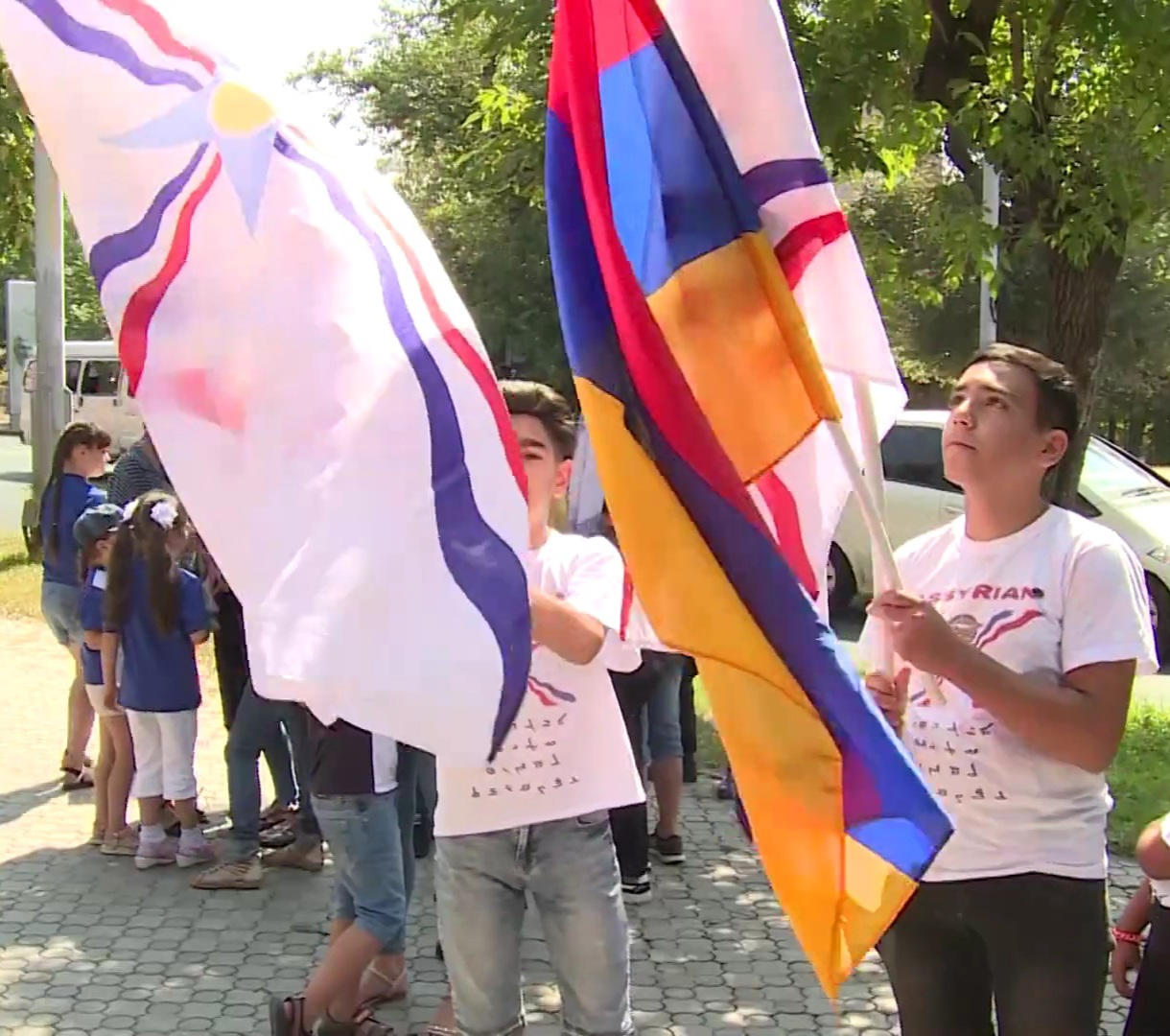
- A picture of young kids holding the Armenian and Assyrian flags in Yerevan

Total population
- 2,769 - 6,000

Regions with significant populations

Languages
- Armenian, Assyrian, Russian

Religion
- Christianity (majority: Assyrian Church of the East, minority: Russian Orthodox Church, Armenian Apostolic Church)

Assyrians in Armenia (Syriac: ܣܘܪ̈ܝܐ ܕܐܪܡܢܝܐ, Armenian: Ասորիները Հայաստանում, romanized: Asorinery Hayastanum), or Armenian Assyrians, are Assyrian people or people of Assyrian descent living in Armenia. The origins of Armenia's Assyrian community traces back to the Russo-Persian War (1826–1828) and the treaties of Gulistan and Turkmenchay, creating the first communities in the country as well as being the first instance of emigration creating an Assyrian diaspora. Assyrians also began to flee to Armenia following the Assyrian genocide.

According to the 2022 Armenian census, there are 2,755 Assyrians living in Armenia. They are predominantly present in the villages of Arzni, Dimitrov, Verin Dvin, and Nor Artagers, though some are also in the capital of Yerevan.

== History ==
=== Ancient history ===
The Assyrian–Armenian interrelations and interactions history numbers many centuries, both in pre-Christian and post-Christian era. According to the legend, the Armenian patriarch Hayk defeated the evil Assyrian ruler Bel in an epic battle, in order to win his people's freedom. He named this territory Hayastan, and the Armenians are still using this name. This legend is a part of Armenia's rich and storied history, where Armenian heroes fought against evil invaders and conquerors for their freedom. There is also the story of the Armenian king Ara the Beautiful who refused Assyrian Queen Semiramis’s offer to a marriage and become king of the world. Semiramis outraged by Ara's refusal, wages a war against Armenia and demands Ara's capture alive.

Prior to their acceptance of Christianity, Armenians and Assyrians were considered to be bitter foes, engaging in conflict during the Urartu–Assyria War. The conflict resulted in an Assyrian victory, and Urartu became a client state of ancient Assyria. Both states shared aspects of their culture, such as writing and artwork. Armenians also had a prominent presence in Edessa and made contacts with Assyrians in areas where the Syriac Orthodox Church had episcopal sees such as Adana and Anazarbus. Armenians traditionally called Assyrians "Asori" (Armenian: ասորի), and many Armenian Christian figures were of Assyrian origins.

=== Modern history ===
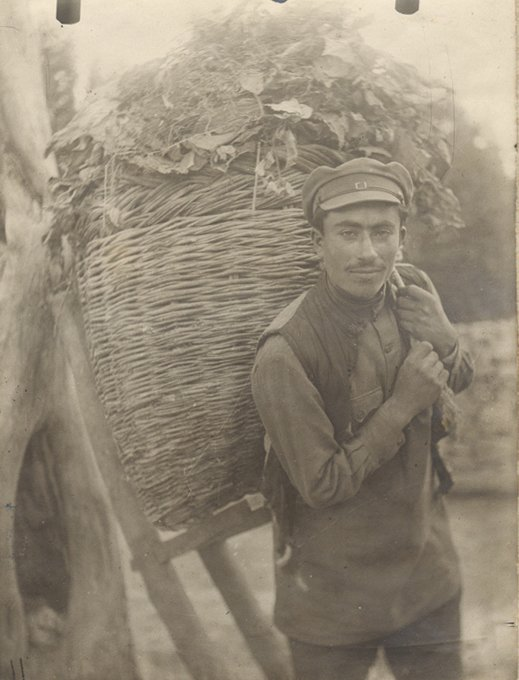
1938 photo of a young Assyrian in Arzni carrying grass

Today's Assyrian population in Armenia are mostly descendants of settlers who arrived in the early nineteenth century during the Russo-Persian War (1826–1828), when thousands of refugees fled their homeland in the areas around Urmia in Persia. Like with Assyrians in Azerbaijan, emigration was influenced by the Russian Empire after the treaties of Gulistan and Turkmenchay, when they annexed territories held by Qajar Iran. A total of 20 families settled in the now-abandoned town of Gelaysor, marking the first instance of Assyrian emigration to the country as well as emigration creating an Assyrian diaspora. Under Russian influence, Assyrian immigrants adopted Orthodox Christianity and had their last names Russified.

In the beginning of the 20th century, a new wave of immigration occurred from what is today Southeastern Turkey, specifically the Hakkari region, due to the Assyrian genocide. As many Armenians fled Anatolia for what is today Armenia, many Assyrians followed as well, citing it as the only "Christian haven" in the region (although many also fled to Georgia). There were seven Assyrian villages in the country during this time, and the population reached 2,500 before World War I.

In the Armenian Soviet Socialist Republic, Assyrians were primarily educated in Russian language schools and their language was latinized. Despite introduction of the language, Russification policies caused schools to be closed in the 1930s. Gelaysor had been abandoned by the 1940s after Stalinist repression and Soviet deportations, and some of the population had resettled in other villages. Starting in the 1970s, the Armenian SSR began to reintroduce Assyrian language into village schools, and after the dissolution of the Soviet Union, a linguistic and cultural revival began to take place as Assyrians wanted greater understanding of their roots. Amid the First Nagorno-Karabakh War, Assyrians in Azerbaijan would flee to Russia and Armenia, as well as the Republic of Artsakh.

On the eve of the Eastern al-Hasakah offensive and attacks on Assyrian villages in Syria in 2015, Gagik Yeganyan of the Armenian State Migration Service stated that Armenia was willing to accept Assyrian refugees fleeing the country.

In 2020, amid the Second Nagorno-Karabakh War, many Assyrians from Armenia volunteered to fight or provide assistance to the Armed Forces of Armenia for the defense of Artsakh against Azerbaijan. Five Assyrian soldiers had been killed by November 2020, with six additional servicemen wounded and two who were missing in action. Anahit Khosroeva, a genocide scholar of Assyrian descent from Armenia, estimated that more than 100 Assyrians were fighting for Armenia. AssyriaTV, a station based in Europe, arrived to Armenia to report the war as well as talk to the Assyrian families who lost their sons in the war. During the blockade of Nagorno-Karabakh as part of the larger Nagorno-Karabakh conflict, member of parliament Zemfira Mirzoyeva testified how Artsakh's Assyrian community had been unable to leave the region due to the actions of the Azerbaijani government.

In 2022, Catholicos-Patriarch of the Assyrian Church of the East Awa III met with Karekin II of the Armenian Apostolic Church where both emphasized the positive relations between Assyrians and Armenians. Awa III consecrated the Church of the Assyrian community of Armenia during his visit. In 2025, the Assyrian World Conference was held in Yerevan, with Armenian prime minister Nikol Pashinyan emphasizing the importance of Assyrians to Armenian society.

== Discrimination ==
In 2004, Assyrian residents of Dimitrov alleged that they were discriminated against due to their non-Armenian origin, as they had failed to receive local aid from government authorities. The Armenian government was quick to deny the allegations, and Hranush Kharatyan stated that discontent with the Dimitrov village chief was high even among ethnic Armenians for the same reasons.

In 2021, Assyrians in Armenia protested against a decision by the Armenian government to have their towns governed by one mayor. Nikademus Youkhanaev, a priest of the Assyrian Church of the East in Armenia, stated that the decision would cause problems regarding the erosion of Assyrian culture and identity in Armenia.

The Azerbaijani Center for International Relations Analysis states that from 2015-2018, no grants were given to the Assyrian community through the "Support to National Minorities" program, and that Assyrian schools are inadequate in teaching history and language; similar issues of teaching language have been previously discussed by community leaders such as Razmik Khosroev. In 2019, a dispute broke out over the ownership of a church in Dimitrov, with attempts to solve the dispute by the village head being unsuccessful. Irana Gasparyan, an Assyrian community leader in Armenia, alleges that Assyrians face invisible discrimination in preserving culture and the Armenian workforce.

== Culture ==
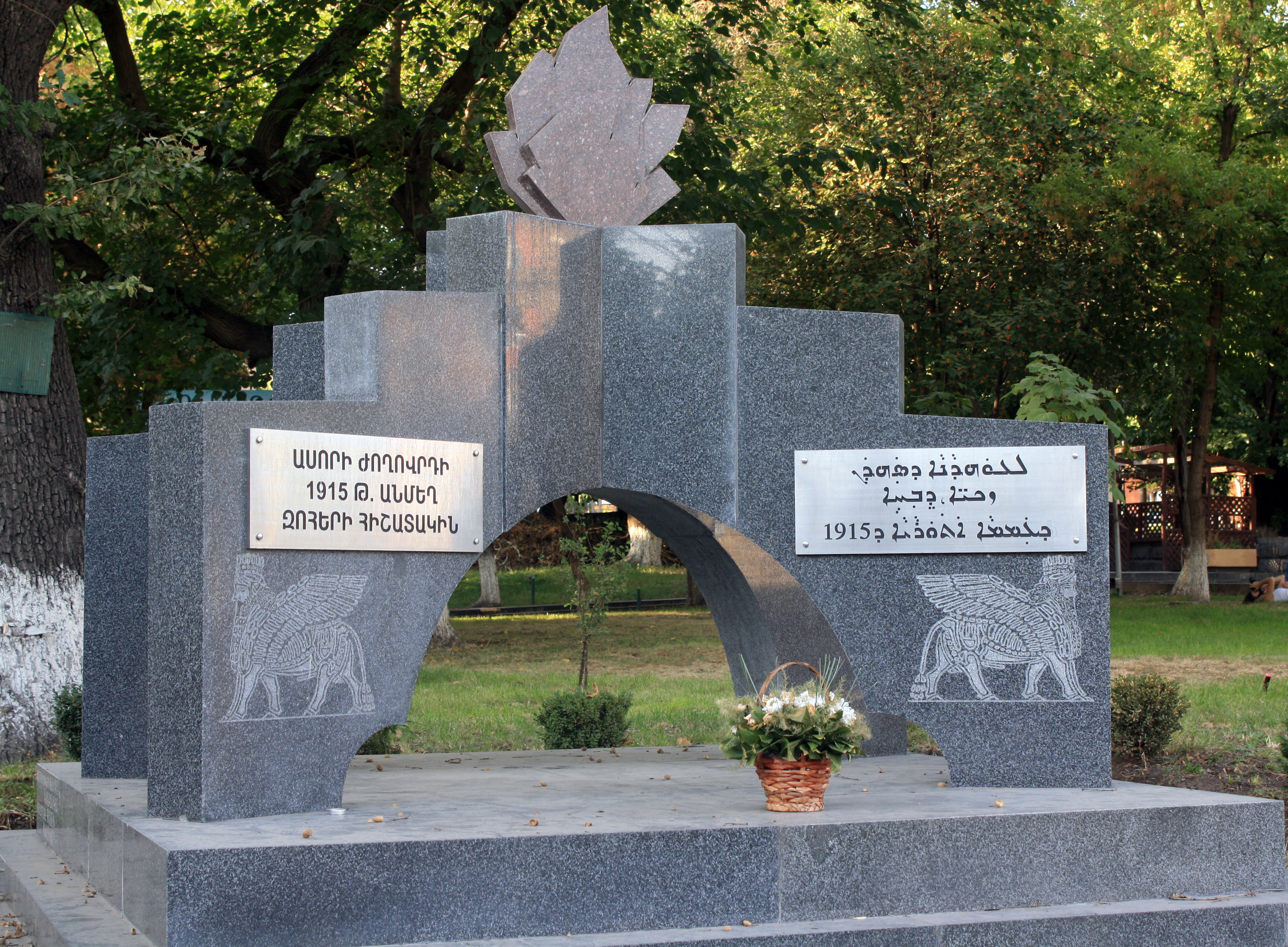
Assyrian genocide memorial in Yerevan

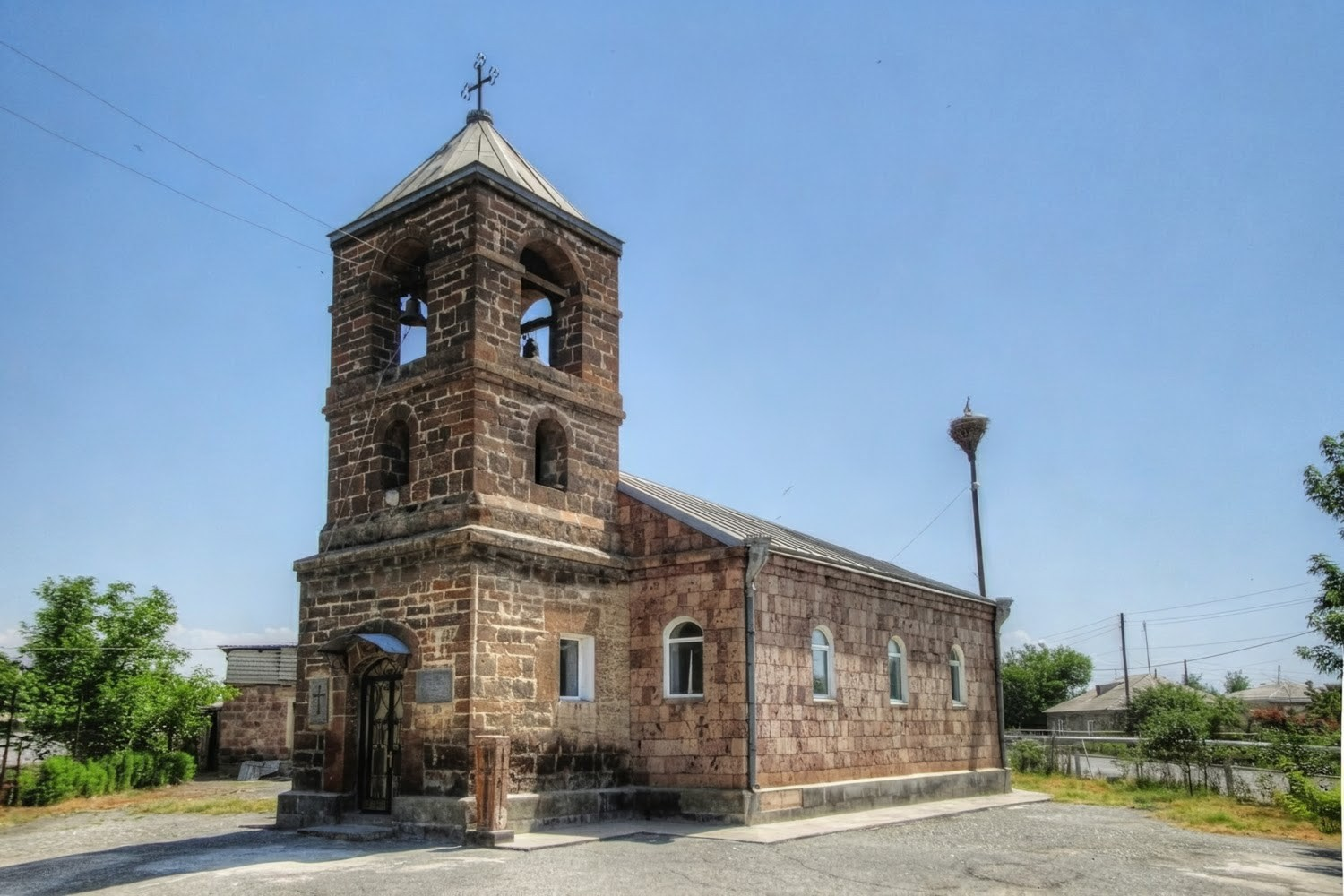
St. Kirill Assyrian church in Dimitrov

Assyrians in Armenia mostly work in the fields of gardening, agriculture and viniculture. The Assyrian community in the country has mostly acclimated to the environment, siding with Armenian causes and are even married into mixed-Armenian families. Generally, positive relations are maintained between the two groups in the country and in both the Armenian and Assyrian diasporas.

The Assyrian community in Armenia has received an annual message of congratulations on the occasion of Kha b-Nisan (Assyrian New Year) on 1 April between the years of 2019–2025. Other ACOE-specific holidays are also observed, and general facets of Assyrian culture such as Khigga, cuisine, and music are also celebrated by the Assyrian community in Armenia.

In the Armenian capital of Yerevan is the Assyrian Association, 'Atour', in the Armenian capital of Yerevan. Assyrian culture has begun a revival process in the country, with greater language/culture education and religious initiatives taking place across Assyrian communities in the country. The Armenian government offers finances and support to Assyrians in the country for programs related to the language, including radio hours. However, according to Razmik Khosroev, the Armenian government is not doing a sufficient job in allocating cultural development programs for Assyrians as no sufficient policy exists for minorities in the state, and concerns of Armenianization/cultural preservation remain.

In 2012, a memorial to the Assyrian genocide was enacted in Yerevan and unveiled in a ceremony with Armenian government representatives and Assyrians from the country. The memorial contains inscriptions in Armenian, Assyrian, and Russian, and memorial ceremonies are commemorated annually on Assyrian Martyrs Day. Three years later, the National Assembly of Armenia officially recognized the Assyrian genocide alongside the Greek genocide. Annually on April 24, the Assyrian community commemorates Armenian Genocide Remembrance Day at the Tsitsernakaberd memorial complex.

=== Education ===
Each village inhabited by Assyrians has instructions fully in the language, with additional lessons on culture and history at schools. They are usually taught in a multilingual environment and can speak Armenian and Russian as well. Many Assyrians in Armenia desire Russian-language education after learning Assyrian Neo-Aramaic, with more stating fluency in Russian in the 2011 census.

=== Religion ===
Assyrians in Armenia today mostly belong to Assyrian Church of the East, receiving their first ACOE priest in 2003, but may also attend the Russian Orthodox or Armenian Apostolic churches. Most Assyrians living in Armenia are not cognizant of religious identity, however, and may accept any Christian religious belief irrespective of denomination.

A Russian Orthodox parish is present in Dimitrov, where the majority of attendees are Armenian or Assyrian. Since the 2000s, an ACOE-parish has been present in Verin Dvin; the town has a functioning church (Mar-Tuma) and the Marez Orthodox Chapel.

== Demographics ==
There were 6,000 Assyrians in Armenia before the dissolution of the Soviet Union, but because of Armenia's struggling economy during the 1990s, the population has since been cut by half, as many have emigrated to Russia or Ukraine. Today, Assyrians are the third largest ethnic minority in Armenia after Yazidis and Russians.

The Assyrian population in Armenia is mainly rural. Out of 3,409 Assyrians in Armenia in 2001, 2,885 (84.6%) lived in rural settlements while 524 (15.4%) were urban. In the 2022 census, 347 Assyrians lived in cities while the remainder lived in villages. According to the Council of Europe European Charter for Regional or Minority Languages, there were four rural settlements in the country with a significant Assyrian population:

1. Arzni in Kotayk Province - Assyrians and Armenians
2. Verin Dvin, Ararat Province - Assyrians and Armenians. 80% of the town's population is ethnically Assyrian.
3. Dimitrov, Ararat Province - Assyrians and Armenians. 25% of the town's population is ethnically Assyrian.
4. Nor Artagers in Armavir Province - Assyrians, Armenians and Yezidis. 256 Assyrians live in the village.

Verin Dvin has the largest Assyrian population anywhere in the country. Aside from rural settlements, Assyrians also live in the Armenian capital of Yerevan and formerly in the Republic of Artsakh. During the 2015 census for the Republic of Artsakh, 16 Assyrians were recorded as having lived there, while the overwhelming majority of the population were ethnic Armenians.

Historical population
Year	Pop.	±%
1939	3,280	—
1970	5,544	+69.0%
1979	6,183	+11.5%
1989	5,963	−3.6%
2001	3,409	−42.8%
2011	2,769	−18.8%
2022	2,755	−0.5%
Sources: 1939, 1970, 1979, 1989, 2001, 2011, 2022

== Notable people ==
- Lina Yakubova (1976 – 2011), documentary film maker and producer

== See also ==
- Assyrian diaspora
- Assyrian genocide
- Assyrians in Azerbaijan
- Assyrians in Georgia

== Bibliography ==
- Asatryan, Garnik; Arakelova, Victoria (2002). "The Ethnic Minorities of Armenia" (PDF). hra.am. Yerevan. Archived from the original (PDF) on 11 May 2011.
- Dum-Tragut, Jasmine; Gyozalyan, Lilia (2007). The "Assyrians" of Armenia (PDF). Conference on the Languages of the Caucasus. Leipzig, Germany: Max Planck Institute for Evolutionary Anthropology.
- Evstratov, Anton G. (2022). "Problems and Peculiarities of the Integration of Ethnic Minorities into the Armenian Society on the Example of the Assyrians". History, Archeology and Ethnography of the Caucasus. 18 (3). Yerevan: 843–860. doi:10.32653/CH183843-860.
- Harutyunyan, Ashot (2011). "Genetic Affinity of Assyrians living in Armenia to different ethnic groups of the Near East and South Caucasus" (PDF). Biology Journal of Armenia. 4 (63). Armenian National Academy of Sciences: 46–50.
- Huseynova, Ilaha (15 October 2020), Analysis - Being Assyrian in Mono-ethnic Armenia (PDF), Baku: The Center for International Relations Analysis, p. 4
- Khachatryan, Hranush Shavarsh (25 July 2010). "Religion and the Secular State in Armenia". In Martínez-Torrón, Javier; Durham, W. Cole (eds.). Religion and the Secular State: National Reports (PDF). Brigham Young University: International Center for Law and Religion Studies. pp. 79–86. ISBN 978-1-934537-91-6.
- Naby, Eden (2004). "The Assyrian diaspora: Cultural survival in the absence of state structure". In Atabaki, Touraj; Mehendale, Sanjyot (eds.). Central Asia and the Caucasus: Transnationalism and diaspora. Routledge. pp. 214–230. ISBN 9781134319947.
