= List of Assyrian ethnic enclaves =

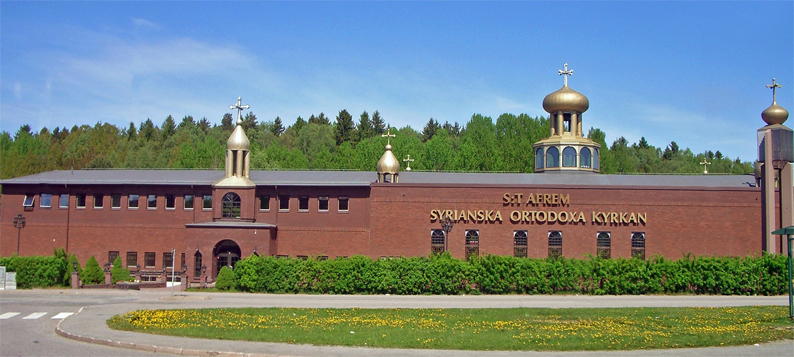
Mar Afrem cathedral in Södertälje, which is unofficially called "the Assyrian capital of Europe"

This is a list of Assyrian ethnic enclaves, containing cities, districts, and neighborhoods with predominantly Assyrian population, or are associated with Assyrian culture, either currently or historically. Most numbers are estimates by various organizations and media, because many countries simply do not collect data on ethnicity.

== Extant enclaves ==
=== Europe ===
Name	Type	Location	Assyrian population	Ref
Södertälje	town	Sweden, Södermanland	39.0%	
Sarcelles	commune	France, Île-de-France	34.14%	
Urmia	village	Russia, Krasnodar Krai	71.0%	
Enschede	city	Netherlands, Overijssel	7.4%	
Gütersloh	city	Germany, North Rhine-Westphalia	11.7%	

=== Asia ===
Name	Type	Location	Assyrian population	Ref
Arzni	village	Armenia, Kotayk	Majority	
Verin Dvin	village	Armenia, Ararat	74.1%	
Dimitrov	village	Armenia, Ararat	14.0%	
Nor Artagers	village	Armenia, Armavir	21.0%	
Dzveli Kanda	village	Georgia, Mtskheta-Mtianeti	80.0%	

=== America and Australia ===
Name	Type	Location	Assyrian population	Ref
Fairfield	suburb	Australia, NSW	15.5%	
Prairewood	suburb	Australia, NSW	14.9%	
Fairfield Heights	suburb	Australia, NSW	28.9%	
Greenfield Park	suburb	Australia, NSW	34.6%	
Roxburgh park	suburb	Australia, Victoria	18.5%	
Coolaroo	suburb	Australia, Victoria	7.6%	
Sterling Heights	city	United States, Michigan	20.70%	
Chaldean Town	neighbourhood	United States, Michigan	Minority	
Orchard Lake Village	city	United States, Michigan	10.9%	
West Bloomfield	township	United States, Michigan	7.5%	

== See also ==
- Assyrian diaspora
- Sayfo
