= Hnaberd =

Hnaberd or Gnaberd or Khnaberd may refer to:

- Hnaberd, Aragatsotn, Armenia
- Hnaberd, Ararat, Armenia
