= Gulshan Pashayeva =

Azerbaijani politician and analyst

Gulshan Pashayeva Gülşən Paşayeva MP
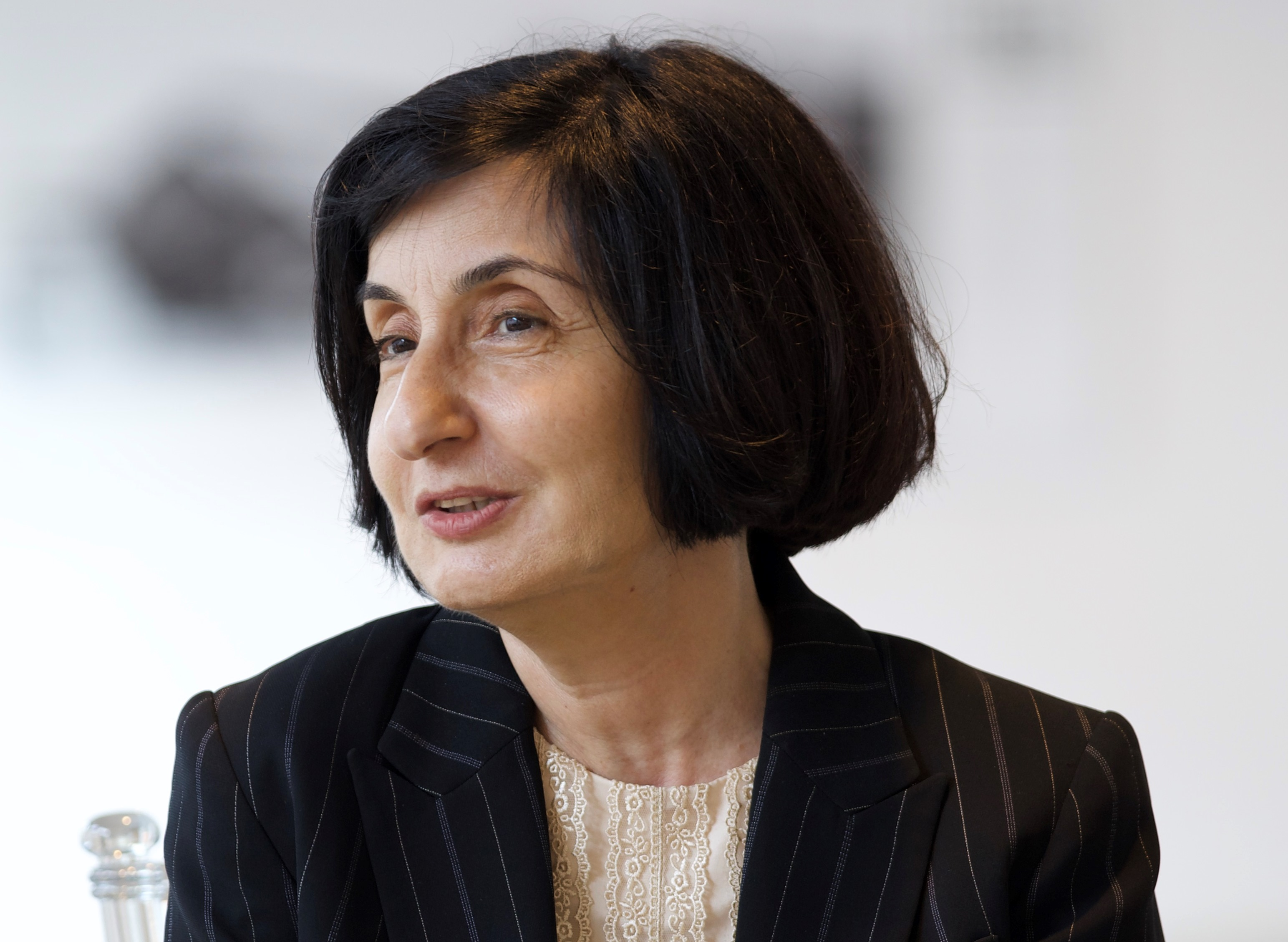

Member of the National Assembly
- Incumbent
- Assumed office 23 September 2024
- Constituency: Second Khazar Constituency No.13

Personal details
- Born: 1 August 1961 (age 65) Baku, Azerbaijan SSR, USSR
- Party: Independent
- Education: M. V. Lomonosov Moscow State University
- Occupation: Political analyst, politician, linguist

Gulshan Mammadali gizi Pashayeva (Azerbaijani: Gülşən Məmmədəli qızı Paşayeva; born 1 August 1961) is an Azerbaijani linguist, political analyst, and politician who has served as a member of the 7th convocation of the National Assembly of the Republic of Azerbaijan and as deputy chair of the board of the Center for Analysis of International Relations and Multiculturalism.

== Biography ==
Gulshan Pashayeva was born into the family of historian Mammadali Pashayev. She graduated with a gold medal from Secondary School No. 159 in Baku in 1978 and earned a degree in Structural and Applied Linguistics from Lomonosov Moscow State University in 1983.

In 1996, she founded the Research Center for Conflictology Problems and led the center until 2001. From 2001 to 2006, she served as the National Coordinator for Azerbaijan in the UN Women's "Women in Conflict Prevention and Peacebuilding in the South Caucasus" regional project. Between 2007 and 2009, she worked at the UN Department of Public Information in Azerbaijan.

In 2009, Gulshan Pashayeva became head of the Foreign Policy Analysis Department at the Center for Strategic Studies and was appointed its deputy director in 2011. In 2018, she joined the Presidential Administration of Azerbaijan as a chief adviser. By decrees of the President of Azerbaijan, Gulshan Pashayeva was appointed a board member of the Center of Analysis of International Relations on 9 December 2019 and deputy chair of the board of the Center for Analysis of International Relations and Multiculturalism on 11 September 2026.

Gulshan Pashayeva was elected to the National Assembly of Azerbaijan in 2024, representing the 13th Khazar Second Constituency. She is a member of the Defence, Security and Counter-Corruption Committee, the Committee on Foreign and Interparliamentary Relations, the Temporary Commission against Foreign Interference and Hybrid Threats, and the OSCE Parliamentary Assembly. She also serves as the leader of the Working Group on Azerbaijan–Laos Inter-Parliamentary Relations.

She was awarded the Progress Medal in 2017 and the 25th Anniversary Medal of Mine Action Agency in 2023.

=== Academic activity ===
From 1983 to 2001, Gulshan Pashayeva worked at Baku State University in roles ranging from lecturer to associate professor. She holds a PhD in Philology, awarded in 1990.

She specializes in conflict resolution, security, gender studies, and language policy. She has taken part and conducted research in international programs on conflict resolution and negotiation, including the "Partners in Conflict" program at the University of Maryland in 1995 and a Fulbright Scholarship at Fletcher School at Tufts University in 1998–1999. She also attended mediation training at the Austrian Study Center for Peace and Conflict Resolution in 2000, and a conflict resolution program at Uppsala University in 2001.

Gulshan Pashayeva has authored over 130 articles and co-edited three books, including The EU Eastern Partnership: Common Framework or Wider Opportunity? (2012), Cooperation in Eurasia: Linking Identity, Security, and Development (2016), and Trapped Between War and Peace: The Case of Karabakh (2017).
