= Dvin (ancient city) =

Capital of early medieval Armenia

- Դվին (Armenian)
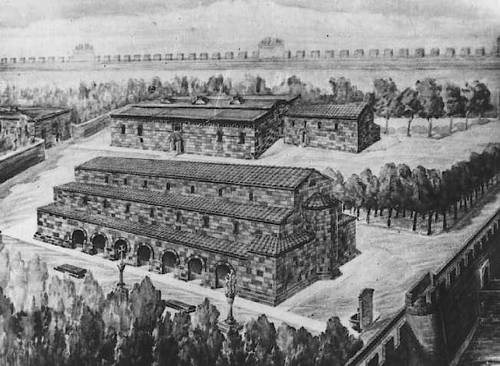
- Drawing of the central square of the ancient Armenian capital city of Dvin. The main cathedral of St. Grigor (4th–5th century), with a small church of St. Sarkis to the right (6th century), and the residence of the Catholicos on the left (5th century).

- Location within Armenia Location within Ararat
- 40°0′16″N 44°34′42″E
- Location: Southwest of the Dvin village; between Hnaberd and Verin Dvin, Ararat Province, Armenia

History
- Built: 4th century
- Built by: King Khosrov III
- Abandoned: 1236

Dvin (Classical Armenian: Դուին Duin or Դվին Dvin; Greek: Δούβιος, Doúbios or Τίβιον, Tíbion; Arabic: دبيل, Dabīl or Doubil) was a large commercial city and the capital of early medieval Armenia. It was situated north of the previous ancient capital of Armenia, the city of Artaxata, along the banks of the Metsamor River, 35 kilometres (22 mi) to the south of modern Yerevan. It is claimed it was one of the largest cities east of Constantinople prior to its destruction by the Mongols in the 13th century, but with an overall area of approximately 1 km^{2}, it was far smaller than many of the great cities of Asia. It had an estimated population of 45,000 in 361, 47,000 in 622, and around 100,000 at its height in the 8th-9th centuries. Nyura Hakobyan proposed a peak population of 100,000 to 150,000.

The site of the ancient city is currently not much more than a large hill located between modern Hnaberd (just off the main road through Hnaberd) and Verin Dvin, Armenia. Excavations at Dvin since 1937 have produced an abundance of materials, which have shed light on the Armenian culture of the 5th to the 13th centuries.

== Name ==
The earliest Armenian authors almost always give the name of the city as Duin (Դուին), while later authors such as Samuel of Ani spell it Dvin (Դվին), which is the form commonly used in scholarly literature. (Note: In reformed Armenian orthography, both forms are rendered Դվին Dvin.) The early medieval Armenian historian Movses Khorenatsi explains the name of Dvin as coming from a (Middle) Persian word (*duwīn) meaning 'hill'. In the 5th-century Armenian history attributed to Faustus of Byzantium, the site is called "the hill [blur] in the plain of the Mecamōr called Duin" without reference to the meaning of the name. According to Erich Kettenhofen, Khorenatsi's explanation of the name resulted from an incorrect interpretation of the aforementioned passage in Faustus's history. Marie-Louise Chaumont writes that Khorenatsi's etymology became more accepted after Vladimir Minorsky pointed out the use of the word dovīn to mean 'hill' in Persian place names.

== History ==
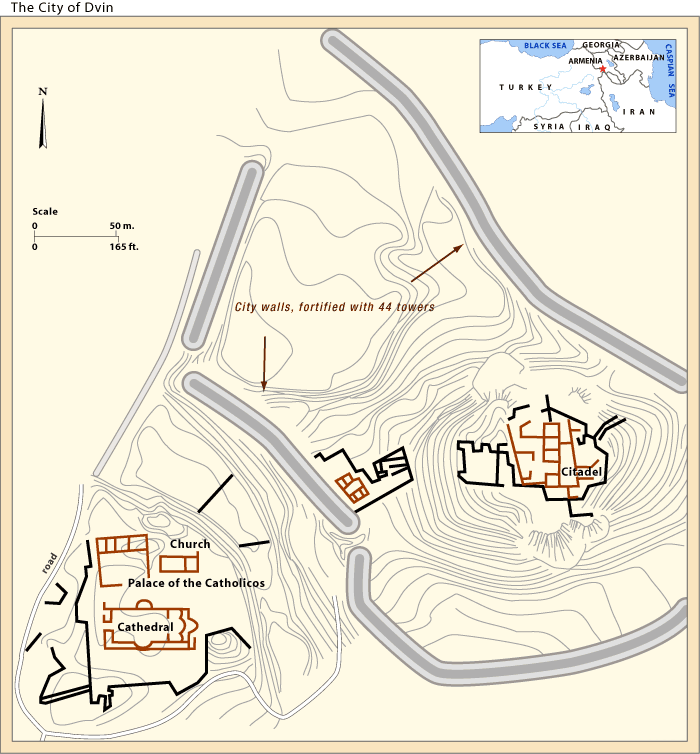
Map of Dvin

The ancient city of Dvin was built by Khosrov III Kotak in 335 on a site of an ancient settlement and fortress from the 3rd millennium BC. Since then, the city had been used as the primary residence of the Armenian Kings of the Arsacid dynasty. Dvin boasted a population of about 100,000 citizens in various professions, including arts and crafts, trade, fishing, etc.

After the fall of the Armenian Kingdom in 428, Dvin became the residence of Sassanid appointed marzpans (governors), Byzantine kouropalates and later Umayyad- and Abbasid-appointed ostikans (governors). Under Arsacid rule, Dvin prospered as one of the most populous and wealthiest cities east of Constantinople. Its prosperity continued even after the partition of Armenia between Romans and Sasanids, when it became the provincial capital of Persian Armenia, and eventually it became a target during the height of the Early Muslim conquests. The palace at Dvin contained a Zoroastrian fire-temple. According to Sebeos and Catholicos John V the Historian, Dvin was captured by the Arabs in 640 during the reign of Constans II and Catholicos Ezra. During the Arab conquest of Armenia, Dvin was captured and pillaged in 640, in the first raids. On January 6, 642 the Arabs stormed and took the city, with many deaths. Dvin became the center of the Muslim province of Arminiya, the Arabs called the city Dabil.

Although Armenia was a battleground between Arabs and Byzantine forces for the next two centuries, in the 9th century it still flourished. Frequent earthquakes and continued warfare led to the decline of the city from the beginning of the 10th century. During a major earthquake in 893, the city was destroyed, along with most of its 70,000 inhabitants.

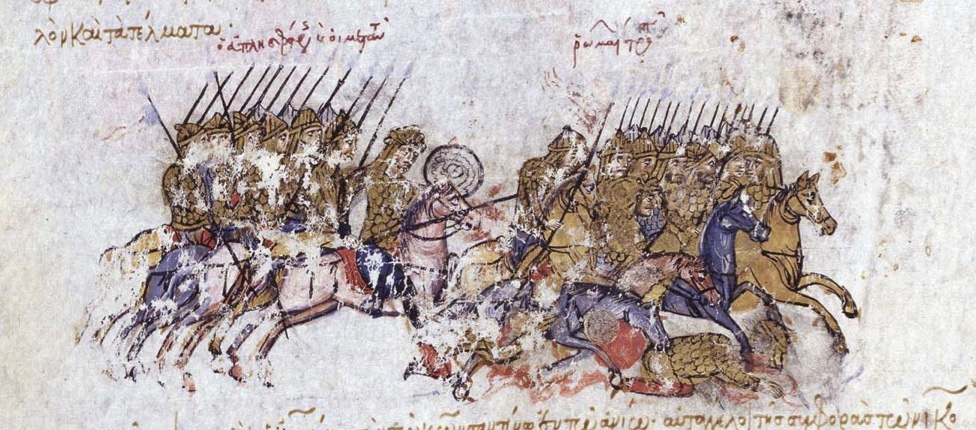
The defeat of the Byzantines at Dvin, miniature from the Madrid Skylitzes

Following a devastating Buyid raid in 1021, which sacked the city, Dvin was captured by the Kurdish Shaddadids of Ganja, and ruled by Abu'l-Aswar Shavur ibn Fadl, who successfully defended it against three Byzantine attacks in the latter half of the 1040s. In 1046, Byzantine forces under Constantine IX Monomachos attacked Dvin. The Byzantines assembled a large force under the command of Michael Iasites and Constantine the Alan and allied with the Armenians under the command of Vahram Pahlavuni and Liparit Orbelean. To defend the city, the Shaddadid ruler Abu'l-Aswar flooded the surrounding fields, limiting the attacking army's mobility and causing it to fall victim to defenders' arrows. The attackers were completely broken by the Kurds, and Vahram was killed.

In 1064, the Seljuk Turks occupied the city. The Shaddadids continued to rule the city as Seljuk vassals until the Georgian King George III conquered the city in 1173. In 1201–1203, during the reign of Queen Tamar, the city was again under Georgian rule. It was captured by Jalal al-Din Mangburni in 1225. Rule of Khwarezmian Empire lasted till Battle of Yassıçemen in 1230. After the battle, Georgians regained it. In 1236, the city was conquered and completely destroyed by Mongols.

Dvin was the birthplace of Najm ad-Din Ayyub and Asad ad-Din Shirkuh bin Shadhi, Kurdish generals in the service of the Seljuk Zengids; Najm ad-Din Ayyub's son, Saladin, was the founder of the Ayyubid dynasty. Saladin was born in Tikrit, Modern Iraq, but his family had originated from the ancient city of Dvin.

== Cathedral of St. Grigor ==
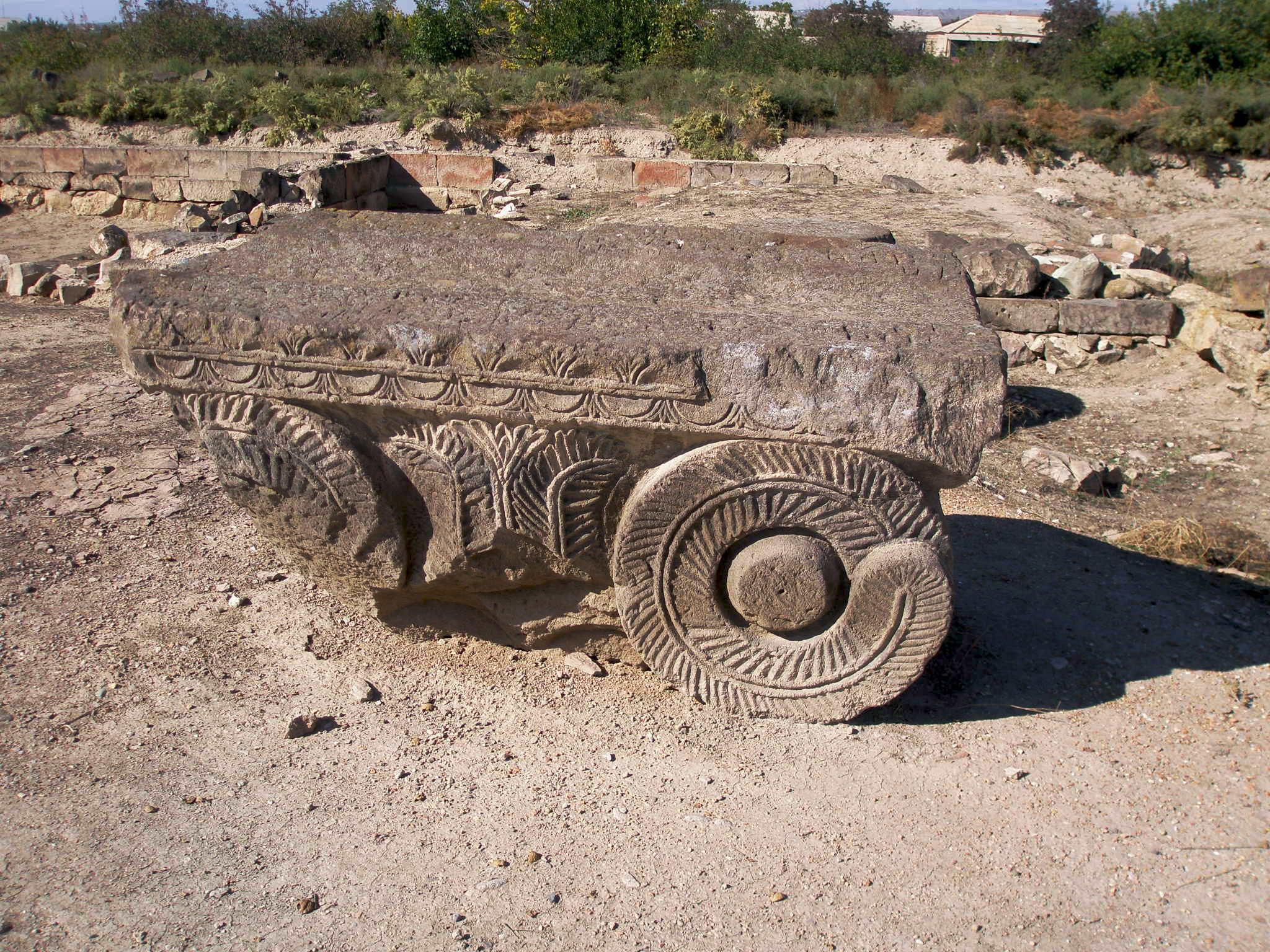
Capital of Saint Gregory Cathedral of Dvin

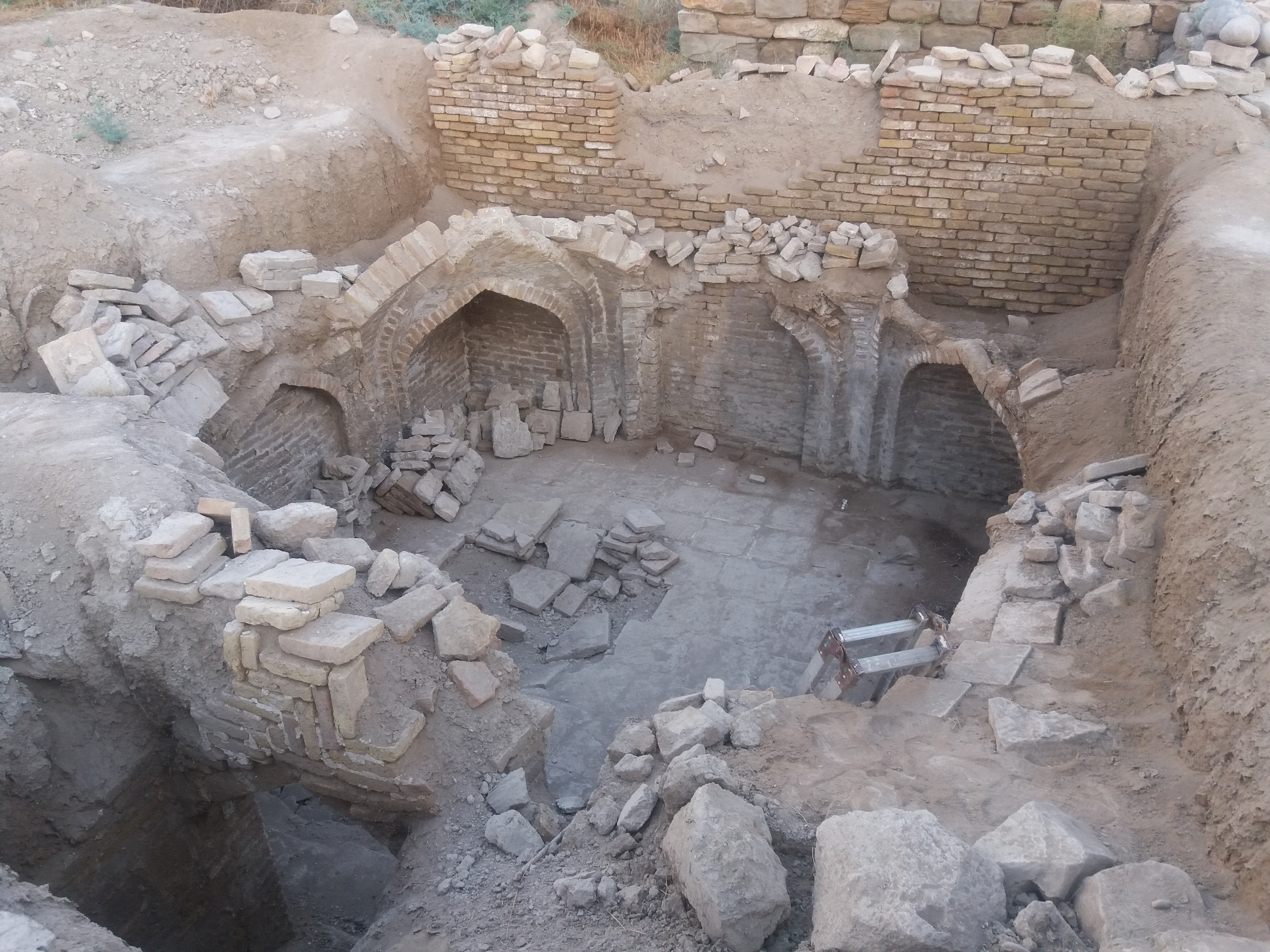

Situated in the central square of the ancient city was the Cathedral of Saint Grigor which may be on the site of originally constructed triple-nave pagan temple with seven pairs of interior structural supports. In the 5th century (ca. 450–485) it was rebuilt as a Christian church, with a pentahedral apse that protruded sharply on its eastern side. In the late 5th or early 6th century there was a second phase of construction: an exterior arched gallery was added to the existing structure. At the time that the cathedral was built, it was the largest in Armenia and measured 30.41 meters by 58.17 meters.

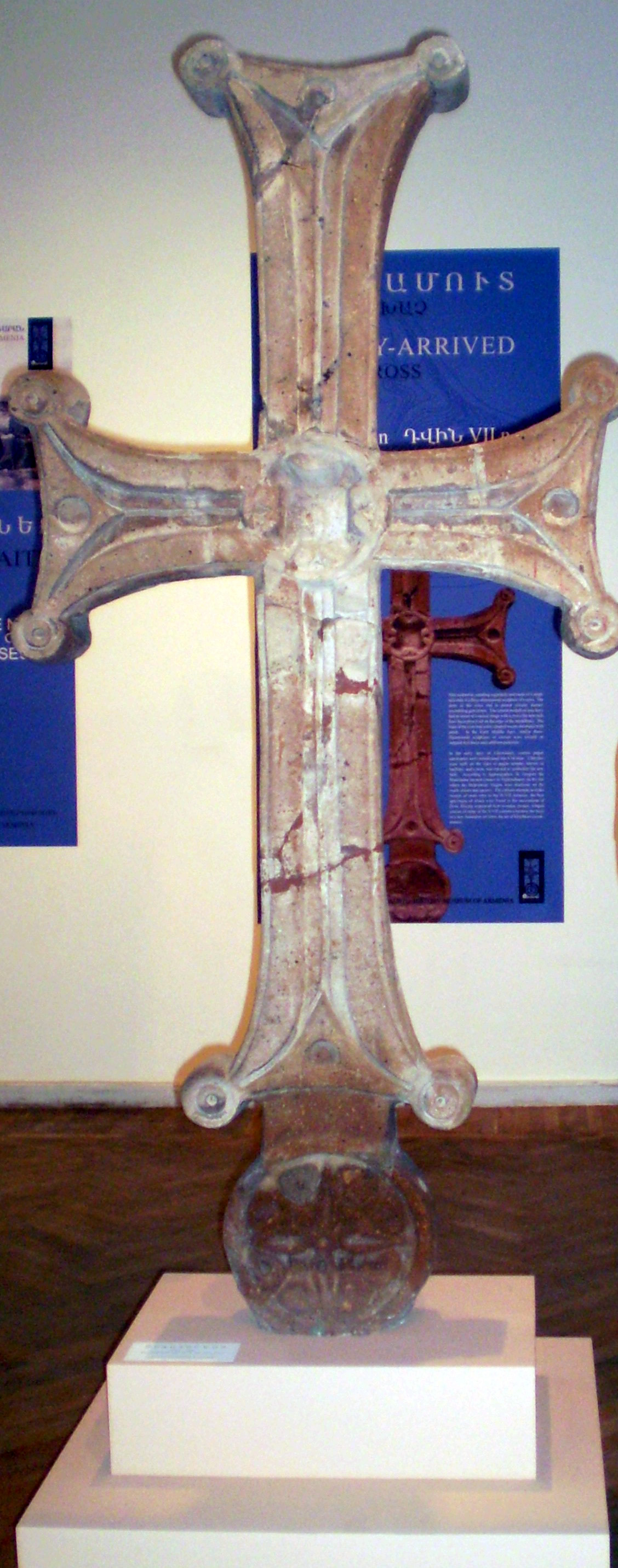
A 2-meter long Armenian cross excavated from the site of Dvin

Ornate decorations adorned the interior and the exterior of the building. The capitals of the columns were decorated with fern-like relief, while the cornices were carved in the design of three interlaced strands. The interior floor of the structure was made up of mosaic multi-colored soft-toned slabs in a geometric pattern, while the floor of the apse was decorated in the 7th century with a mosaic of smaller stone tiles representing the Holy Virgin. It is the most ancient mosaic depiction of her in Armenia. By the middle of the 7th century, the cathedral was rebuilt into a cruciform domed church with apses that protruded off of its lateral facades. All that remains of the cathedral today are the stone foundations uncovered during archaeological excavations in the 20th century.

== Gallery ==
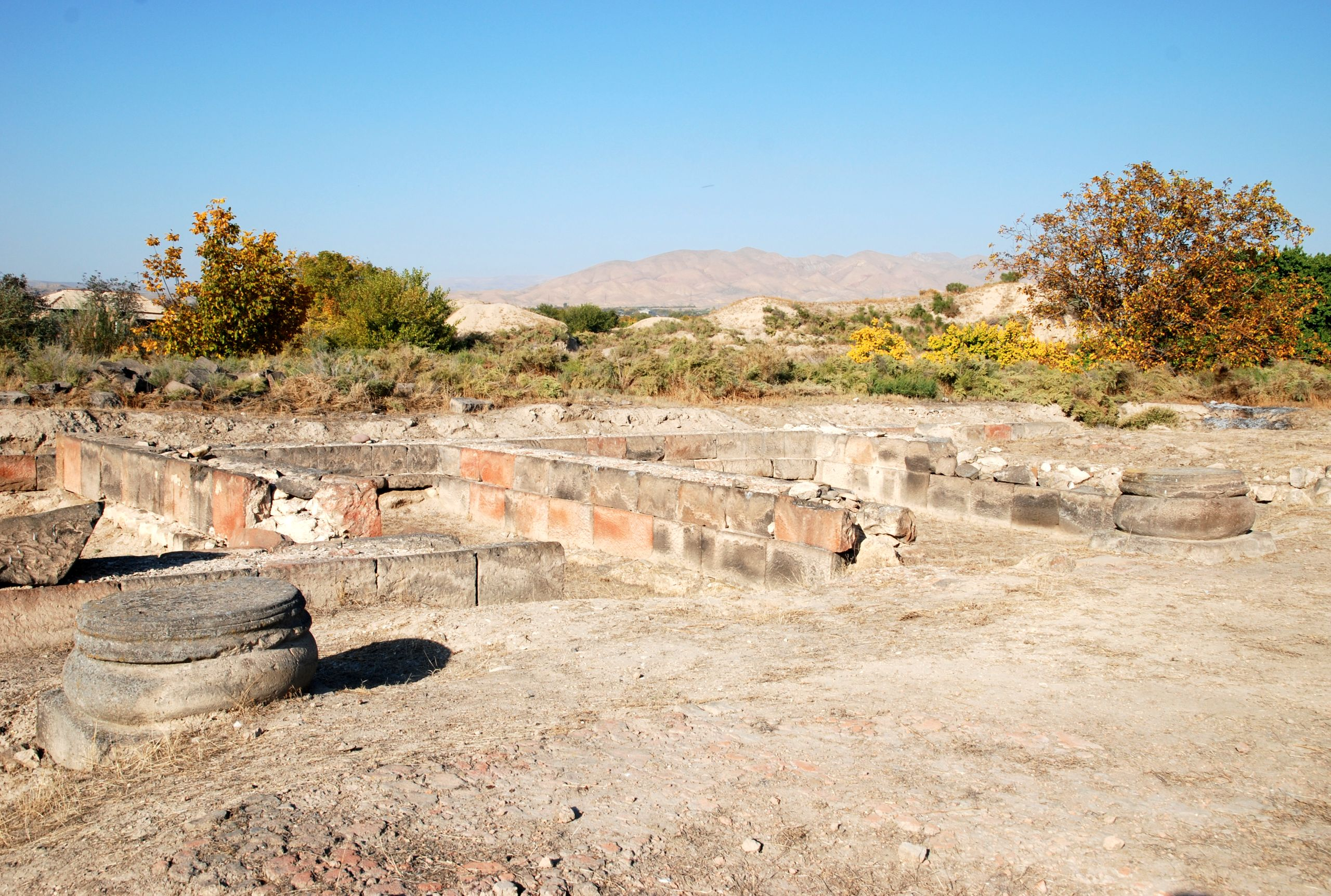

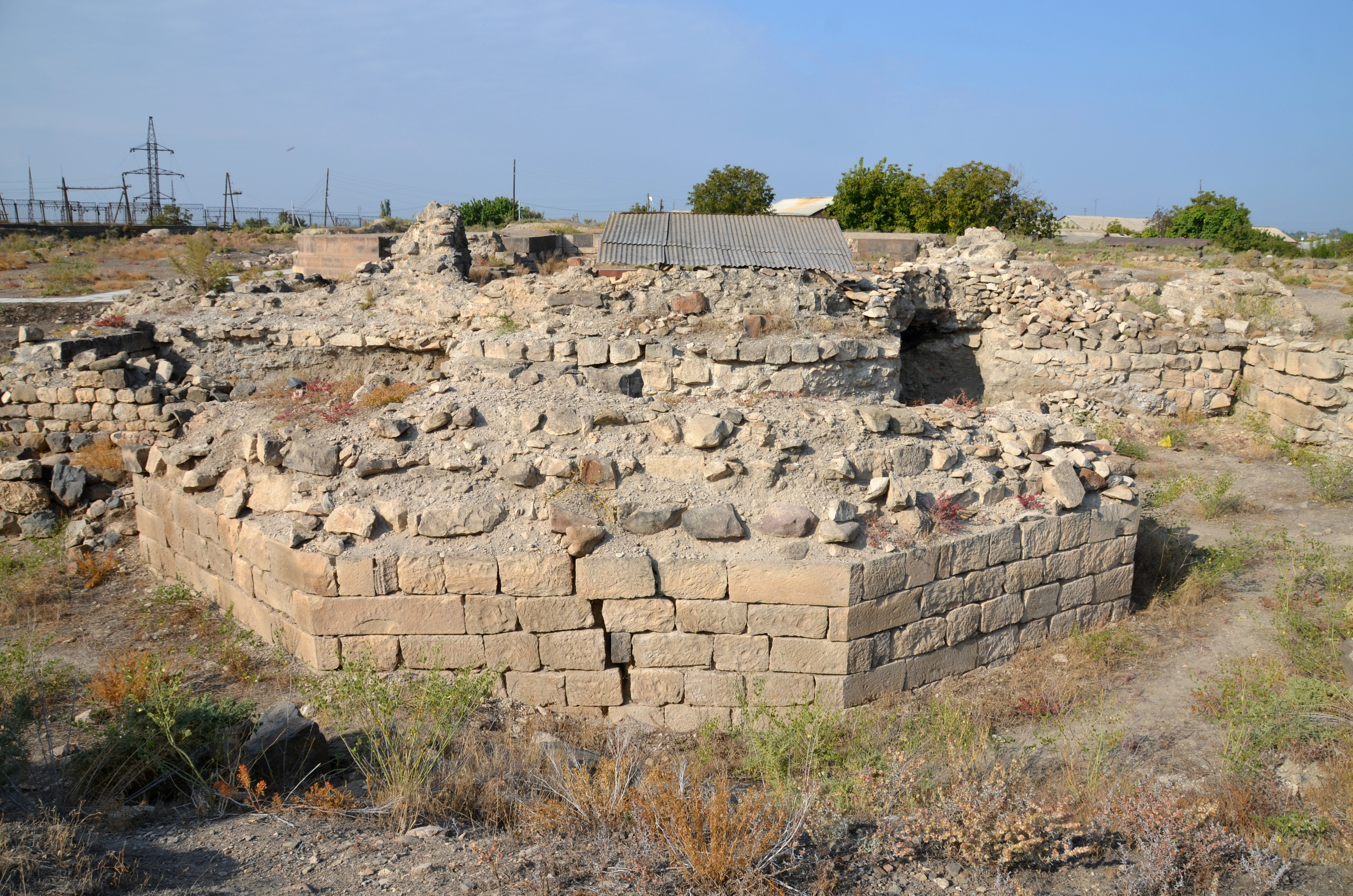

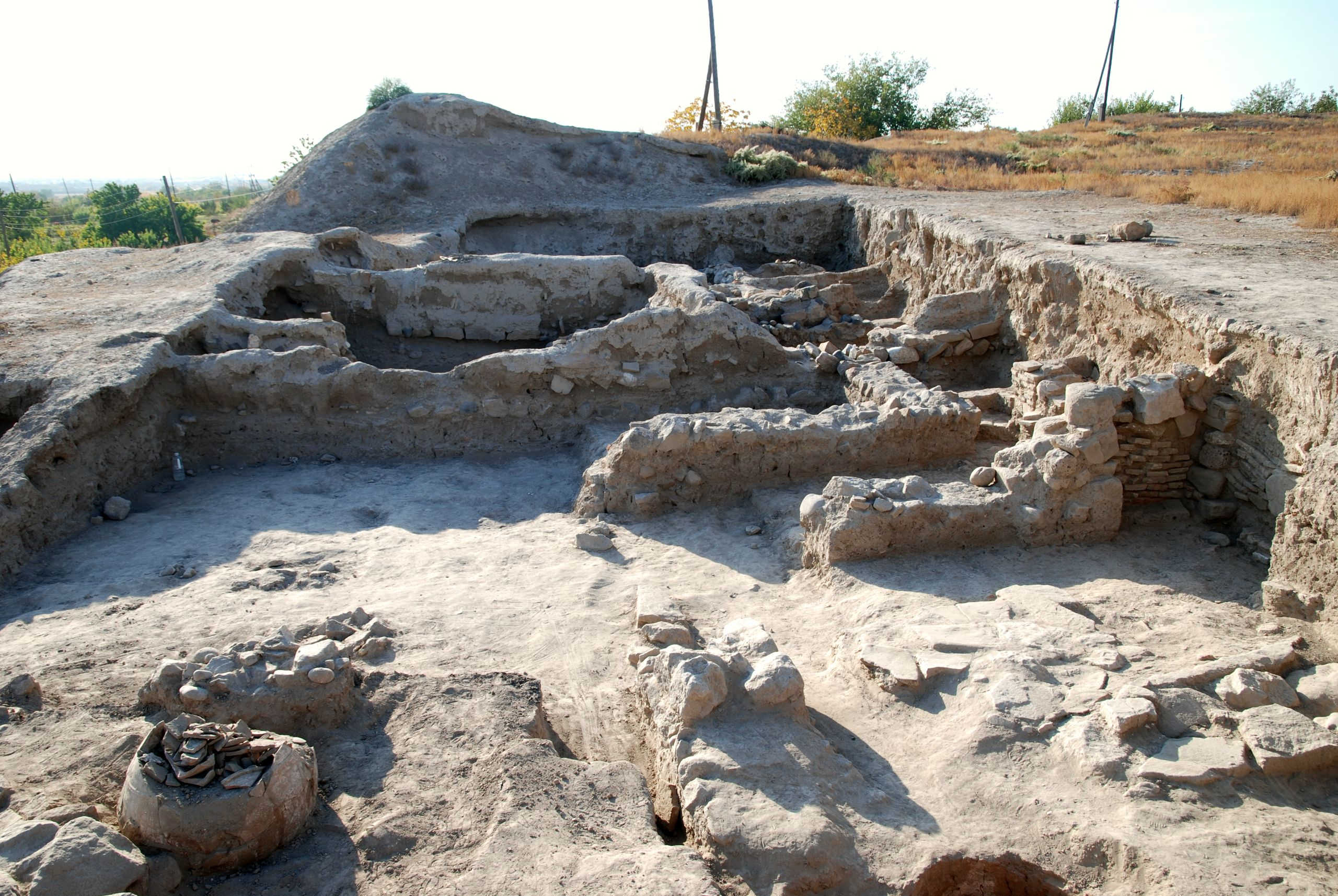

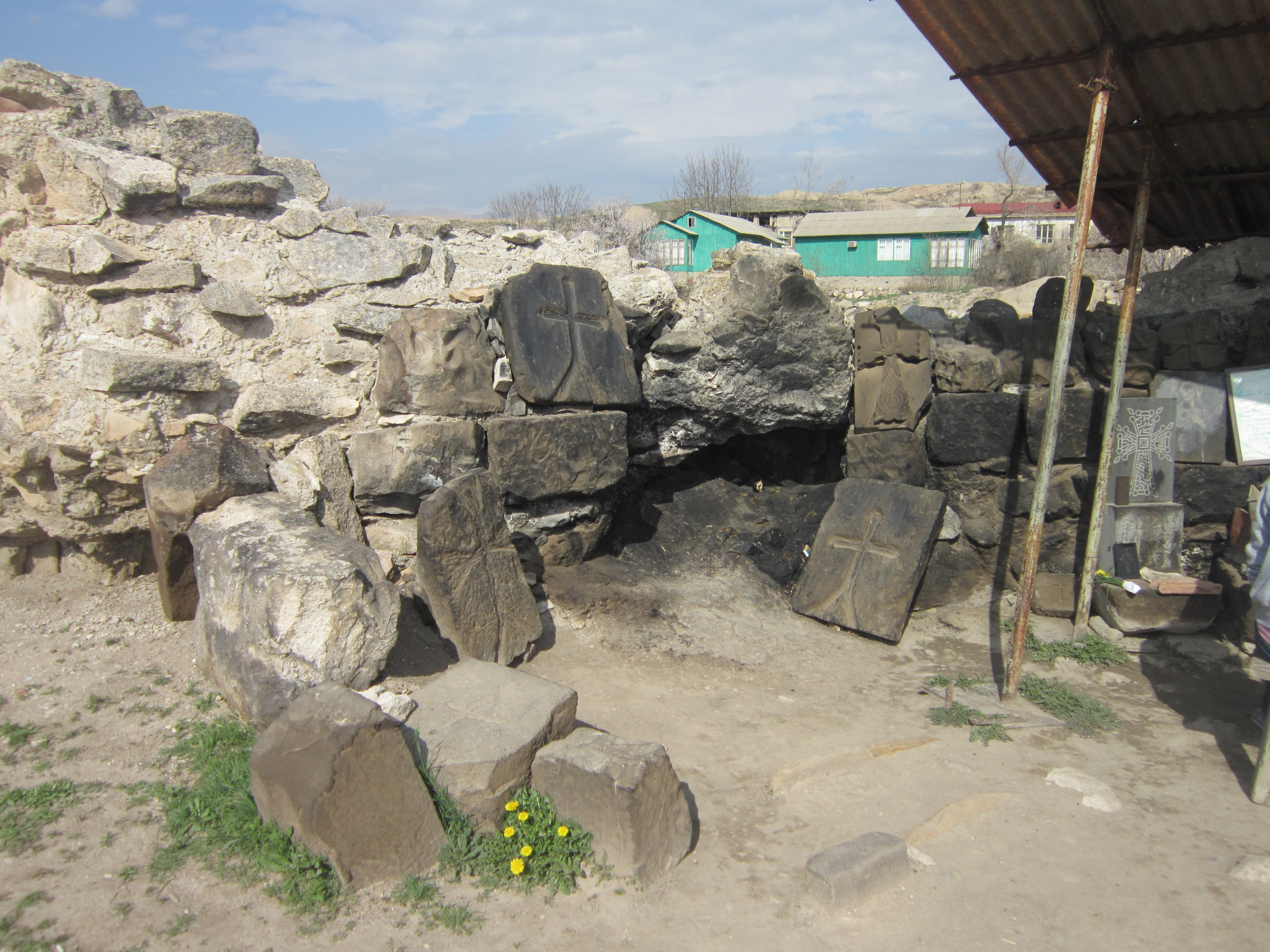

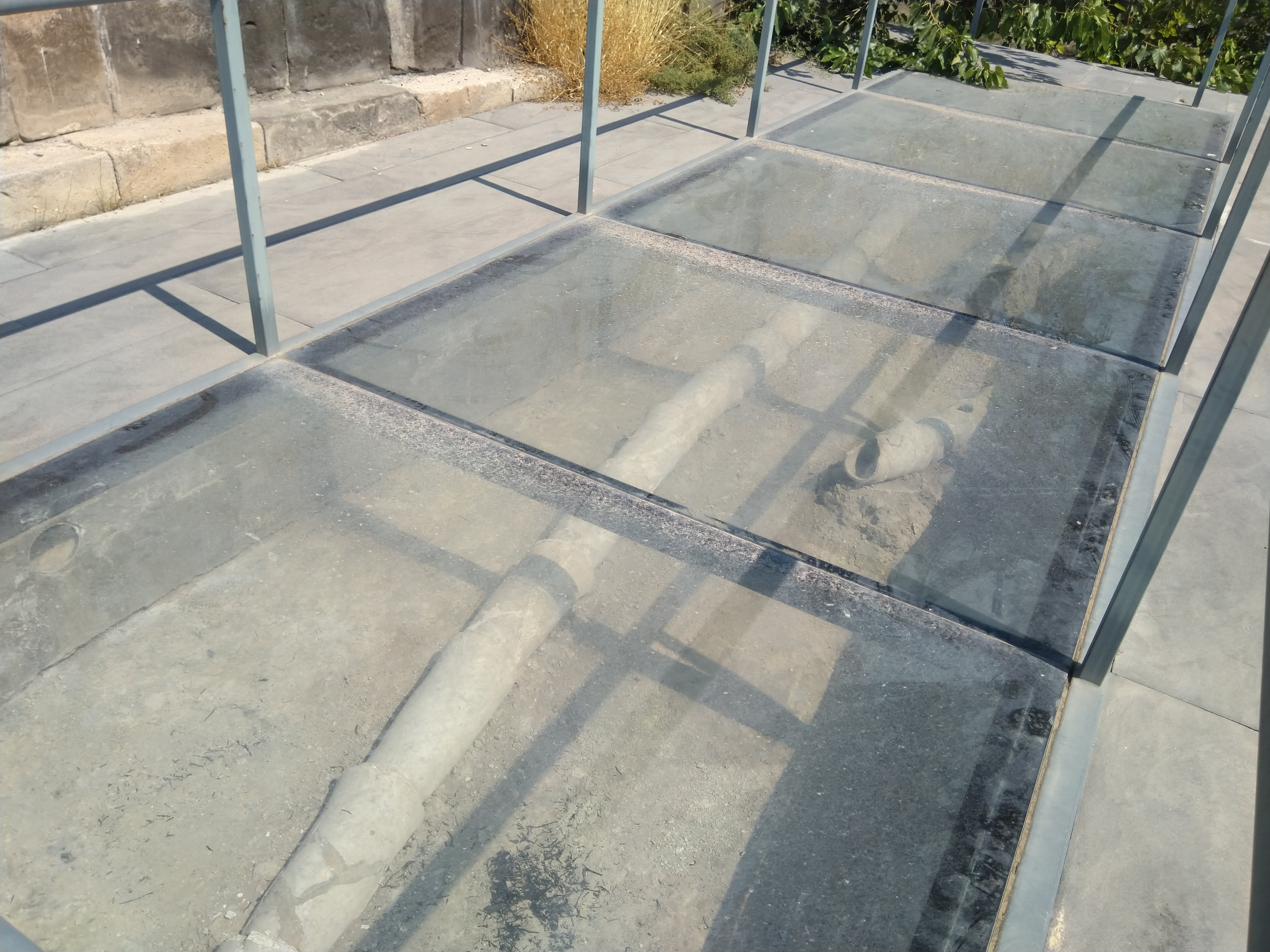

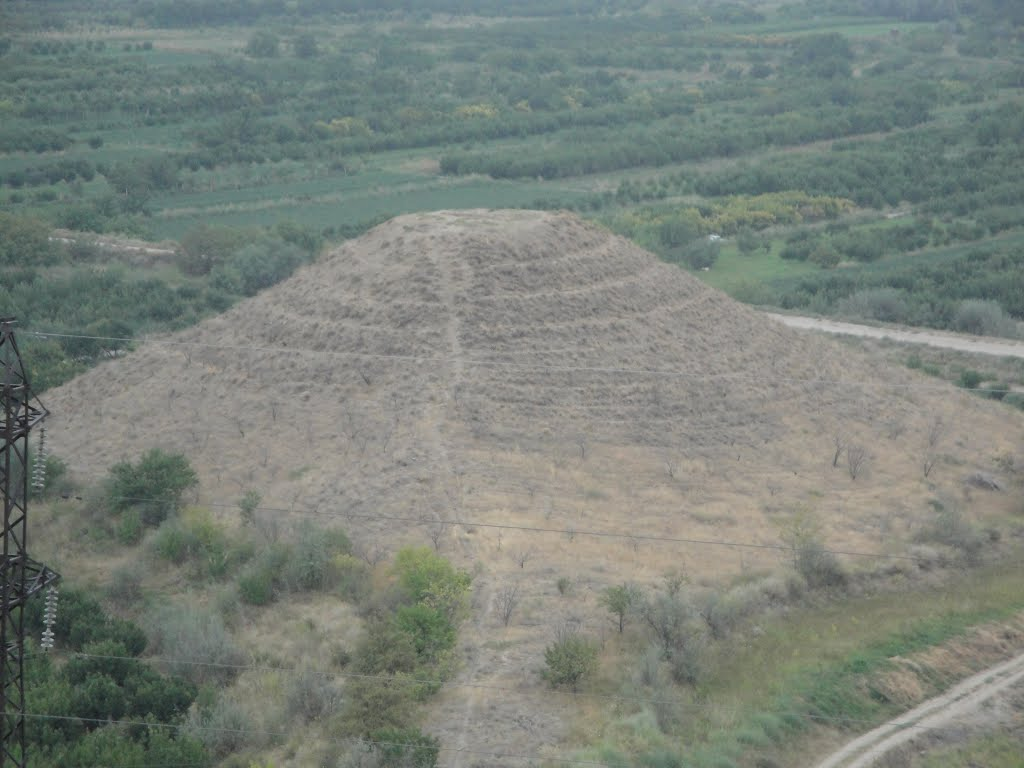

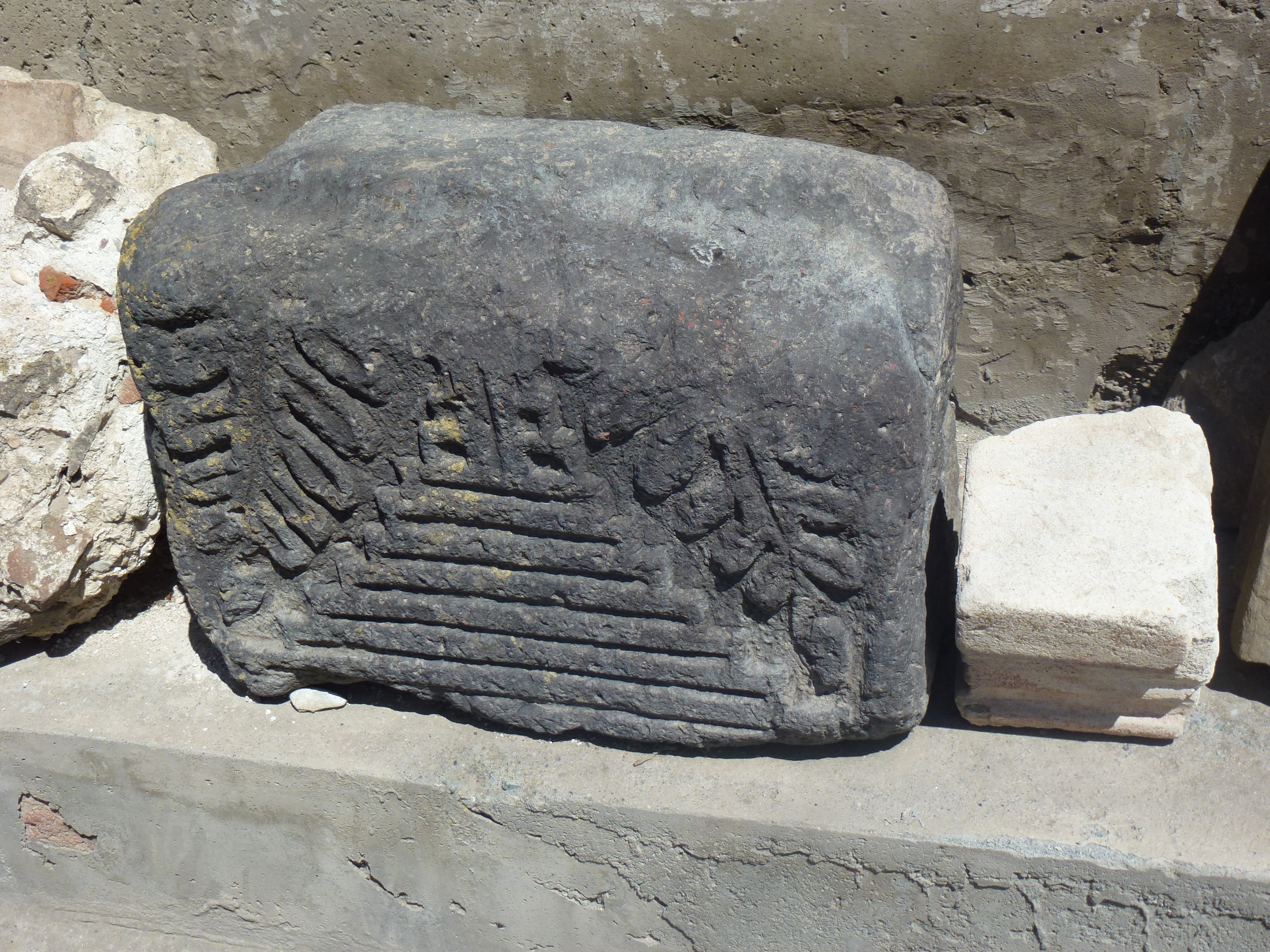

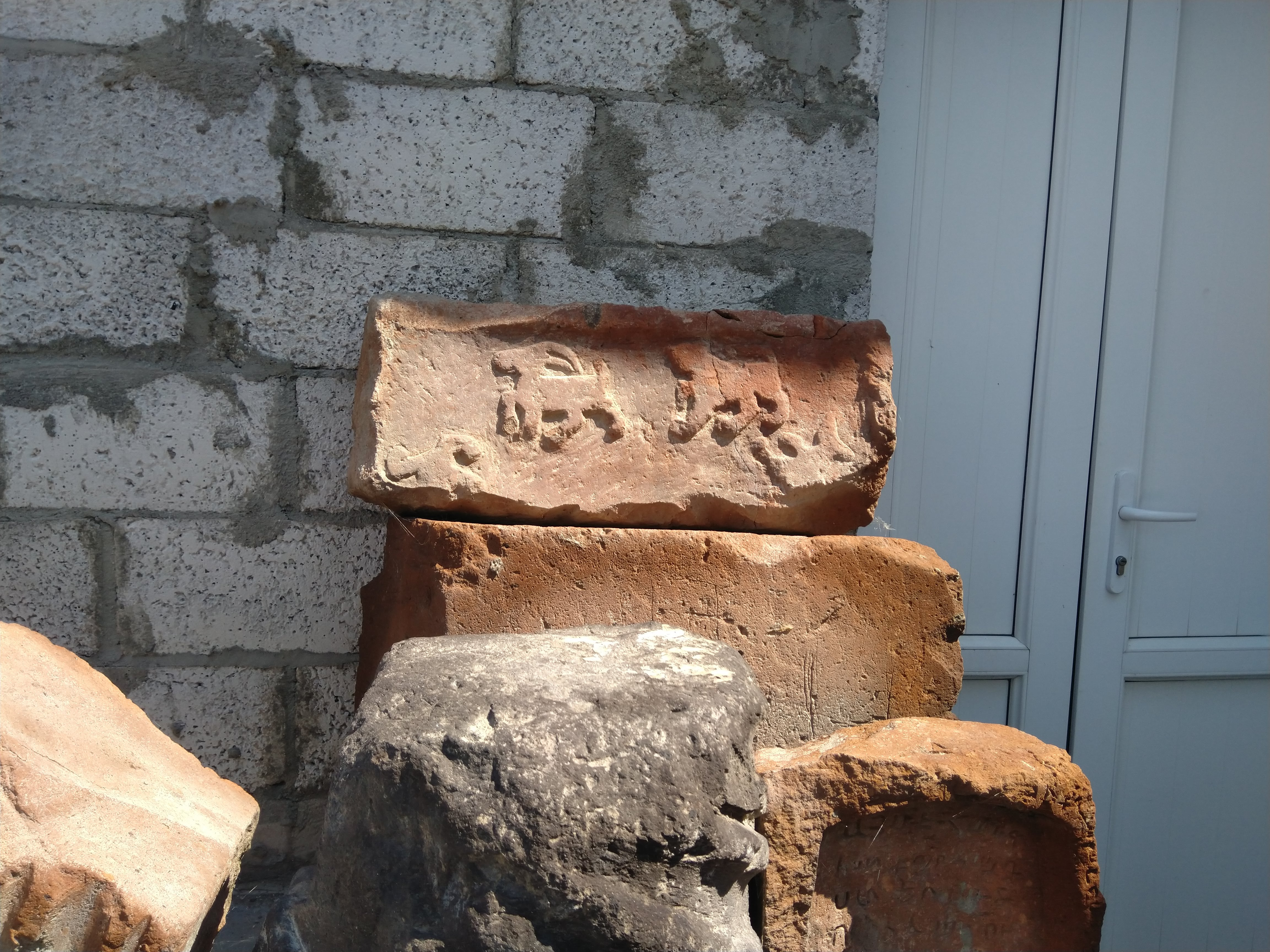

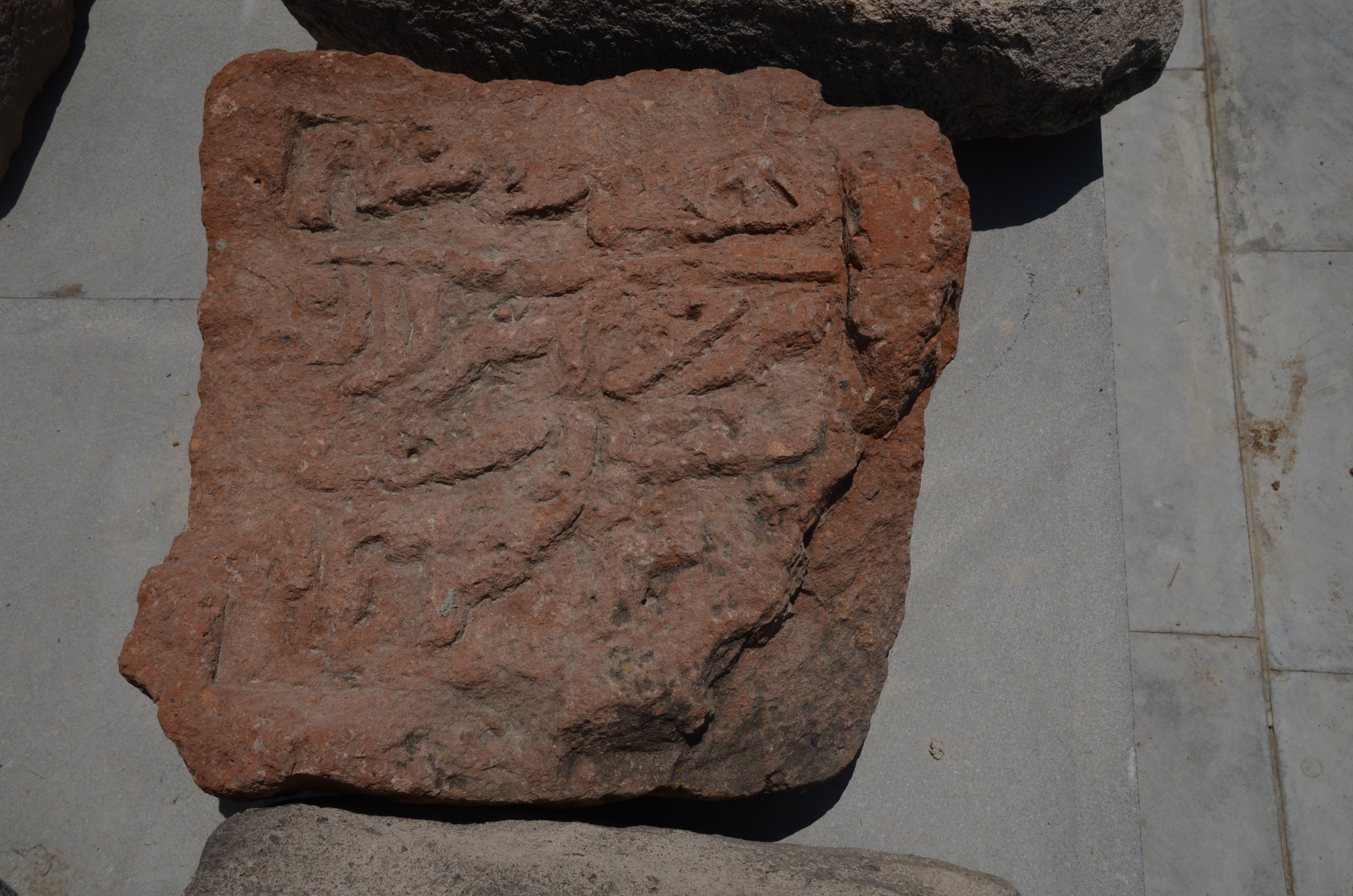

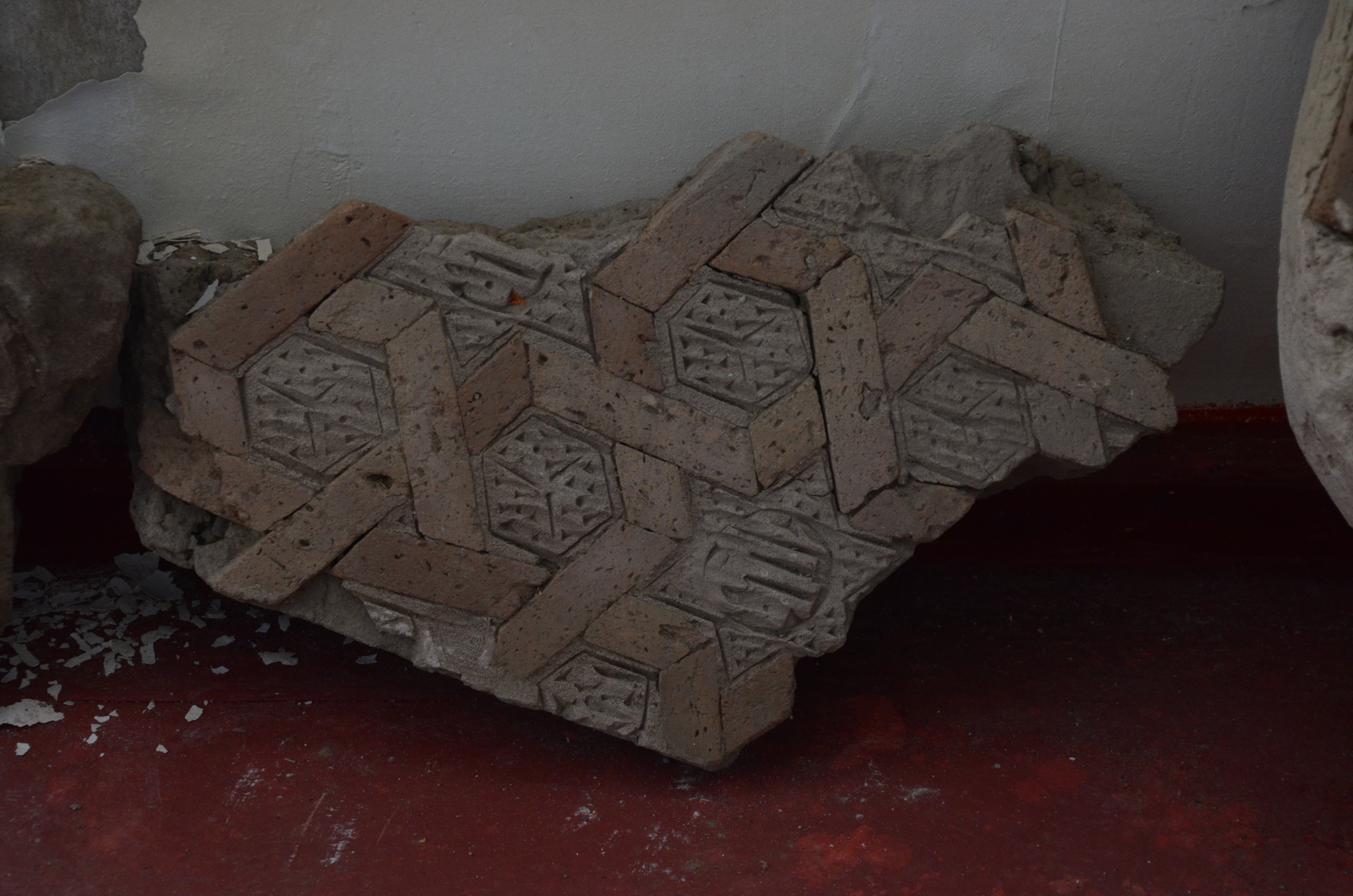

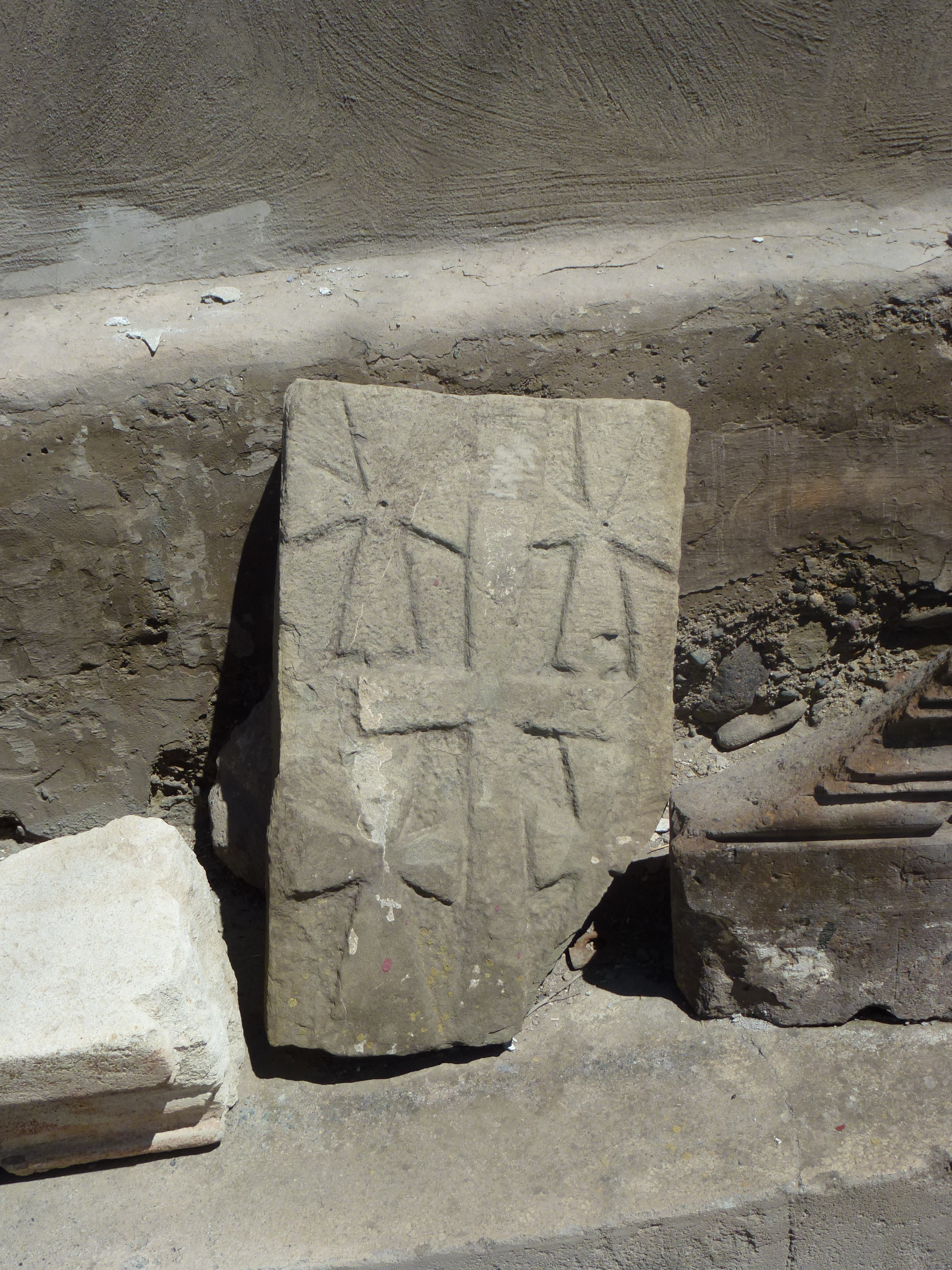

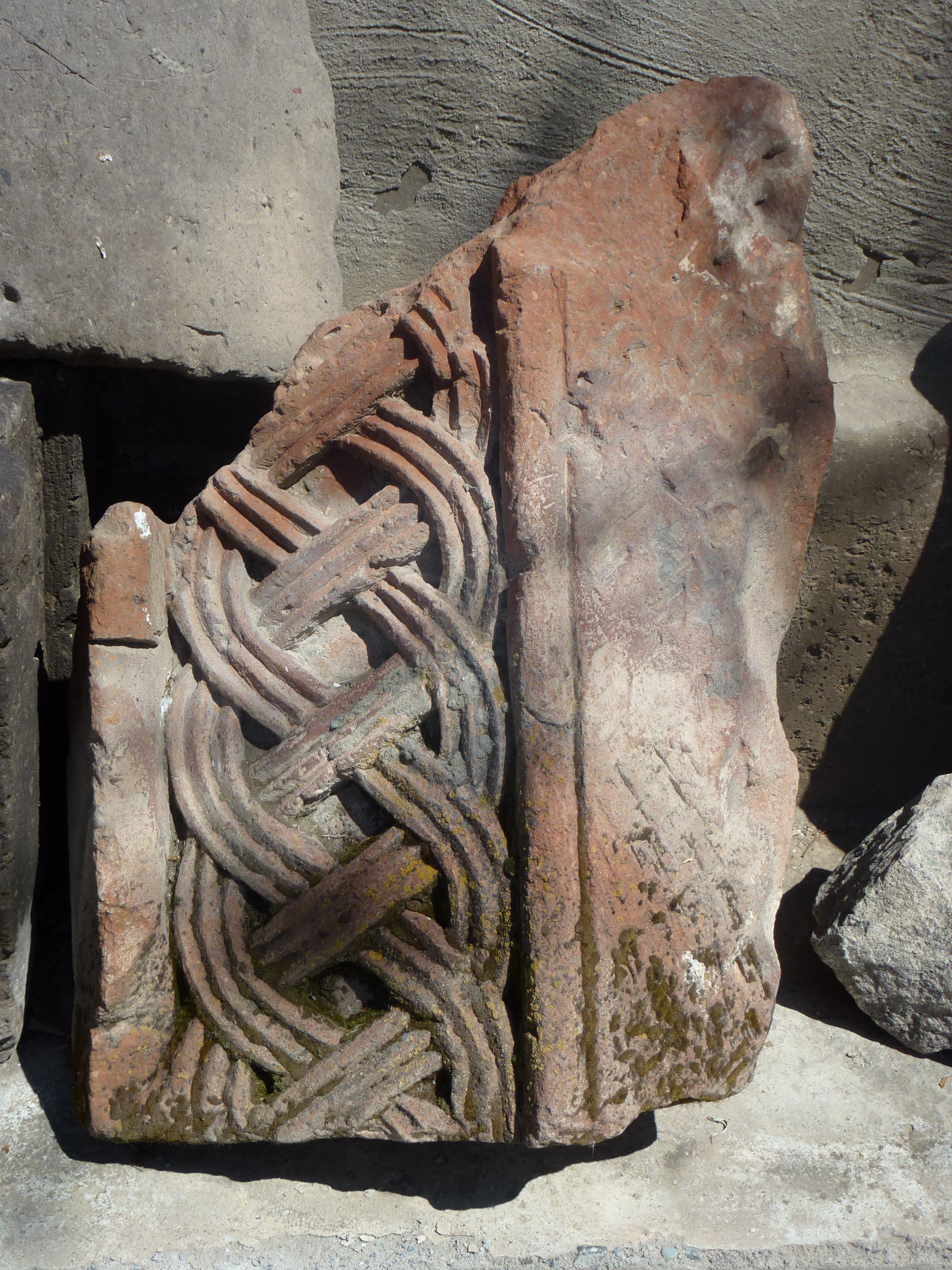

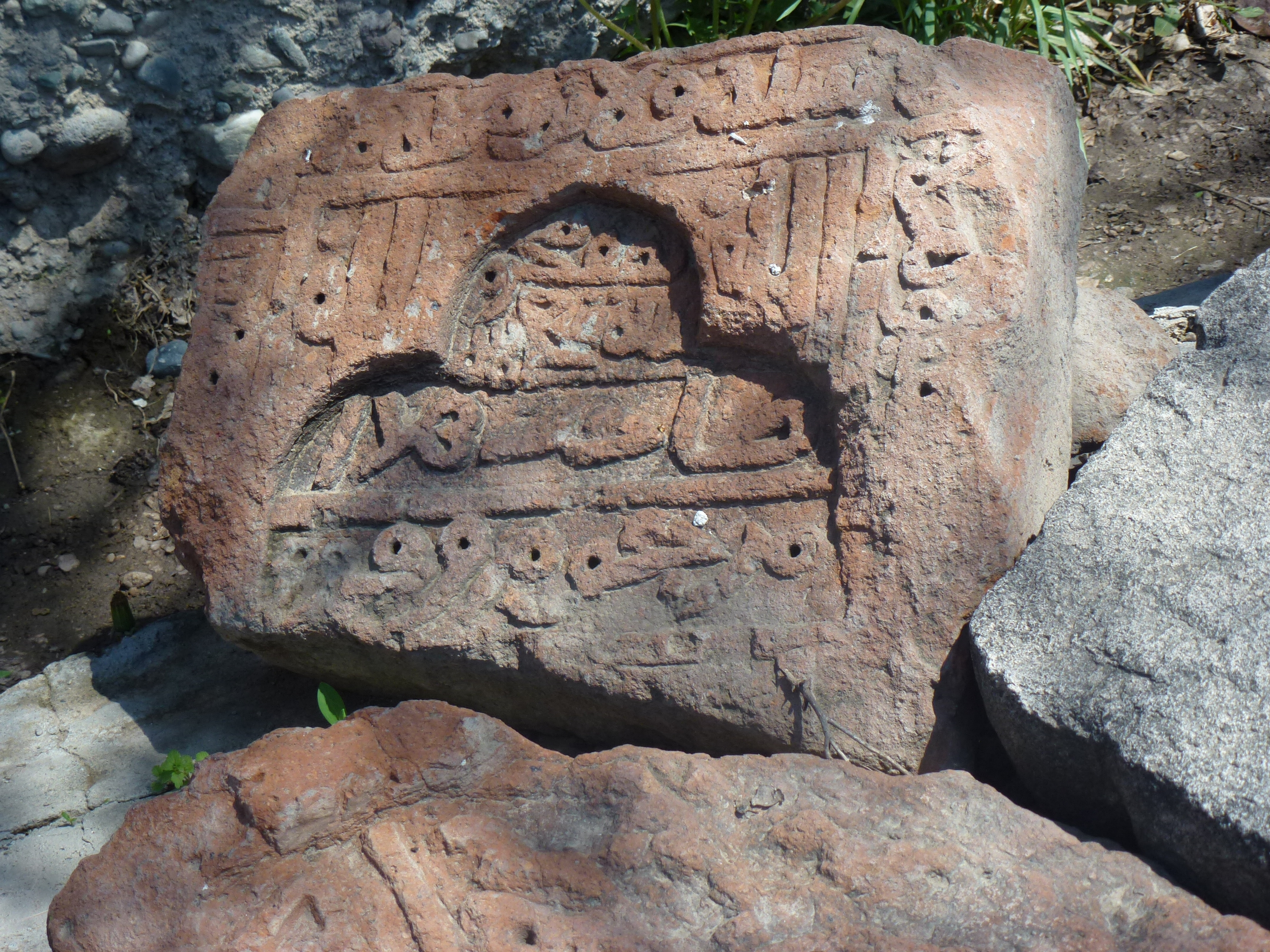

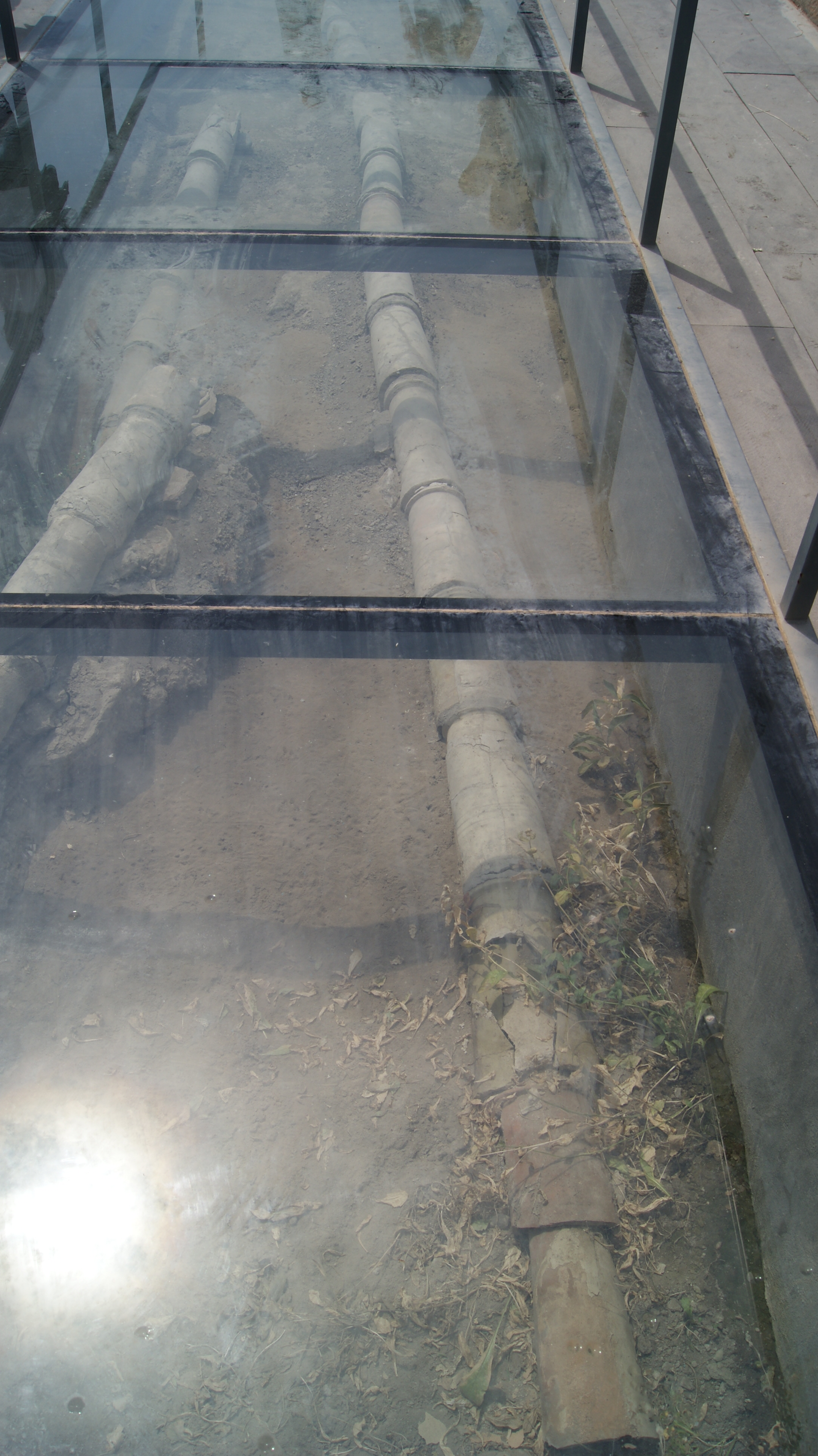

== See also ==
- Zacharias I of Armenia
