= Assyrians in Georgia =

Ethnic group in Georgia

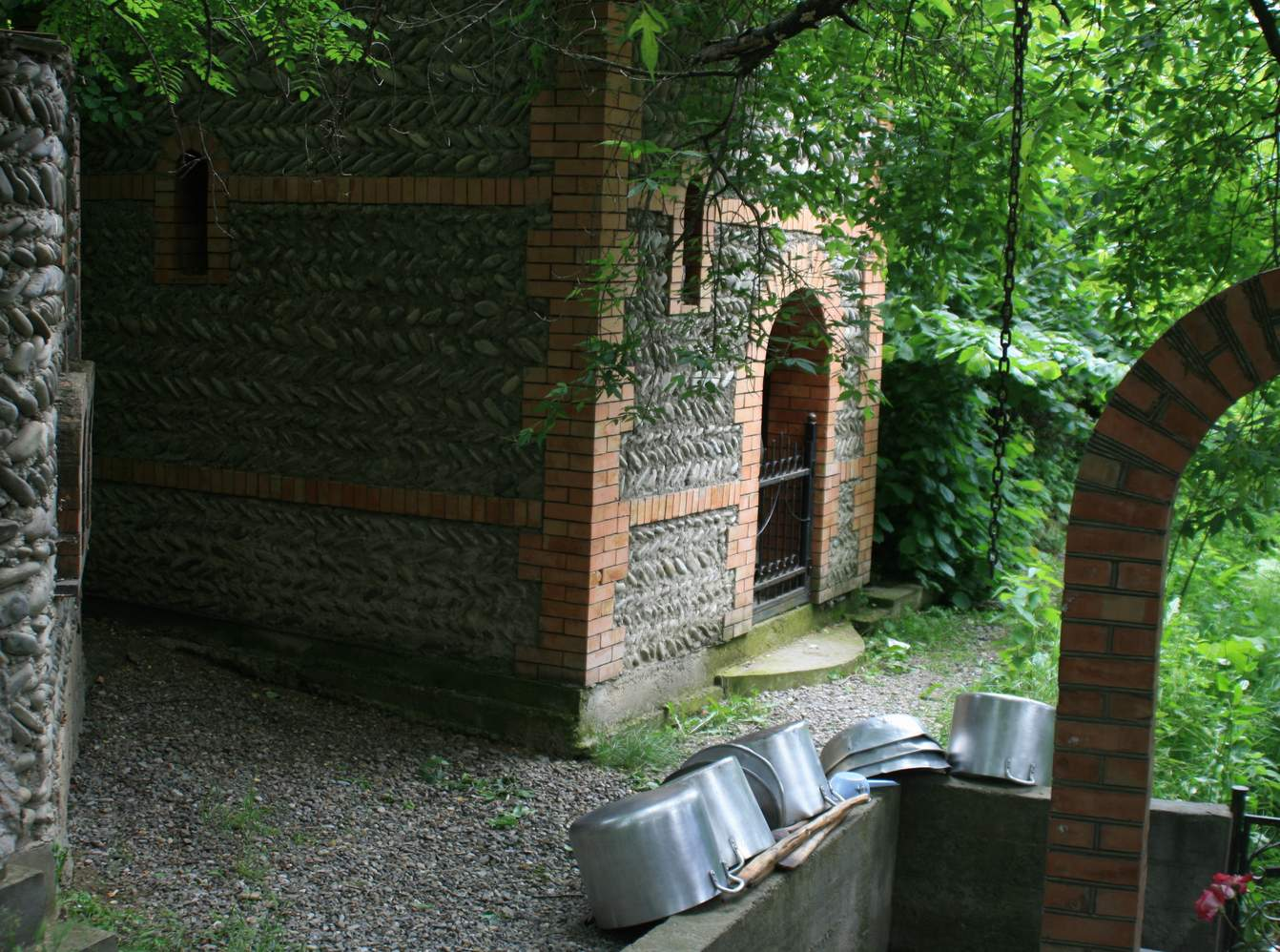
- Assyrian church in Dzveli Kanda village

Total population
- 2,377

Regions with significant populations

Languages
- Georgian, Russian, Assyrian

Religion
- Mainly Christianity (Georgian Orthodoxy and Syriac Christianity)

Assyrians in Georgia (Georgian: ასურელები) number 2,377 (as of 2014), and most arrived in the Southern Caucasus in early 20th century when their ancestors fled present-day Turkey and Iran during the Assyrian genocide.

== History ==
Historically, the first Assyrians arrived in Georgia in the 6th century A.D. when 13 Assyrian monks (historically known to the Georgians as the thirteen holy Assyrian fathers) from the city of Edessa came to Georgia and established the Shio-Mgvime Monastery. Scholars have linked their contribution to the Christianization of Georgia, with Saint Nino leading the way of converts from paganism. Assyrians came in contact with Georgians once again in the 1760s. Assyrians under Ottoman rule were looking for some kind of protection from religious and ethnic persecution. Patriarch of the Assyrian Church of the East Shimun XV Maqdassi Mikhail requested of Georgian king Erekle II protection for Assyrians and the Yezidis of present-day Turkey. In April 1770, Georgian troops, under Russian command, headed towards the city of Akhaltsikhe. At the same time, Assyrian bishop Ishaya (Isaiah) left Tbilisi and carried letters to Assyrian and Yezidi leaders, whence the Georgian king invited them to fight together against the Ottomans. The Assyrians and Yezidis were prepared to move against the Ottomans, whenever the support from Erekle II arrived, but Russian General Totleben changed his mind and turned his detachment back to Kartli.

Historical population
Year	Pop.	±%
1939	4,707	—
1970	5,617	+19.3%
1979	5,286	−5.9%
1989	6,206	+17.4%
2002	3,299	−46.8%

The plans for military cooperation failed, but during the war that ensued, an Assyrian community of several dozen families appeared in Georgia. They arrived in Makhani from Persia and the Ottoman Empire. The second wave of Assyrian immigrants arrived when Russia signed the Treaty of Turkmenchay with Persia in 1828, where Assyrians and Kurds from Iran arrived in Georgia as workers. They also arrived in the second half of the 19th century and settled in Tbilisi, becoming Russian and later Soviet citizens. By the end of the 19th century, there were over five thousand Assyrians living in Georgia. A fourth and largest wave came in between the years of 1915 and 1918, as Assyrians fled from the Assyrian genocide.

== Today's Assyrian community in Georgia ==
On May 15, 2005, United States President George W. Bush met with the leaders of Georgia's Assyrians. The meeting was mostly about the situation of Assyrians in Iraq. Assyrian leaders also gave the American president a letter as well. When asked by Edgar Bitbunov, the Member of Assyrian International Congress "Nowadays American Georgian forces are on Assyrian soil in Iraq. Of course, we aren't indifferent to the fortune of assyrians in Iraq. What's their future like? What can you say about it?" Bush answered: "We consider that every nation is equally responsible to find its own way to develop and achieve its own object. Assyrians are equal in right to any other peoples living in Iraq these days. Assyrians other nations in Iraq first of all should change their way of thinking, should act more persistently, resolutely and bravery to achieve their own objects and principles all these are in their hands. The USA always stands for, defends and supports people fighting for justice, freedom, independence and democracy."

== Assyrian churches in Georgia ==
- Mar Shimon Bar Sabbae Assyrian Chaldean Catholic Church and Religious Cultural Center (2009), Tbilisi.
- Church of the Assumption of the Virgin Mary, Georgian Orthodox Church in Dzveli Kanda.
- Church of the Thirteen Assyrian Fathers, Georgian Orthodox Church in village Dzveli Kanda

== See also ==
- Assyrians in Armenia
- Assyrians in Azerbaijan
- Assyrians in Russia
- Assyrians in Turkey
