= Assyrians in Azerbaijan =

Azerbaijani Assyrians
ܣܘܪ̈ܝܐ ܕܐܙܪܒܝܓܐܢ Azərbaycan aysorları
- (Assyrian homeland) (Azerbaijan)

Total population
- ≈1,600

Regions with significant populations
- Baku; Agstafa; Nakhchivan; Goygol

Languages
- Assyrian, Azerbaijani, Russian

Religion
- Syriac Christianity

Assyrians in Azerbaijan (Syriac: ܣܘܪ̈ܝܐ ܕܐܙܪܒܝܓܐܢ; Azerbaijani: Azərbaycan aysorları), or Azerbaijani Assyrians, are Assyrian people or people of Assyrian descent living in the country of Azerbaijan. While their history in the country spans centuries, the modern immigration of Assyrians to the country is thought to have started in the 19th century, with the Treaty of Gulistan and Turkmenchay.

Determining the exact number of Assyrians in Azerbaijan is difficult, and it's believed that the community living in the country has become assimilated to larger Azerbaijani culture. However, the Joshua Project states that their population is around 1,600.

== History ==
Assyrians have had a long history of immigration in the Caucasus and the area that now comprises modern Azerbaijan. Some of the earliest known instances of Assyrian presence originate from the Thirteen Assyrian Fathers and the David Gareji monastery complex. However, the monastery is located on the Azerbaijan–Georgia border and is considered a World Heritage Site for Georgia.

After the treaties of Gulistan and Turkmenchay, Qajar Iran lost its territories in the Caucasus, and Assyrian emigration was influenced by the Russian Empire to what would become Azerbaijan and Armenia. By the end of the 1930's, Assyrians were believed to inhabit the cities of Shamkir and Goygol, having been resettled from Turkey and Iran. Assyrians also built the village of Siyaqut in the modern day Nakhchivan Autonomous Republic, with the people living there being religiously Chaldean Catholic.

Amid the First Nagorno-Karabakh War, Assyrians in Azerbaijan would flee to Russia and Armenia, as well as the Republic of Artsakh. During the Blockade of Nagorno-Karabakh as part of the larger Nagorno-Karabakh conflict, PM Zemfira Mirzoyeva testified how Artsakh's Assyrian community had been unable to leave the region due to the actions of the Azerbaijani government.

== Population ==
According to former actor and representative of the Armenian Assyrian community Razmik Khosroev, a community of 6,000 Assyrians lived in Azerbaijan before the First Nagorno-Karabakh War. Khosroev also stated that while the community didn't undergo specific pressure from Azeri authorities to leave, rising xenophobia as well as misunderstanding of Assyrian culture pressured them to abandon their property.

Assyrians had differing numbers of populations recorded under the Azerbaijan Soviet Socialist Republic, starting in 1926 with a population of 964. This population would increase to 1,815 in 1939, but would begin to decrease starting with 1,367 in 1959, 1,231 in 1970, and finally with 646 in 1989, around the fall of the Azerbaijani SSR.

In Goygol, Assyrians are believed to number as high as three families as of 2016. The once prominent community of Assyrians living there are believed to have left following the First Nagorno-Karabakh War.

During the 2015 census for the Republic of Artsakh, 16 Assyrians were recorded as having lived there, while the overwhelming majority of the population were ethnic Armenians.

== Religion ==
The overwhelming majority of Assyrians in Azerbaijan adhere to the Assyrian Church of the East, while other Assyrian churches, such as the Chaldean Catholic Church, had a historical diocese in the country. The Syriac Orthodox Church is not known to have had a nominal presence in the country, but have engaged with delegations which included Julius Hanna Aydin, Archbishop for Ecumenical Affairs of the Syrian Orthodox Church in Germany in an official delegation in Azerbajian in 2024.

== Assimilation ==
Although the Assyrian community has preserved unique funeral rituals and still uses Neo-Aramaic names, they are believed to be heavily assimilated into the larger society and culture of the Azerbaijan. One example of a similarity between Azeri and Assyrian cultures is Kochari, which has variants across both communities.

== See also ==
- Assyrian diaspora
- Assyrians in Armenia
- Assyrians in Iran
- Assyrians in Russia
