= Gyolaysor =

Gyolaysor Գյոլայսոր
- Village
- Location within Armenia Location within Ararat
- Coordinates: 40°03′40″N 44°49′00″E
- Country: Armenia
- Marz (Province): Ararat

Gyolaysor (Armenian: Գյոլայսոր , also Armenian: Գյոլ Այսոր, Գյոլասոր, Այսորի, Գելայսոր, Կելասուր, Կելասուրի, Քեղ, Քեղա, Քեղ Այսորի), former village in the Erivan uezd of the Erivan Governorate and during the Soviet period in the Artashat region of the Armenian SSR (in the territory of modern Ararat Province in Armenia), located in Khosrov Forest. The village was founded in 1833 by Assyrian families emigrating from the Ottoman Empire. The village was abandoned 1949. At the end of 1960s, the village was officially suspended. Most of the inhabitants of the village have emigrated to Verin Dvin village.

== Population ==
in 1831 there were 62 inhabitants in the village, all of them Muslims. In 1959, it was inhabited by 148 people consisting of Armenians, Assyrians and Azeris. In 1967, there were 15 houses with 80 Armenian population in the village.

Population dynamics
Year	1831	1873	1897	1926	1939	1959	1967
Population	62	240	782	404	702	148	80

== See also ==
- Ararat Province
