= Siyaqut =

- Municipality
- Location within Azerbaijan
- Coordinates: 39°32′16″N 45°01′24″E
- Country: Azerbaijan
- Autonomous republic: Nakhchivan
- District: Sharur

Population (2005)
  - Total: 1,577
- Time zone: UTC+4 (AZT)

Siyaqut is a village and municipality in the Sharur District of Nakhchivan, Azerbaijan. It is located 10 km in the south-east from the district center, on the Sharur plain. Its population of 1,577 is busy with gardening, vegetable-growing and beet-growing. There are a secondary school, two libraries, club, cultural center, park, mosque and a medical center in the village.

== Etymology and history ==
The settlement was founded by the Assyrian families which moved from the Siyaqut village of Iran in the beginning of the 19th century. The name is a compound of the Iranian words siya (black) and gut (fortress), meaning "black fortress".

The village was founded in the 1850s by Assyrian immigrants from Salmas, Persia, and remained the only Chaldean Catholic village in the South Caucasus, then under the control of the Russian Empire. Beginning in the 1880s, the priest serving in Siyaqut was ordained by the Roman Catholic bishop.

== See also ==
- Assyrians in Azerbaijan
