= Dvin, Armenia =

Dvin Դվին
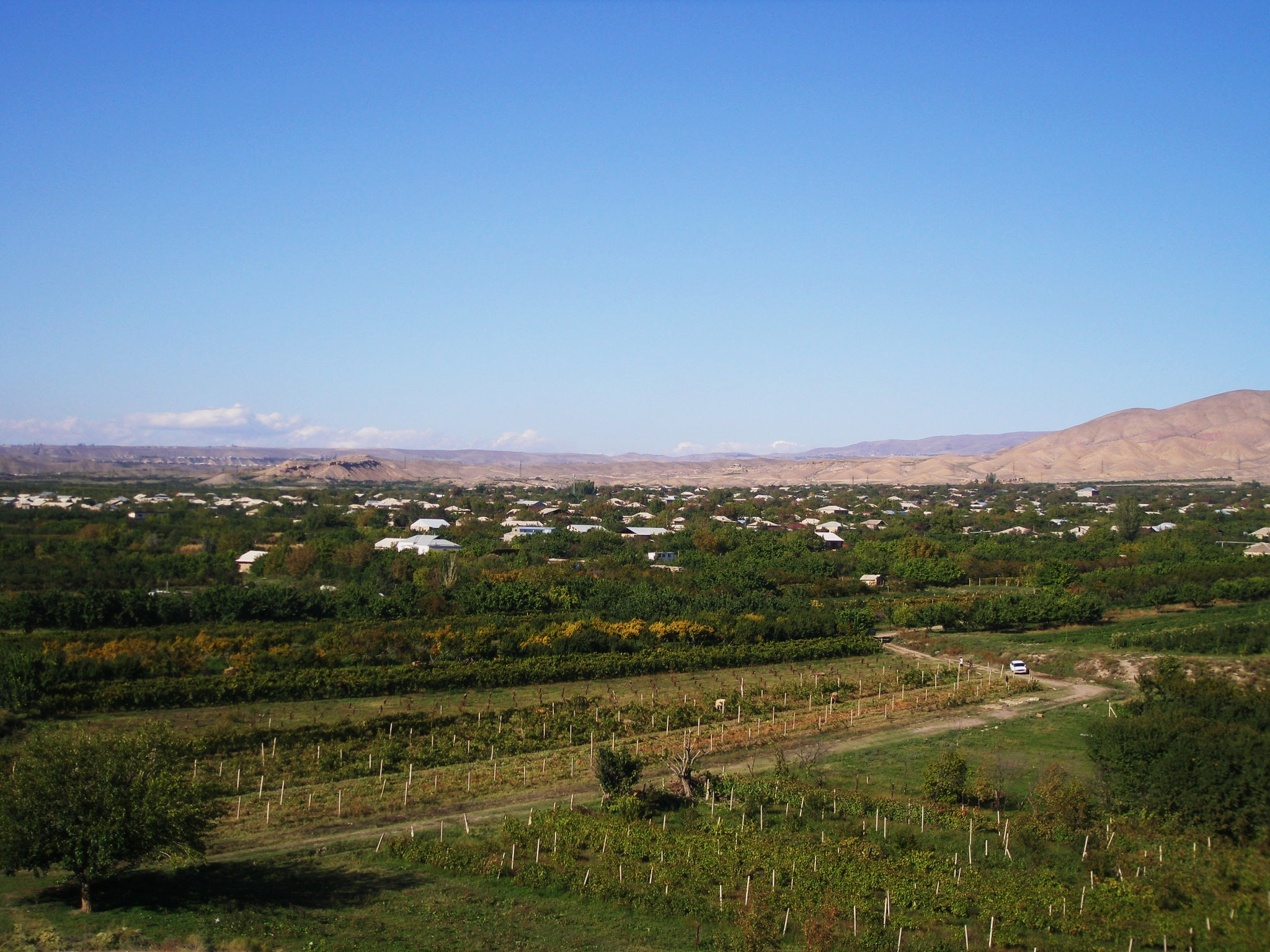
- The modern village of Dvin (left) and Verin Dvin (right)

- Location within Armenia Location within Ararat
- Coordinates: 40°01′12″N 44°35′07″E
- Country: Armenia
- Province: Ararat
- Municipality: Artashat

Government
  - Mayor: Artsrun Abrahamyan

Area
  - Total: 7.46 km^{2} (2.88 sq mi)

Population (2011)
  - Total: 2,751
- Time zone: UTC+4
  - Summer (DST): UTC+5

Dvin (Armenian: Դվին) is a village in the Artashat Municipality of the Ararat Province of Armenia. It is located near the ruins of the ancient city of Dvin.
