= Hnaberd, Aragatsotn =

Hnaberd Հնաբերդ
- Location within Armenia Location within Aragatsotn
- Coordinates: 40°38′34″N 44°08′40″E
- Country: Armenia
- Province: Aragatsotn
- Municipality: Tsaghkahovit

Population (2011)
  - Total: 1,836
- Time zone: UTC+4
  - Summer (DST): UTC+5

Hnaberd (Armenian: Հնաբերդ) is a village in the Tsaghkahovit Municipality of the Aragatsotn Province of Armenia. The town has a 5th-century church. There is a large Urartian fortress nearby.
