= Lina Yakubova =

Documentary film producer and writer

Lina Yakubova (Russian: Лина Якубова; 23 December 1976 – 21 March 2011) was a documentary film producer and writer. She was born to an Assyrian father, Albert Yakubov and Armenian mother, Karina Khachaturyan in the Assyrian Village of Dmitrovo (Qoyalasar), Armenia. She eventually moved to Artashat with her family where she lived for the remainder of her life. Yakubova spoke Assyrian, Armenian, Russian and English. She attended the Erevan Institute of Theatre and Cinema. She received her undergraduate degree in Cinematography and in 2006 Yakubova was a PhD candidate. She worked at the Central Radio of Armenia, presenting programs primarily about Assyrians and Armenians. During a visit to Los Angeles, California, Yakubova died unexpectedly at the age of 35. The cause of death was reported as undiagnosed liver cancer. Funeral services were held in Los Angeles on 25 March 2011. Yakubova produced and wrote several documentary films about Assyrians and Armenians specifically for the two communities.

== Documentary filmography ==
Year	Title	Note	Credit/Notes
2006	Ancestral Home	Three Part Documentary: I. Syria (Asoriq), II. Khabur, III. Heritage	producer, writer
2006	Gates of the East		producer, writer
2005	A Forgotten Page of a Nation		producer, writer
2005	Second Homeland	Two Part Documentary: I. Urmi, II. Community	producer, writer
2003	Assyrians in Armenia	ISBN 0-9744450-8-8	producer, writer
2009	Assyrian Way	Three Part Documentary: I. To Survive Through..., II. Revival, III. To Itemize the Portrait	producer, writer
????	Assyrian Poetry Collection		producer, writer
2009	Paths of Fate		producer, writer
2010	The Power of Faith		producer, writer
2010	Alphabet. Our Assyrian Heritage		producer, writer

== Discography ==
Year	Title	Note	Credit/Notes
2007	Assyrian Way	CD	producer
2007	Chants from the East	3 CD Collection of Liturgical Music of the Assyrian church of the East	producer

== Book ==
Year	Title	Note	Credit/Notes
2008	Chants from the East	The Liturgical Music of the Assyrian church of the East	producer

== See also ==
- List of Assyrians
