= Nor Artagers =

Village in Armavir, Armenia

Nor Artagers Նոր Արտագերս
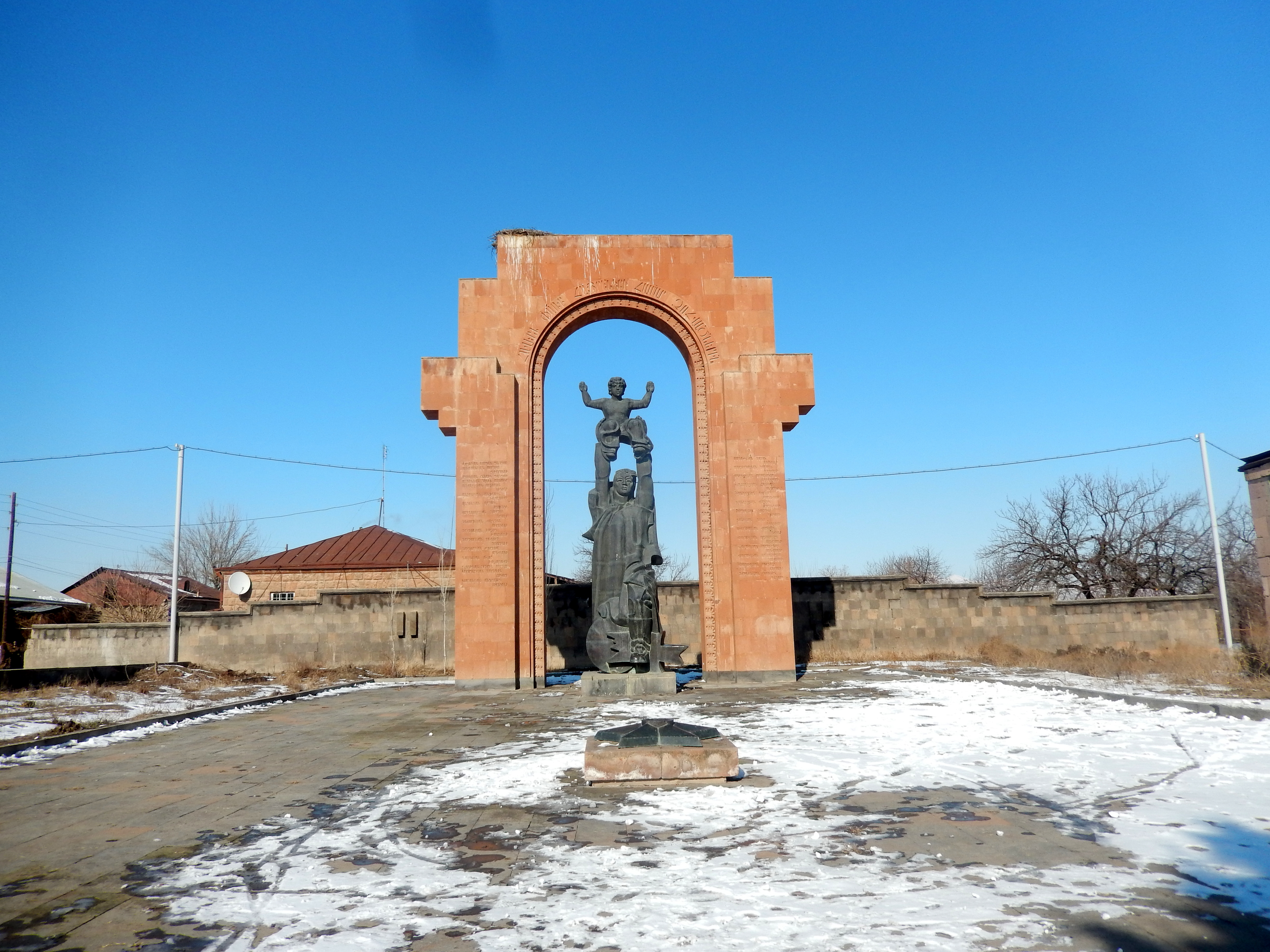
- Monument devoted to the victims of Second World War in Nor Artagers

- Location within Armenia
- Coordinates: 40°04′N 44°00′E
- Country: Armenia
- Marz (Province): Armavir

Population (2011)
  - Total: 1,224
- Time zone: UTC+4

Nor Artagers (Armenian: Նոր Արտագերս), is a village in the Armavir Province of Armenia. The village is inhabited by Armenians (52%, around 641 individuals), Yazidis (27%, around 327 individuals) and Assyrians (21%, around 256 individuals).

== See also ==
- Armavir Province
