= Verin Dvin =

Village in Ararat marz, Armenia

Verin Dvin Վերին Դվին
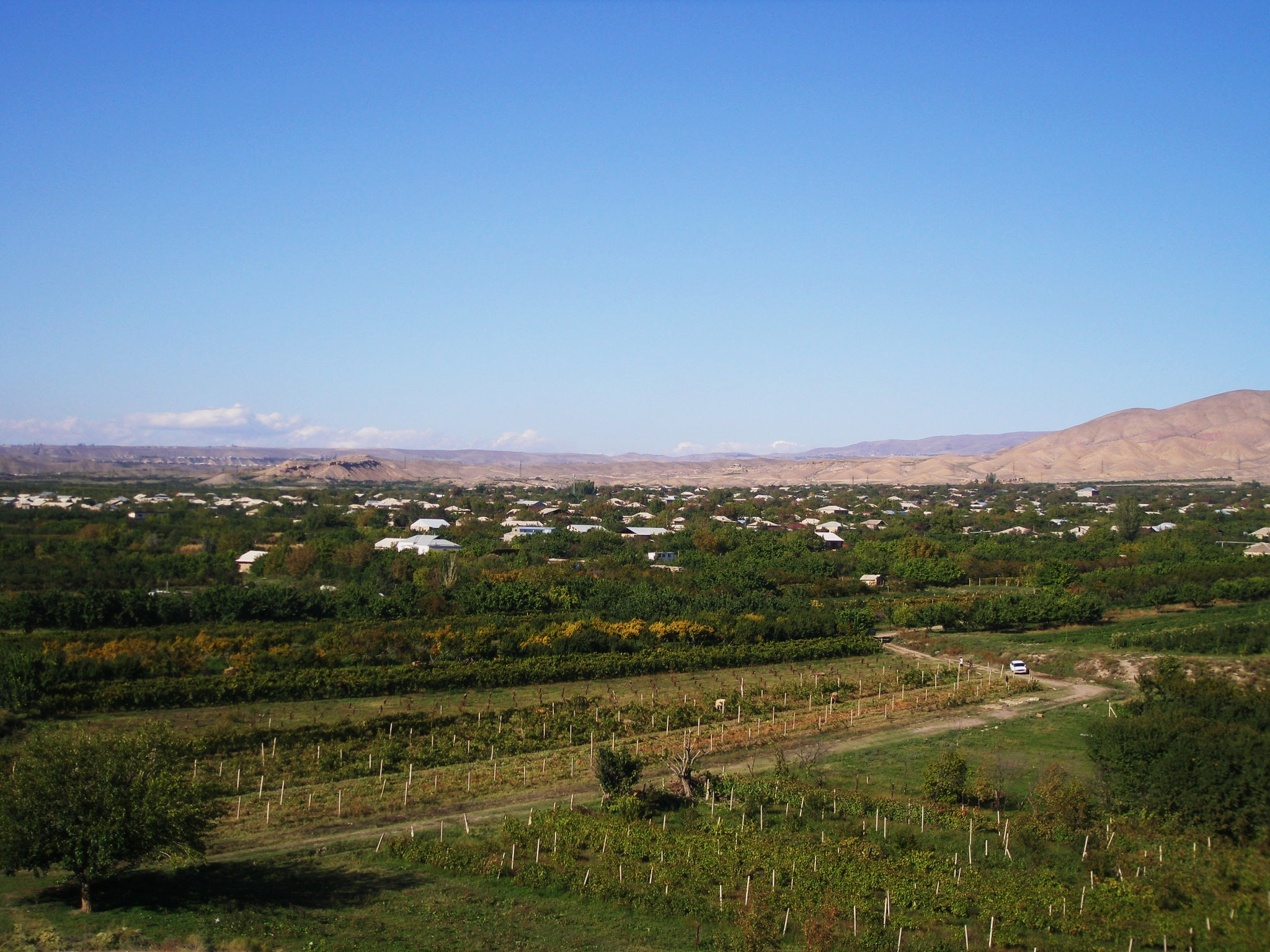
- The villages of Dvin (left) and Verin Dvin (right)

- Location within Armenia Location within Ararat
- Coordinates: 40°01′31″N 44°35′27″E
- Country: Armenia
- Province: Ararat
- Municipality: Verin Dvin

Government
  - Mayor: Lyudmila Petrova

Area
  - Total: 6.9 km^{2} (2.7 sq mi)

Population (2011)
  - Total: 1,831
- Time zone: UTC+4
  - Summer (DST): UTC+5

Verin Dvin (Armenian: Վերին Դվին) is a village in the Verin Dvin Municipality of the Ararat Province of Armenia, located 30 kilometers south of Yerevan. The largest Assyrian community in Armenia is in Verin Dvin, where around 2,000 out of the 2,700 residents in the village are ethnic Assyrians. The village is home to 2 Assyrian churches including the church of Mar Tuma (Saint Thomas) dating back to 1828. The village is built near the ruins of the ancient city of Dvin.

The secondary school of the village has a majority of ethnic Assyrian students and provides lessons in Assyrian history and language.
