= Dimitrov, Armenia =

Village in Ararat, Armenia

Dimitrov Դիմիտրով
- Location within Armenia Location within Ararat
- Coordinates: 40°00′29″N 44°29′17″E
- Country: Armenia
- Province: Ararat
- Municipality: Artashat

Population (2011)
  - Total: 1,391
- Time zone: UTC+4
  - Summer (DST): UTC+5

Dimitrov (Armenian: Դիմիտրով), or Ghuylasar Nerkin until 1949, is a village in the Artashat Municipality of the Ararat Province of Armenia.

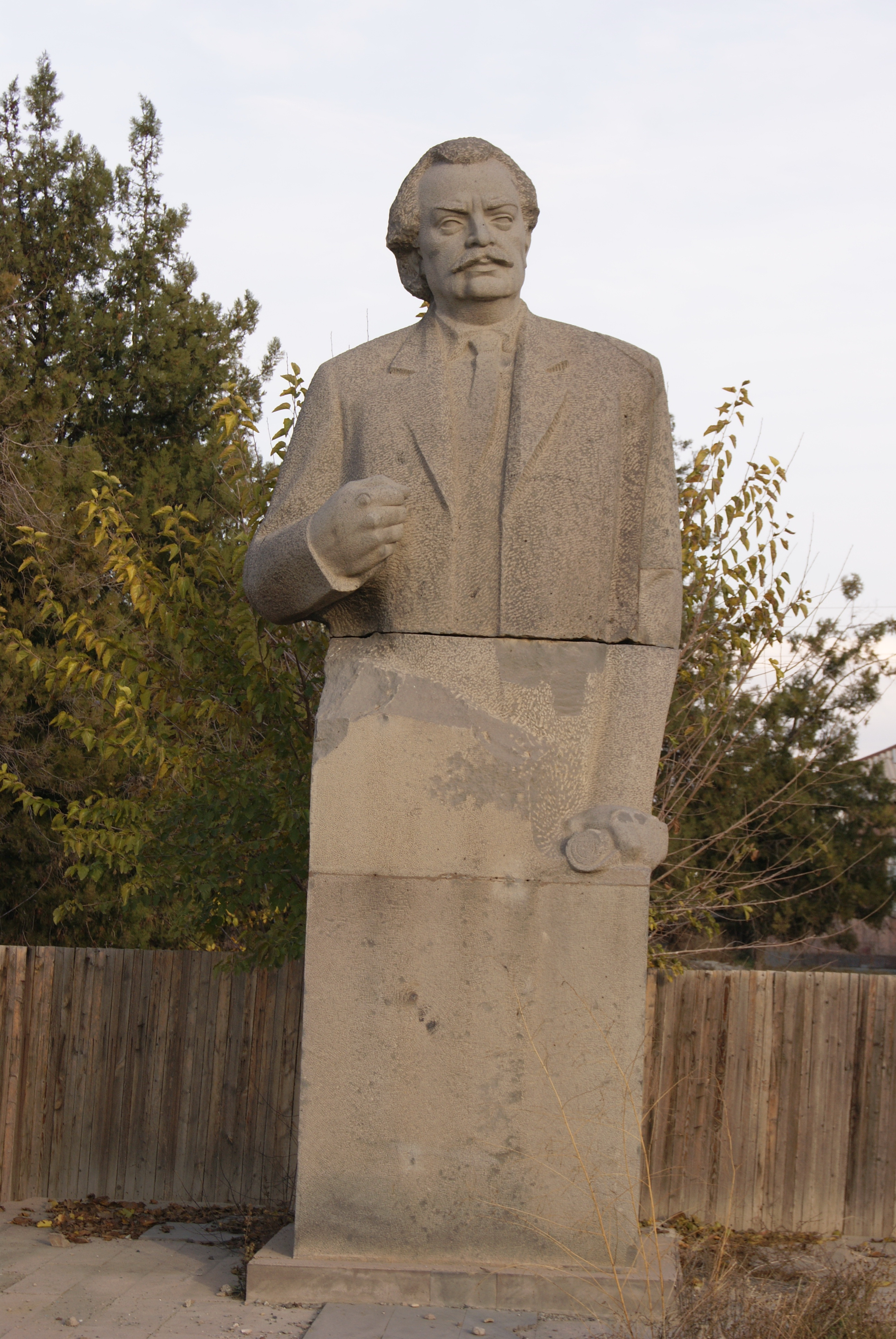
Monument to Georgi Dimitrov in Dimitrov village

It was renamed in 1949 in honor of Georgi Dimitrov − Comintern and Bulgarian Communist leader and prime minister of Bulgaria.

The village is inhabited mainly by Armenians and Assyrians.
