= Hnaberd, Ararat =

Village in Ararat, Armenia

Hnaberd Հնաբերդ
- Location within Armenia Location within Ararat
- Coordinates: 40°00′21″N 44°34′28″E
- Country: Armenia
- Province: Ararat
- Municipality: Artashat

Population (2011)
  - Total: 611
- Time zone: UTC+4
  - Summer (DST): UTC+5

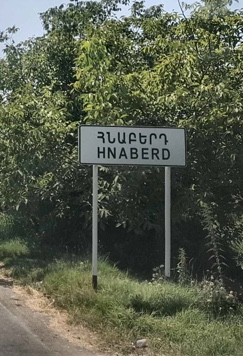
Hnaberd village

Hnaberd (Armenian: Հնաբերդ) is a village in the Artashat Municipality of the Ararat Province of Armenia.
