= Erivan uezd =

County of the Russian Empire

Coordinates: 40°10′53″N 44°30′52″E

Erivan uezd Эриванский уезд
- Uezd
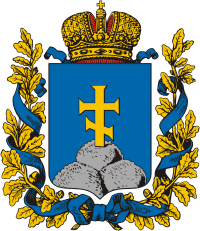
- Coat of arms

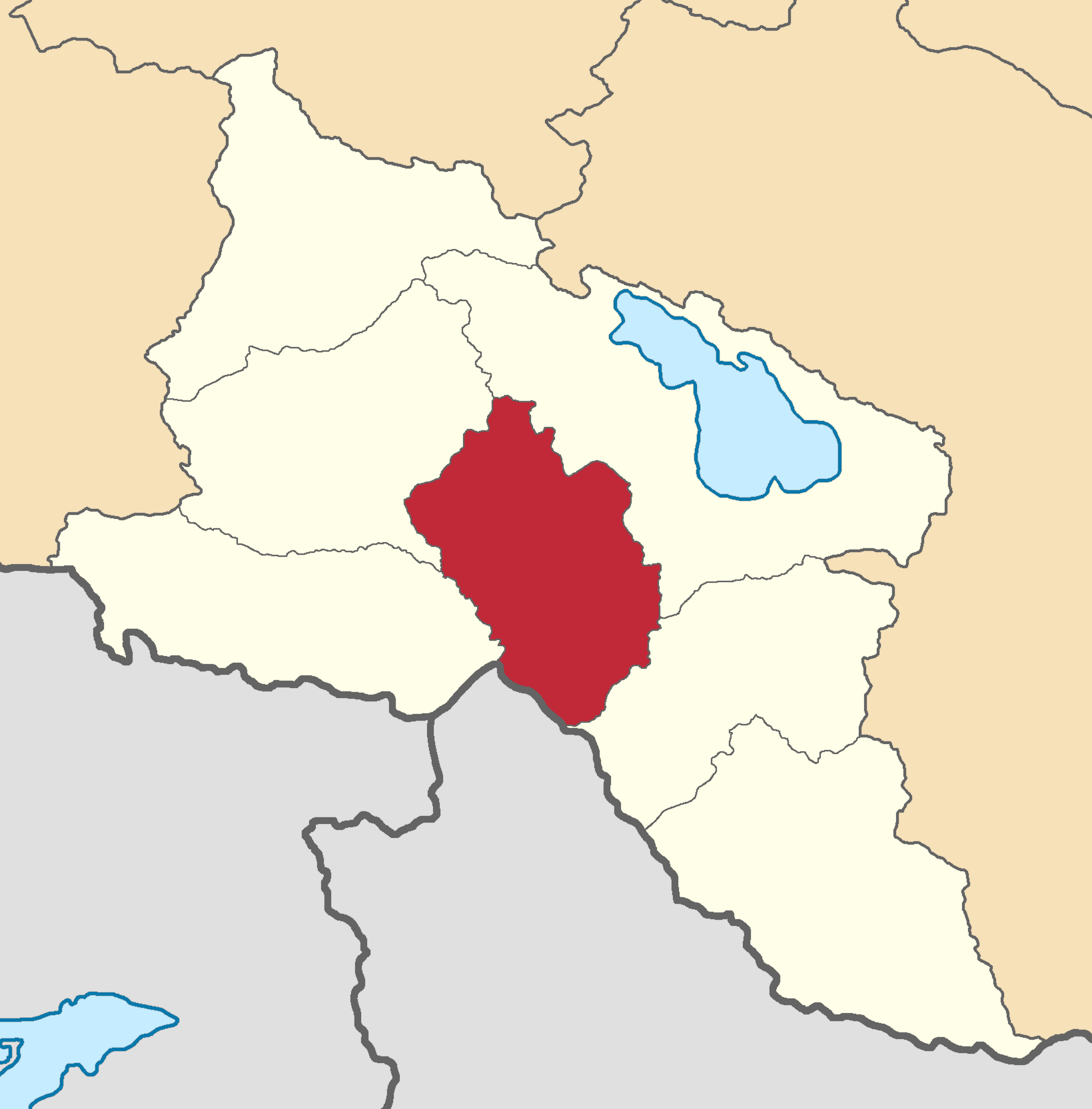
- Location in the Erivan Governorate
- Country: Russian Empire
- Viceroyalty: Caucasus
- Governorate: Erivan
- Established: 1840
- Abolished: 1930
- Capital: Erivan (present-day Yerevan)

Area
  - Total: 3,100.42 km^{2} (1,197.08 sq mi)

Population (1916)
  - Total: 205,617
  - Density: 66.3191/km^{2} (171.766/sq mi)
  - Urban: 24.94%
  - Rural: 75.06%

The Erivan uezd (Note: Russian: Эриванский уезд, pre-reform orthography: Эриванскій уѣздъ, romanized: Erivanskiy uyezd [ɪrʲɪvənskəjə ʊ(j)ɪst]; Armenian: Երևանի գավառ, classical orthography: Երեւանի գաւառ, romanized: Erewani gawaṙ [jɛɾɛˈvɑni ɡɑˈvɑr]; Azerbaijani: ایروان قضاسی, romanized: İrəvan qəzası) was a county (uezd) of the Erivan Governorate of the Caucasus Viceroyalty of the Russian Empire. The uezd bordered the Etchmiadzin and Surmalu uezds to the west, the Nor Bayazet uezd to the east, the Sharur-Daralayaz uezd to the south, and Iran to the southwest. It included most of the Ararat Province and southern parts of the Kotayk Province of central Armenia, the Sadarak District of the Nakhchivan exclave of Azerbaijan, and the Aras corridor of the Aralık District of the Iğdır Province of Turkey. The administrative centre of the county was the city of Erivan (present-day Yerevan, the capital of Armenia).

== Economy ==
The population was engaged primarily in agricultural farming, gardening, and winemaking. Approximately 50% of the wine in the Erivan Governorate was produced in the Erivan uezd. According to statistical data, there were 129,120 great cattle in the uezd, which made up 11% of the cattle in the whole governorate.

== Geography ==
The northeastern part of the uezd was mountainous and rocky while the southwestern part consisted of steppes and plains. The southwestern part was watered by the Aras River with the lowest altitude of 2,667 ft (813 m) on the border with Sharur-Daralayaz uezd. The administrative center Erivan laid at 3,200 ft (980 m) above sea level, which was the highest point of the uezd. Among the rivers discharging into the Aras were the Zanga, the Garni-chay, and the Vedi-chay, which usually dried out during the summers and became active in the winters.

== History ==
The territory of the uezd had been a part of Persia's Erivan Khanate until 1828, when according to the Treaty of Turkmenchay, it was annexed to the Russian Empire. It was administered as part of the Armenian Oblast from 1828 to 1840. In 1844, the Caucasus Viceroyalty was re-established, in which the territory of the Erivan uezd formed part of the Tiflis Governorate. In 1849, the Erivan Governorate was established, separate from the Tiflis Governorate.

In 1918, the uezd became a part of the First Republic of Armenia, partially being occupied by the Ottoman army through much of 1918 as a result of the Treaty of Batum until its reincorporation into Armenian administration in the December of 1918. Many of the Azerbaijanis in the southern rural portions of the uezd, particularly in centers including Böyük Vedi (Vedi), Davalu (Ararat) and Ulukhanlu–Zangibasar (Masis) after being prompted by Kemalist Turkish agents engaged in rebellion against the Armenian government, hostilities lasting from July 1919 until the Sovietization of Armenia.

After the establishment of Soviet power on 3 December 1920, most of the uezd formed part of the Armenian SSR, the center Erivan (Yerevan) serving as the new government's capital. The southernmost parts of the uezd corresponding to the locality of Sadarak became the northernmost section of the new Nakhichevan ASSR of the Azerbaijan SSR and the outer southwestern strip of the uezd, corresponding to the Aras corridor on the west bank of the Aras river, was ceded to Turkey in accordance with the treaties of Moscow and Kars.

== Administrative divisions ==
The subcounties (uchastoks) of the Erivan uezd in 1913 were as follows:

Name	1912 population	Area
1-y uchastok (1-й участок)	39,898	718.98 square versts (818.24 km^{2}; 315.93 mi^{2})
2-y uchastok (2-й участок)	41,074	259.30 square versts (295.10 km^{2}; 113.94 mi^{2})
3-y uchastok (3-й участок)	35,862	632.92 square versts (720.30 km^{2}; 278.11 mi^{2})
4-y uchastok (4-й участок)	48,334	1,113.10 square versts (1,266.78 km^{2}; 489.11 mi^{2})

== Demographics ==
=== Russian Empire Census ===
Native languages in the Erivan uezd in 1897
1. Tatar (51.4%)
2. Armenian (38.5%)
3. Kurdish (5.43%)
4. Russian (2.02%)
5. Assyrian (1.52%)
6. Other (1.13%)

According to the Russian Empire Census, the Erivan uezd had a population of 150,879 on 28 January [O.S. 15 January] 1897, including 82,899 men and 67,980 women. The majority of the population indicated Tatar (Note: Before 1918, Azerbaijanis were generally known as "Tatars". This term, employed by the Russians, referred to Turkic-speaking Muslims of the South Caucasus. After 1918, with the establishment of the Azerbaijan Democratic Republic and "especially during the Soviet era", the Tatar group identified itself as "Azerbaijani".) to be their mother tongue, with significant Armenian and Kurdish speaking minorities.

Linguistic composition of the Erivan uezd in 1897
Language	Native speakers	%
Tatar	77,491	51.36
Armenian	58,148	38.54
Kurdish	8,195	5.43
Russian	3,052	2.02
Assyrian	2,288	1.52
Ukrainian	652	0.43
Jewish	326	0.22
Polish	196	0.13
Georgian	152	0.10
German	80	0.05
Persian	76	0.05
Lithuanian	59	0.04
Greek	32	0.02
Belarusian	9	0.01
Italian	3	0.00
Mordovian	1	0.00
Turkish	1	0.00
Other	118	0.08
TOTAL	150,879	100.00

=== Kavkazskiy kalendar ===
Nationalities in the Erivan uezd in 1916
1. Armenians (52.0%)
2. Shia Muslims (41.8%)
3. Kurds (3.29%)
4. Russians (1.21%)
5. Asiatic Christians (0.93%)
6. Others (0.78%)

According to the 1917 publication of Kavkazskiy kalendar, the Erivan uezd had a population of 205,617 on 14 January [O.S. 1 January] 1916, including 108,228 men and 97,389 women, 157,100 of whom were the permanent population, and 48,517 were temporary residents. The statistics indicated an overwhelmingly Armenian population in the capital Erivan, with a significant Shia Muslim population, conversely, in the rural peripheries of the district, the population had a Shia Muslim plurality with a significant Armenian minority:

Nationality	Urban		Rural		TOTAL	
Nationality	Number	%	Number	%	Number	%
Armenians	37,223	72.58	69,710	45.17	106,933	52.01
Shia Muslims (Note: Primarily Tatars.)	12,557	24.48	73,344	47.52	85,901	41.78
Kurds	39	0.08	6,724	4.36	6,763	3.29
Russians	1,059	2.06	1,435	0.93	2,494	1.21
Asiatic Christians	0	0.00	1,916	1.24	1,916	0.93
Sunni Muslims (Note: Primarily Turco-Tatars.)	9	0.02	831	0.54	840	0.41
Jews	196	0.38	81	0.05	277	0.13
Roma	0	0.00	237	0.15	237	0.12
Georgians	203	0.40	3	0.00	206	0.10
North Caucasians	0	0.00	50	0.03	50	0.02
TOTAL	51,286	100.00	154,331	100.00	205,617	100.00

== Settlements ==
According to the 1897 census, there were 82 settlements in the Erivan uezd with a population over 500 inhabitants. The religious composition of the settlements was as follows:

Name		Faith				TOTAL		
Russian	Romanized	Armenian Apostolic	Muslim	Eastern Orthodox	Jewish	Male	Female	Both
Авшар	Avshar	1,164				608	558	1,166
Агамзалу	Agamzalu (Marmarashen)	404	376			437	351	788
Агбаш Нижний	Agbash Nizhniy (Arevshat)	612				325	301	626
Алимамед	Alimamed (abandoned)		965			527	438	965
Арамус	Aramus	1,197				643	585	1,228
Арбат	Arbat		671			361	310	671
Ардашар	Ardashar (Verin Artashat)	1,288				671	628	1,299
Арзни	Arzni		121	537		357	301	658
Ариндж	Arinj	538				279	259	538
Аяслу	Ayaslu (Aygestan)	537				288	256	544
Баш-Гарни	Bash-Garni (Garni)	1,507				794	713	1,507
Башкенд	Bashkend (Akunk)	797				443	384	827
Башналу	Bashnalu (Baghramyan)	600	70			343	330	673
Бекджигазлу	Bekjigazlu (Vostan)	1,260				672	598	1,270
Беюк-Боролон	Beyuk-Borolon (abandoned)		564			277	287	564
Беюк-Веди	Beyuk-Vedi (Vedi)		2,792			1514	1284	2,798
Беюк-Далуляр	Beyuk-Dalulyar (Dalar)	750	134			461	430	891
Биралу	Biralu (Lanjar)	677				374	303	677
Гаджи (Эйляз)	Gaji (Eylyaz) (Darakert)		1,457			762	695	1,457
Гек-Килиса	Gek-Kilisa (Kaputan)	579	424			484	519	1,003
Гель-Айсор	Gel-Aysor (abandoned)		531	230		438	338	776
Горсван	Gorsvan (unknown)		530			287	243	530
Гямриз	Gyamriz (Kamaris)	1,083				579	518	1,097
Давалу	Davalu (Ararat)	2,559	686			1,840	1,527	3,367
Даргалу Нижний	Dargalu Nizhniy (Aygezard)	670				360	321	681
Двин Айсорский	Dvin Aysorskiy (Verin Dvin)		76	641		378	367	745
Двин Армянский (Дугюн)	Dvin Armyanskiy (Dugyun) (Dvin)	508	192			342	358	700
Двин-Кюрд-Кенд	Dvin-Kyurd-Kend (Norashen)	558				280	284	564
Джаткран	Jatkran (Geghashen)	1,084				566	519	1,085
Дживриш (Джервех)	Jivrish (Jevrekh) (Jrvezh)	434	58			271	221	492
Джирманис (Келани)	Jirmanis (Kelani) (abandoned)		853			475	378	853
Донгузьян	Donguzyan (Zorak)		1,077			564	513	1,077
Елгован (Парцаби)	Yelgovan (Partsabi) (Kotayk)	555				300	270	570
Занджирлу	Zanjirlu (abandoned)	1,587				878	709	1,587
Зар	Zar	386	757			616	527	1,143
Иманшалу	Imanshalu (Mkhchyan)	1,170				613	564	1,177
Кадылу	Kadylu (Lanjanist)		588			353	235	588
Камарлу	Kamarlu (Artashat)	1,987				1,251	933	2,184
Камарлу	Kamarlu (absorbed by Artashat)		734		95	473	360	833
Канакир	Kanakir (Kanaker)	1,626		169		1,175	652	1,827
Карабагляр Нижний (Чиманкенд)	Karabaglyar Nizhny (Chimankend) (Urtsadzor)		1,260			697	563	1,260
Карагамзалу	Karagamzalu (Burastan)	525	246			406	365	771
Каракишляг	Karakishlyag (Hayanist)		1,007			550	457	1,007
Каралар	Karalar (Aralez)		569			311	264	575
Карахач	Karakhach (Lusashogh)	416	589			531	474	1,005
Кашха	Kashka (Vardashat)	554				286	268	554
Кешиш-Веран	Keshish-Veran (Urtsalanj)	544				302	242	544
Кичик-Веди	Kichik-Vedi (Pokr Vedi)		971			505	466	971
Кичик-Далуляр (Гедаклу)	Kichik-Dalulyar (Gedaklu) (Mrgavan)	836				418	418	836
Койласар Нижний	Koylasar Nizhniy (Dimitrov)	124		592		389	346	735
Кямал	Kyamal (abandoned)		597			298	299	597
Кюллуджа	Kyulluja (Zovk)		524			285	239	524
Масумлу	Masumlu (Aygepat)		507			255	252	507
Неджилу Верхний	Nejilu Verkhniy (Nizami)		791			425	366	791
Неджилу Нижний	Nejilu Nizhniy (Sayat Nova)		1,178			633	545	1,178
Новрузлу	Novruzlu (abandoned)	1,092	180			701	643	1,344
Нурнус	Nurnus		550			305	245	550
Огурбеклу	Ogurbeklu (Berkanush)	456	110			293	287	580
Сабунчи	Sabunchi (Araksavan)		1,000			541	459	1,000
Садарак	Sadarak		4,826			2,712	2,130	4,842
Сарванляр-Улия	Sarvanlyar-Uliya (Sis)		953			544	409	953
Тазакенд	Tazakend (Ayntap)	899				479	440	919
Тазакенд (Норашен)	Tazakend (Norashen) (abandoned)	580				296	284	580
Теджирабат	Tejirabat (Dzoraghbyur)	604				307	297	604
Тоханшалу	Tokhanshalu (absorbed by Masis)	543				285	258	543
Тутия	Tutiya (Saranist)		568			300	268	568
Улуханлу	Ulukhanlu (Masis)		2,757			1,518	1,239	2,757
Халиса	Khalisa (Noyakert)		1,165			619	546	1,165
Хачапарах	Khachaparakh (Khachpar)		1,059			561	498	1,059
Чанахчи Нижний	Chanakhchi Nizhniy (Zangakatun)	1,129				625	504	1,129
Чикдамлу	Chikdamlu (Azatavan)	1,122	135			679	578	1,257
Чинаханлу	Chinakhanlu (abandoned)		698			389	309	698
Шагаблу	Shagablu (Shaghap)		853			475	378	853
Шагаблу	Shagablu (Mayakovski)	519				265	254	519
Шидлу	Shidlu (Yeghegnavan)		992			529	463	992
Ширабат (Паракар)	Shirabat (Parakar) (Parakar)	662				326	340	666
Шихляр	Shikhlyar (Lusarat)		790			394	396	790
Шорлу-Демурчи	Shorlu-Demurchi (Darbnik)		1,360			740	620	1,360
Шорлу-Мехмандар	Shorlu-Mekhmandar (Hovtashat)		1,824			1,000	824	1,824
Эйляр	Eylyar (Abovyan)	505				257	248	505
Эривань	Erivan (Yerevan)	12,526	12,516	2,929		17,328	11,678	29,006
Юва	Yuva (Shahumyan)	1,905				1,056	923	1,979
TOTAL		51,658	54,231	5,098	95	62,474	50,449	112,923

== Bibliography ==
- Bournoutian, George A. (2018). Armenia and Imperial Decline: The Yerevan Province, 1900–1914. Milton Park, Abingdon, Oxon: Routledge. ISBN 978-1-351-06260-2. OCLC 1037283914.
- Hovannisian, Richard G. (1971). The Republic of Armenia. Vol. 1: The First Year, 1918–1919. Berkeley: University of California Press. ISBN 978-0520019843.
- Кавказский календарь на 1913 год [Caucasian calendar for 1913] (in Russian) (68th ed.). Tiflis: Tipografiya kantselyarii Ye.I.V. na Kavkaze, kazenny dom. 1913. Archived from the original on 19 April 2022.
- Кавказский календарь на 1917 год [Caucasian calendar for 1917] (in Russian) (72nd ed.). Tiflis: Tipografiya kantselyarii Ye.I.V. na Kavkaze, kazenny dom. 1917. Archived from the original on 4 November 2021.
- Tsutsiev, Arthur (2014). Atlas of the Ethno-Political History of the Caucasus (PDF). Translated by Nora Seligman Favorov. New Haven: Yale University Press. ISBN 9780300153088. Archived (PDF) from the original on 17 June 2023.
