= Circles of latitude between the 35th parallel north and the 40th parallel north =

Circles of latitude

Following are circles of latitude between the 35th parallel north and the 40th parallel north:

== 36th parallel north ==
36th parallel north (interactive map)

The 36th parallel north is a circle of latitude that is 36 degrees north of the Earth's equatorial plane. It crosses Africa, the Mediterranean Sea, Asia, the Pacific Ocean, North America and the Atlantic Ocean. In the ancient Mediterranean world, its role for navigation and geography was similar to that played by the Equator today.

From 7 April 1991 to 31 December 1996, the parallel defined the limit of the northern no-fly zone in Iraq.

At this latitude the sun is visible for 14 hours, 36 minutes during the summer solstice and 9 hours, 43 minutes during the winter solstice.

=== United States ===
In the United States, the 36th parallel north is occasionally used as a rough northern boundary for the Sun Belt, a region spanning most Southern and Southwestern states and comprising most of the nation's warmest climates.

Cities and landmarks close to the parallel include the following: Kettleman City, California; Henderson, Nevada; Hoover Dam; South Rim of the Grand Canyon; Los Alamos National Laboratory; Tulsa, Oklahoma (passing through the southern portion of the city); Nashville, Tennessee (passing through the southern portion of the city); Knoxville, Tennessee; Winston-Salem, North Carolina; High Point, North Carolina; Greensboro, North Carolina; Durham, North Carolina; Chapel Hill, North Carolina; and others. The parallel helped define the North Carolina–Tennessee–Virginia Corners.

The sixth standard parallel south of Mount Diablo Range at 35°48′ north, 13.8344 miles south of the 36th parallel, forms a continuous boundary between the California counties of Monterey, Kings, Tulare, and Inyo on the north and the counties of San Luis Obispo, Kern, and San Bernardino on the south. It is sometimes taken as the boundary between Central California and Southern California.

The parallel 36° north approximately forms the southernmost boundary of the Missouri Bootheel with the State of Arkansas.

The 36th parallel passes through Duke University in several places. Its Campus Drive that connects the campuses crosses the parallel several times. The Duke Gardens has a "36th Parallel Club" although the garden itself is just north of the parallel.

=== Around the world ===
Starting at the Prime Meridian and heading eastwards, the parallel 36° north passes through:

Coordinates	Country, territory or sea	Notes
36°0′N 0°0′E	Mediterranean Sea	
36°0′N 0°7′E	Algeria	Passing through Mostaganem
36°0′N 8°18′E	Tunisia	
36°0′N 10°31′E	Mediterranean Sea	Passing just north of the island of Linosa, Italy; Passing between the islands of Comino and Malta, Malta
36°0′N 23°10′E	Aegean Sea	Passing between the islands of Kythira and Antikythera, Greece; Passing just north of Saria Island, Greece
36°0′N 27°45′E	Greece	Island of Rhodes
36°0′N 27°55′E	Mediterranean Sea	
36°0′N 35°59′E	Turkey	Hatay Province
36°0′N 36°22′E	Syria	Passing just north of Raqqa
36°0′N 41°17′E	Iraq	
36°0′N 45°21′E	Iran	
36°0′N 61°10′E	Turkmenistan	
36°0′N 63°49′E	Afghanistan	
36°0′N 71°15′E	Pakistan	Khyber Pakhtunkhwa; Gilgit-Baltistan - claimed by India
36°0′N 76°6′E	Shaksgam Valley	Area administered by China, claimed by India
36°0′N 76°48′E	China	Xinjiang; Tibet; Qinghai; Gansu — passing just south of Lanzhou; Ningxia; Gansu; Shaanxi; Shanxi; Henan; Shandong; Henan (for about 15 km (9.3 mi)); Shandong — passing just south of Qingdao
36°0′N 120°18′E	Yellow Sea	
36°0′N 126°42′E	South Korea	South Chungcheong Province - North Jeolla Province Border, Passing just north of Gunsan, Iksan; North Jeolla Province-North Chungcheong Province-North Gyeongsang Province Border; North Gyeongsang Province - Passing just south of Gumi passing just north of Daegu-Palgong Mountain; North Gyeongsang Province- Passing through Pohang
36°0′N 129°35′E	Sea of Japan	
36°0′N 133°1′E	Japan	Island of Chiburi-shima: — Shimane Prefecture, Passing through the northern of Ageo, Fukui
36°0′N 133°4′E	Sea of Japan	
36°0′N 135°58′E	Japan	Island of Honshū: — Fukui Prefecture — Gifu Prefecture — Nagano Prefecture — Gunma Prefecture − for about 4 km (2.5 mi) — Saitama Prefecture — Chiba Prefecture − for about 6 km (3.7 mi) — Ibaraki Prefecture
36°0′N 140°40′E	Pacific Ocean	
36°0′N 121°30′W	United States	California; Nevada - Just South Of Las Vegas; Arizona; New Mexico; Texas; Oklahoma; Arkansas; Missouri / Arkansas border (approximate); Tennessee; North Carolina (Madison County, for about 14 km (8.7 mi)); Tennessee (Unicoi County, for about 12 km (7.5 mi)); North Carolina
36°0′N 75°39′W	Atlantic Ocean	
36°0′N 5°36′W	Strait of Gibraltar	Passing 2 m (6.6 ft) south of Punta de Tarifa, Spain - the most southerly point of the European mainland
36°0′N 5°25′W	Mediterranean Sea	

== 37th parallel north ==
37th parallel north (interactive map)

The 37th parallel north is a circle of latitude that is 37 degrees north of the Earth's equatorial plane. It crosses Europe, the Mediterranean Sea, Africa, Asia, the Pacific Ocean, North America, and the Atlantic Ocean.

At this latitude, the Sun is visible for 14 hours, 42 minutes during the summer solstice and 9 hours, 37 minutes during the winter solstice.

The 37th parallel north is roughly the northern limit of the visibility of Canopus, the second-brightest star of the night sky. Along with the 37th parallel south, it is the latitude at which solar irradiance is closest to the planetary average, with higher solar irradiance equatorward and lower poleward.

=== United States ===
The 37th parallel defining borders between states in the United States.

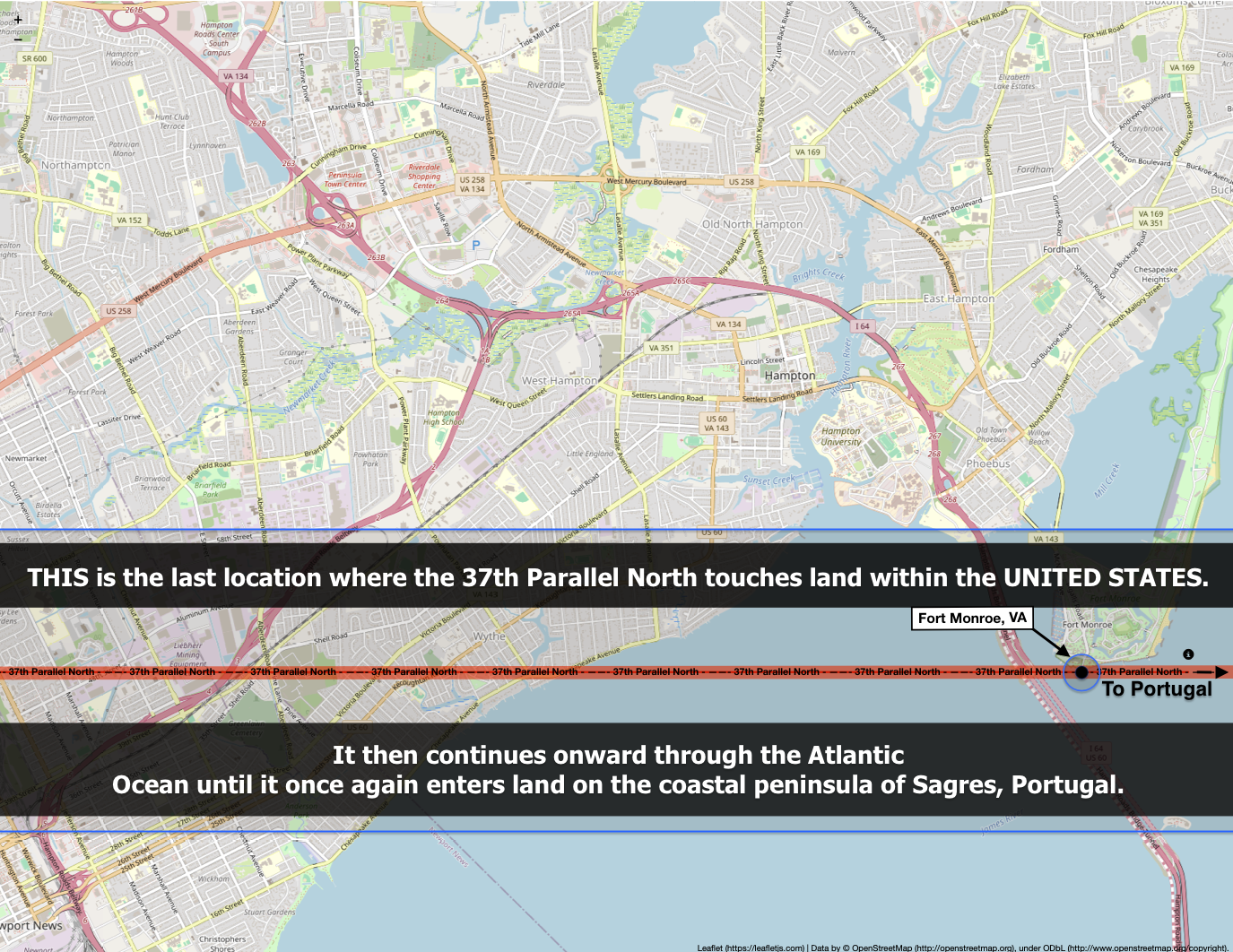
Exit Point of the 37th Parallel North from the United States.

In the United States, the parallel defines the southern borders of Utah, Colorado, and Kansas, and the northern borders of Arizona, New Mexico, and Oklahoma. It dates to the Kansas–Nebraska Act of 1854 when Congress divided Unorganized Territory into Kansas and Nebraska north of the 37th parallel and a remainder Indian Territory to the south. Before that, the line had been thought to be the boundary between the Cherokee and Osage reservations – the 2.46 miles (3.96 km) discrepancy resulting in the creation of the Cherokee Strip. Congress extended the line west to New Mexico Territory, thus defining which states and territories would constitute The South between the Colorado and Mississippi Rivers, and creating what later became the Oklahoma Panhandle.

The parallel 37° north formed the southern boundary of the historic and extralegal Territory of Jefferson.

==== U.S. Landmarks located on or in close proximity of the 37th parallel ====
- Santa Cruz, California – Located on the exact entry point into the U.S. at Bonny Doon Beach.
- Yosemite National Park — Situated in close proximity, just north of the 37th parallel.
- Death Valley – The 37th parallel runs approximately 1,300 ft south of the Little Hebe Crater rim and approximately 1,900 ft south of the larger Ubehebe Crater rim, a crater that's 800 meters (2,600 ft) wide and 235 meters (771 ft) deep.
- Area 51, Nevada — Also known as "Groom Lake".
- Four Corners, the only point where four U.S. states meet.
- Cairo, Illinois – The southernmost city in Illinois.
- Bowling Green, Kentucky
- Chesapeake Bay Bridge–Tunnel – A critical maritime and transportation structure.

=== Around the world ===
Starting at the Prime Meridian and heading eastward, the parallel 37° north passes through:

Coordinates	Country, territory or sea	Notes
37°0′N 0°0′E	Mediterranean Sea	
37°0′N 6°15′E	Algeria	
37°0′N 6°34′E	Mediterranean Sea	
37°0′N 7°15′E	Algeria	
37°0′N 7°33′E	Mediterranean Sea	
37°0′N 8°52′E	Tunisia	
37°0′N 10°11′E	Mediterranean Sea	Gulf of Tunis
37°0′N 10°53′E	Tunisia	Cap Bon
37°0′N 11°4′E	Mediterranean Sea	Strait of Sicily, passing just north of the island of Pantelleria, Italy
37°0′N 14°20′E	Italy	Island of Sicily — Province of Ragusa — Province of Siracusa
37°0′N 15°16′E	Ionian Sea	
37°0′N 21°39′E	Greece	Peloponnese (Messenia)
37°0′N 21°57′E	Ionian Sea	Messenian Gulf
37°0′N 22°09′E	Greece	Peloponnese — Messenia — Laconia
37°0′N 23°0′E	Aegean Sea	Myrtoan Sea
37°0′N 24°40′E	Greece	Island of Sifnos
37°0′N 24°44′E	Aegean Sea	
37°0′N 25°1′E	Greece	Islands of Antiparos and Paros
37°0′N 25°13′E	Aegean Sea	
37°0′N 25°23′E	Greece	Island of Naxos
37°0′N 25°34′E	Aegean Sea	
37°0′N 26°26′E	Greece	Island of Levitha
37°0′N 26°30′E	Aegean Sea	
37°0′N 26°55′E	Greece	Island of Kalymnos
37°0′N 27°3′E	Aegean Sea	
37°0′N 27°15′E	Turkey	
37°0′N 27°47′E	Aegean Sea	
37°0′N 28°13′E	Turkey	Passing through Adana and Nizip
37°0′N 40°25′E	Syria	
37°0′N 42°18′E	Iraq	
37°0′N 44°16′E	Turkey	Şemdinli district (for about 7 km (4.3 mi))
37°0′N 44°20′E	Iraq	
37°0′N 44°54′E	Iran	
37°0′N 50°32′E	Caspian Sea	
37°0′N 54°0′E	Iran	
37°0′N 60°3′E	Turkmenistan	
37°0′N 64°47′E	Afghanistan	
37°0′N 67°56′E	Tajikistan	
37°0′N 68°10′E	Afghanistan	
37°0′N 71°28′E	Tajikistan	
37°0′N 72°28′E	Afghanistan	
37°0′N 74°34′E	Pakistan	Gilgit-Baltistan - claimed by India
37°0′N 74°50′E	China	Xinjiang - for about 14 km (8.7 mi)
37°0′N 75°0′E	Pakistan	Gilgit-Baltistan - for about 14 km (8.7 mi), claimed by India
37°0′N 75°9′E	China	Xinjiang; Qinghai; Gansu; Ningxia; Gansu; Shaanxi; Shanxi; Hebei; Shandong - Passing through Yantai
37°0′N 122°32′E	Yellow Sea	Asan Bay
37°0′N 126°20′E	South Korea	South Chungcheong Province; Gyeonggi Province - passing through Pyeongtaek, Anseong; North Chungcheong Province - passing just north of Chungju; North Gyeongsang Province
37°0′N 129°25′E	Sea of Japan	
37°0′N 136°46′E	Japan	Island of Honshū: — Ishikawa Prefecture
37°0′N 137°3′E	Sea of Japan	Toyama Bay
37°0′N 137°42′E	Japan	Island of Honshū: — Niigata Prefecture — Nagano Prefecture — Niigata Prefecture — Gunma Prefecture − for around 10 km (6.2 mi) — Niigata Prefecture − for around 7 km (4.3 mi) — Fukushima Prefecture — Tochigi Prefecture — Ibaraki Prefecture — Fukushima Prefecture
37°0′N 140°59′E	Pacific Ocean	
37°0′N 122°11′W	United States	California - landfall at Bonny Doon Beach just north of Santa Cruz and falling in Fresno; Nevada - Falling South of Alamo and Gold Point; Utah / Arizona border Colorado / New Mexico border Colorado / Oklahoma border Kansas / Oklahoma border Missouri; Illinois (at its southernmost point); Kentucky - passing through Bowling Green and just south of Paducah; Virginia - passing through Chesapeake Bay Bridge–Tunnel (specifically, the bridge between the two tunnels)
37°0′N 76°18′W	Atlantic Ocean	
37°0′N 25°10′W	Portugal	Santa Maria Island in the Azores
37°0′N 25°3′W	Atlantic Ocean	
37°0′N 8°57′W	Portugal	Sagres Point
37°0′N 8°56′W	Atlantic Ocean	
37°0′N 7°59′W	Portugal	Cape Santa Maria
37°0′N 7°50′W	Atlantic Ocean	Gulf of Cádiz
37°0′N 6°32′W	Spain	
37°0′N 1°53′W	Mediterranean Sea	

== 38th parallel north ==
38th parallel north (interactive map)

The 38th parallel north is a circle of latitude that is 38 degrees north of the Earth's equatorial plane. It crosses Europe, the Mediterranean Sea, Asia, the Pacific Ocean, North America, and the Atlantic Ocean. The 38th parallel north formed the border between North and South Korea prior to the Korean War.

At this latitude, the Sun is visible for 14 hours, 48 minutes during the summer solstice and 9 hours, 32 minutes during the winter solstice.

=== Korea ===
- 38th parallel north
- The Korean Peninsula first divided along the 38th parallel, later along the demarcation line

38th parallel north
- Hangul: 삼팔선
- Hanja: 三八線
- RR: Sampalseon
- MR: Samp'alsŏn

From 1910 to 1945, Korea was ruled by the Empire of Japan as a colony. On 11 August 1945, as World War II drew to a close, U.S. military officials in Washington "chose an invisible line across Korea, the 38th Parallel, for dividing the former Japanese colony into Soviet and American zones, north and south.” After Japan surrendered in August 1945, the 38th parallel was established as the boundary between Soviet and American occupation zones, marking the beginning of Soviet and American command of what is known today as North and South Korea, respectively. This parallel divided the Korean peninsula roughly in the middle. In 1948, this parallel became the boundary between the Democratic People's Republic of Korea (North Korea) and the Republic of Korea (South Korea), both of which claim to be the government of the whole of Korea.

On 25 June 1950, after a series of cross-border raids and gunfire from both the Northern and the Southern sides, the North Korean Army crossed the 38th parallel and invaded South Korea. This sparked UN Security Council Resolution 82 which called for the North to return its troops to behind the 38th parallel, commencing the Korean War with United Nations troops (mostly American) — the United Nations Command — helping South Korean troops to defend South Korea from “Communist aggression".

After the Armistice agreement was signed on July 27, 1953, a new line was established to separate North Korea and South Korea. This Military Demarcation Line is surrounded by a Demilitarized Zone (DMZ). The demarcation line crosses the 38th parallel, from the southwest to the northeast.

=== Around the world ===
Starting at the Prime Meridian heading eastward, the 38th parallel north passes through:

Coordinates	Country, territory or sea	Notes
38°0′N 0°0′E	Mediterranean Sea	Passing just north of the island of Marettimo, Italy (at 37°59′43″N 12°1′47″E)
38°0′N 12°19′E	Italy	Islands of Levanzo and Sicily
38°0′N 15°25′E	Mediterranean Sea	Strait of Messina
38°0′N 15°38′E	Italy	Passing through Reggio di Calabria (southern suburbs)
38°0′N 16°8′E	Mediterranean Sea	Ionian Sea - passing between the islands of Kefalonia (at 38°4′N 20°43′E) and Zakynthos (at 37°56′N 20°42′E), Greece
38°0′N 21°16′E	Greece	Passing through Athens
38°0′N 24°2′E	Aegean Sea	
38°0′N 24°14′E	Greece	Islands of Petalioi and Euboea
38°0′N 24°34′E	Aegean Sea	Passing just north of the island of Andros (at 37°59′57″N 24°47′23″E), Greece
38°0′N 27°7′E	Turkey	Passing through Konya, Niğde and İzmir (southern suburbs)
38°0′N 44°17′E	Iran	Passing just south of Tabriz
38°0′N 48°55′E	Caspian Sea	
38°0′N 53°49′E	Turkmenistan	
38°0′N 55°17′E	Iran	
38°0′N 57°22′E	Turkmenistan	Passing just north of Ashgabat
38°0′N 66°38′E	Uzbekistan	
38°0′N 68°17′E	Tajikistan	
38°0′N 70°19′E	Afghanistan	
38°0′N 71°16′E	Tajikistan	
38°0′N 74°54′E	China	Xinjiang; Qinghai; Gansu; Inner Mongolia; Ningxia; Inner Mongolia; Shaanxi − for around 5 km (3.1 mi); Inner Mongolia − for around 14 km (8.7 mi); Shaanxi; Shanxi — passing just north of Taiyuan; Hebei — passing just south of Shijiazhuang; Shandong
38°0′N 118°58′E	Yellow Sea	Passing just north of Baengnyeongdo (at 37°59′N 124°41′E), South Korea
38°0′N 125°7′E	North Korea	Ongjin Peninsula — South Hwanghae Province
38°0′N 125°35′E	Yellow Sea	Ongjin Bay
38°0′N 125°46′E	North Korea	South Hwanghae Province passing just south of Haeju; North Hwanghae Province passing just north of Kaesong
38°0′N 126°49′E	South Korea	Gyeonggi Province- Passing through Paju, Yeoncheon County, Pocheon, Gapyeong County; Gangwon Province - Passing through Hwacheon County, Chuncheon, (passing just north of Soyang Reservoir), Inje County, Yangyang County
38°0′N 128°44′E	Sea of Japan	
38°0′N 138°14′E	Japan	Island of Sado: — Niigata Prefecture
38°0′N 138°33′E	Sea of Japan	
38°0′N 139°14′E	Japan	Island of Honshū: — Niigata Prefecture; Passing just north of Niigata City — Yamagata Prefecture — Miyagi Prefecture
38°0′N 140°55′E	Pacific Ocean	
38°0′N 123°1′W	United States	California - passing through Pinole and Stockton With Sacramento a little to the north Nevada - passing just south of Tonopah; Utah - passing through Capitol Reef and Canyonlands National Parks; Colorado - passing through Ouray, and then just south of Pueblo; Kansas - passing just south of Newton; Missouri - passing through Camdenton and just north of Rolla; Illinois - passing just south of Mount Vernon; Indiana - passing through Evansville; Kentucky - passing through Lexington; West Virginia - passing just north of Beckley; Virginia - passing just south of Charlottesville
38°0′N 76°28′W	Chesapeake Bay	
38°0′N 75°53′W	United States	Maryland - passing just north of Smith Island and Crisfield; Virginia - passing just north of Chincoteague
38°0′N 75°16′W	Atlantic Ocean	Passing between Pico (at 38°23′N 28°14′W) and São Miguel (at 37°55′N 25°47′W) islands, Azores, Portugal
38°0′N 8°51′W	Portugal	Setúbal District; Beja District - passing just south of Beja
38°0′N 7°12′W	Spain	Andalusia; Extremadura; Region of Murcia - passing just north of Murcia; Valencian Community
38°0′N 0°39′W	Mediterranean Sea	

== 39th parallel north ==
39th parallel north (interactive map)

The 39th parallel north is a circle of latitude that is 39 degrees north of the Earth's equatorial plane. It crosses Europe, the Mediterranean Sea, Asia, the Pacific Ocean, North America, and the Atlantic Ocean.

At this latitude the sun is visible for 14 hours, 54 minutes during the summer solstice and 9 hours, 26 minutes during the winter solstice.

Daylight along the 39th parallel north falls under 10 hours a day starting on 18 November and returns to over ten hours a day beginning 24 January.

In the United States, the eastern boundary of the state of California was defined as following the 120th meridian west south from the 42nd parallel north to its intersection with the 39th parallel north, beyond which it follows a diagonal line to where the Colorado River crosses the 35th parallel north. The intersection of the 120th meridian and 39th parallel is in Lake Tahoe.

=== Around the world ===
Starting at the Prime Meridian and heading eastwards, the parallel 39° north passes through:

Coordinates	Country, territory or sea	Notes
39°0′N 0°0′E	Mediterranean Sea	
39°0′N 1°17′E	Spain	Island of Ibiza
39°0′N 1°35′E	Mediterranean Sea	Passing just south of the island of Cabrera, Spain
39°0′N 8°23′E	Italy	Islands of Sant'Antioco and Sardinia
39°0′N 9°1′E	Mediterranean Sea	Tyrrhenian Sea - passing just north of the island of Stromboli, Italy
39°0′N 16°8′E	Italy	
39°0′N 17°10′E	Mediterranean Sea	Ionian Sea
39°0′N 20°42′E	Greece	Mainland and island of Euboea
39°0′N 23°22′E	Aegean Sea	Passing just north of the island of Skyros, Greece
39°0′N 26°17′E	Greece	Island of Lesbos
39°0′N 26°32′E	Aegean Sea	
39°0′N 26°48′E	Turkey	
39°0′N 44°11′E	Iran	
39°0′N 45°26′E	Azerbaijan	Nakhchivan exclave
39°0′N 46°6′E	Armenia	
39°0′N 46°31′E	Azerbaijan	
39°0′N 46°41′E	Iran	
39°0′N 48°21′E	Azerbaijan	
39°0′N 49°11′E	Caspian Sea	
39°0′N 53°2′E	Turkmenistan	Island of Ogurja Ada
39°0′N 53°3′E	Caspian Sea	
39°0′N 53°53′E	Turkmenistan	Passing just south of Türkmenabat
39°0′N 64°6′E	Uzbekistan	
39°0′N 68°7′E	Tajikistan	
39°0′N 73°49′E	China	Xinjiang; Qinghai; Gansu; Qinghai; Gansu; Qinghai (for about 7 km); Gansu (for about 30 km); Qinghai (for about 17 km); Gansu; Inner Mongolia (for about 16 km); Gansu (for about 6 km); Inner Mongolia; Gansu; Inner Mongolia; Ningxia; Inner Mongolia; Shaanxi; Shanxi; Hebei; Tianjin (just south of the city centre)
39°0′N 117°46′E	Yellow Sea	Bohai Gulf
39°0′N 121°19′E	China	Liaoning (Liaodong Peninsula) — passing just north of Dalian
39°0′N 121°51′E	Yellow Sea	Passing just south of Zhangzi Island and Haiyang Island
39°0′N 125°12′E	North Korea	Pyongyang
39°0′N 127°50′E	Sea of Japan	
39°0′N 139°51′E	Japan	Island of Honshū: — Yamagata Prefecture — Akita Prefecture — Iwate Prefecture — Miyagi Prefecture − for about 1 km — Iwate Prefecture
39°0′N 141°44′E	Pacific Ocean	
39°0′N 123°42′W	United States	California; Nevada - passing through Great Basin National Park; Utah; Colorado - passing just south of Grand Junction; Kansas - passing just south of Topeka; Missouri - passing just south of Kansas City; Illinois; Indiana; Kentucky; Ohio - passing just south of Cincinnati; West Virginia; Virginia; Maryland - less than a mile north of District of Columbia at 39°0′N 77°2′W; cutting through the Chesapeake Bay Bridge at 39°0′N 76°22′W; Delaware
39°0′N 75°20′W	Delaware Bay	
39°0′N 74°57′W	United States	New Jersey - passing through Cape May Airport
39°0′N 74°47′W	Atlantic Ocean	Passing between the islands of Graciosa (almost crossing its southern tip) and São Jorge, Azores, Portugal
39°0′N 9°25′W	Portugal	Passing about 30 km north of Lisbon
39°0′N 6°58′W	Spain	Passing through Ciudad Real and Albacete
39°0′N 0°9′W	Mediterranean Sea	

== 40th parallel north ==
40th parallel north (interactive map)

The 40th parallel north is a circle of latitude that is 40 degrees north of the Earth's equatorial plane. It crosses Europe, the Mediterranean Sea, Asia, the Pacific Ocean, North America, and the Atlantic Ocean.

At this latitude the sun is visible for 15 hours, 1 minute and 28 seconds during the summer solstice and 9 hours, 20 minutes during the winter solstice. On 21 June, the maximum altitude of the sun is 73.44 degrees, while it is 26.56 degrees on 21 December.

The maximum altitude of the Sun is > 35.00º in October and > 28.00º in November.

The 40th parallel north is the southern baseline for Canada's National Topographic System.

=== United States ===
The 40th parallel defines the state line between Nebraska and Kansas

Survey marker on the Kansas/Nebraska state line

The parallel 40° north formed the boundary between the Kansas and Nebraska territories, as per the Kansas–Nebraska Act of 1854. It remains the boundary between the modern states of Kansas and Nebraska.

The parallel 40° north formed the original northern boundary of the British Colony of Maryland. A subsequent royal grant gave the Colony of Pennsylvania land north of the 40th parallel but mistakenly assumed it would intersect the Twelve Mile Circle, which it does not. Pennsylvania's border was thus unclear and the colony pushed for a border far south of the 40th parallel. The Mason–Dixon line was drawn between 1763 and 1767 as the compromise boundary between the overlapping claims of these two colonies.

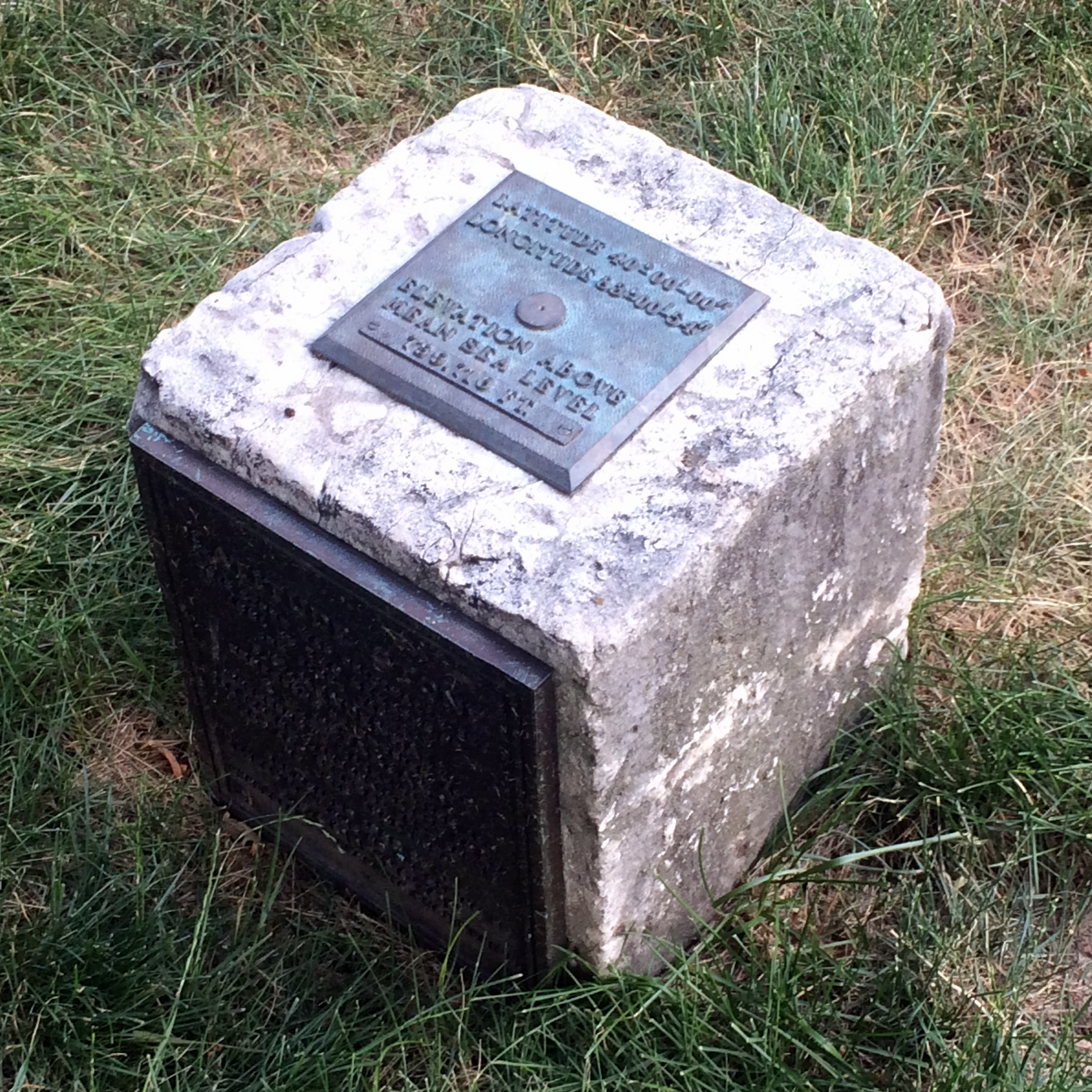
40th parallel marker at Ohio State University (Columbus, Ohio)

The parallel 40° north passes through the cities of Philadelphia, Pennsylvania, Boulder, Colorado, and Columbus, Ohio; as well as northern suburbs of Indianapolis, Indiana and the southern suburbs of Pittsburgh, Pennsylvania. The parallel goes directly through the John Glenn Columbus International Airport, with runway 10L-28R lying immediately north of the line, runway 10R-28L lying slightly south of it, and the line going through the northernmost edges of the terminal. It also passes through the main campus of The Ohio State University; specifically, it cuts directly across the Oval greenspace, between University Hall and the William Oxley Thompson Memorial Library. Ohio Stadium, one of the largest stadiums in the world, barely misses the parallel 40° north (6 seconds or 185 metres (607 ft) above 40° north).

Baseline Road in Boulder, Colorado, traces the parallel 40° north.

Thistle, Utah, a ghost town since 1983, is slightly (30 seconds or 956 metres (0.594 mi)) below 40° north.

=== Japan ===
==== Gallery ====
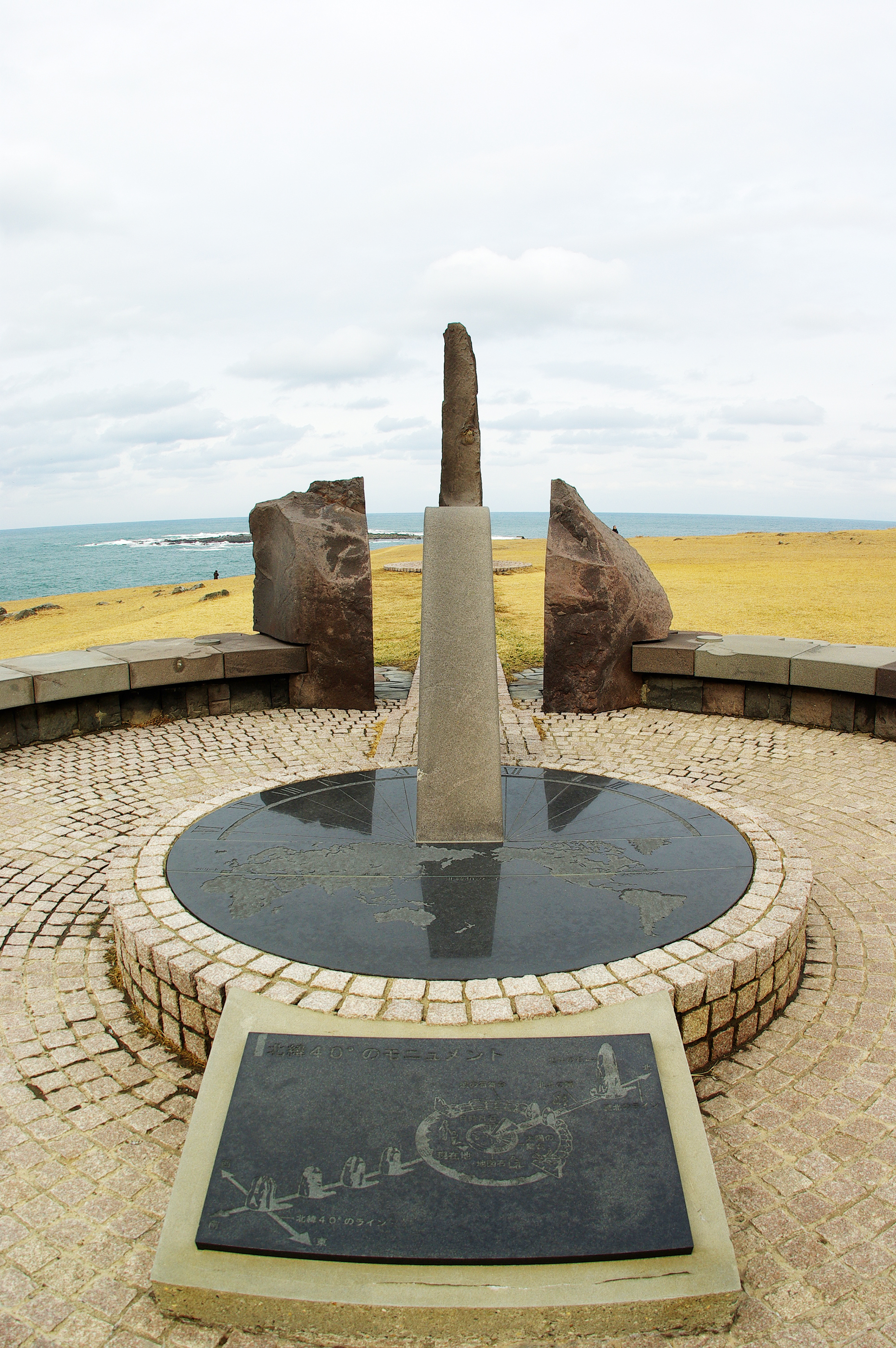
Monument of North latitude 40 degrees at Nyudouzaki in Oga, Akita

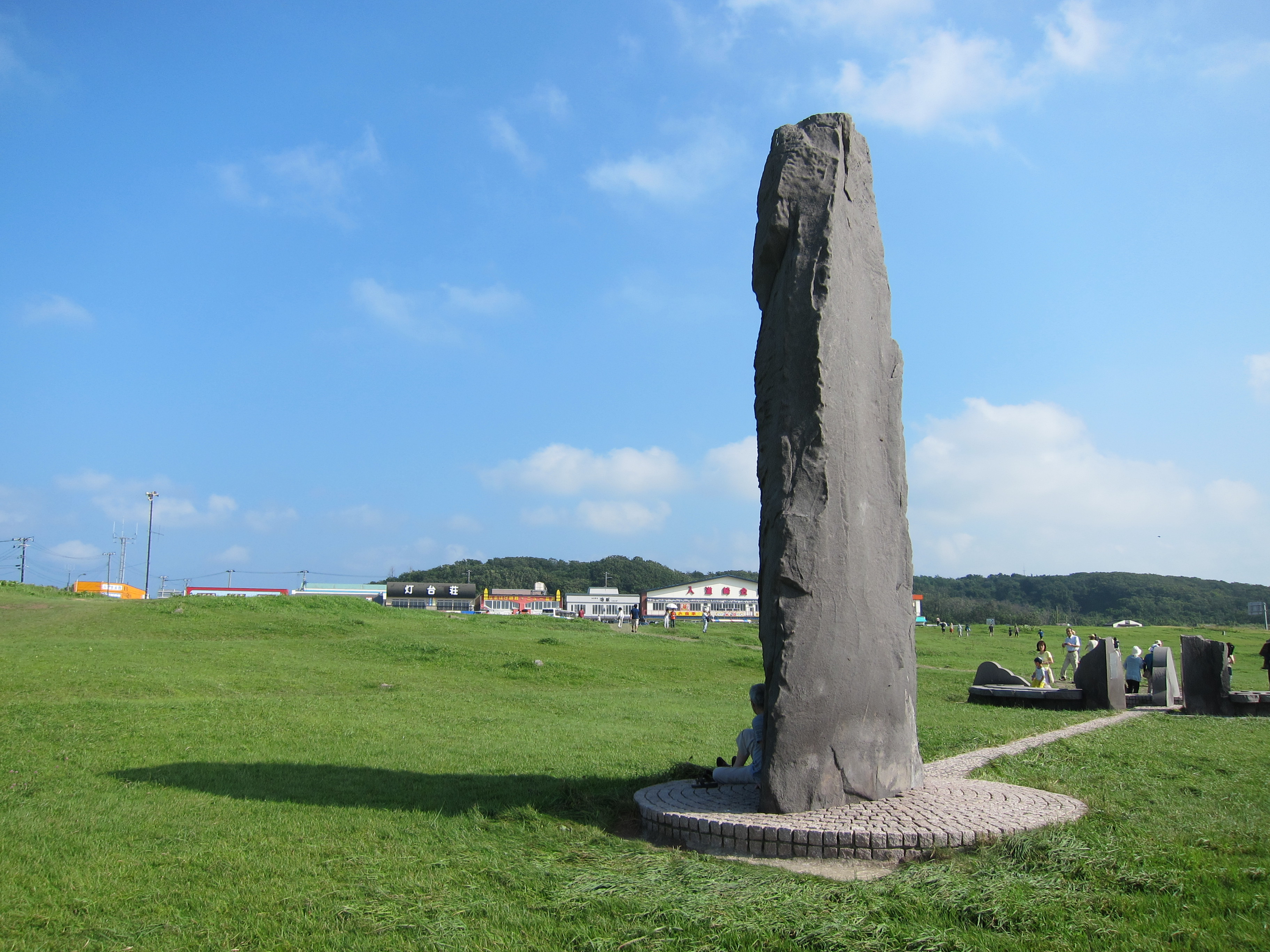
Nyudozaki Monument

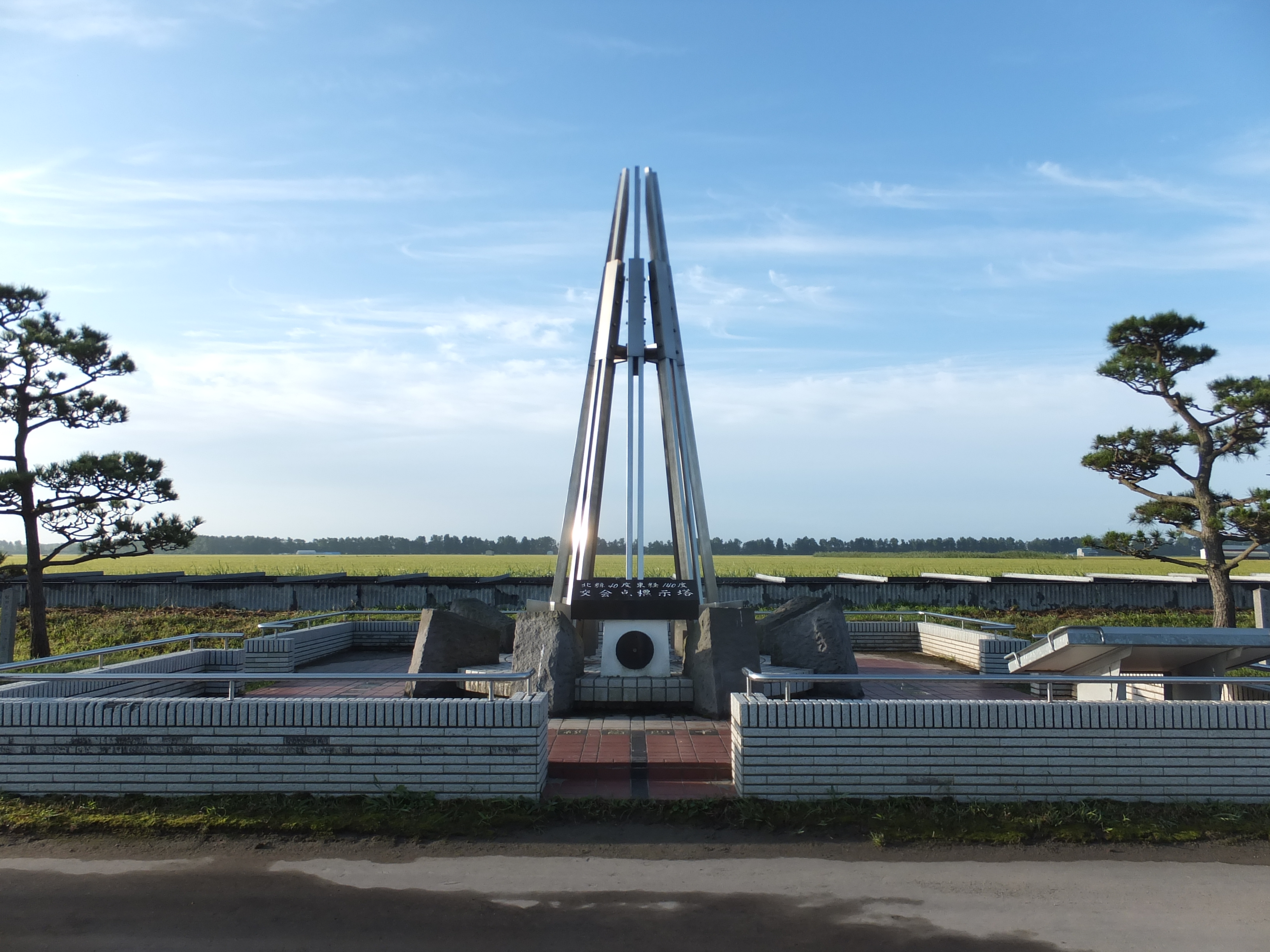
40°N and 140°E Crossing Point in Ogata, Akita

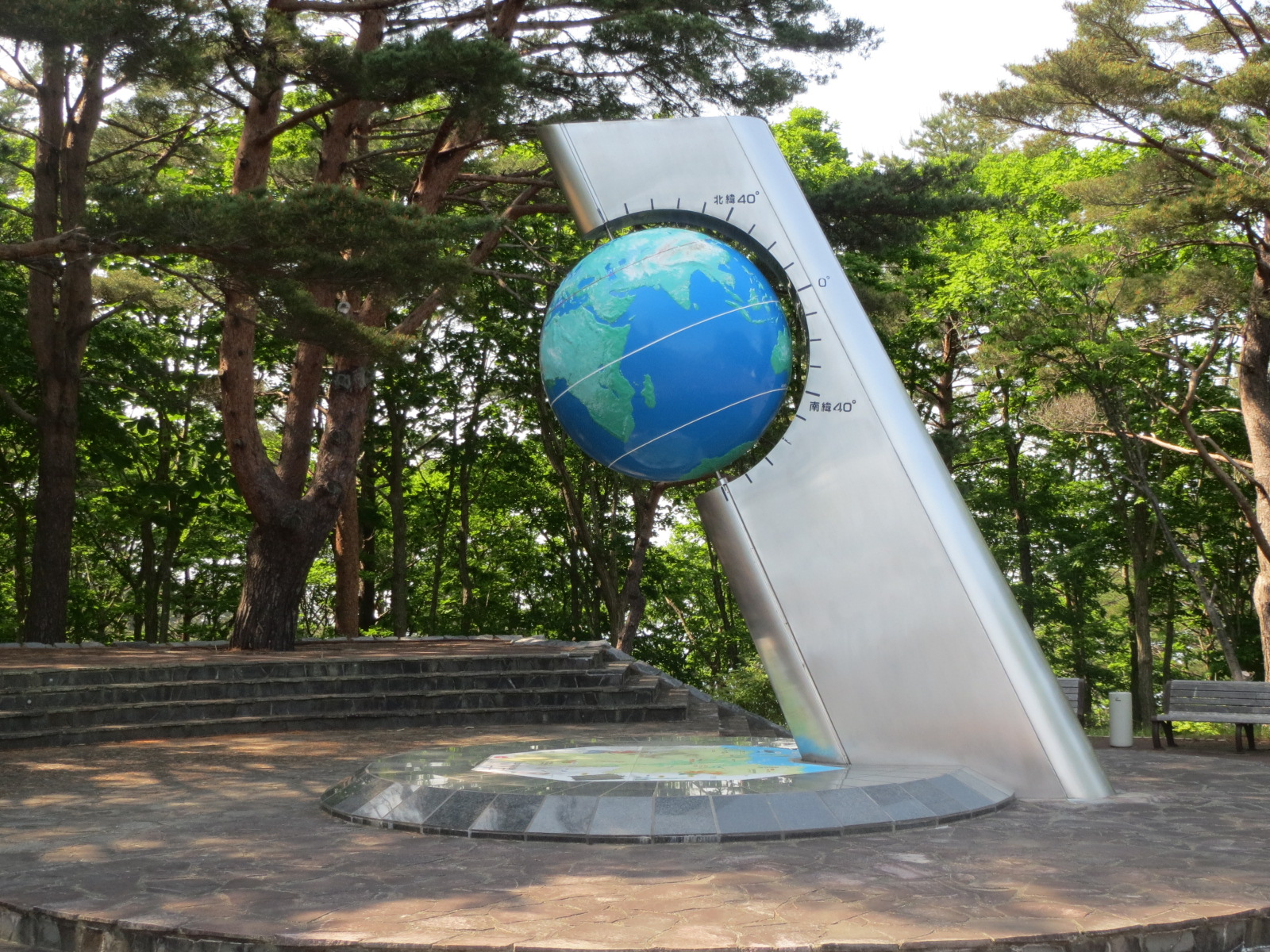
Globe Monument in Fudai, Iwate

=== Around the world ===
Starting in Spain at the Prime Meridian and heading eastwards, the parallel 40° north passes through:

Coordinates	Country, territory or sea	Notes
40°0′N 0°0′E	Spain	Valencian Community
40°0′N 0°2′E	Mediterranean Sea	Passing just north of the island of Majorca, Spain
40°0′N 3°48′E	Spain	Island of Menorca
40°0′N 4°13′E	Mediterranean Sea	
40°0′N 8°24′E	Italy	Island of Sardinia
40°0′N 9°42′E	Mediterranean Sea	Tyrrhenian Sea
40°0′N 15°20′E	Italy	Campania
40°0′N 15°26′E	Mediterranean Sea	Gulf of Policastro
40°0′N 15°41′E	Italy	Basilicata, Calabria
40°0′N 16°37′E	Mediterranean Sea	Gulf of Taranto
40°0′N 18°0′E	Italy	Apulia
40°0′N 18°25′E	Mediterranean Sea	Strait of Otranto
40°0′N 19°53′E	Albania	Passing just north of Sarandë and just south of Gjirokastër
40°0′N 20°23′E	Greece	
40°0′N 22°37′E	Mediterranean Sea	Aegean Sea
40°0′N 23°23′E	Greece	Kassandra and Sithonia
40°0′N 24°0′E	Mediterranean Sea	Aegean Sea
40°0′N 25°6′E	Greece	Island of Lemnos
40°0′N 25°26′E	Mediterranean Sea	Aegean Sea
40°0′N 26°11′E	Turkey	Passing just north of Ankara
40°0′N 44°24′E	Armenia	Passing through Verin Artashat and Norashen, Ararat
40°0′N 45°36′E	Azerbaijan	Passing through Karabakh and Kur-Araz Lowland
40°0′N 49°27′E	Caspian Sea	
40°0′N 52°46′E	Turkmenistan	
40°0′N 62°26′E	Uzbekistan	
40°0′N 68°48′E	Tajikistan	
40°0′N 69°31′E	Kyrgyzstan	
40°0′N 70°32′E	Tajikistan	For about 9 km (5.6 mi)
40°0′N 70°39′E	Kyrgyzstan	
40°0′N 71°5′E	Uzbekistan	Sokh exclave - for about 7 km (4.3 mi)
40°0′N 71°10′E	Kyrgyzstan	
40°0′N 71°48′E	Uzbekistan	Shohimardon exclave - for about 4 km (2.5 mi)
40°0′N 71°50′E	Kyrgyzstan	
40°0′N 73°58′E	China	Xinjiang; Gansu; Inner Mongolia; Shanxi; Hebei; Beijing (passing just north of the city centre); Hebei; Tianjin; Hebei; Liaoning (for about 8 km (5.0 mi))
40°0′N 119°54′E	Pacific Ocean	Liaodong Bay, Yellow Sea
40°0′N 121°53′E	China	Liaoning (Liaodong Peninsula)
40°0′N 124°21′E	North Korea	North Pyeongan Province - Passing through Sinuiju; Jagang Province; South Hamgyeong Province - Passing just north of Hamheung
40°0′N 127°57′E	Pacific Ocean	Sea of Japan
40°0′N 128°10′E	North Korea	Mayang Island
40°0′N 128°13′E	Pacific Ocean	Sea of Japan
40°0′N 139°54′E	Japan	Island of Honshū — Akita Prefecture — Iwate Prefecture
40°0′N 141°57′E	Pacific Ocean	
40°0′N 124°1′W	United States	California - passing 2.35 km (1.46 mi) south of Shelter Cove; Nevada; Utah; Colorado - passing through Boulder; Nebraska / Kansas border Missouri; Illinois; Indiana - passing through Hoosier Hill, the state high point Ohio - passing through Columbus; West Virginia; Pennsylvania - passing through Philadelphia; New Jersey - passing through Toms River
40°0′N 31°7′W	Atlantic Ocean	Passing just north of Corvo Island, Azores, Portugal
40°0′N 8°55′W	Portugal	Passing near Figueira da Foz and Coimbra
40°0′N 6°51′W	Spain	Extremadura; Castile-La Mancha; Community of Madrid - for about 10 km (6.2 mi); Castile-La Mancha; Valencian Community - Rincón de Ademuz exclave, for about 4 km (2.5 mi); Castile-La Mancha - for about 5 km (3.1 mi); Aragon; Valencian Community

=== Notable cities and towns on 40°N ===
- Ankara, Turkey
- Beijing, China
- Columbus, Ohio, United States
- Boulder, Colorado, United States
- Madrid, Spain
- Naples, Italy
- Philadelphia, Pennsylvania, United States
- Yerevan, Armenia

== See also ==
- Circles of latitude between the 30th parallel north and the 35th parallel north
- Circles of latitude between the 40th parallel north and the 45th parallel north
- Baseline (surveying)
- Geological Exploration of the Fortieth Parallel
- Parallel 36°30′ north
- 38th parallel structures, series of circular depressions roughly on the 38th parallel north
- 17th parallel north, similar line dividing North and South Vietnam
