= Nedzhirlu =

Nedzhirlu may refer to:

- Nerkin Nedzhirlu, Armenia
- Verin Nedzhirlu, Armenia
