= Dzorak =

Dzorak may refer to several places:

- Dzorak, Syunik, a village in Syunik, Armenia
- Zorak, Armenia, municipality in Ararat Province, Armenia
