= Chimankend =

Village in Ararat, Armenia

Chimankend.
- Location within Armenia Location within Ararat
- Coordinates: 39°55′N 44°49′E
- Country: Armenia
- Marz (Province): Ararat
- Time zone: UTC+4 ( )

Chimankend (also, Nizhniy Karabaglyar and Nerkin Karabakhlar) is a former village in the Ararat Province of Armenia, currently part of the rural municipality of Urtsadzor village.
