= Hayanist =

Hayanist Հայանիստ
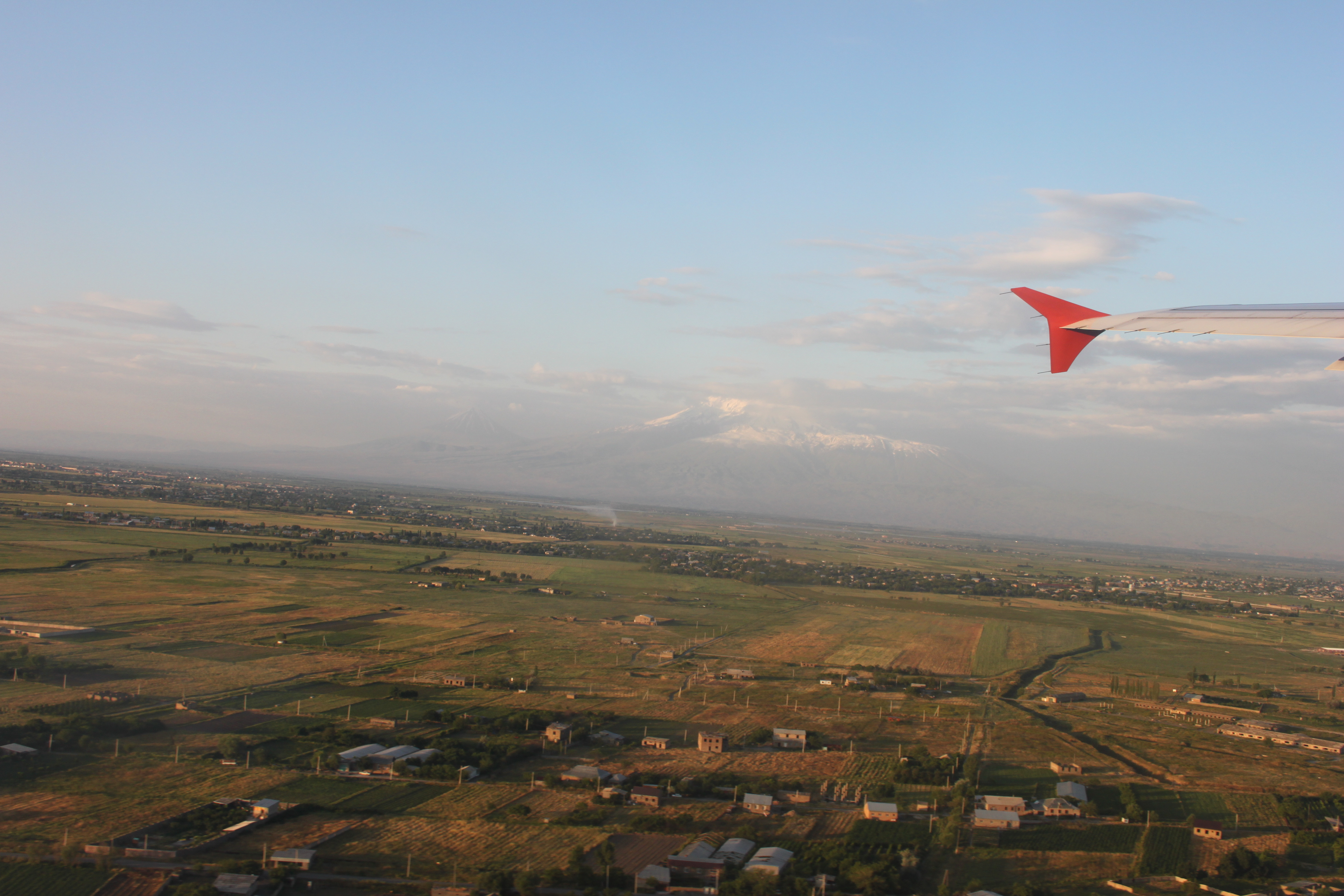
- Hayanist as seen from the air in the background

- Location within Armenia Location within Ararat
- Coordinates: 40°07′11″N 44°22′39″E
- Country: Armenia
- Province: Ararat
- Municipality: Masis

Population (2011)
  - Total: 2,117
- Time zone: UTC+4
  - Summer (DST): UTC+5

Hayanist (Armenian: Հայանիստ) is a village in the Masis Municipality of the Ararat Province of Armenia. The distance from Yerevan is 15.4 km. Despite the favourable location of the community (proximity to Yerevan and abundance of good agricultural land), most households cannot provide for their living and heads of families often chose the labour migration as the only solution of their problems. Around 160 hectares of the community's agricultural land are not irrigated.

== Etymology ==
The village was originally known as Gharaghshlar, Gharaghshlagh, or Kara-Kishlak (Armenian: Ղարաղշլաղ, romanized: Ġaraġšlaġ; Russian: Каракишляг, romanized: Karakishlyag; Azerbaijani: Qaraqışlaq), meaning black kishlak. In 1978, the village was renamed Dostlug or Dostlugh (Dostluq, meaning "friendship"); finally, it received the name Hayanist in 1991 following the exodus of its Azerbaijani population.

== History ==
Hayanist, then known as Kara-Kishlak, was part of the Erivan uezd of the Erivan Governorate within the Russian Empire. Bournoutian presents the statistics of the village in the early 20th century as follows:

Ownership	Private
Inhabited space	10.3 desyatinas (0.11 sq km)
Orrigated plowed fields	209 desyatinas (2.28 sq km)
Unirrigated fodder fields	4.75 desyatinas (0.05 sq km)
Total land	224.5 desyatinas (2.45 sq km)
Total households	110 (All Tatar (Note: Before 1918, Azerbaijanis were generally known as "Tatars". This term, employed by the Russians, referred to Turkic-speaking Muslims of the South Caucasus. After 1918, with the establishment of the Azerbaijan Democratic Republic and "especially during the Soviet era", the Tatar group identified itself as "Azerbaijani".))
Total income	8,414.65 rubles
Total land taxes	655.78 rubles
Army tax	142.29 rubles
Upkeep of officials	456.87 rubles
Total revenue	1,254.94 rubles
Large livestock	176
Units of water used for irrigation	8

In 1988–1989, the village's Azerbaijani population was exchanged with Armenians from Azerbaijan during the tensions of the Nagorno-Karabakh conflict.

== Demographics ==
The population of Hayanist since 1831 is as follows:

Year	Population	Note
1831	151	100% Muslim
1873	735	100% Tatar
1886	751	100% Tatar
1897	1,007	100% Muslim
1904	832	
1914	1,123	Mainly Tatar
1916	1,052	
1919	0	
1922	537	514 Turks, 23 Armenians
1926	754	753 Turks, 1 Armenian; 398 men
1931	850	100% Turkish
1959	1,179	
1970	1,843	
1979	1,896	
2001	2,144	
2011	2,117	

== Bibliography ==
- Bournoutian, George A. (2018). Armenia and Imperial Decline: The Yerevan Province, 1900–1914. Milton Park, Abingdon, Oxon: Routledge. ISBN 978-1-351-06260-2. OCLC 1037283914.
- Hovannisian, Richard G. (1996a). The Republic of Armenia. Vol. 3: From London to Sèvres, February–August 1920. Berkeley: University of California Press. ISBN 978-0520088030.
- Tsutsiev, Arthur (2014). Atlas of the Ethno-Political History of the Caucasus (PDF). Translated by Nora Seligman Favorov. New Haven: Yale University Press. ISBN 9780300153088. Archived (PDF) from the original on 17 June 2023.
