= Lanjar =

Lanjar Լանջառ
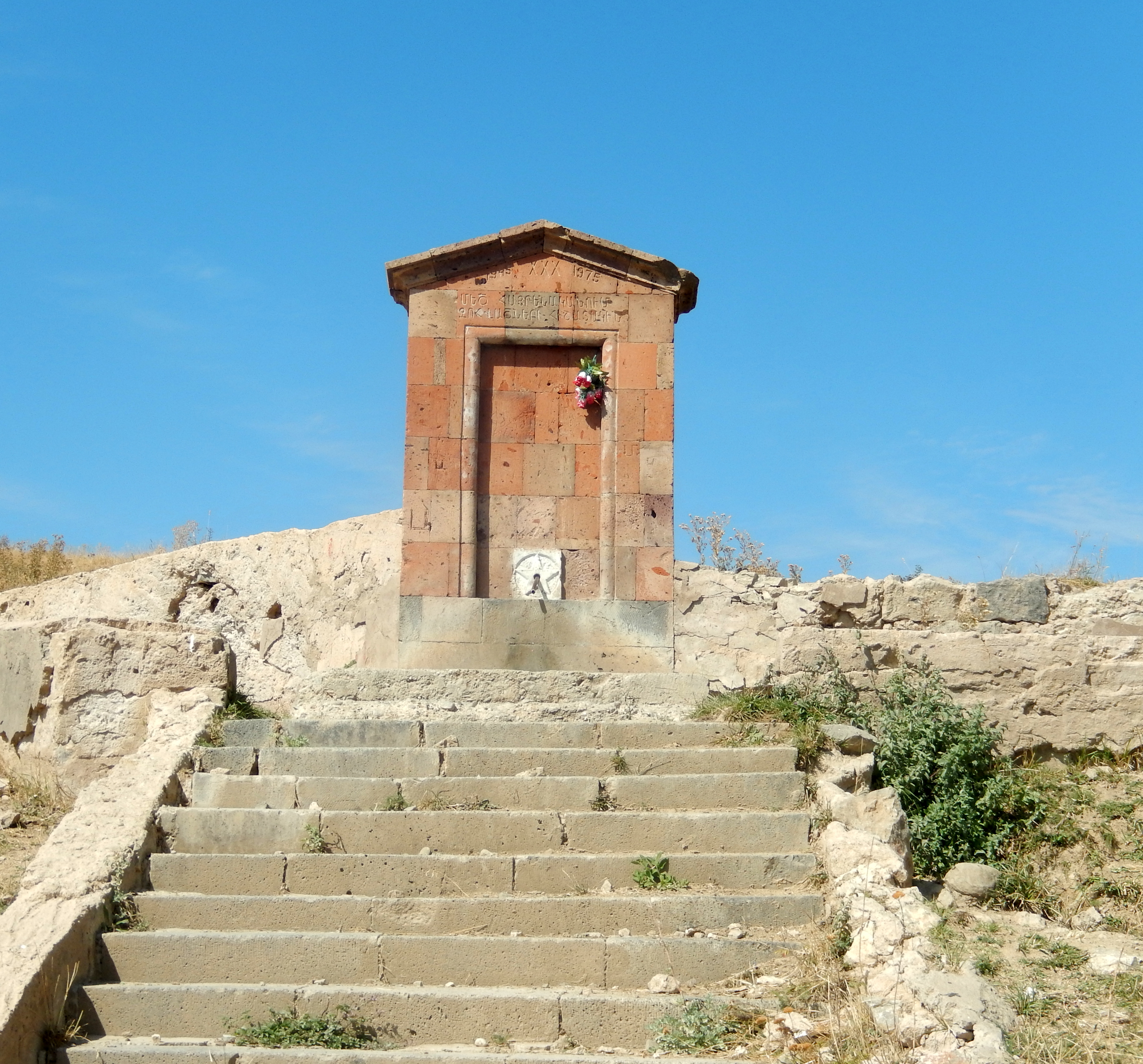
- Հուշաղբյուր Երկրորդ աշխարհամարտում զոհվածներին, Լանջառ

- Location within Armenia Location within Ararat
- Coordinates: 39°49′30″N 44°59′00″E
- Country: Armenia
- Province: Ararat
- Municipality: Ararat

Population (2011)
  - Total: 204
- Time zone: UTC+4
  - Summer (DST): UTC+5

Lanjar (Armenian: Լանջառ) is a village in the Ararat Municipality of the Ararat Province of Armenia.
