= Shaghap =

Village in Ararat, Armenia

Shaghap Շաղափ
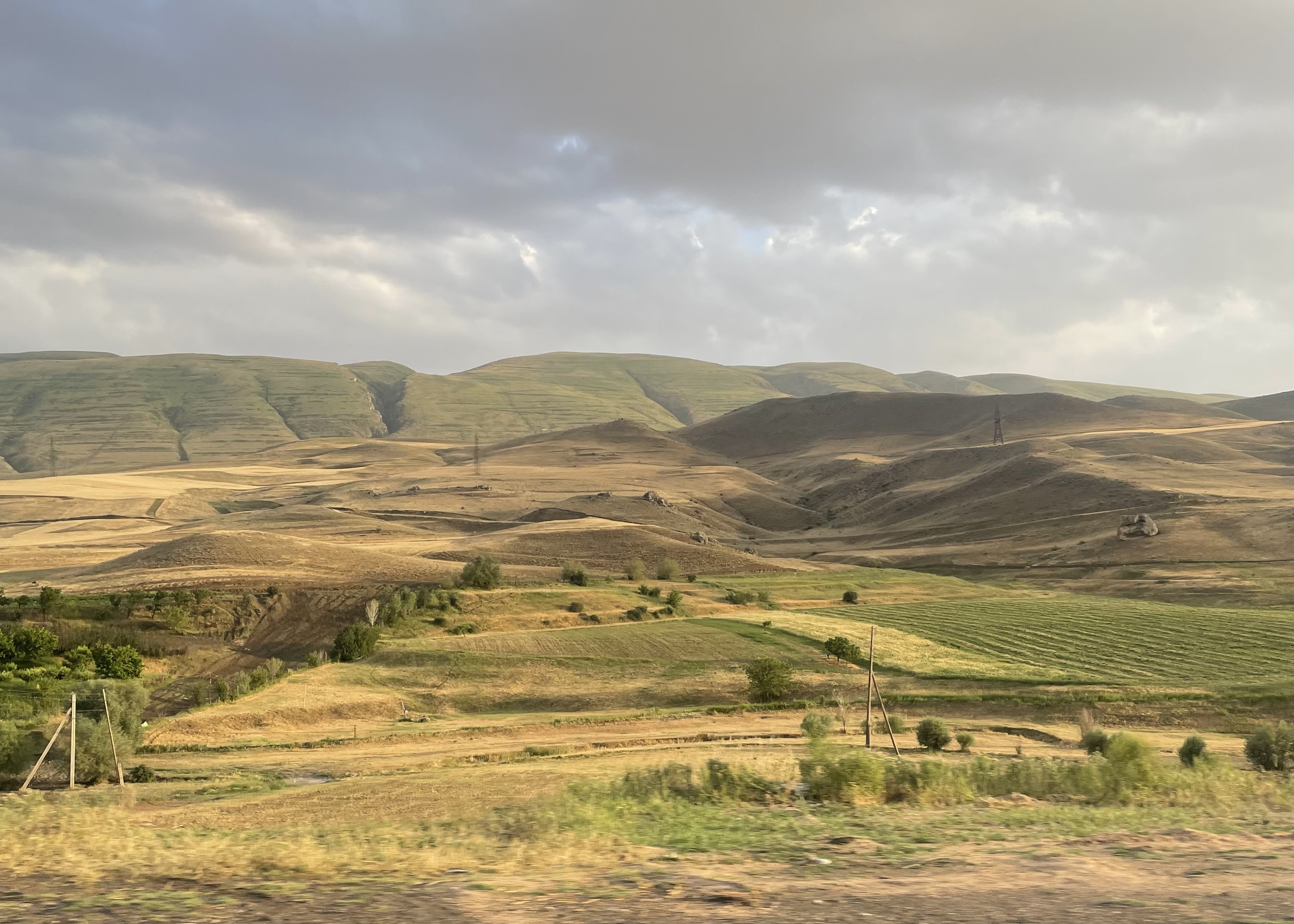
- Mountains near Shaghap

- Location within Armenia Location within Ararat
- Coordinates: 39°52′N 44°54′E
- Country: Armenia
- Province: Ararat
- Municipality: Vedi
- Elevation: 1,300 m (4,300 ft)

Population (2011)
  - Total: 913
- Time zone: UTC+4
  - Summer (DST): UTC+5

Shaghap (Armenian: Շաղափ) is a village in the Vedi Municipality of the Ararat Province of Armenia.
