= Mrgavan =

Mrgavan Մրգավան
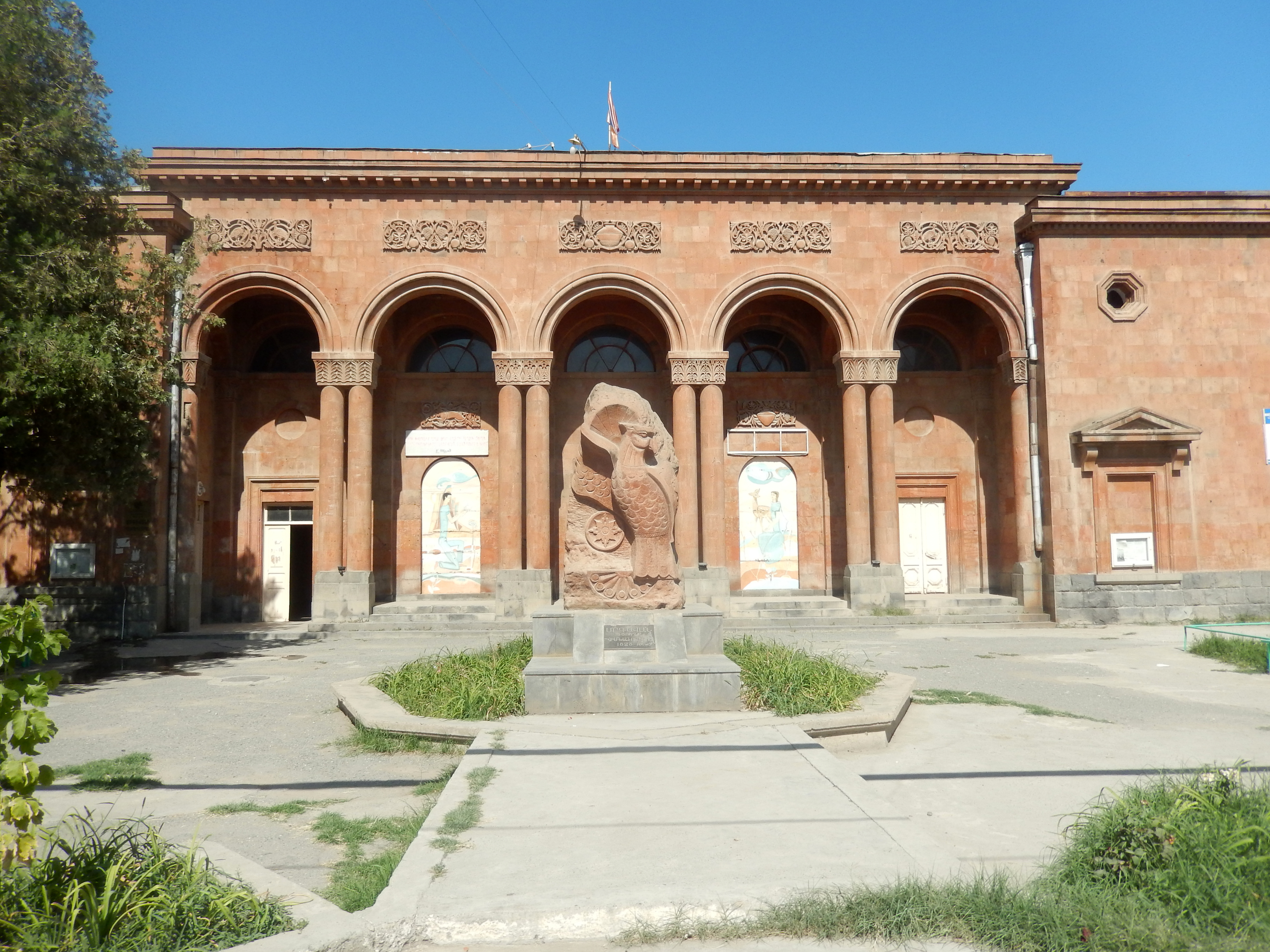
- Mrgavan municipality

- Location within Armenia Location within Ararat
- Coordinates: 39°57′58″N 44°32′00″E
- Country: Armenia
- Province: Ararat
- Municipality: Artashat

Population (2011)
  - Total: 1,606
- Time zone: UTC+4
  - Summer (DST): UTC+5

Mrgavan (Armenian: Մրգավան) is a village in the Artashat Municipality of the Ararat Province of Armenia.
