= Nerkin Nedzhirlu =

- Location within Armenia Location within Ararat
- Coordinates: 40°04′38″N 44°23′33″E
- Country: Armenia
- Marz (Province): Ararat
- Time zone: UTC+4 ( )
  - Summer (DST): UTC+5 ( )

Nerkin Nedzhirlu (also, Nedzhirlu and Nizhneye Nedzhirlu) is a town in the Ararat Province of Armenia.

== See also ==
- Ararat Province
