= Hovtashat =

Hovtashat Հովտաշատ
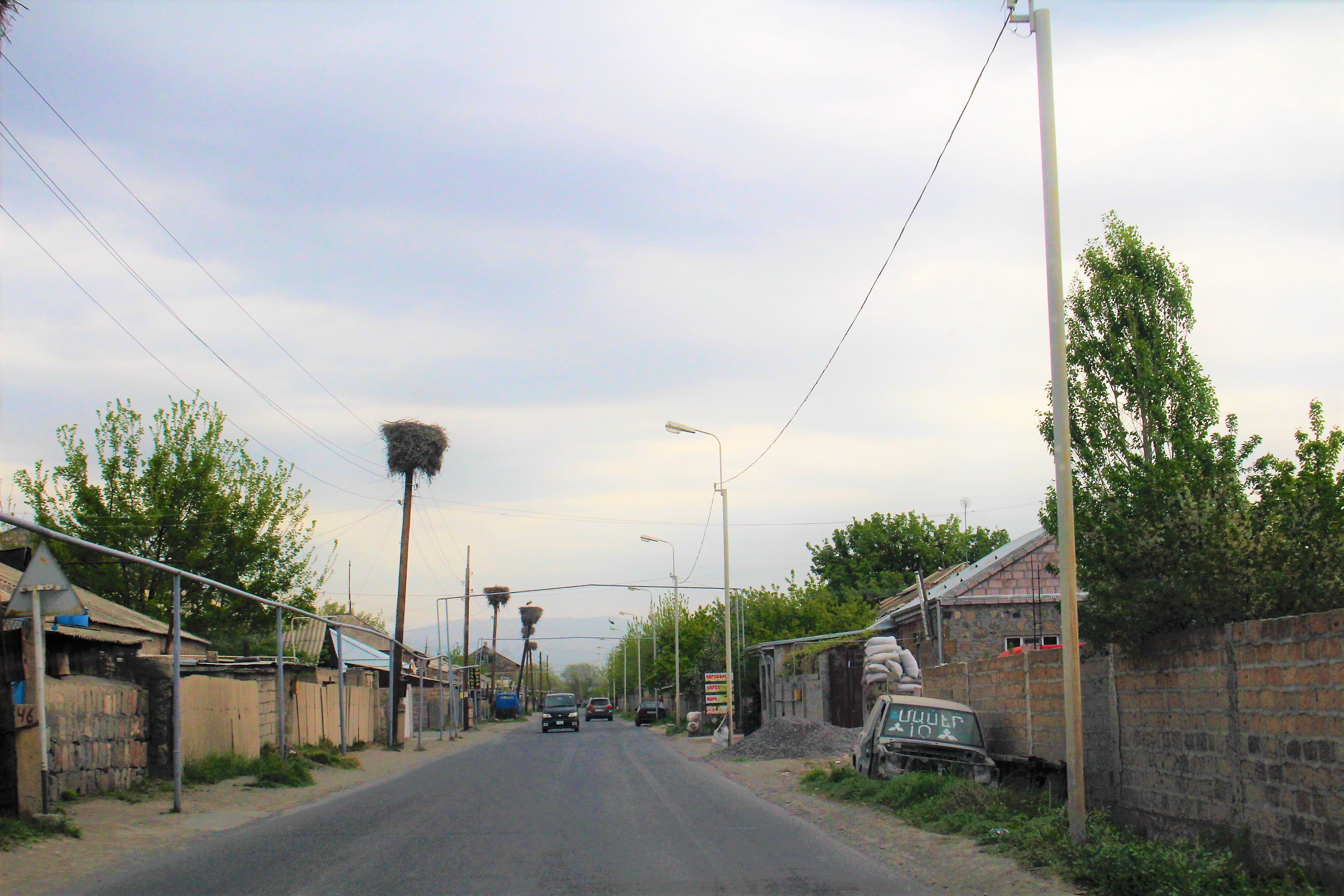

- Location within Armenia Location within Ararat
- Coordinates: 40°06′07″N 44°20′34″E
- Country: Armenia
- Province: Ararat
- Municipality: Masis

Population (2011)
  - Total: 3,207
- Time zone: UTC+4
  - Summer (DST): UTC+5

Hovtashat (Armenian: Հովտաշատ) is a village in the Masis Municipality of the Ararat Province of Armenia.
