= Vardashat =

Village in Ararat, Armenia

Vardashat Վարդաշատ
- Location within Armenia Location within Ararat
- Coordinates: 39°49′58″N 45°01′34″E
- Country: Armenia
- Province: Ararat
- Municipality: Ararat

Population (2011)
  - Total: 178
- Time zone: UTC+4
  - Summer (DST): UTC+5

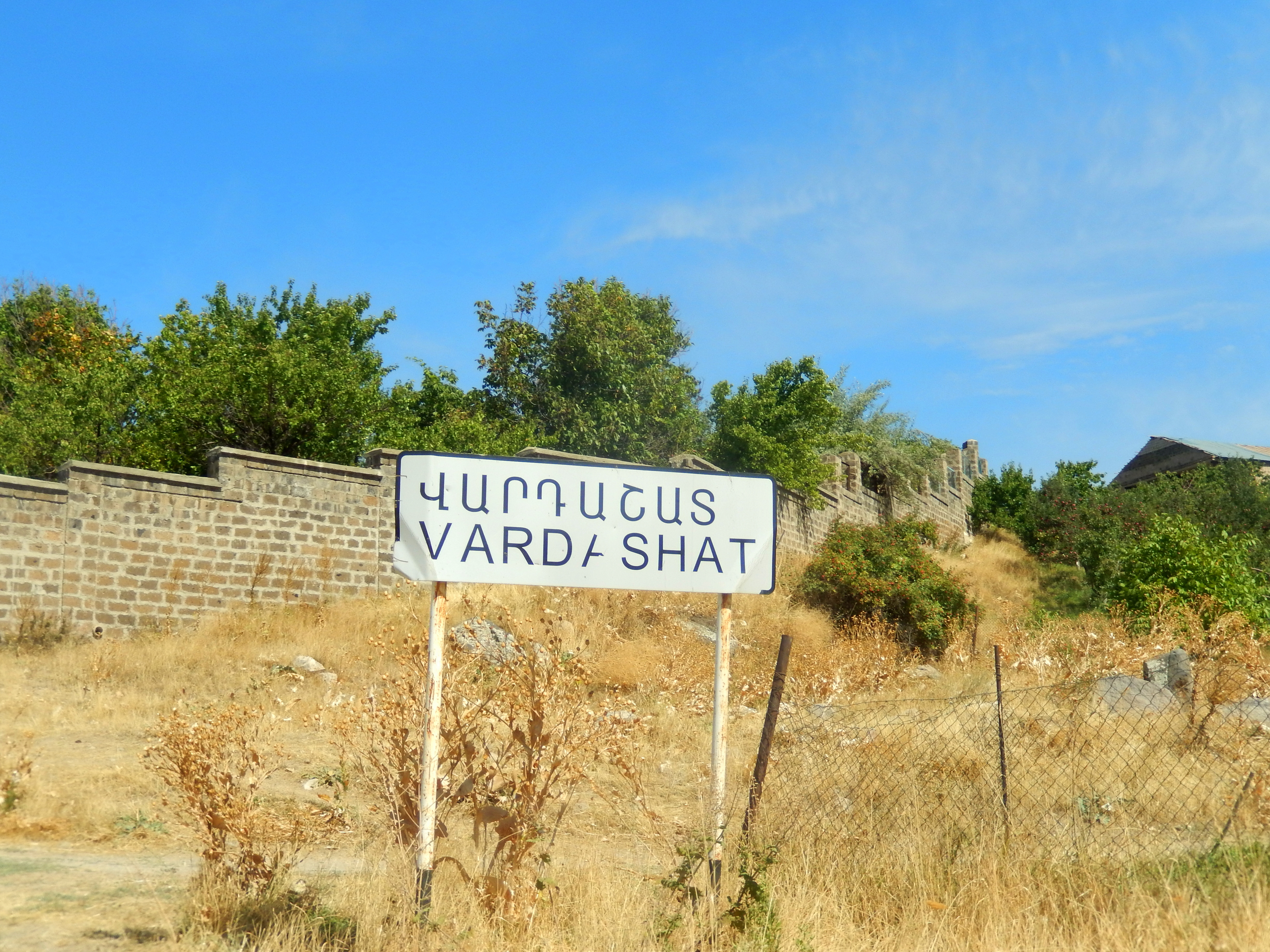

Vardashat (Armenian: Վարդաշատ) is a village in the Ararat Municipality of the Ararat Province of Armenia.
