= Lusashogh =

Village in Ararat, Armenia

Lusashogh Լուսաշող
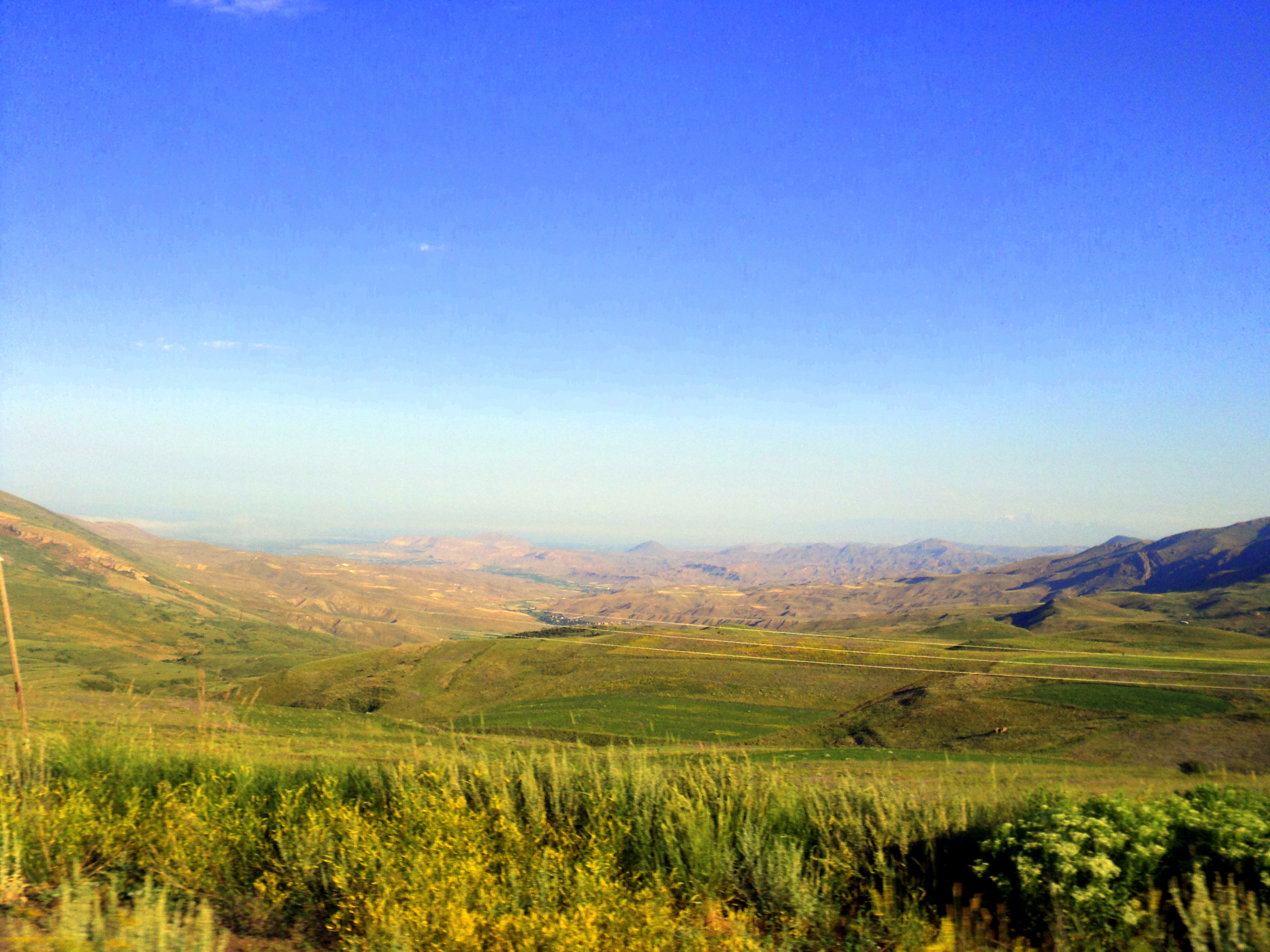
- Lusashogh

- Location within Armenia Location within Ararat
- Coordinates: 39°50′54″N 44°58′42″E
- Country: Armenia
- Province: Ararat
- Municipality: Vedi

Population (2011)
  - Total: 478
- Time zone: UTC+4
  - Summer (DST): UTC+5

Lusashogh (Armenian: Լուսաշող) is a village in the Vedi Municipality of the Ararat Province of Armenia.
