= Minjujisan =

Mountain in South Korea

Coordinates: 36°02′24″N 127°50′57″E

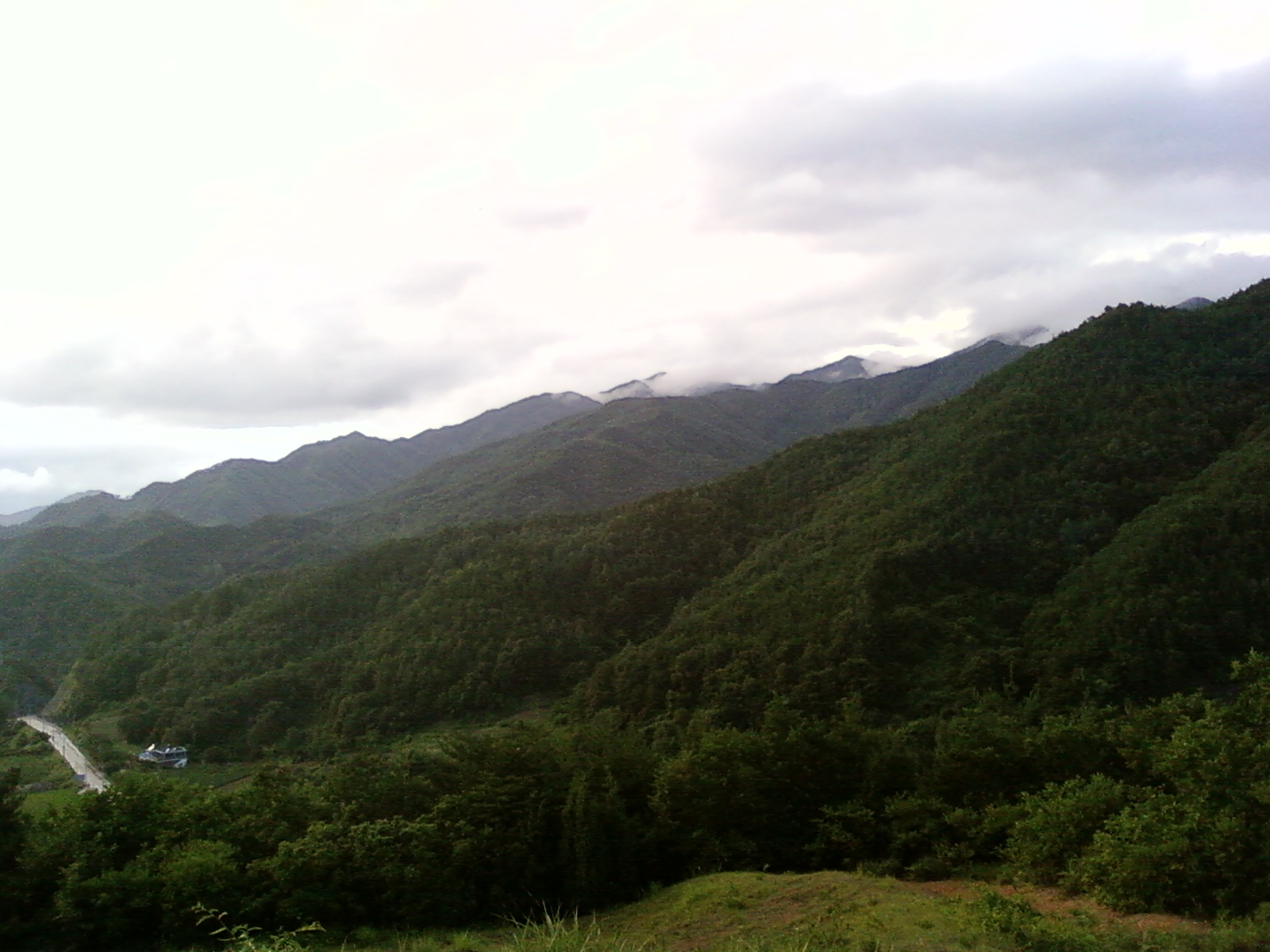
- Part of Minjujisan in Muju, Korea

Highest point
- Elevation: 1,242 m (4,075 ft)

Geography
- Location: South Korea

Minjujisan is a mountain of South Korea. It has an elevation of 1,242 metres.

== See also ==
- List of mountains of Korea
