= Marmarashen =

Village in Ararat, Armenia

Marmarashen Մարմարաշեն
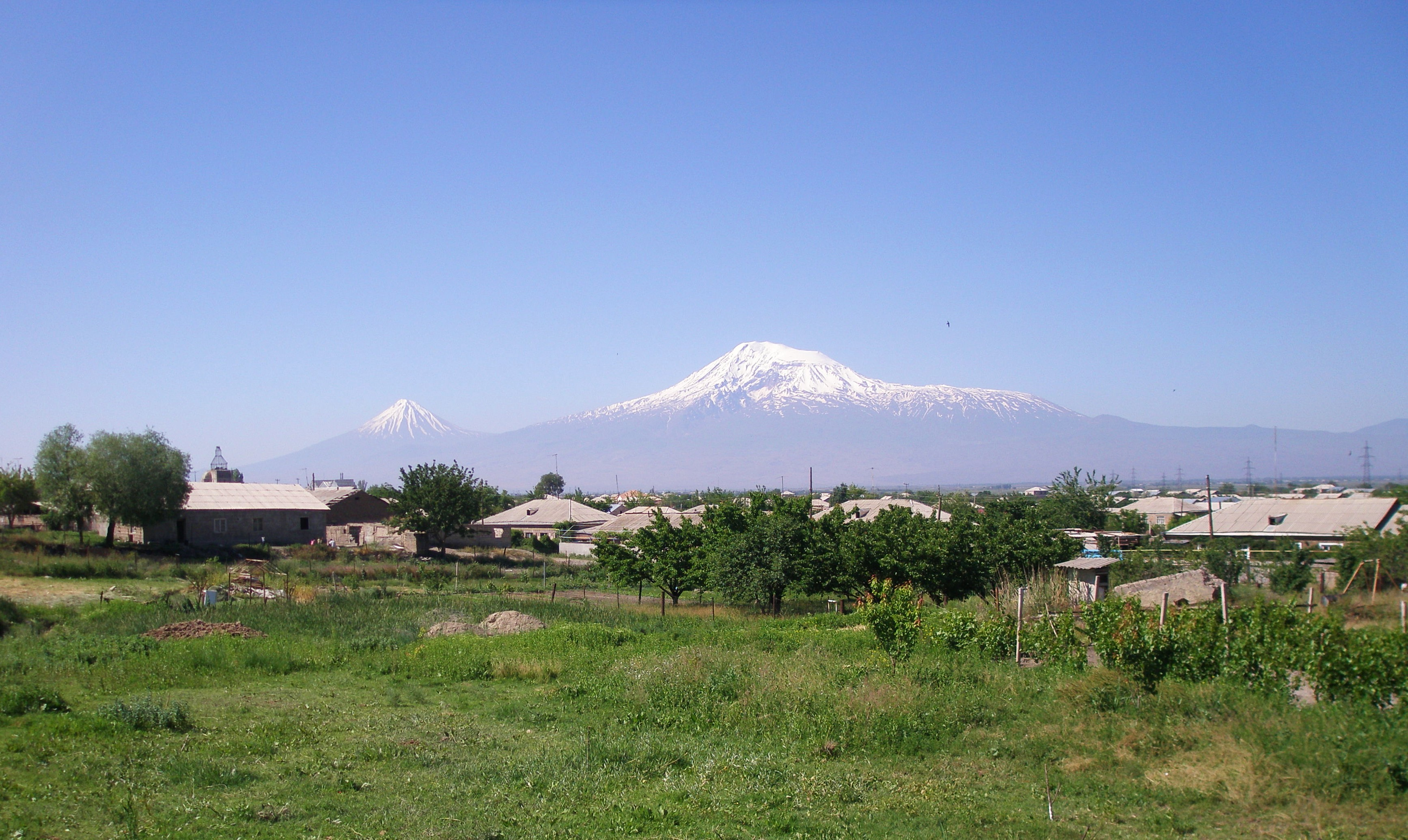
- Nor Kyurin (foreground), Marmarashen (background with unfinished church), and Mt. Ararat, May 2009.

- Location within Armenia Location within Ararat
- Coordinates: 40°03′27″N 44°28′16″E
- Country: Armenia
- Province: Ararat
- Municipality: Masis

Population (2011)
  - Total: 2,871
- Time zone: UTC+4
  - Summer (DST): UTC+5

Marmarashen (Armenian: Մարմարաշեն, lit. 'Marble village'), known until 1967 as Aghamzalu (Armenian: Ախամզալու), is a village in the Masis Municipality of the Ararat Province of Armenia.
