= Urtsadzor =

Village in Ararat, Armenia

Urtsadzor Ուրցաձոր
- Location within Armenia Location within Ararat
- Coordinates: 39°54′45″N 44°49′03″E
- Country: Armenia
- Province: Ararat
- Municipality: Vedi

Government

Population (2011)
  - Total: 2,587
- Time zone: UTC+4
  - Summer (DST): UTC+5

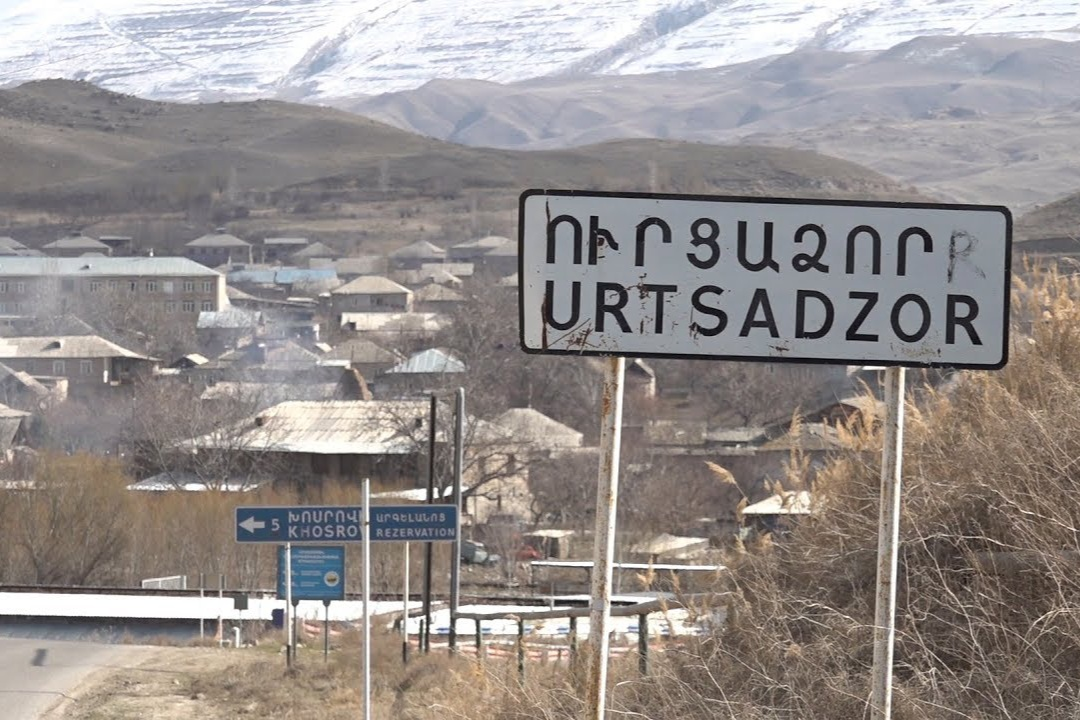
Village entrance c. 2025

Urtsadzor (Armenian: Ուրցաձոր) is a village in the Vedi Municipality of the Ararat Province of Armenia containing the former village of Chimankend. The village was previously the administrative capital of the Gharabaghlar District which existed in 1937–1951 in Soviet Armenia before being reattached to the Ararat Province.

== Nature ==
The village is located at semi-desert zone in the valley of Vedi River. There are about 15 pairs of White Storks breeding right in the village. Vicinity of the village have 131 species of butterflies and are recognized as Prime Butterfly Area. Also number of bird species are recorded inside the village (e.g. Syrian Woodpecker, Levant Sparrowhawk, etc.) and its outskirts (e.g. Lanner Falcon, Grey-headed Bunting, Isabelline Wheatear, and others).

=== Climate ===
Urtsadzor has a cold Semi-arid climate (Köppen climate classification: BSk)

Climate data for Urtsadzor (1991-2020)
Month	Jan	Feb	Mar	Apr	May	Jun	Jul	Aug	Sep	Oct	Nov	Dec	Year
Record high °C (°F)	15.2 (59.4)	18.4 (65.1)	26.2 (79.2)	31.8 (89.2)	35.3 (95.5)	39.5 (103.1)	40.8 (105.4)	41.5 (106.7)	38 (100)	33.2 (91.8)	24.5 (76.1)	20.8 (69.4)	41.5 (106.7)
Daily mean °C (°F)	−2.9 (26.8)	0.1 (32.2)	6.7 (44.1)	12.4 (54.3)	16.7 (62.1)	21.6 (70.9)	25.1 (77.2)	25.3 (77.5)	20.5 (68.9)	14.1 (57.4)	6.1 (43.0)	−0.2 (31.6)	12.1 (53.8)
Record low °C (°F)	−21.5 (−6.7)	−16.8 (1.8)	−10.8 (12.6)	−8.7 (16.3)	−0.1 (31.8)	5.1 (41.2)	7.9 (46.2)	9.4 (48.9)	3.1 (37.6)	−2 (28)	−12.5 (9.5)	−22.5 (−8.5)	−22.5 (−8.5)
Average precipitation mm (inches)	29.1 (1.15)	28.0 (1.10)	40.7 (1.60)	58.5 (2.30)	54.3 (2.14)	25.8 (1.02)	17.6 (0.69)	11.0 (0.43)	15.0 (0.59)	27.8 (1.09)	30.3 (1.19)	24.0 (0.94)	362.1 (14.24)
Average precipitation days (≥ 1 mm)	4.8	4.8	6.1	8.5	9.7	5.2	3	2.2	2.6	5.4	4.8	4.4	61.5
Average relative humidity (%)	76.7	70.2	62.3	60.7	62.2	55	52.8	50.4	53.9	63.7	70.9	76.7	63.0
