= Azatavan =

Azatavan Ազատավան
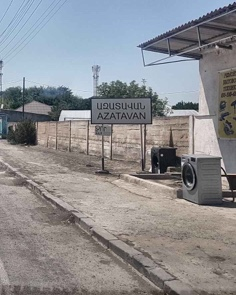
- Entrance to Azatavan

- Location within Armenia Location within Ararat
- Coordinates: 39°59′N 44°30′E
- Country: Armenia
- Province: Ararat
- Municipality: Artashat
- Elevation: 834 m (2,736 ft)

Population (2011)
  - Total: 2,713
- Time zone: UTC+4
  - Summer (DST): UTC+5

Azatavan (Armenian: Ազատավան) is a village in the Artashat Municipality of the Ararat Province of Armenia.

== Notable people ==
- Agasi Babayan was an Armenian director, screenwriter, and actor. He received the title of Merited Artist of the RSFSR in 1974.
