= Zar, Armenia =

Village in Kotayk, Armenia

Zar Զառ
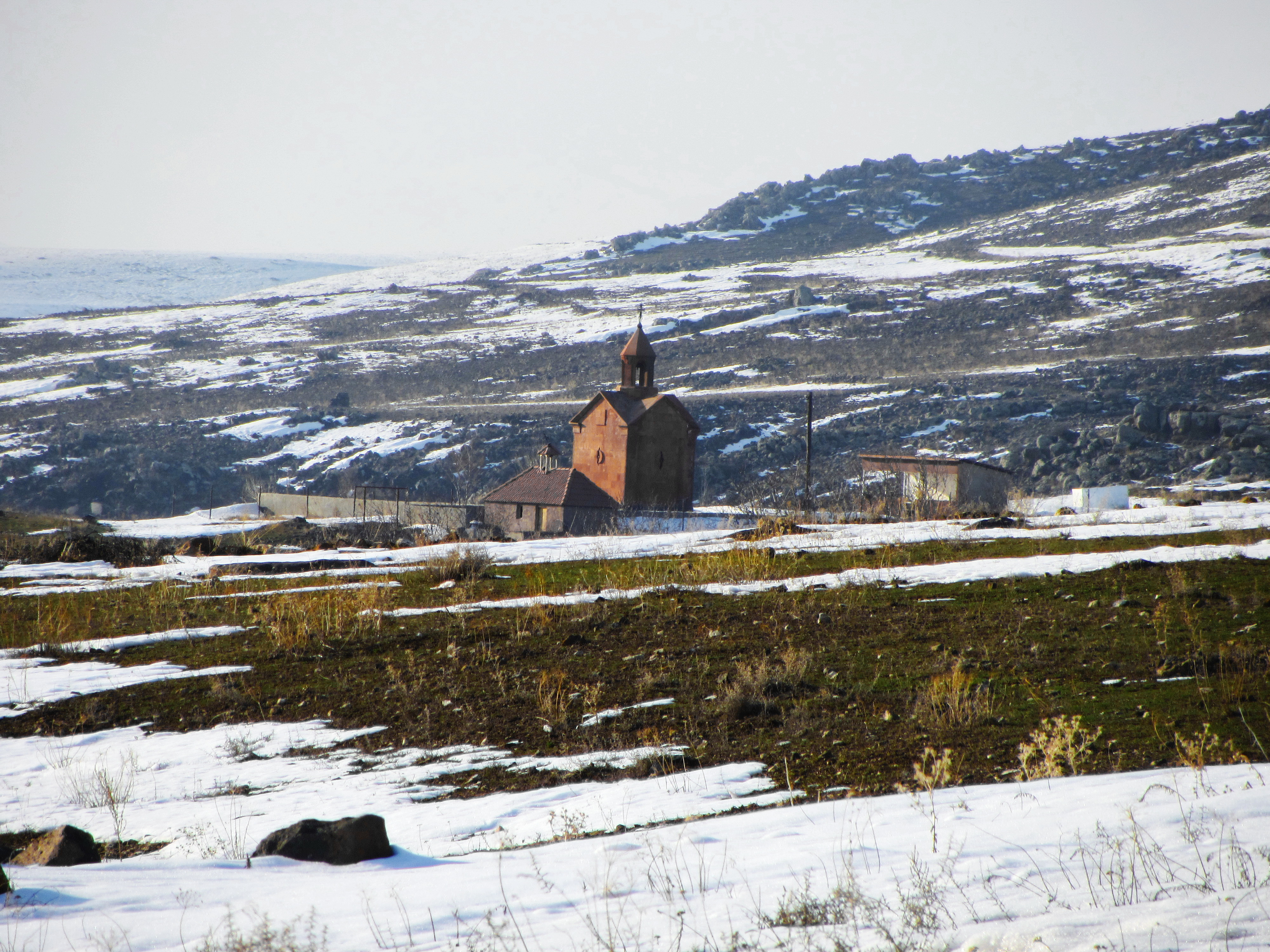
- Surp Karapet Church in Zar

- Location within Armenia
- Coordinates: 40°15′40″N 44°44′10″E
- Country: Armenia
- Marz (Province): Kotayk
- Elevation: 1,750 m (5,740 ft)

Population (2011)
  - Total: 1,337
- Time zone: UTC+4 ( )

Zar (Armenian: Զառ), is a village in the Kotayk Province of Armenia.

== See also ==
- Kotayk Province
