= Zorak, Armenia =

Zorak Զորակ
- Location within Armenia Location within Ararat
- Coordinates: 40°05′33″N 44°23′31″E
- Country: Armenia
- Province: Ararat
- Municipality: Masis

Population (2011)
  - Total: 1,783
- Time zone: UTC+4
  - Summer (DST): UTC+5

Zorak (Armenian: Զորակ; Azerbaijani: Zəngilər) is a village in the Masis Municipality of the Ararat Province of Armenia. The village was mainly populated by Azerbaijanis before the exodus of Azerbaijanis from Armenia after the outbreak of the Nagorno-Karabakh conflict. In 1988-1989 Armenian refugees from Azerbaijan settled in the village.
