= Nizami, Armenia =

Nizami Նիզամի
- Location within Armenia Location within Ararat
- Coordinates: 40°05′29″N 44°24′15″E
- Country: Armenia
- Province: Ararat
- Municipality: Masis

Population (2011)
  - Total: 1,327
- Time zone: UTC+4
  - Summer (DST): UTC+5

Nizami (Armenian: Նիզամի) is a village in the Masis Municipality of the Ararat Province of Armenia. It's named for the poet Nizami Ganjevi.
