= Verin Artashat =

Village in Ararat, Armenia

Verin Artashat Վերին Արտաշատ
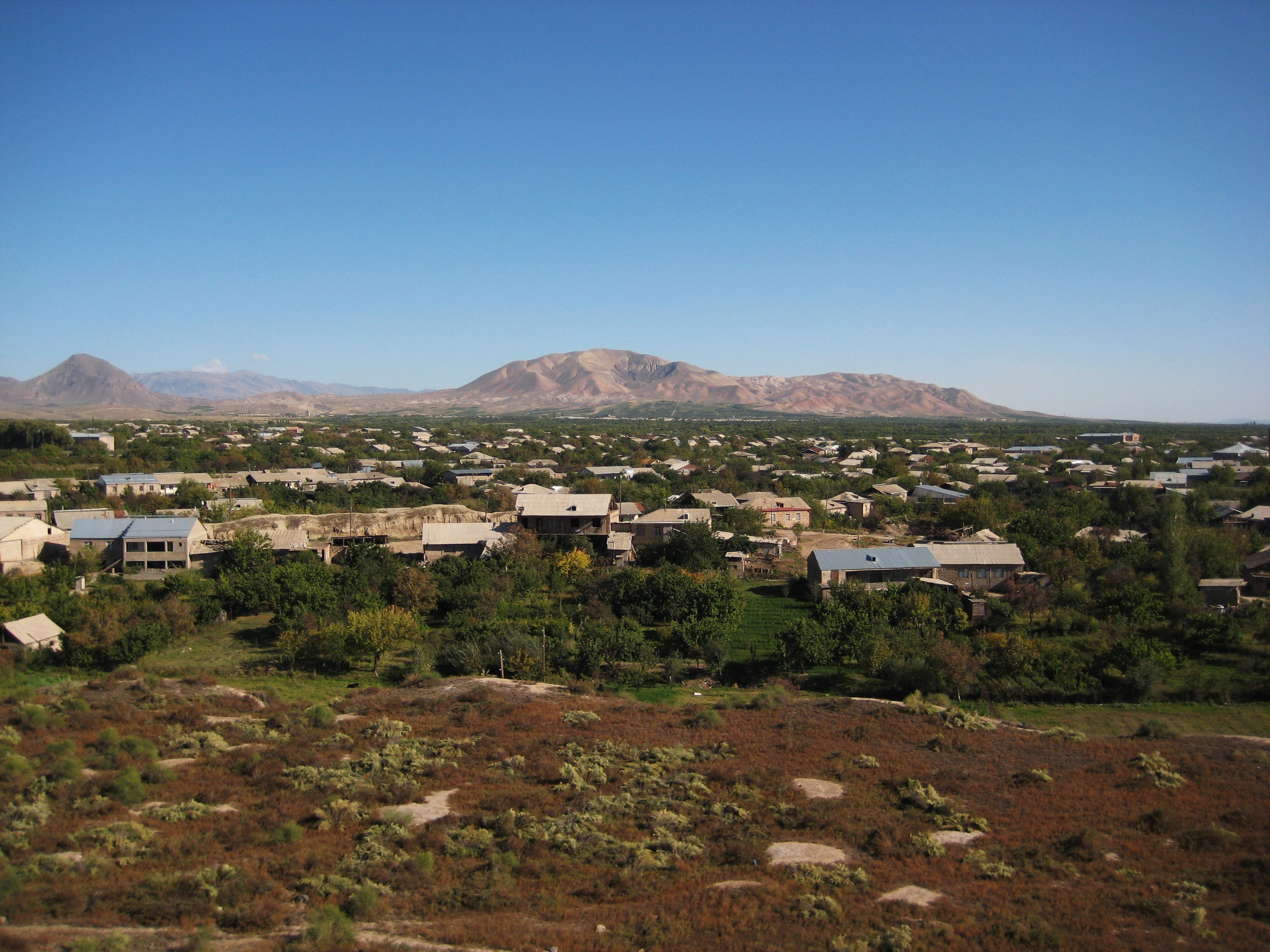
- Norashen (left) and Verin Artashat (right) as seen from the ruins of Dvin.

- Location within Armenia Location within Ararat
- Coordinates: 40°00′02″N 44°35′06″E
- Country: Armenia
- Province: Ararat
- Municipality: Artashat

Government
  - Mayor: Ashot Ghazaryan

Area
  - Total: 7.85 km^{2} (3.03 sq mi)

Population (2011)
  - Total: 4,334
  - Density: 552/km^{2} (1,430/sq mi)
- Time zone: UTC+4
  - Summer (DST): UTC+5

Verin Artashat (Armenian: Վերին Արտաշատ) is a village in the Artashat Municipality of the Ararat Province of Armenia. It sits adjacent to the ruins of the ancient city of Dvin.
