= Norashen, Ararat =

Village in Ararat, Armenia

Norashen Նորաշեն
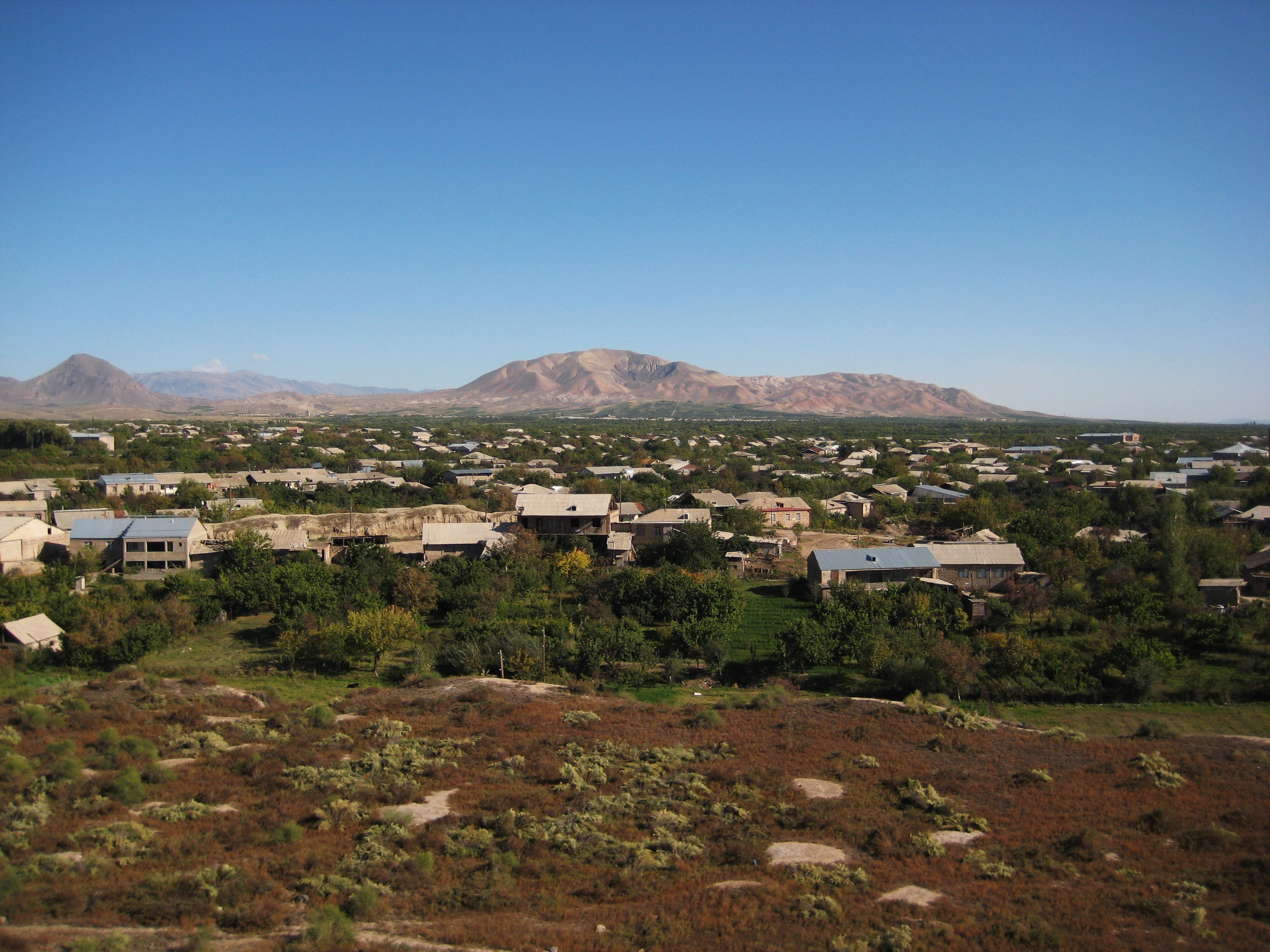
- Norashen (left) and Verin Artashat (right) as seen from the ruins of Dvin.

- Location within Armenia Location within Ararat
- Coordinates: 40°00′15″N 44°35′41″E
- Country: Armenia
- Province: Ararat
- Municipality: Artashat

Government
  - Mayor: Artush Sargsyan

Area
  - Total: 10.14 km^{2} (3.92 sq mi)

Population (2011)
  - Total: 3,034
- Time zone: UTC+4
  - Summer (DST): UTC+5

Norashen (Armenian: Նորաշեն) is a village in the Artashat Municipality of the Ararat Province of Armenia. It is located adjacent to the ruins of the ancient city of Dvin.
