= Shenavan =

Shenavan may refer to:

- Shenavan, Aragatsotn, Armenia
- Shenavan, Armavir, Armenia
- Shenavan, Lori, Armenia
