= Ginevet, Armavir =

Ginevet
- Location within Armenia
- Coordinates: 40°09′N 44°22′E
- Country: Armenia
- Marz (Province): Armavir
- Time zone: UTC+4 ( )

Ginevet is an abandoned settlement and a former village in the Armavir Province of Armenia.
