= Mugam (disambiguation) =

Mugam is a folk musical composition from Azerbaijan.

Mugam may also refer to:

- Mugam (1999 film), a Tamil language film
- Mugam, Armenia, a town in Armavir Province, Armenia
