= Azatavan, Armavir =

Village in Armavir, Armenia

Azatavan
- Location within Armenia
- Coordinates: 40°08′00″N 44°04′00″E
- Country: Armenia
- Marz (Province): Armavir
- Time zone: UTC+4 ( )
  - Summer (DST): UTC+5 ( )

Azatavan is a town in the Armavir Province of Armenia.

== See also ==
- Armavir Province
