= Jrarbi =

Village in Armavir, Armenia

Jrarbi Ջրարբի
- Location within Armenia
- Coordinates: 40°5′30″N 44°14′0″E
- Country: Armenia
- Marz (Province): Armavir

Population (2011)
  - Total: 1,600
- Time zone: UTC+4 ( )
  - Summer (DST): UTC+5 ( )

Jrarbi (Armenian: Ջրարբի); formerly known as Jrarati trchnafabrika (meaning "Jrarat poultry factory"), is a village in the Armavir Province of Armenia. The population was 1,600 at the 2011 census.

== See also ==
- Armavir Province
