= Talvorik =

Village in Armavir, Armenia

Talvorik Տալվորիկ
- Location within Armenia
- Coordinates: 40°07′N 43°53′E
- Country: Armenia
- Marz (Province): Armavir

Population (2011)
  - Total: 199
- Time zone: UTC+4 ( )
  - Summer (DST): UTC+5 ( )

Talvorik (Armenian: Տալվորիկ) is a village in the Armavir Province of Armenia.

== See also ==
- Armavir Province
