= Amberd, Armavir =

Village in Armavir, Armenia

Amberd Ամբերդ
- Location within Armenia
- Coordinates: 40°14′30″N 44°16′22″E
- Country: Armenia
- Marz (Province): Armavir

Population (2011)
  - Total: 1,412
- Time zone: UTC+4 ( )
  - Summer (DST): UTC+5 ( )

Amberd (Armenian: Ամբերդ); known as Franganots until 1978, is a village in the Armavir Province of Armenia. The village is home to the historic church of Thomas the Apostle, dating back to the 12th century.

== See also ==
- Armavir Province
