= Haytagh =

Haytagh Հայթաղ
- Location within Armenia
- Coordinates: 40°10′51″N 44°13′47″E
- Country: Armenia
- Province: Armavir

Population (2011)
  - Total: 2,612
- Time zone: UTC+4 ( )
  - Summer (DST): UTC+5 ( )

Haytagh (Armenian: Հայթաղ, also Romanized as Hayt’agh, Aytakh, and Aytag) is a town in the Armavir Province of Armenia.

== See also ==
- Armavir Province
