= Arevashat =

Village in Armavir, Armenia

Arevashat Արևաշատ
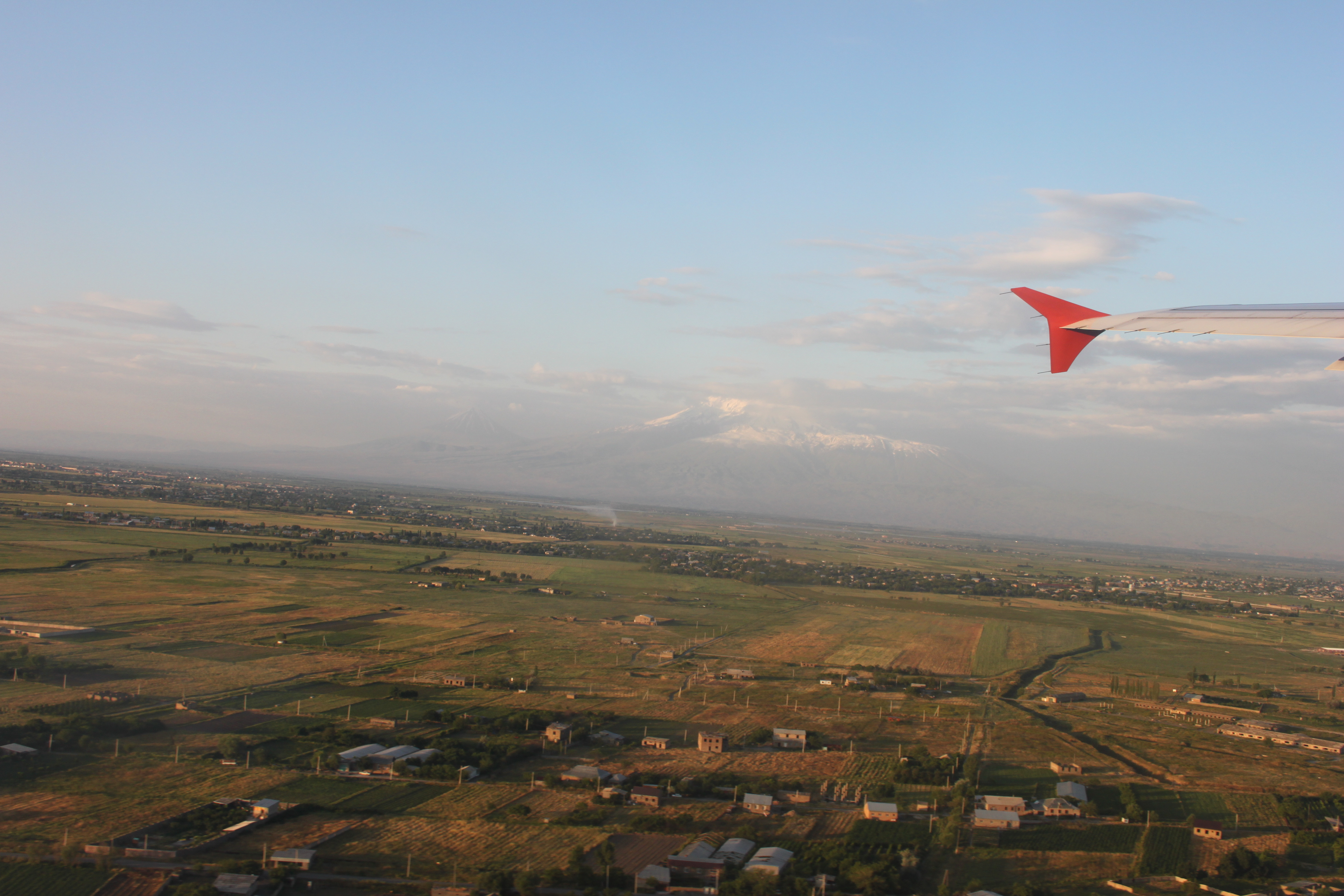
- Arevashat as seen from the air in the foreground

- Location within Armenia
- Coordinates: 40°08′30″N 44°22′15″E
- Country: Armenia
- Marz (Province): Armavir

Population (2011)
  - Total: 1,917
- Time zone: UTC+4 ( )
  - Summer (DST): UTC+5 ( )

Arevashat (Armenian: Արևաշատ) known as Varmaziar until 1946, is a village in the Armavir Province of Armenia.

== Gallery ==
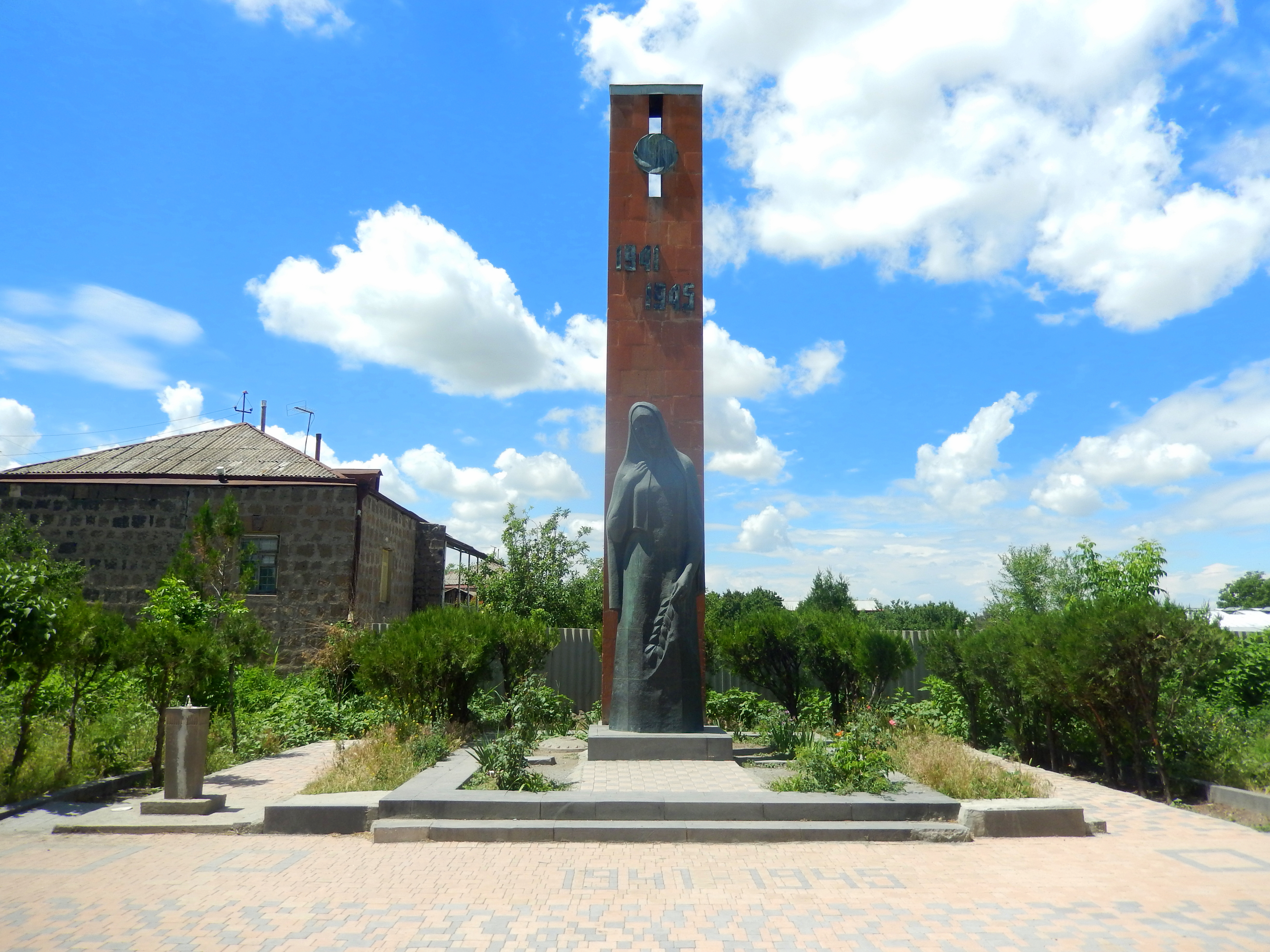
World War II memorial

== See also ==
- Armavir Province
