= Artimet =

Village in Armavir, Armenia

Artimet Արտիմետ
- Location within Armenia
- Coordinates: 40°09′05″N 44°15′59″E
- Country: Armenia
- Marz (Province): Armavir Province

Government
  - Mayor: Vardan Mirzakhanyan

Population (2011)
  - Total: 1,704
- Time zone: UTC+4 ( )

Artimet (Armenian: Արտիմետ; until recently, Atarbekyan and Atarbekian) is a village in the Armavir Province of Armenia. The church of the village named after Saint Gregory the Illuminator, dates back to 1876.

Artimet has a population of 1,704 at the 2011 census, up from 1,630 at the 2001 census.

== See also ==
- Armavir Province
