= Shavarut =

Village in Armavir, Armenia

- Location within Armenia
- Coordinates: 40°05′N 43°45′E
- Country: Armenia
- Marz (Province): Armavir
- Time zone: UTC+4 ( )
  - Summer (DST): UTC+5 ( )

Shavarut is a village in the Armavir Province of Armenia.

== See also ==
- Armavir Province
