= Lernagog =

Lernagog Լեռնագոգ
- Location within Armenia
- Coordinates: 40°15′25″N 43°54′29″E
- Country: Armenia
- Marz (Province): Armavir

Population (2011)
  - Total: 1,700
- Time zone: UTC+4 ( )
  - Summer (DST): UTC+5 ( )

Lernagog (Armenian: Լեռնագոգ) is a village in the Armavir Province of Armenia. The village was formerly a sovkhoz. The village is sponsored by COAF Children of Armenia Fund and is one of the cleanest villages in Armenia. It has a very good school with the first creativity lab in Armenia.

== History ==
An 8th century B.C. settlement has been discovered at "Lernagog-1" site near the village. Archaeologists have also discovered traces of a clay construction, which testifies to the fact that people mastered clay architecture.

== See also ==
- Armavir Province
