= Hushakert =

Village in Armavir, Armenia

Hushakert Հուշակերտ
- Location within Armenia
- Coordinates: 40°04′52″N 43°55′35″E
- Country: Armenia
- Marz (Province): Armavir

Population (2011)
  - Total: 855
- Time zone: UTC+4 ( )
  - Summer (DST): UTC+5 ( )

Hushakert (Armenian: Հուշակերտ; until 1968, Shah-Varut) is a village in the Armavir Province of Armenia.

== See also ==
- Armavir Province
