= Jrashen, Armavir =

Village in Armavir, Armenia

Jrashen Ջրաշեն
- Location within Armenia
- Coordinates: 40°05′N 44°01′E
- Country: Armenia
- Marz (Province): Armavir
- Founded: 1928

Population (2011)
  - Total: 760
- Time zone: UTC+4 ( )
  - Summer (DST): UTC+5 ( )

Jrashen (Armenian: Ջրաշեն), is a village in the Armavir Province of Armenia. It was founded in 1928. According to the 2011 census, the population was 760.

== See also ==
- Armavir Province
