= Nor Kesaria =

Village in Armavir, Armenia

Nor Kesaria Նոր Կեսարիա
- Location within Armenia
- Coordinates: 40°04′N 43°54′E
- Country: Armenia
- Marz (Province): Armavir
- Founded: 1949

Population (2011)
  - Total: 1,269
- Time zone: UTC+4 ( )
  - Summer (DST): UTC+5 ( )

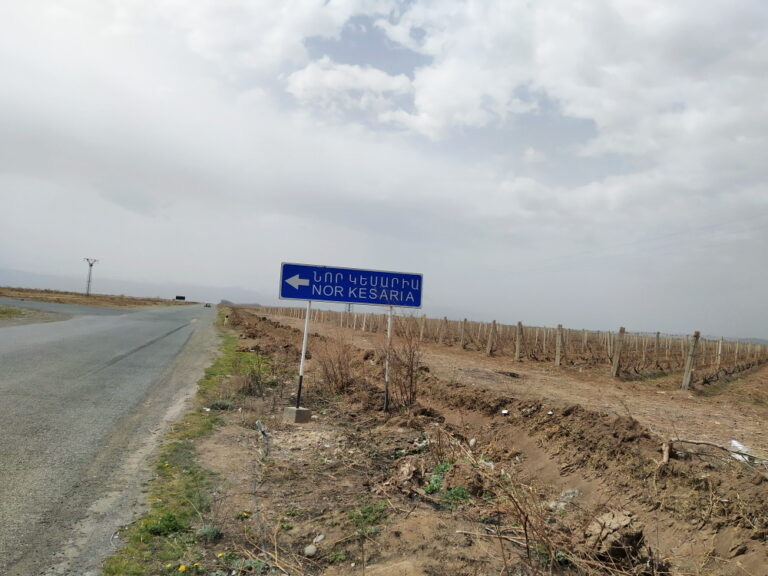

Nor Kesaria (Armenian: Նոր Կեսարիա) is a town in the Armavir Province of Armenia. The town was founded in 1949 as a state farm for geranium oil extraction.

== See also ==
- Armavir Province
