= Koghbavan =

Village in Armavir, Armenia

Koghbavan Կողբավան
- Location within Armenia
- Coordinates: 40°09′N 43°45′E
- Country: Armenia
- Marz (Province): Armavir

Population (2011)
  - Total: 121
- Time zone: UTC+4 ( )
  - Summer (DST): UTC+5 ( )

Koghbavan (Armenian: Կողբավան) is a village in the Armavir Province of Armenia. The village is located in southwestern Armavir Province, in an area once closed to foreigners.

== See also ==
- Armavir Province
