= Haykavan, Armavir =

Haykavan Հայկավան
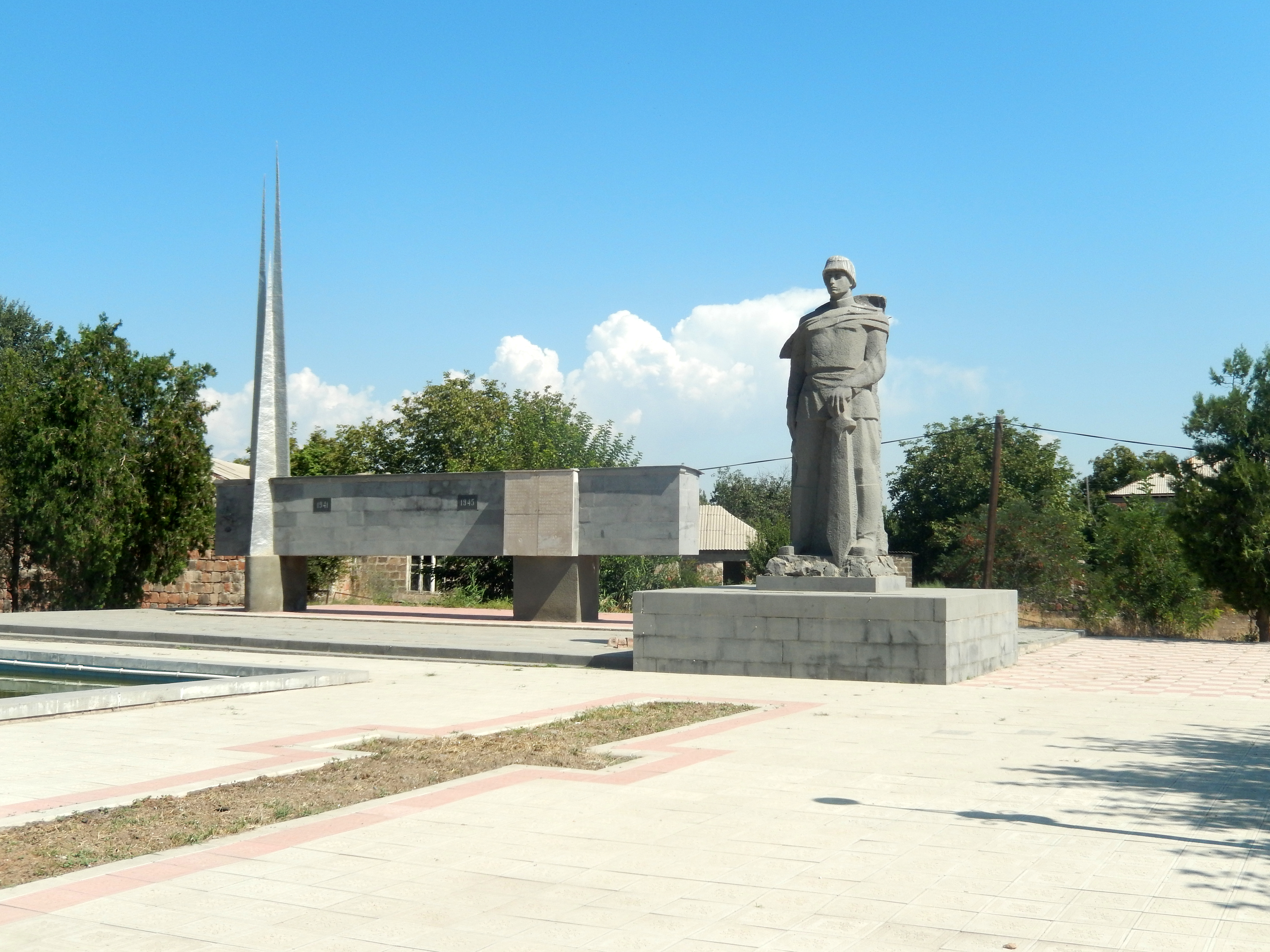
- World War II memorial in Haykavan

- Location within Armenia
- Coordinates: 40°05′N 44°03′E
- Country: Armenia
- Marz (Province): Armavir

Population (2011)
  - Total: 1,508
- Time zone: UTC+4 ( )
  - Summer (DST): UTC+5 ( )

Haykavan (Armenian: Հայկավան, also Romanized as Haikavan and Aykavan; until 1946, T'apadibi) is a town in the Armavir Province of Armenia.

== See also ==
- Armavir Province
