= Shenavan, Armavir =

Village in Armavir, Armenia

Shenavan Շենավան
- Location within Armenia
- Coordinates: 40°03′N 43°56′E
- Country: Armenia
- Marz (Province): Armavir

Population (2011)
  - Total: 1,423
- Time zone: UTC+4 ( )
  - Summer (DST): UTC+5 ( )

Shenavan (Armenian: Շենավան; until 1946, Kyalagarkh and Kolagarkh) is a town in the Armavir Province of Armenia.

== See also ==
- Armavir Province
