= Mugam, Armenia =

Mugam
- Location within Armenia
- Coordinates: 40°01′N 44°17′E
- Country: Armenia
- Marz (Province): Armavir
- Time zone: UTC+4 ( )
  - Summer (DST): UTC+5 ( )

Mugam (also, Mugamlu) is a town in the Armavir Province of Armenia.

== See also ==
- Armavir Province
