= Armavir Province =

Province of Armenia

Armavir Արմավիր
- Province
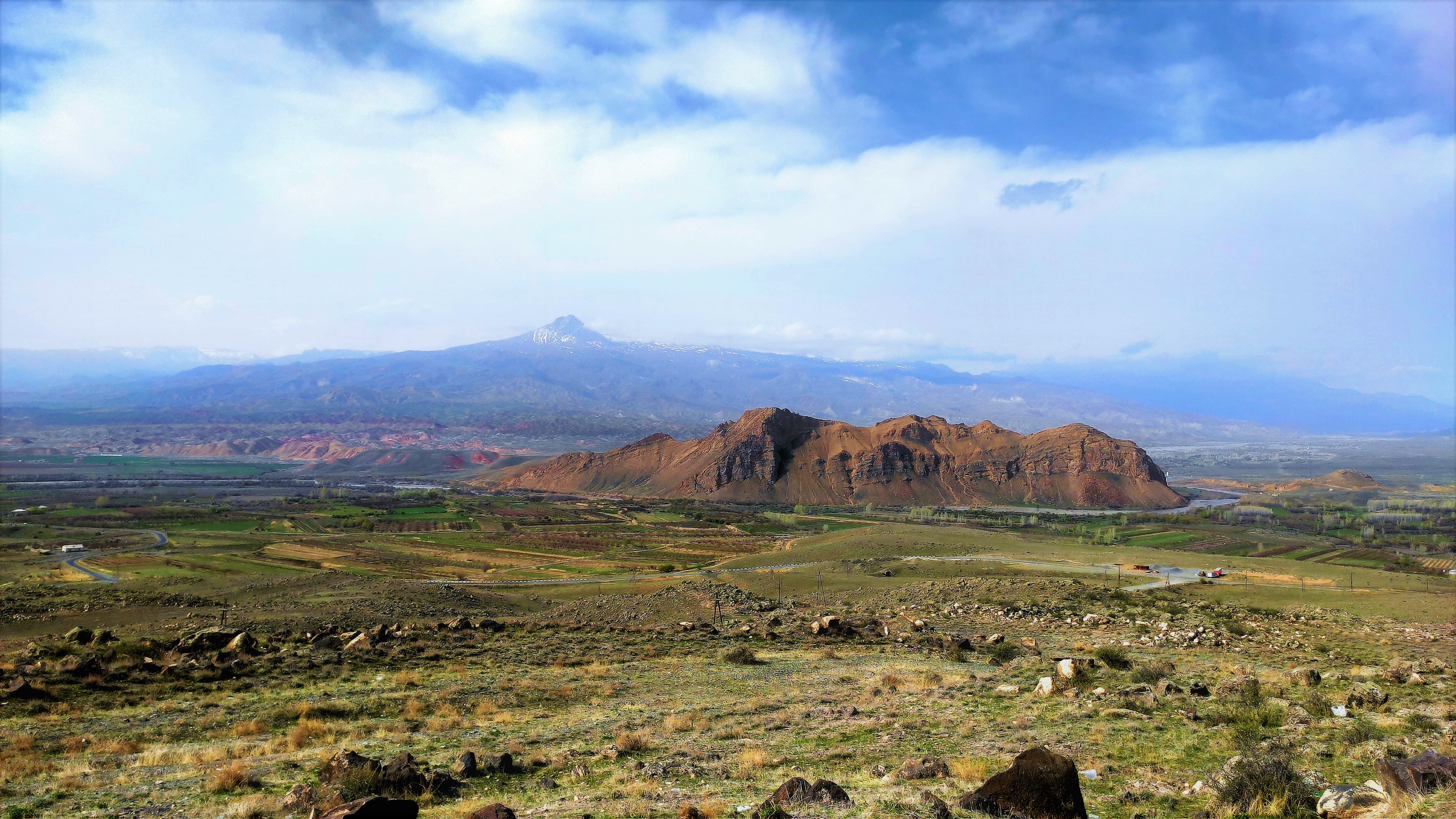
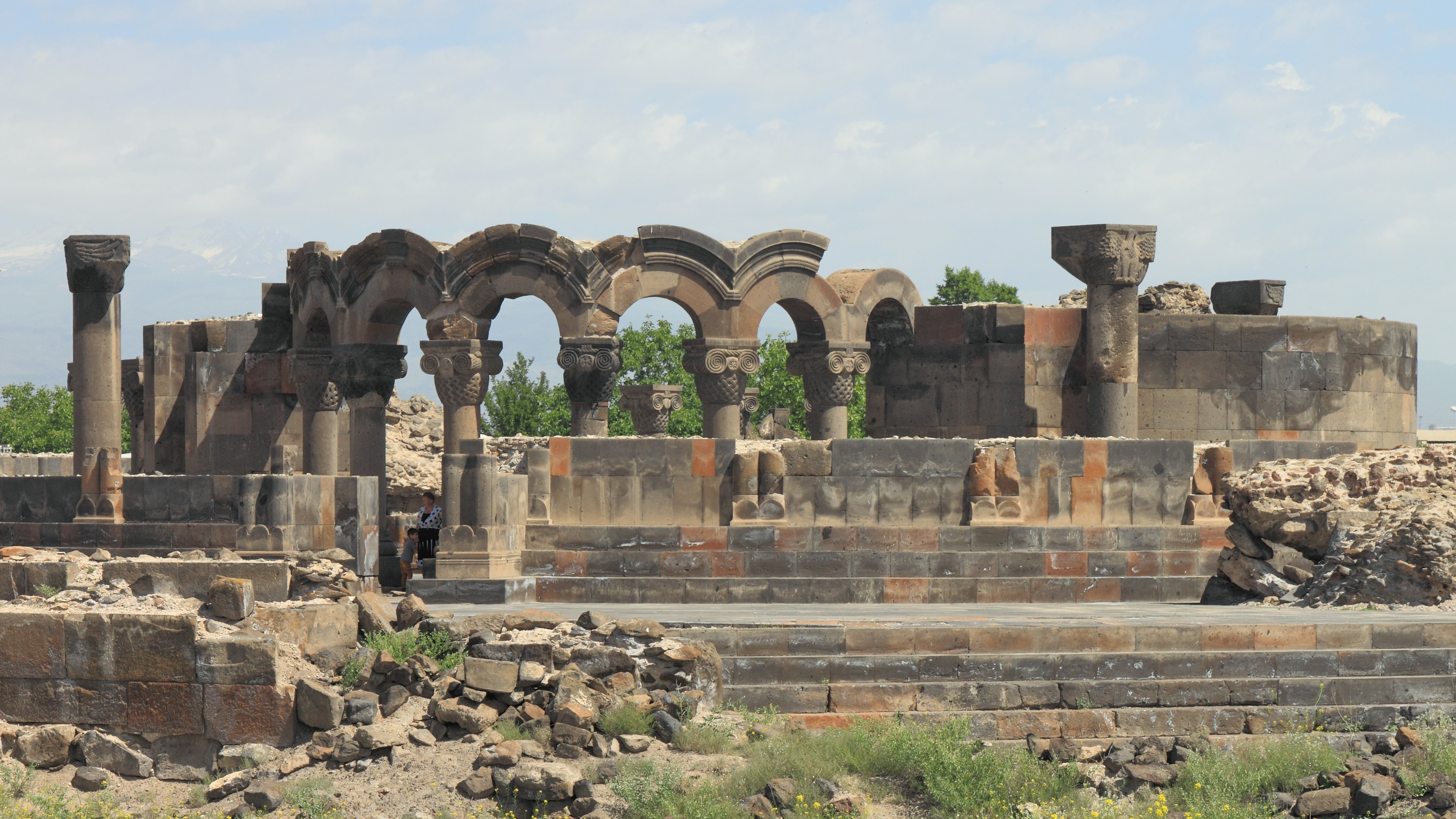
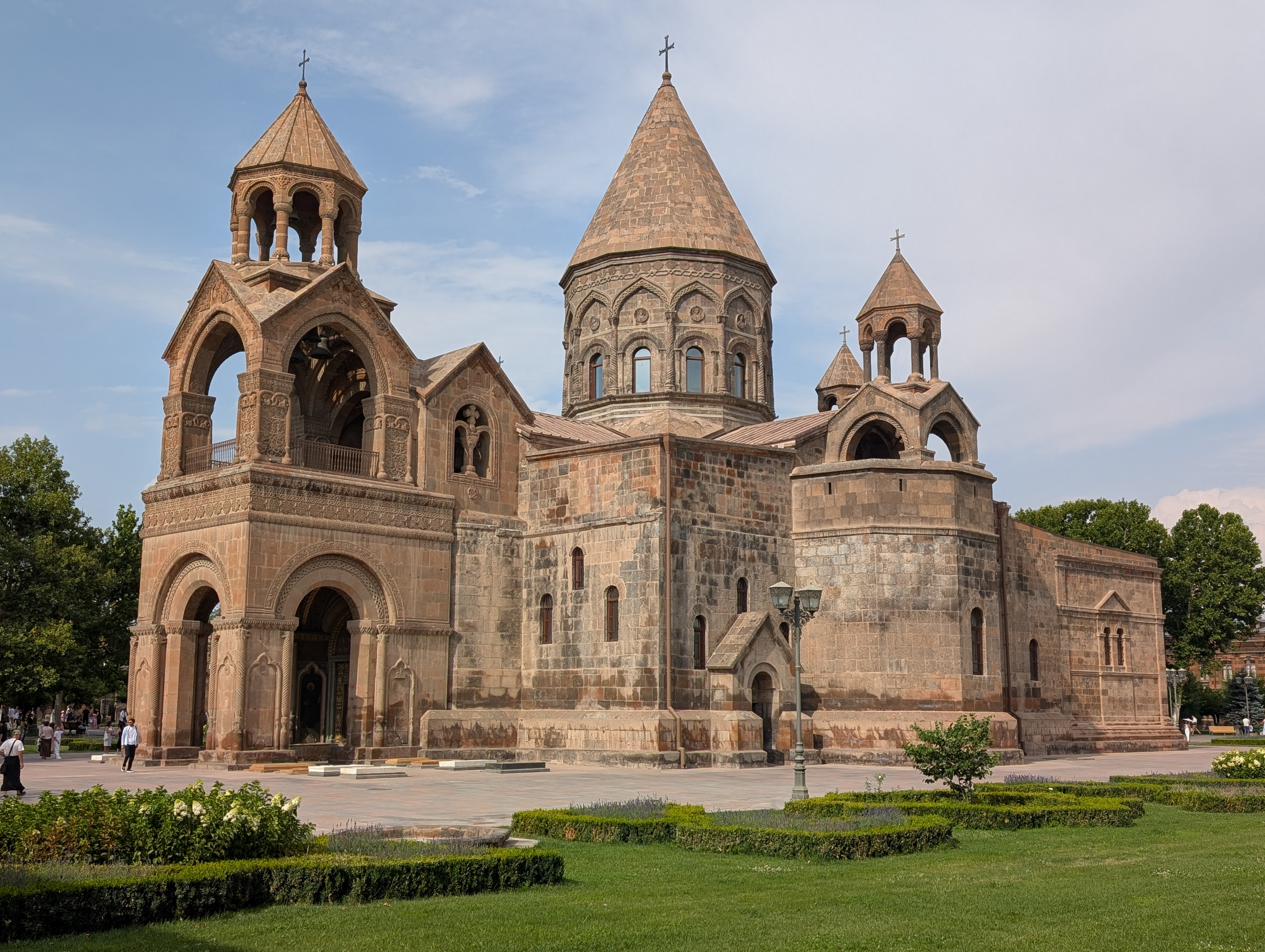
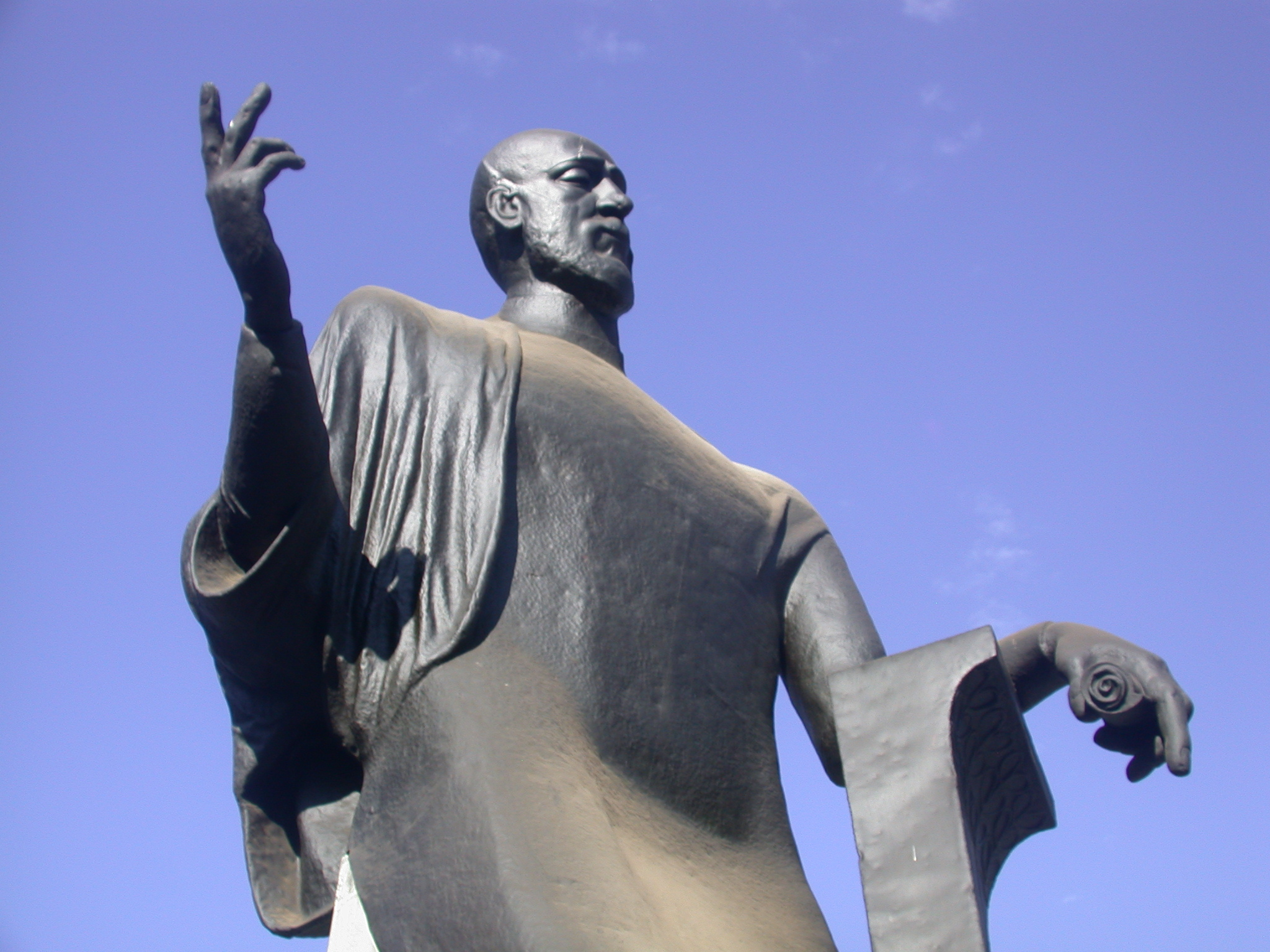
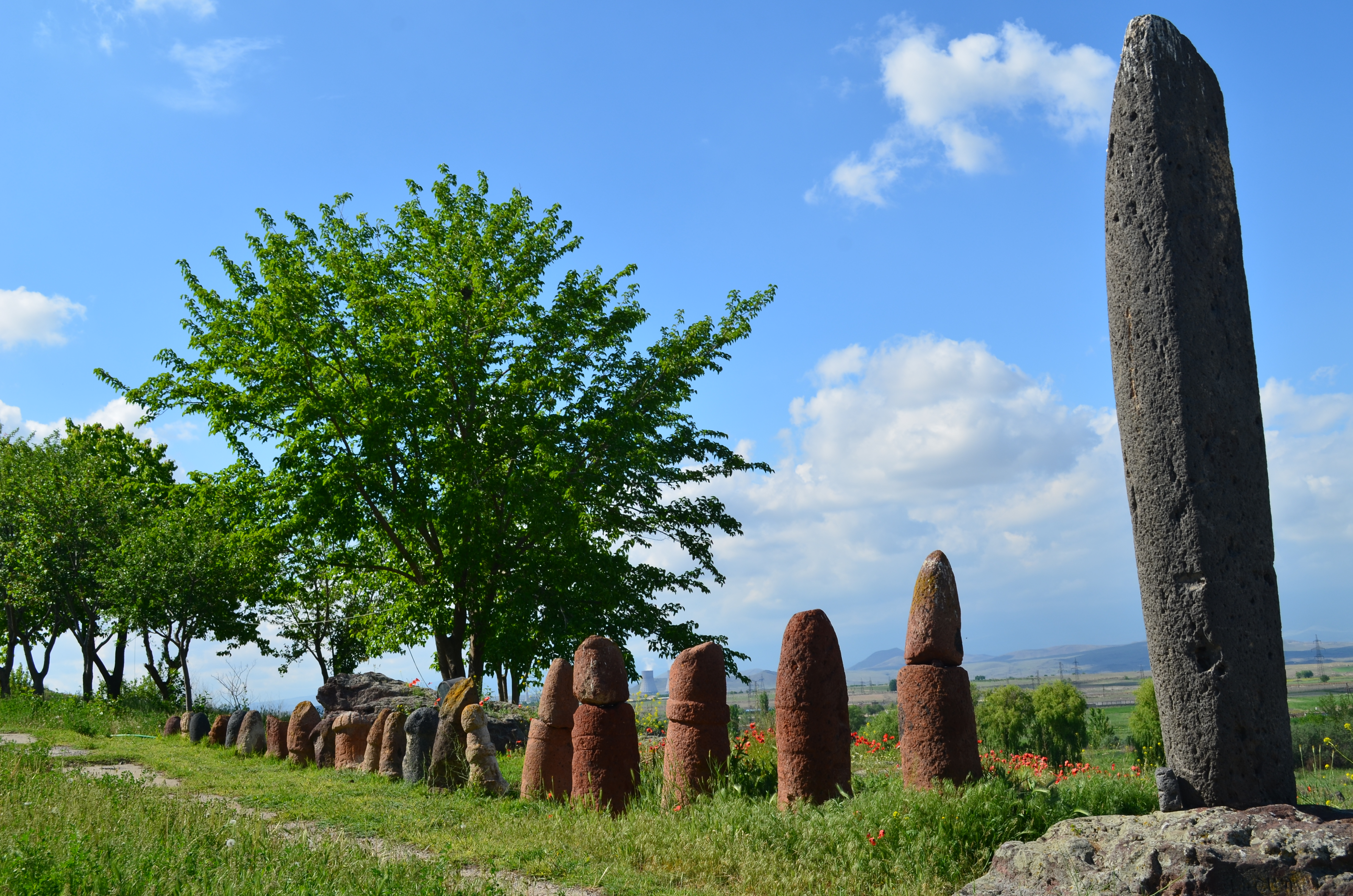
- From the top to bottom-right: Bagaran, Zvartnots Cathedral Ruins, Etchmiadzin Cathedral, Statue of Komitas in Vagharshapat, Metsamor Site

- Location of Armavir within Armenia
- Coordinates: 40°09′N 44°03′E
- Country: Armenia
- Capital Largest city: Armavir; Vagharshapat

Government
  - Governor: Argishti Mekhakyan

Area
  - Total: 1,231 km^{2} (475 sq mi)
  - Rank: 10th

Population (2022)
  - Total: 253,493
  - Rank: 3rd
  - Density: 205.9/km^{2} (533.3/sq mi)

GDP
  - Total: ֏ 340.604 billion (US$ 706 million)
  - Per capita: ֏ 1,284,327 (US$ 2,662)
- Time zone: AMT (UTC+04)
- Postal code: 0901-1149
- ISO 3166 code: AM.AV
- FIPS 10-4: AM03
- HDI (2022): 0.754 high · 10th
- Website: Official web

Armavir (Armenian: Արմավիր, (Note: Classical spelling: Արմաւիր) Armenian pronunciation: [ɑɾmɑˈviɾ]), is a province (marz) in the western part of Armenia. Located in the Ararat plain dominated by Mount Ararat from the south and Mount Aragats from the north, the province's capital is the town of Armavir while the largest city is Vagharshapat (Etchmiadzin). The province shares a 72 km (45 mi)-long border with Turkey to the south and west.

The province is home to the spiritual centre of the Armenian nation; the Mother See of Holy Etchmiadzin of the Armenian Apostolic Church. It is the seat of the Catholicos of All Armenians.

The province is named after the ancient city of Armavir founded in 331 BC. The province is also the site of the decisive Battle of Sardarabad in 1918 that resulted in the foundation of the Republic of Armenia. The battle is seen as a crucial historical event not only in stopping the Turkish advance into the rest of Armenia but also preventing the complete destruction of the Armenian nation.

The Metsamor Nuclear Power Plant is also located in Armavir Province near the town of Metsamor.

The Yerevan Zvartnots International Airport is located near the village of Parakar in Armavir Province (12 km (7 mi) west of Yerevan).

== Etymology ==
The province is named after the ancient city of Armavir, one of the 13 historic capitals of Armenia. According to Movses Khorenatsi, ancient Armavir was built by Aramayis; the grandson of Hayk, who moved from Taron to the Ararat plain.

== Geography ==
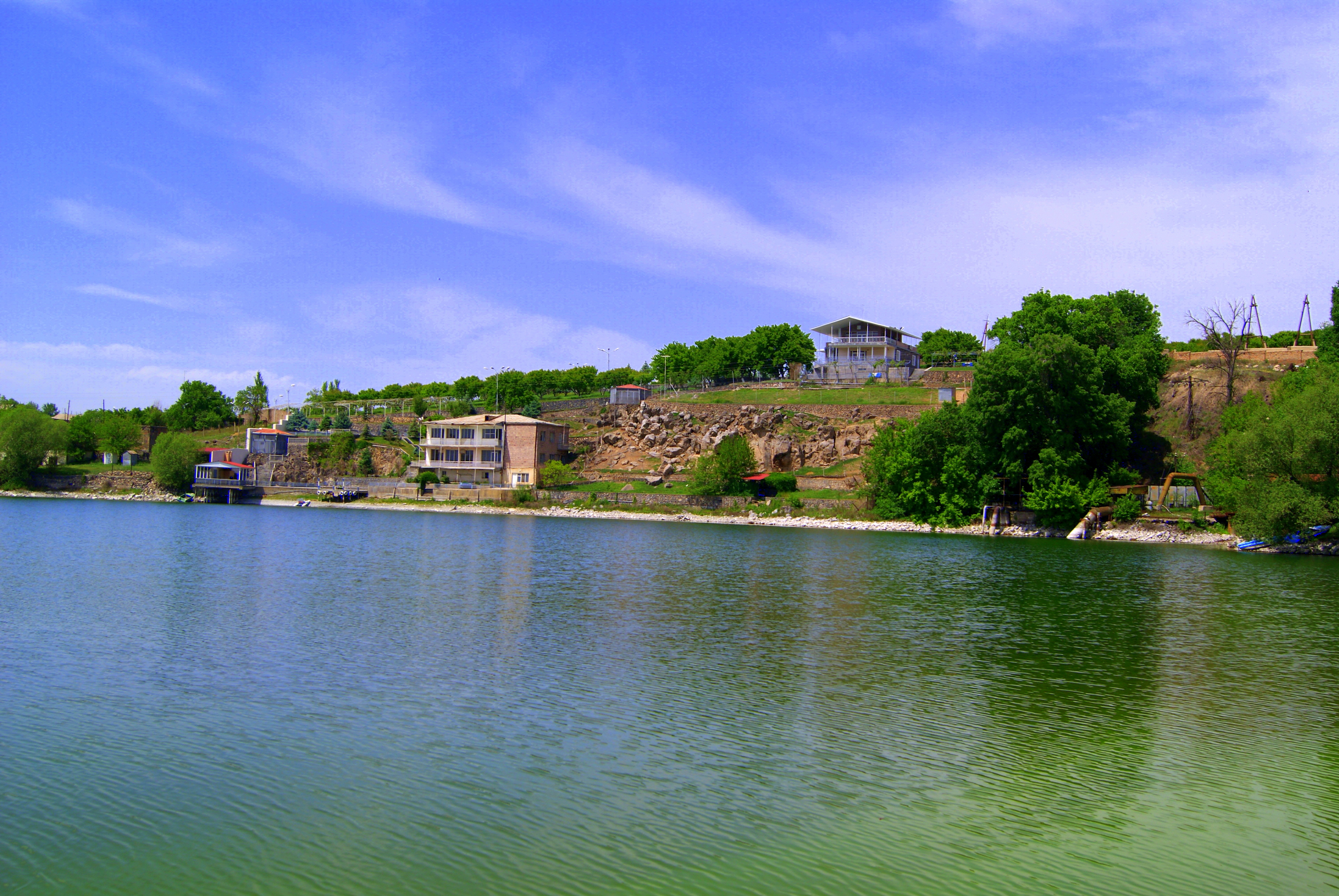
Lake Ayger, Aknalich

Armavir has an area of 1,242 km^{2} (4.2% of total area of Armenia) making it the smallest province of the country in terms of the total area. It is bordered by the Turkish provinces of Kars from the west and Iğdır from the south, with a length of 130.5 km borderline, where Aras River separates Armenia from Turkey. Domestically, it is bordered by Aragatsotn Province from the north, Ararat Province from the east and the capital Yerevan from the northeast.

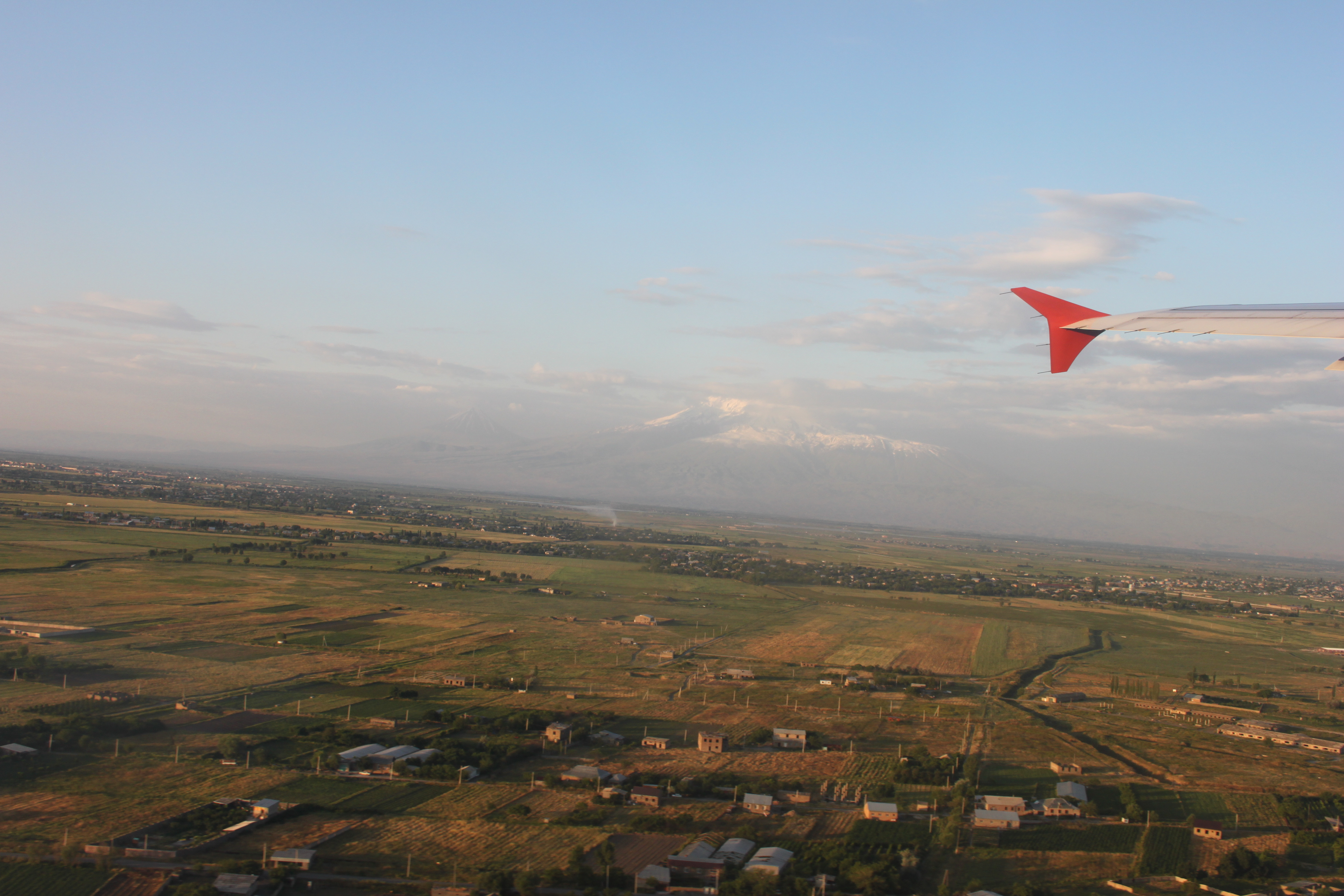
Aerial view of Ararat plain in the Armavir region

Historically, the current territory of the province mainly occupies the canton of Aragatsotn, along with small parts of Arsharunik and Masyatsotn cantons of the Ayrarat province of Ancient Armenia.

The province is entirely located at the heart of the Ararat plain, mainly consisted of agricultural lands, with an average height of 850 meters above sea level, with some plains reaching up to 1,200 meters.

Metsamor river (also known as Sevjur river) is the only river that originates from the province. The small lake of Ayger located near the Aknalich village, is among the few water surfaces of the province.

Armavir Province is characterized with dry continental climate, with hot summers and mildly cold winters.

== History ==
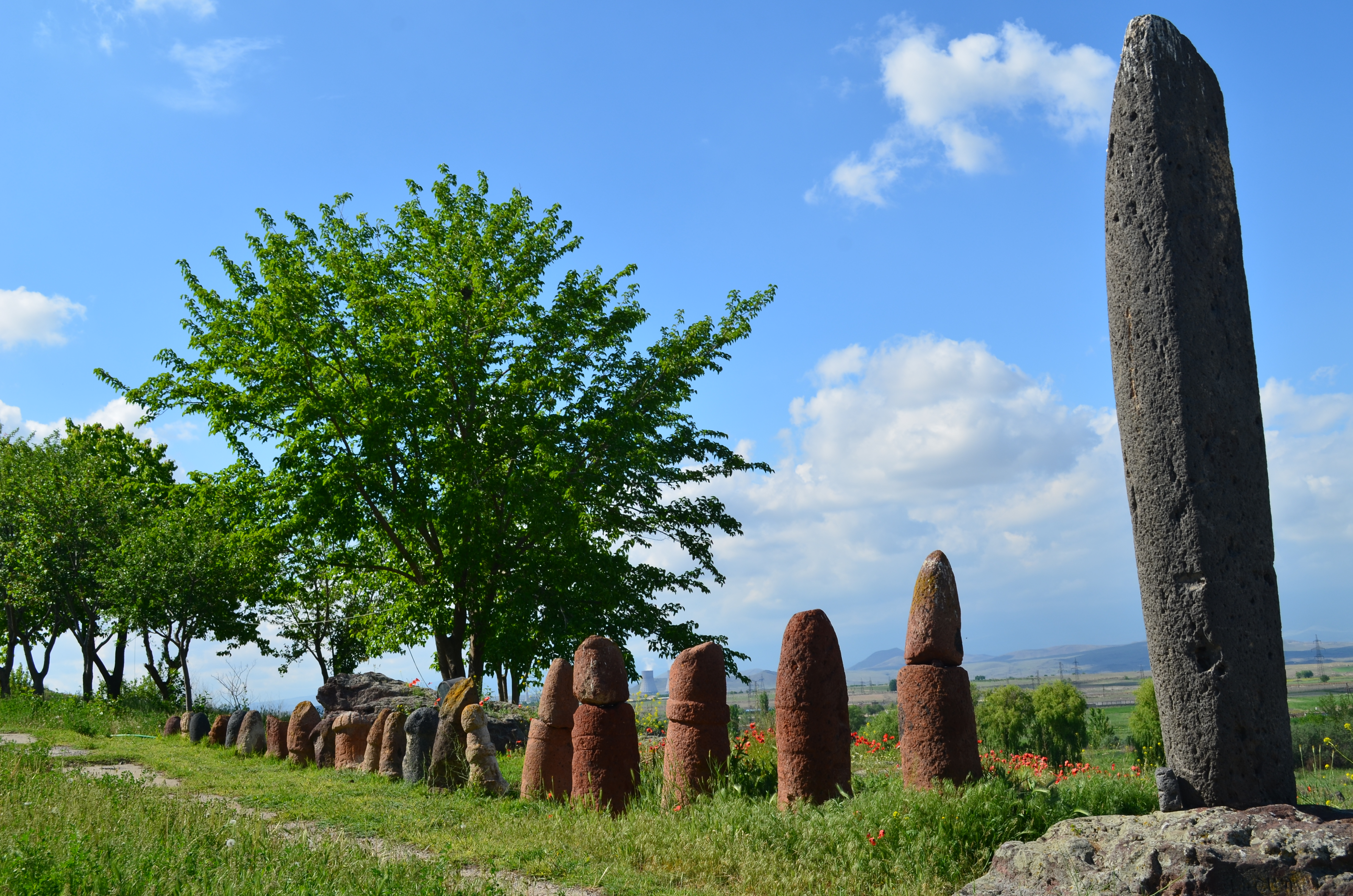
Standing stones at the ruins of Metsamor Castle dating back to the 5th millennium BC

The territory of ancient Armavir was inhabited since the 5th millennium BC. Many sites including the Metsamor Castle, Shresh hill and Mokhrablur hill date back to the Neolithic period. The ancient Urartian settlement of Argishtikhinili was founded in 776 BC by king Argishti I. One of the oldest written records about the region was found in the inscriptions left by the Urartian king Rusa II (685–645 BC). It is believed that the town of Vagharshapat was founded by king Rusa II in 685 BC as Kuarlini (Կուարլինի).

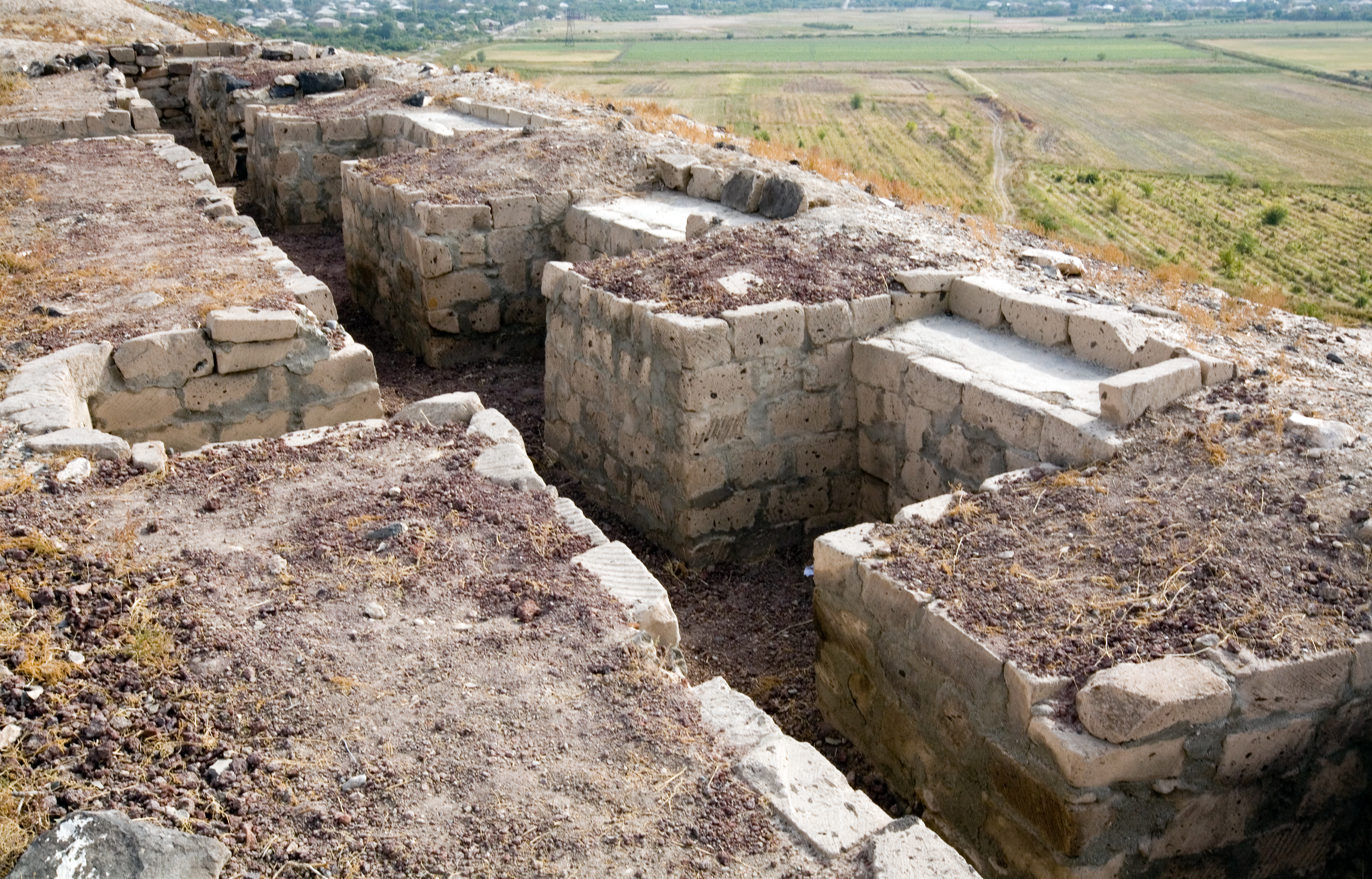
Reconstructed walls of ancient Argishtikhinili

According to Movses Khorenatsi, the territories of modern-day Armavir Province mainly occupy the central part of the historic Ayrarat province at the centre of the Armenian Highland. It contains parts of the Aragatsotn canton along with small parts of the Arsharunik and Masyatsotn. The territory was among the most important regions of ancient Armenia since the Urartu period. Its strategic importance had significantly grown with the establishment of the Kingdom of Armenia in 331 BC by the Orontid dynasty.

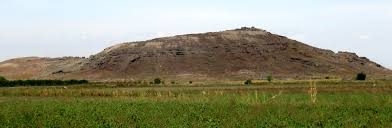
The site of ancient Armavir

3 of the historic capital of Armenia are located in modern-day Armavir. The ancient city of Armavir became the capital in 331 BC until 210 BC. It was replaced by the nearby city of Yervandashat which remained the capital of the kingdom until 176 BC, under the reign of the Artaxiad dynasty. Between 120 and 330 AD, the capital of the kingdom was the city of Vagharshapat under the Arsacid dynasty.

After the Christianization of Armenia in 301, Vagharshapat became the spiritual centre of the Armenians worldwide. In 405, Mesrop Mashtots introduced the newly created Armenian alphabet to the Armenians in Vagharshapat. After the fall of the Armenian Kingdom in 428, the region became part of the Sasanian Empire of Persia until the Arab conquest of Armenia in the mid-7th century.

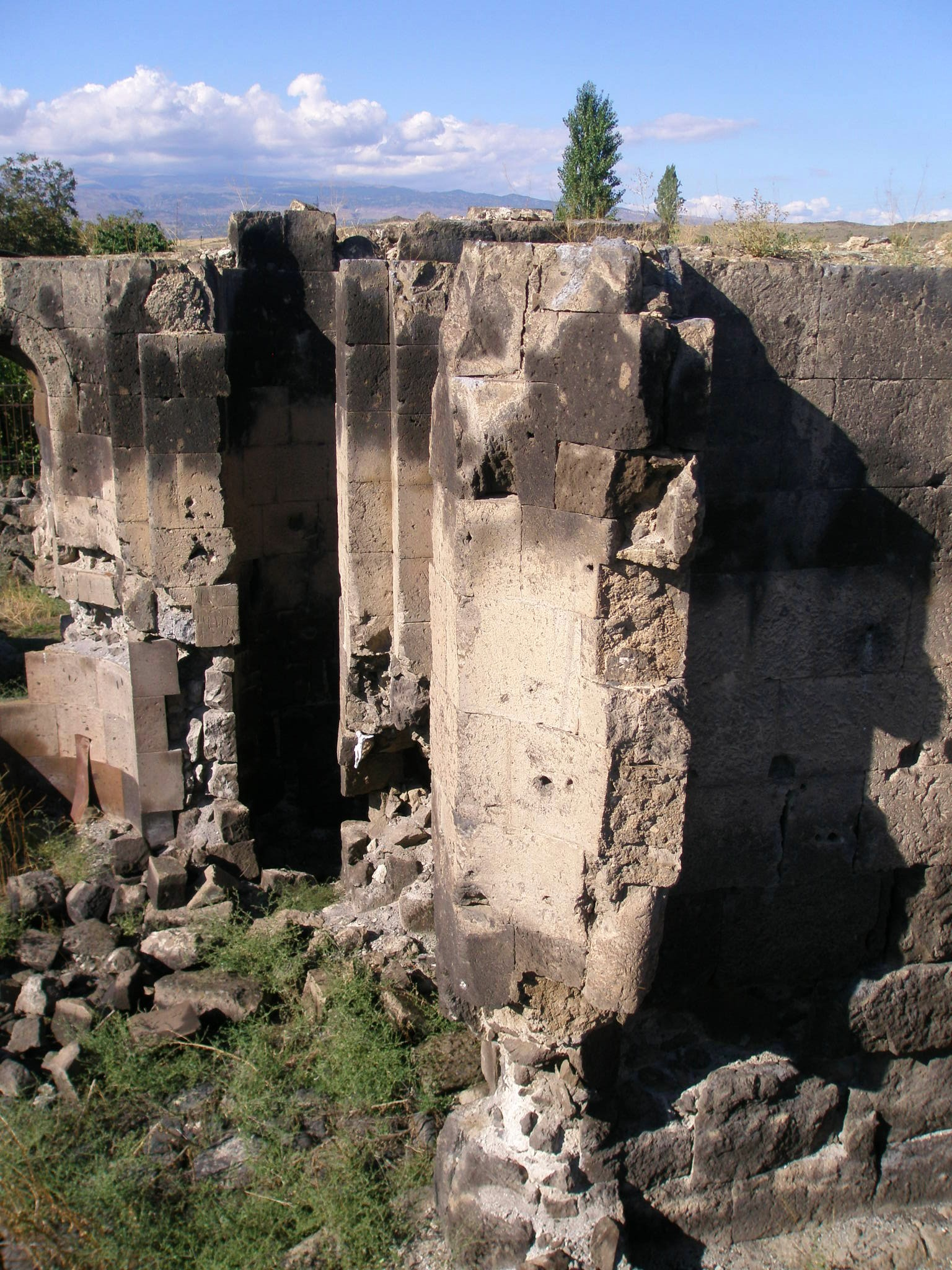
The ruins of Targmanchats monastery of Aygeshat, 6th-7th centuries

By the end of the 9th century, the region became part of the newly established Bagratid Kingdom of Armenia. Between the 11th and 15th centuries, the region suffered from the Seljuk, Mongol, Ag Qoyunlu and Kara Koyunlu invasions, respectively. However, the town of Vagharshapat restored its importance in 1441 when the seat of the Armenian Catholicosate was transferred from the Cilician city of Sis back to Etchmiadzin.

At the beginning of the 16th century, the territory of modern-day Armavir became part of the Erivan Beglarbegi within the Safavid Persia except brief Ottoman rules during Ottoman-Persian Wars between 1514 and 1736. During the first half of the 18th century, the territory became part of the Erivan Khanate under the rule of the Afsharid dynasty and later under the Qajar dynasty of Persia. It remained under the Persian rule until 1827–1828, when Eastern Armenia was ceded by the Russian Empire as a result of the Russo-Persian War of 1826–28 and the signing of the Treaty of Turkmenchay.

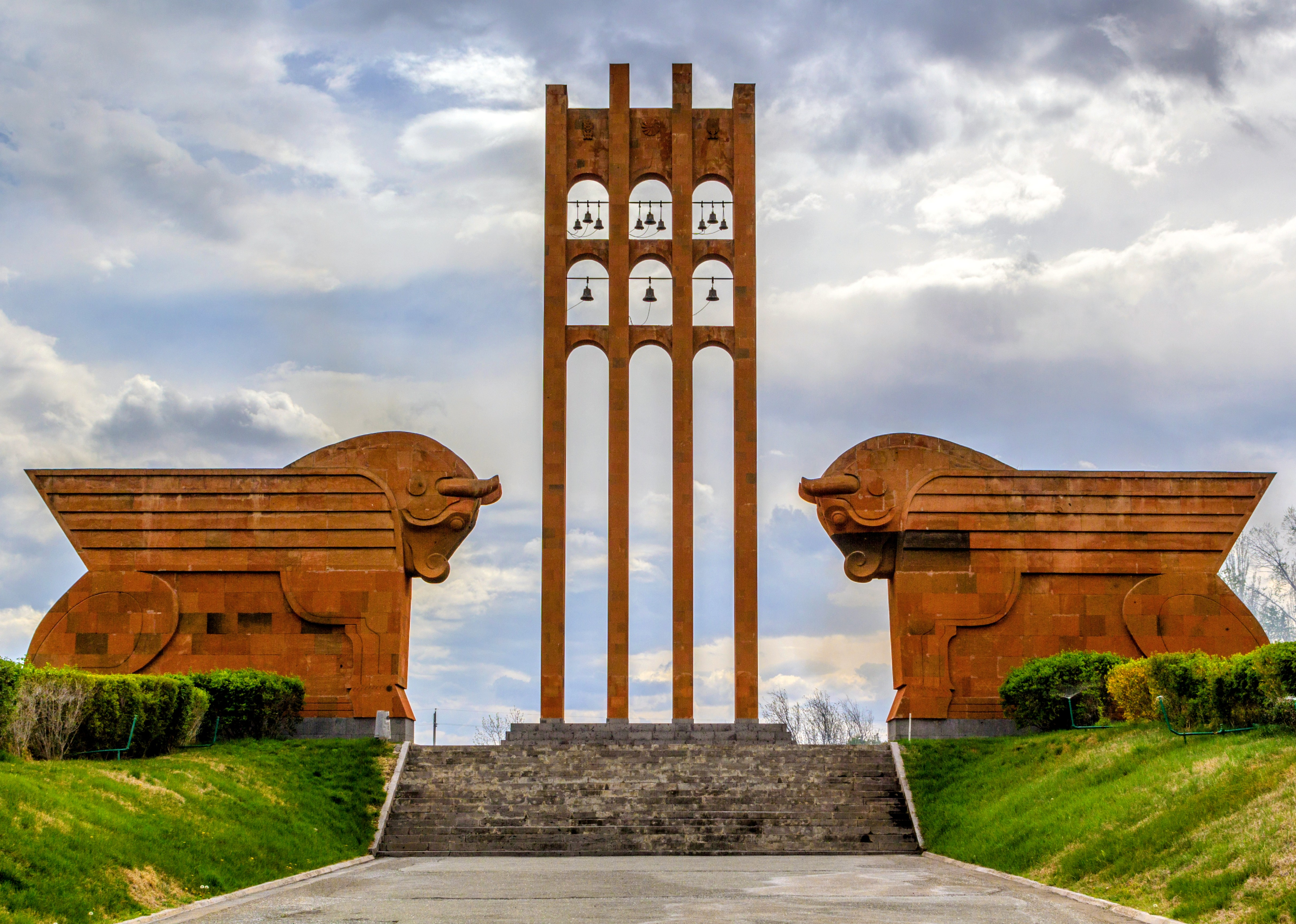
The memorial dedicated to the Armenian victory at the battle of Sardarabad near Araks

After the fall of the Russian Empire in 1917, the Ottoman Army intended to crush Armenia and seize the Russian Transcaucasia and the oil wells of Baku. In May 1918, the Ottoman forces attacked Eastern Armenia in 3 fronts. At the northern front, the Ottomans reached Karakilisa (nowadays Vanadzor) on May 20 almost without resistance. The 2nd front was through the town of Aparan while the 3rd and largest front was through the town of Sardarabad (nowadays Araks) in the Armavir region. On May 21, the detachment of Zihni Bey defeated an Armenian unit composed of 600 infantry and 250 cavalry, and then took over Sardarabad. Afterwards, the Ottoman forces advanced towards the village of Yeghegnut. The Armenian offensive led by Daniel Bek-Pirumian and Movses Silikyan was launched in 22 May. As a result of the decisive Armenian victories over the Turks on the 3 fronts of Sardarabad, Abaran, and Gharakilisa, the Armavir region became part of the independent Armenia by the end of May 1918.

After 2 years of brief independence, Armenia became part of the Soviet Union in December 1920. From 1930 until 1995, modern-day Armavir was divided into 3 raions within the Armenian SSR: Baghramyan raion, Hoktemberyan raion, and Etchmiadzin raion. With the territorial administration reform of 1995, the 3 raions were merged to form the Armavir Province.

== Demographics ==
=== Population ===
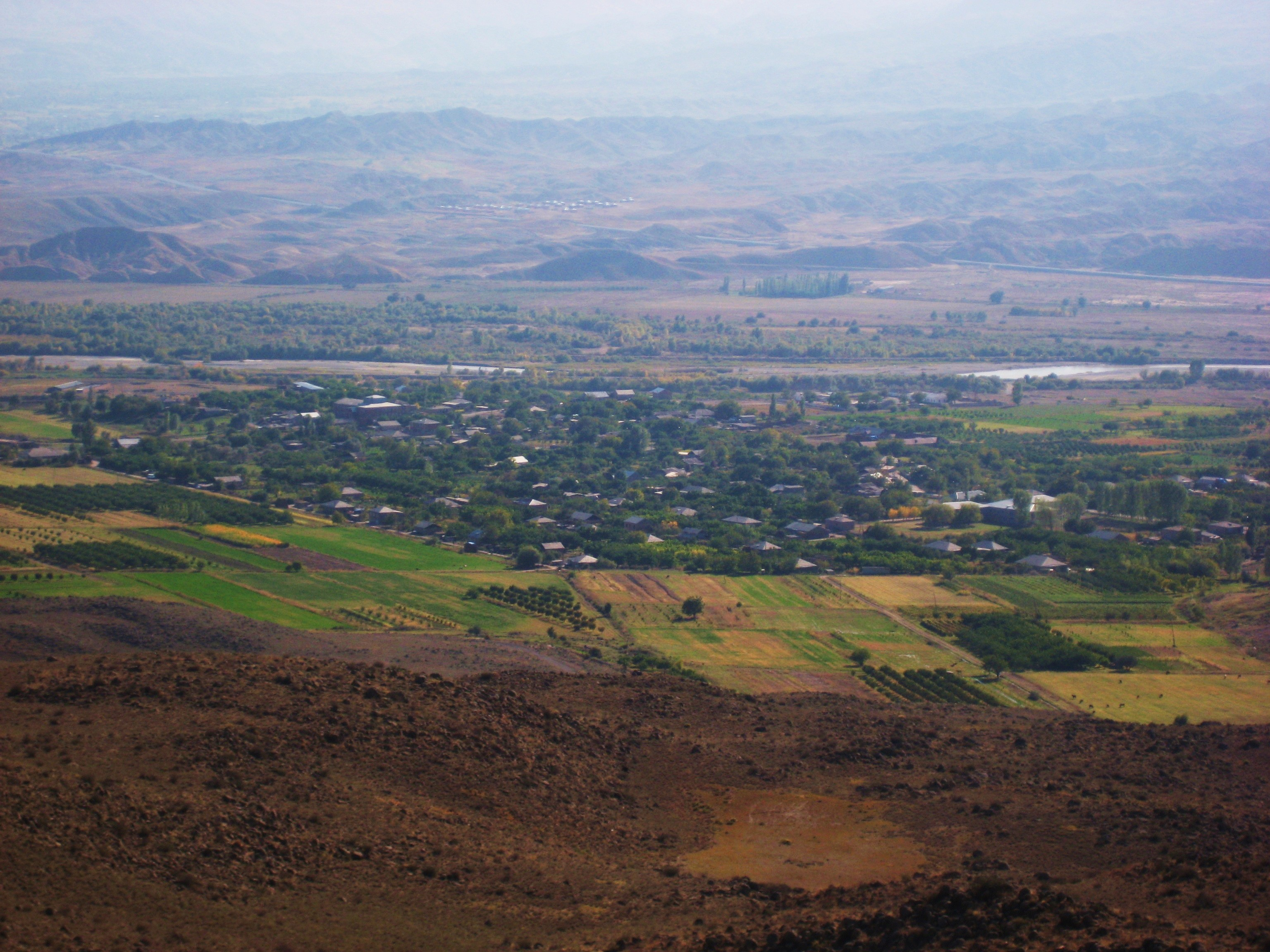
The village of Yervandashat. The heights in the background are the site of ancient Yervandashat

According to the 1989 Soviet census, the Armavir Province (then part of the Baghramyan, Armavir, and Etchmiadzin districts in 1930–1995) had a population of 291,647. 107,397 or 36.82% of which was urban, distributed in the cities of Hoktemberyan (46,857) and Etchmiadzin (60,540), and 184,250 or 63.18% were rural, distributed in the districts of Baghramyan (20,438), Armavir (84,314), and Etchmiadzin (79,498).

According to the 2022 official census, Armavir has a population of 253,493 (122,939 men and 126,043 women), forming around 8.6% of the entire population of Armenia. The urban population is 80,779 (31.9%) and the rural is 172,714 (68.1%). The province has 3 urban and 94 rural communities. The largest urban community is the town of Vagharshapat (Etchmiadzin), with a population of 44,837. The other urban centres are Armavir and Metsamor.

With a population of 5,584, the village of Parakar is the largest rural municipality of Armavir.

=== Ethnic groups and religion ===
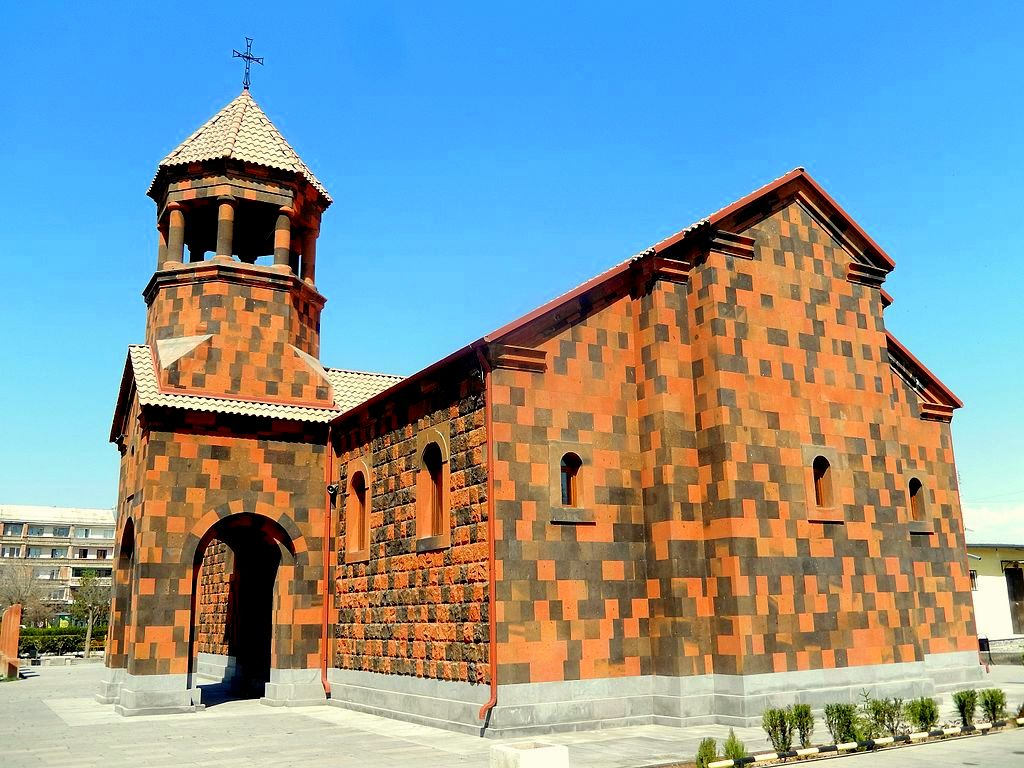
Saint Gregory of Narek Cathedral

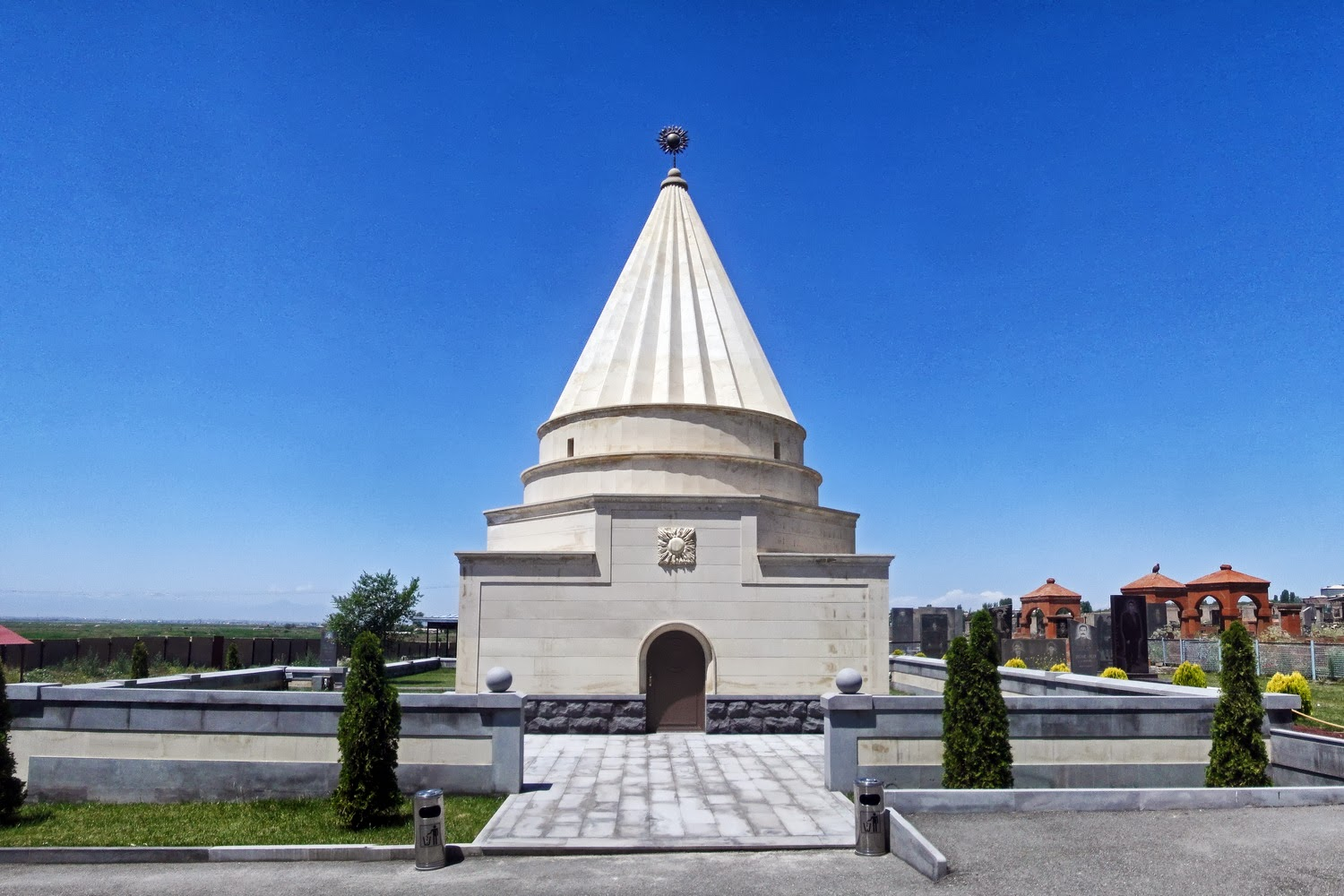
The Yazidi Temple of Aknalich

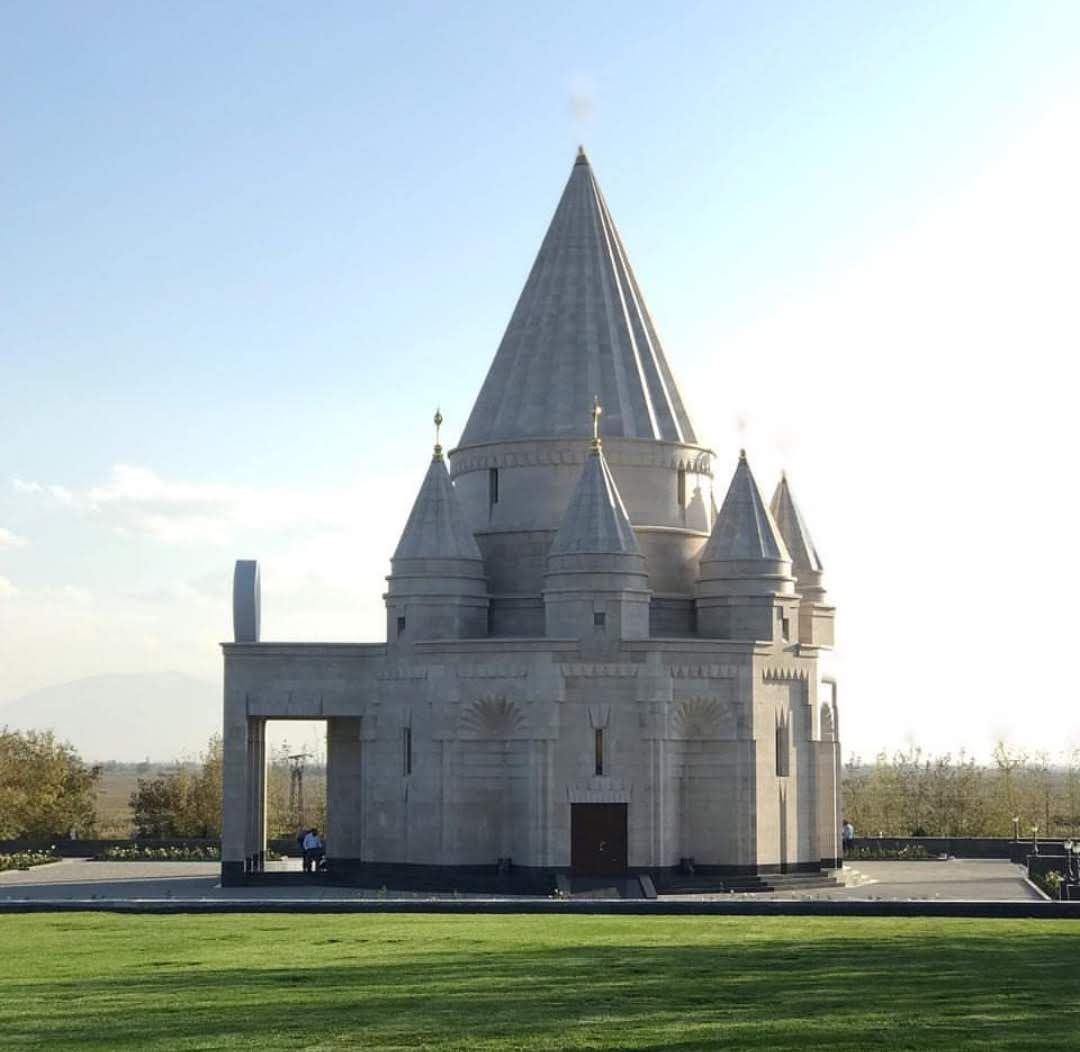
Quba Mere Diwane temple

The majority of the Armavir Province population are ethnic Armenians who belong to the Armenian Apostolic Church. The regulating body of the church is the Diocese of Armavir, headed by Bishop Sion Adamyan. The Saint Gregory of Narek Cathedral in the town of Armavir is the seat of the diocese.

However, there is a significant number of Yazidis in Armavir totaling around 17,000 people, mainly in the villages of Zartonk, Yeraskhahun, Nalbandyan, Yeghegnut, Artashar, Nor Artagers and the small village of Ferik where the Yazidis form the majority. The village of Aknalich is the site of the largest Yazidi temple in the world, known as Quba Mere Diwane, which was opened in the village in September 2019.

The village of Nor Artagers is also home to a small Assyrian community totaling around 260 people. They belong to the Assyrian Church of the East.

== Administrative divisions ==
Armavir Province is currently divided into 7 communities (hamaynkner), formed as a result of the local elections held on December 5, 2021, in the province :

- A cross denotes a town (urban settlement), otherwise, the settlements are villages (rural settlements).

Municipality	Area (km^{2})	Population (2022 census)	Centre	Settlements
Araks		23,774	Jrarat	Aknashen, Apaga, Araks (Vagharshapat), Aratashen, Artimet, Gai, Griboyedov, Haykashen, Jrarbi, Khoronk, Lusagyugh, Metsamor
Armavir		50,135	Armavir†	
Baghramyan		15,240	Baghramyan	
Khoy		26,263	Geghakert	
Metsamor		64,976	Metsamor†	
Parakar		25,310	Parakar	
Vagharshapat		47,446	Vagharshapat†	Voskehat
Ferik		349	Ferik	

Rural communities and included settlements:

- Aghavnatun
- Aknalich
- Alashkert
- Amasia
- Amberd
- Aragats
- Araks (Armavir)
- Arazap
- Arevadasht
- Arevashat
- Arevik
- Argavand
- Argina
- Armavir
- Arshaluys
- Artamet
- Artashar
- Aygek
- Aygeshat (Armavir)
- Aygeshat (Vagharshapat)
- Aygevan
- Bagaran
- Baghramyan (Armavir)
- Baghramyan (Vagharshapat)
- Bambakashat
- Berkashat
- Dalarik
- Dasht
- Doghs
- Getashen
- Hatsik
- Haykavan
- Haytagh
- Hovtamej
- Hushakert
- Janfida
- Jrashen
- Karakert
- Khanjyan
- Koghbavan
- Kyurakyan
- Lenughi
- Lernagog
- Lernamerdz
- Lukashin
- Margara
- Mayisyan
- Merdzavan
- Mrgastan
- Mrgashat
- Mugam
- Musaler
- Myasnikyan
- Nalbandyan
- Norakert
- Nor Armavir
- Nor Artagers
- Nor Kesaria
- Norapat
- Noravan
- Parakar
  - Tairov
- Pshatavan
- Ptghunk
- Sardarapat
- Shahumyan
- Shahumyani trchnafabrika
- Shenavan
- Shenik
- Talvorik
- Tandzut
- Taronik
- Tsaghkalanj
- Tsaghkunk
- Tsiatsan
- Vanand
- Vardanashen
- Yeghegnut
- Yeraskhahun
- Yervandashat
- Zartonk

== Culture ==
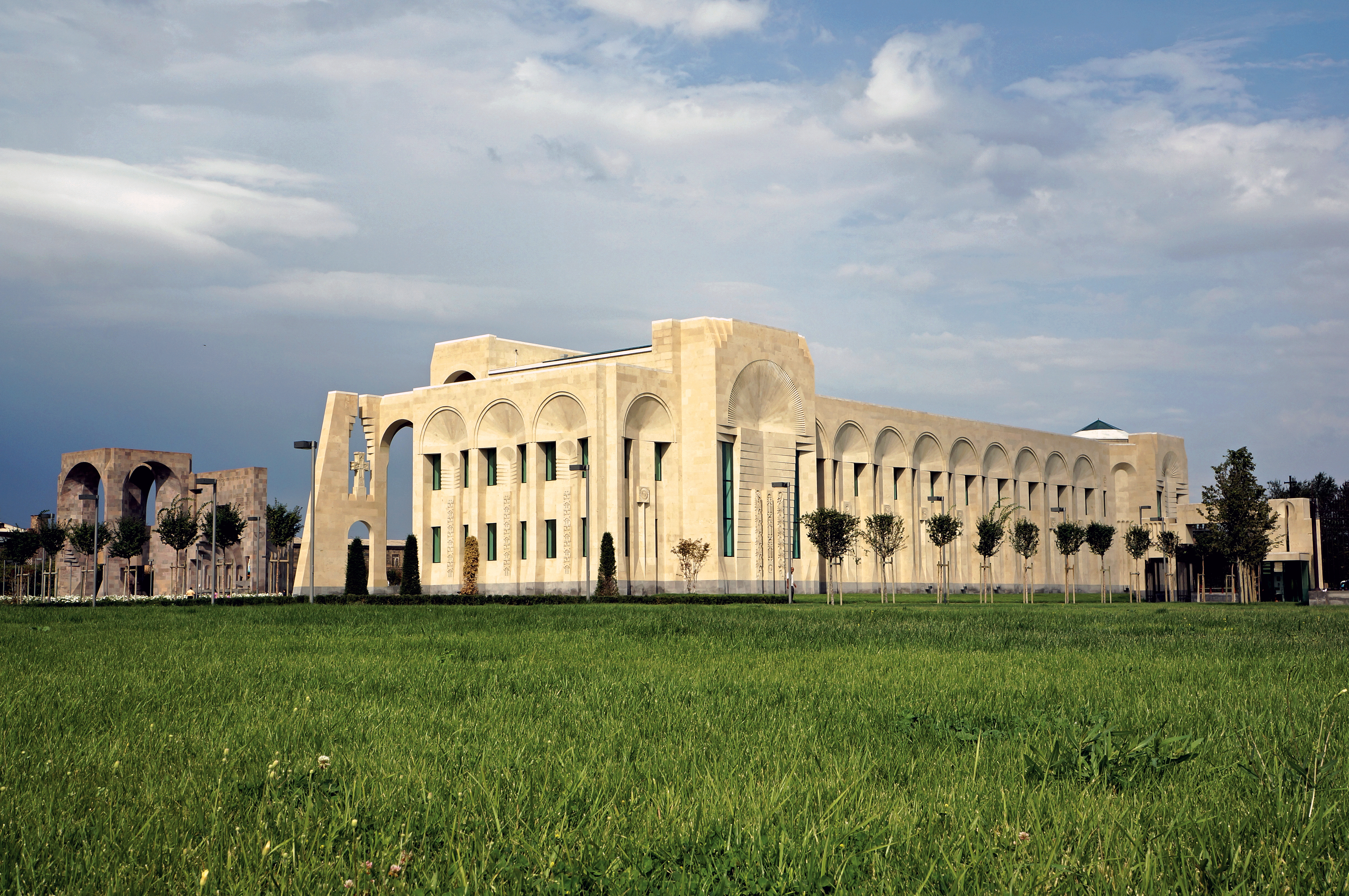
Vatche and Tamar Manoukian Manuscript Depository

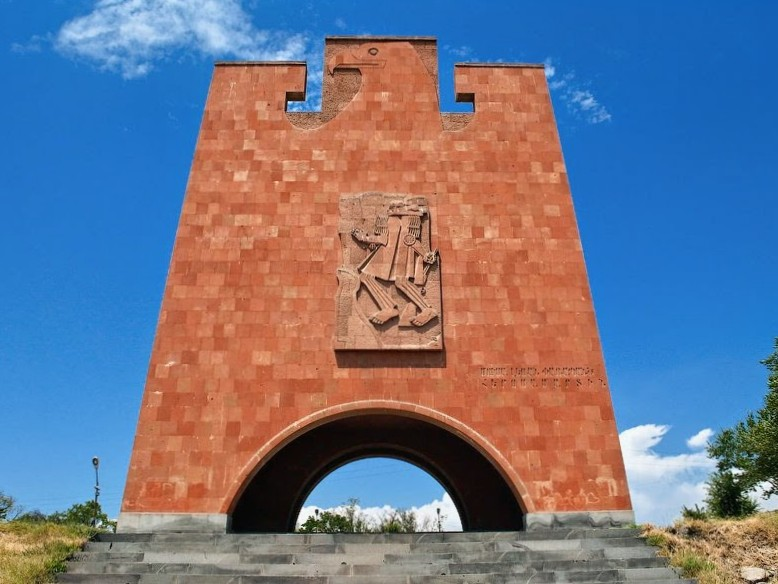
Musa Dagh resistance memorial

Armavir is among the richest cultural centres of the Republic of Armenia. The urban settlements of the province are home to cultural palaces as well as many public libraries. However, during the Soviet period, there were 98 public libraries in Armavir with only 21 of them are still functioning.

The town of Vagharshapat is home to a large number of museums including the Vagharshapat ethnographic museum, Khoren Ter-Harutyunyan museum and art gallery, Mher Abeghian museum and art gallery, and Hovhannes Hovhannisyan house-museum. Many museums and libraries are housed in the complex of the Mother See of Holy Etchmiadzin, including:

- Etchmiadzin Cathedral Museum,
- Catholicosal Museum,
- Khrimian Museum,
- Alex and Marie Manoogian Treasury House,
- Vatche and Tamar Manoukian Manuscript Depository,
- Printing house and Bookstore of the Mother See.
- Rouben Sevak Museum

The village of Musaler is home to the annual celebration of the Musa Dagh resistance, when thousands of Armenians from all over the world arrive in the village each year during the month of September, to celebrate the event around the Musa Dagh memorial.

The Sardarapat Memorial complex, including the Armenia Ethnography Museum is located in the village of Araks, around 10 km southwest of the provincial centre Armavir.

=== Fortresses and archaeological sites ===
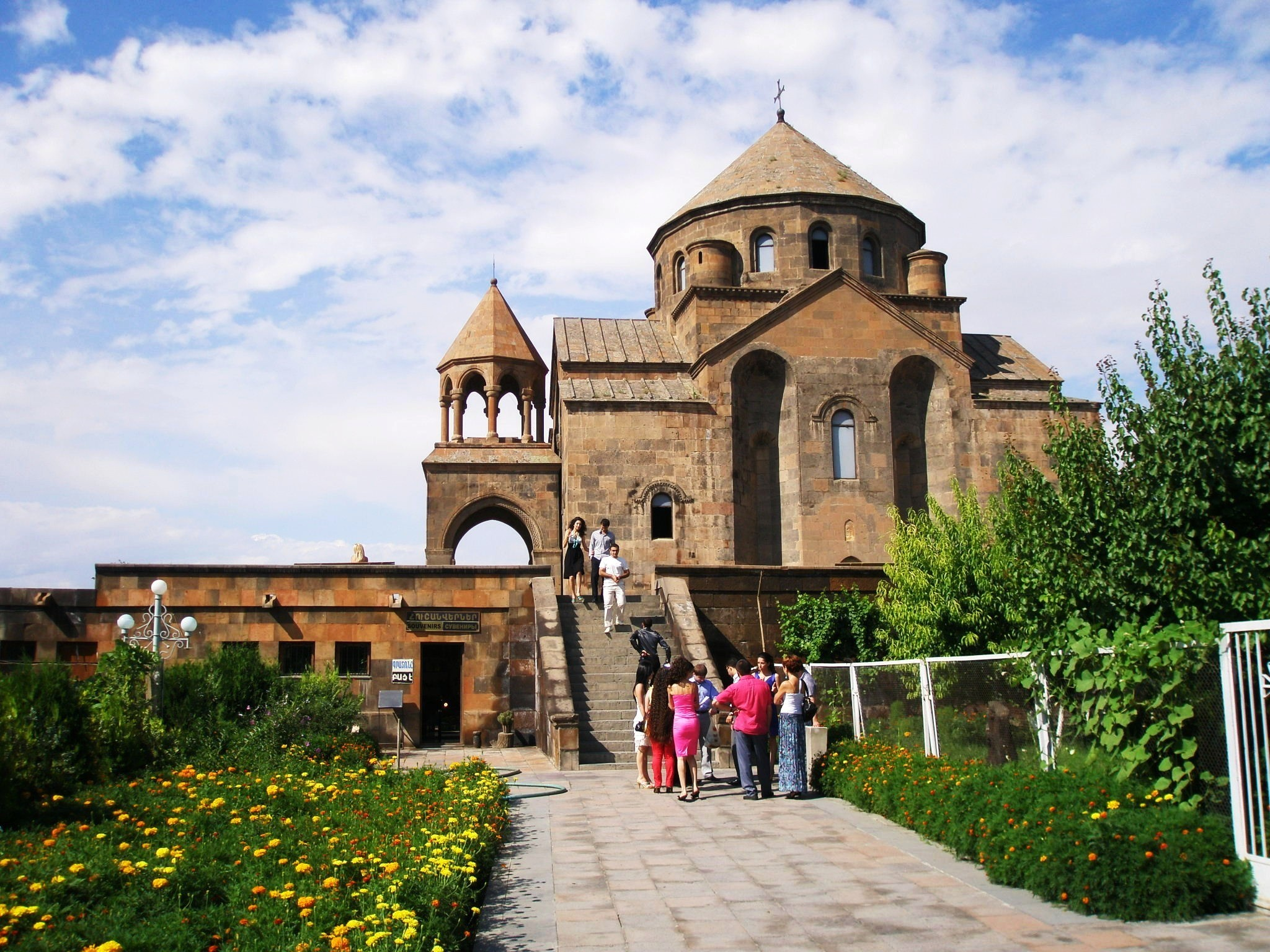
Saint Hripsimé Church of 618, a UNESCO World heritage site

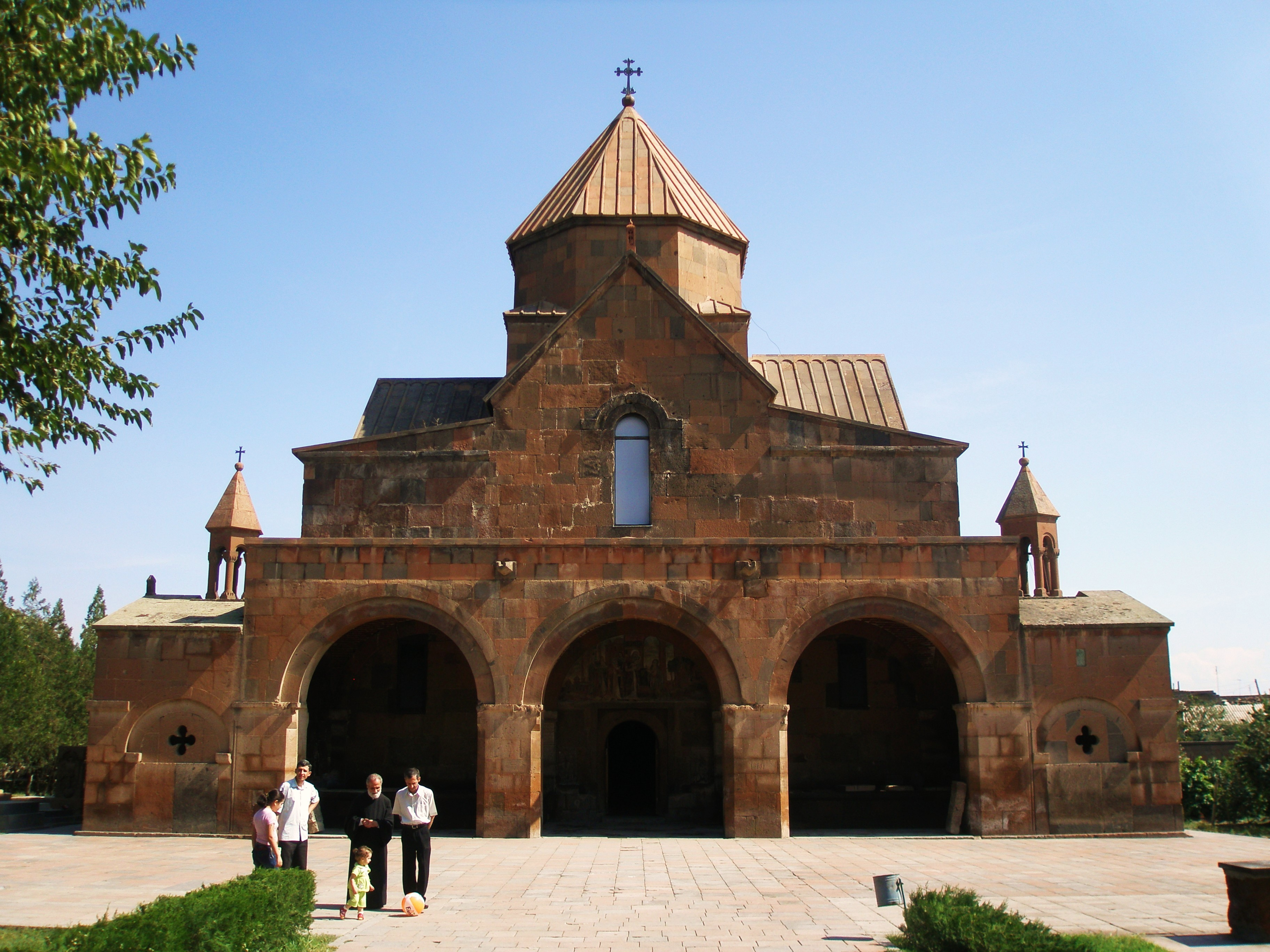
Saint Gayane Church of 630, a UNESCO World heritage site

- Metsamor archaeological site of Taronik, 5th millennium BC,
- Mokhrablur settlement in Griboyedov, 2nd millennium BC,
- Argishtikhinili ancient city, 8th century BC,
- Shenik, 5th to rd centuries BC.
- Armavir ancient city, founded in 331 BC.

=== Churches and monasteries ===
- Mother See of Holy Etchmiadzin and Etchmiadzin Cathedral, founded in 303,
- Saint Hripsime Church, opened in 618,
- Saint Gayane Church, opened in 630,
- Zvartnots Cathedral, opened in 652,
- Targmanchats monastery of Aygeshat, 6th-7th centuries,
- Shoghakat Church, opened in 1694,
- Holy Mother of God Cathedral, opened in 1767.
- Surp Harutyun Church of Parakar, opened in 1855.
- Holy Mother of God Church in Sardarapat, opened in 1882.
- Holy Mother of God Church in Bambakashat, opened in 1901

== Transportation ==
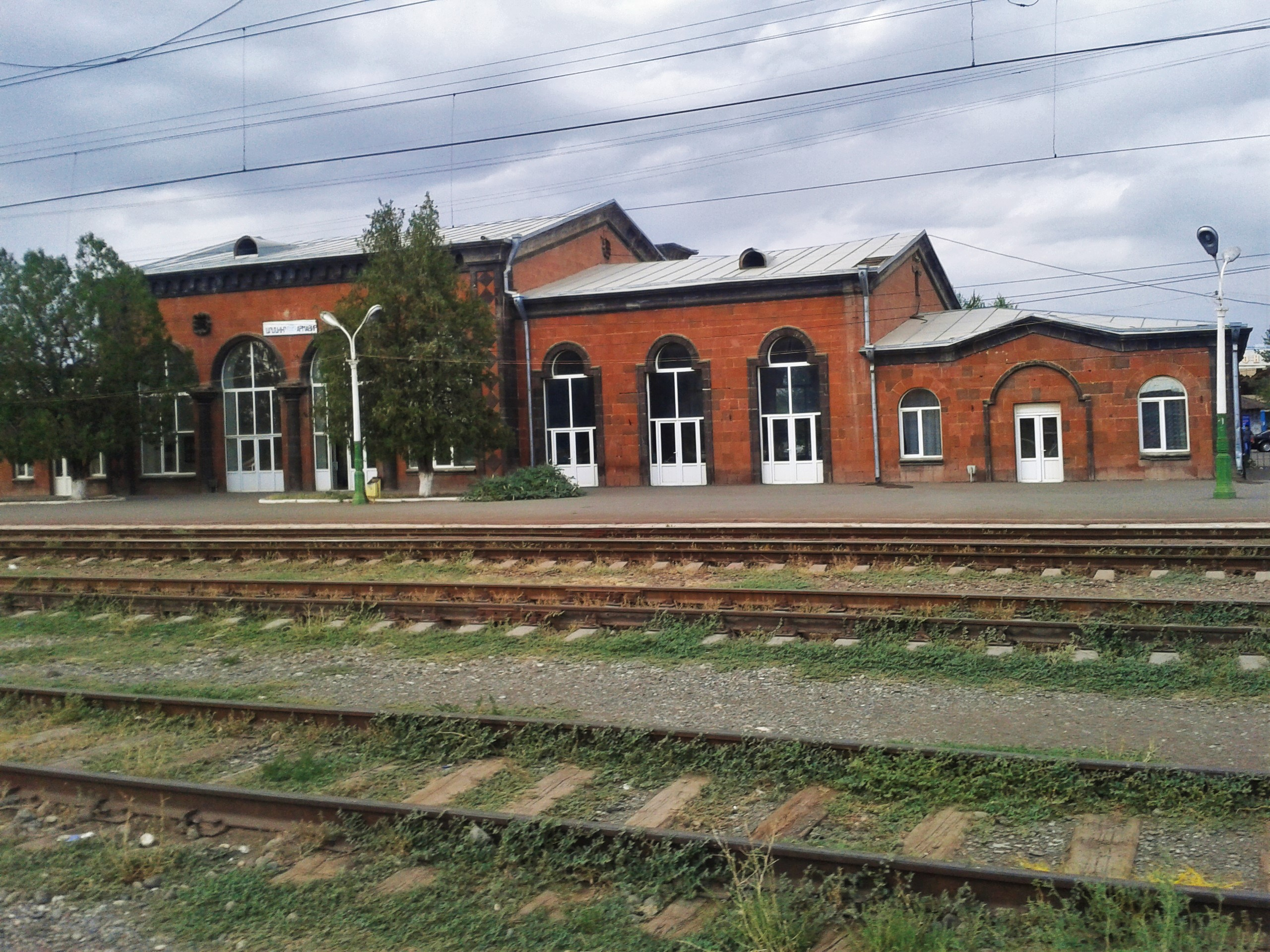
Armavir railway station

The Zvartnots International Airport of Yerevan is located within the territorial boundaries of Armavir Province.

The province is connected with Yerevan and southern Armenia through the M-5 Motorway, while the M-3 Motorway connects Armavir with northern Armenia.

The town of Armavir was founded as a railway station connecting Yerevan with Gyumri and northern Armenia. The station was renovated during the 1st decade of the 21st century. In November 2009, the station was provided with an electric locomotive that connects Armavir with the Aragatsavan station and the northwestern Armenia.

== Economy ==
=== Agriculture and viticulture ===
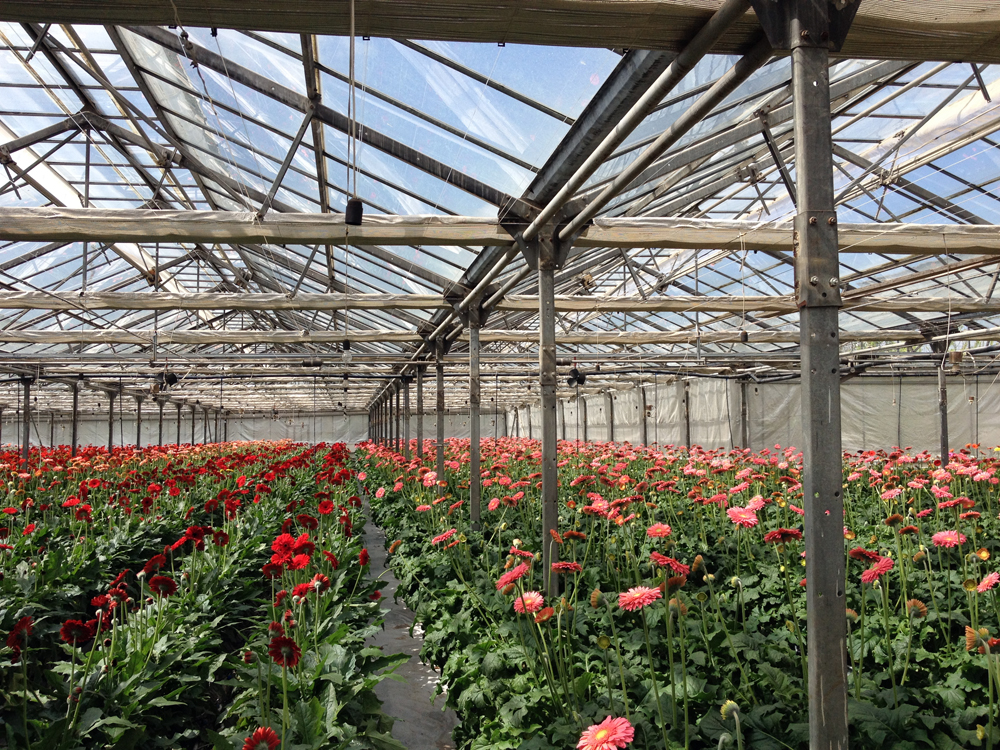
A greenhouse in Gai, Armavir

Occupying a major part of the fertile Ararat plain, Armavir Province has a major contribution in the agricultural sector of the Republic of Armenia. The economy of the province is largely based on agriculture, including farming and cattle-breeding. Around 78% (970 km^{2}) of the total area of the province are arable lands, out of which 40% (388 km^{2}) are ploughed. The main crops are grapes, apricot, peach, plum, grains, dry seeds and vegetables. Currently, the province has a contribution of 17.8% in the annual total agricultural product of Armenia. Armavir is among the leading provinces of Armenia in wine production in terms of grape cultivation and wine export (along with Ararat and Vayots Dzor).

The Baghramyan and Arax poultry farms are located in the villages of Myasnikyan and Jrarbi respectively.

Recently, fish farming has significantly developed in the province.

Starting 2004 Children of Armenia Fund started to work in Armavir region, Karakert. While asking for a glass of water from an old man sitting in front of his house, Dr. Armen learned that the villagers had to buy drinking water from the nearest city. This shock and the long conversation that followed determined Karakert as the location for Children of Armenia Fund to begin their work; starting by addressing the lack of water, heating, toilets and other infrastructure improvements necessary for communities and schools. In 2004, with the organization's first donations, COAF began the renovation of the Karakert village school.

The drastic changes in Karakert inspired nearby villages in Armavir to join COAF programs. COAF started to work in a cluster approach, grouping nearby villages for infrastructure improvements and programs. In 2006, COAF grew to 18 villages in Armavir, implementing the organization's style of community engaged programs, growing to include healthy lifestyle curriculum in schools, after school clubs, psychological support, youth empowerment, as well as professional trainings and supervision by COAF experts.

=== Industry ===
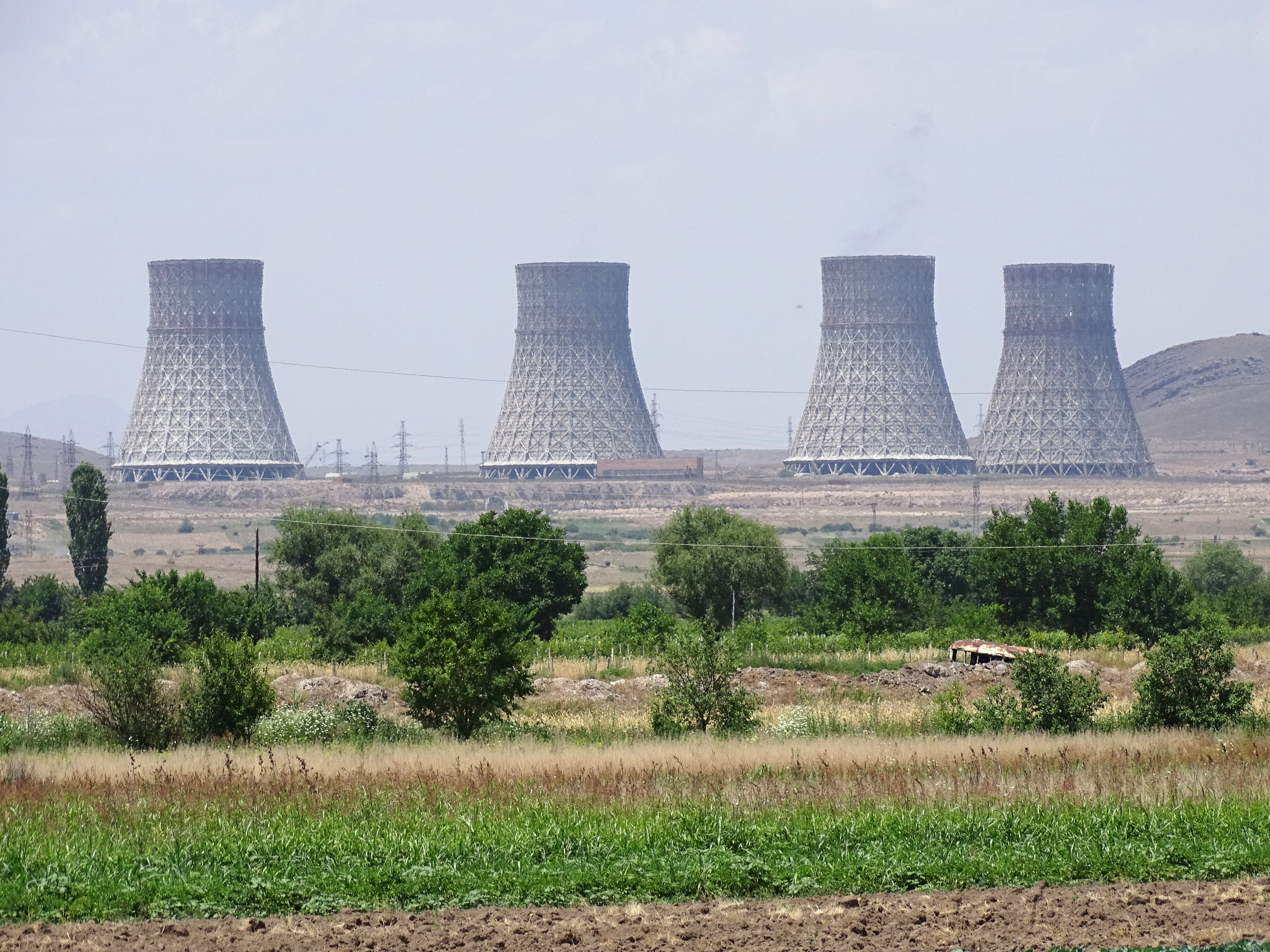
Metsamor Nuclear Power Plant

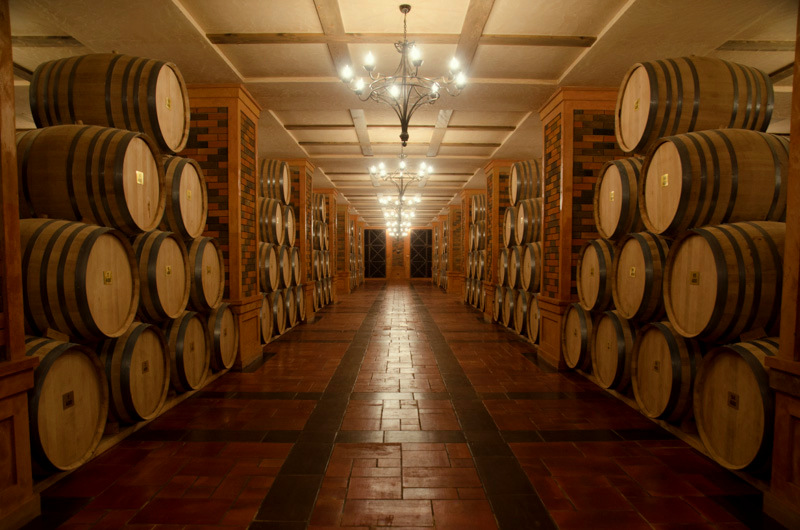
Wine cellars at MAP winery

The province has a contribution of 4% in the annual total industrial product of Armenia. The industry of the province is mainly based on food-processing and alcoholic drinks. The town of Vagharshapat was home to the 1st paper factory in the history of Armenia. In 1780, Catholicos Simeon I of Yerevan founded the Etchmiadzin Paper Factory which only served for 6 years.

The Metsamor Nuclear Power Plant is the largest plant in Armavir and the entire republic. It was opened in 1969 near the town of Metsamor and produces around 40% of the consumed electricity in Armenia.

- The ancient city of Argishtikhinili located within the territories of Armavir Province, was a major centre for wine production. Large storage areas for wine and grains were found by archaeologists within the fortifications of the ancient town dating back to the 8th century BC. The wine produced in Armavir is mainly from the vineyards of the Ararat plain.
  - Echmiadzin Winery for wine, brandy and vodka, opened in 1928 in Vagharshapat.
  - MAP Winery for brandy and wine, opened in 1942 in Lenughi.
  - Yerevan Brandy Company-Armavir branch, opened in 1966 in Armavir.
  - Merdzavan Brandy Factory for cognac, wine and vodka, opened in 1998 in Merdzavan.
  - Karas Winery (Tierras de Armenia), opened in 2003 in Arevadasht.
  - Winar Winery (Brest Wine Factory), opened in 2004 in Norapat.
  - Parakar Wine-Brandy House, opened in 2005 in Parakar.
  - Armen Alco for brandy, opened in 2008 in Aygeshat.
  - Voskeni Wines, opened in 2008 in Araks.
  - Arpenik Winery for wine and brandy, opened in 2009 in Arshaluys.
  - Alvan Alco Winery for wine and brandy, opened in 2010 in Lukashin.
  - Interalco Winery for brandy, opened in 2014 in Aygeshat.
  - Proshyan Brandy Factory-Armavir village branch, in Armavir.
- Ejmiadzin became an important industrial centre during the Soviet years. It was home to 4 major industrial firms specialized in the production of military technology. However, the productivity of the plants declined after the fall of the Soviet Union. Currently, the largest industrial firms of the town are the "Echmiadzin Instrument Making Factory" founded in 1966, the "E.P.G. Echmiadzin Cannery" founded in 1969, the "Echmiadzin Kat" dairy factory founded in 1997, the "Sonimol" plant for grains founded in 2001, and the "Ekologia V.K.H." biological waste destruction plant founded in 2009.
- Being close the capital Yerevan, the villages of Parakar and Tairov are home to a large number of small and middle-size plants, including furniture manufacturing workshops and producers of polymeric materials. The village of Musaler is home to a factory for polyethylene products and a plant for heavy-duty paper products. The village of Merdzavan has a clothing and sewing factory.

=== Tourism ===
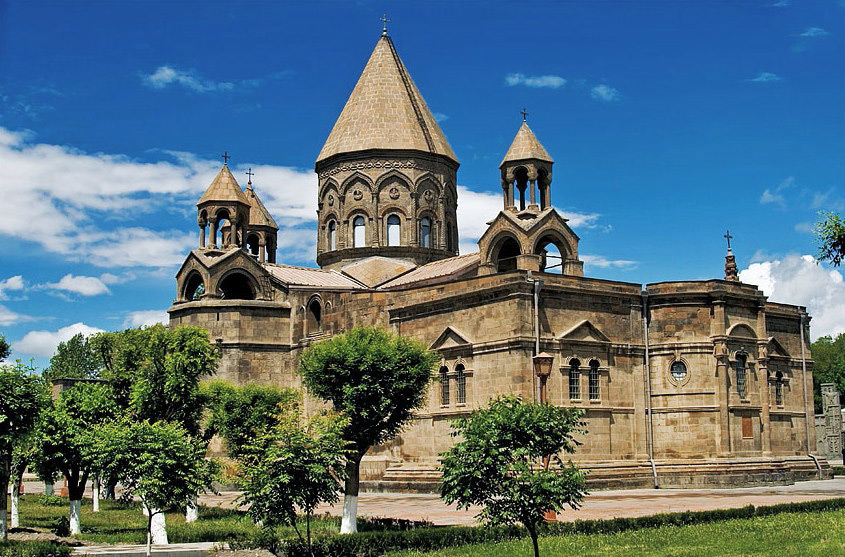
Etchmiadzin Cathedral, 303 AD, a UNESCO World Heritage Site

The province is home to the UNESCO World Heritage Sites of Etchmiadzin Cathedral, Zvartnots Cathedral, Saint Hripsime Church, Saint Gayane Church and Shoghakat Church, grouped overall as the Cathedral and Churches of Echmiatsin and the Archaeological Site of Zvartnots.

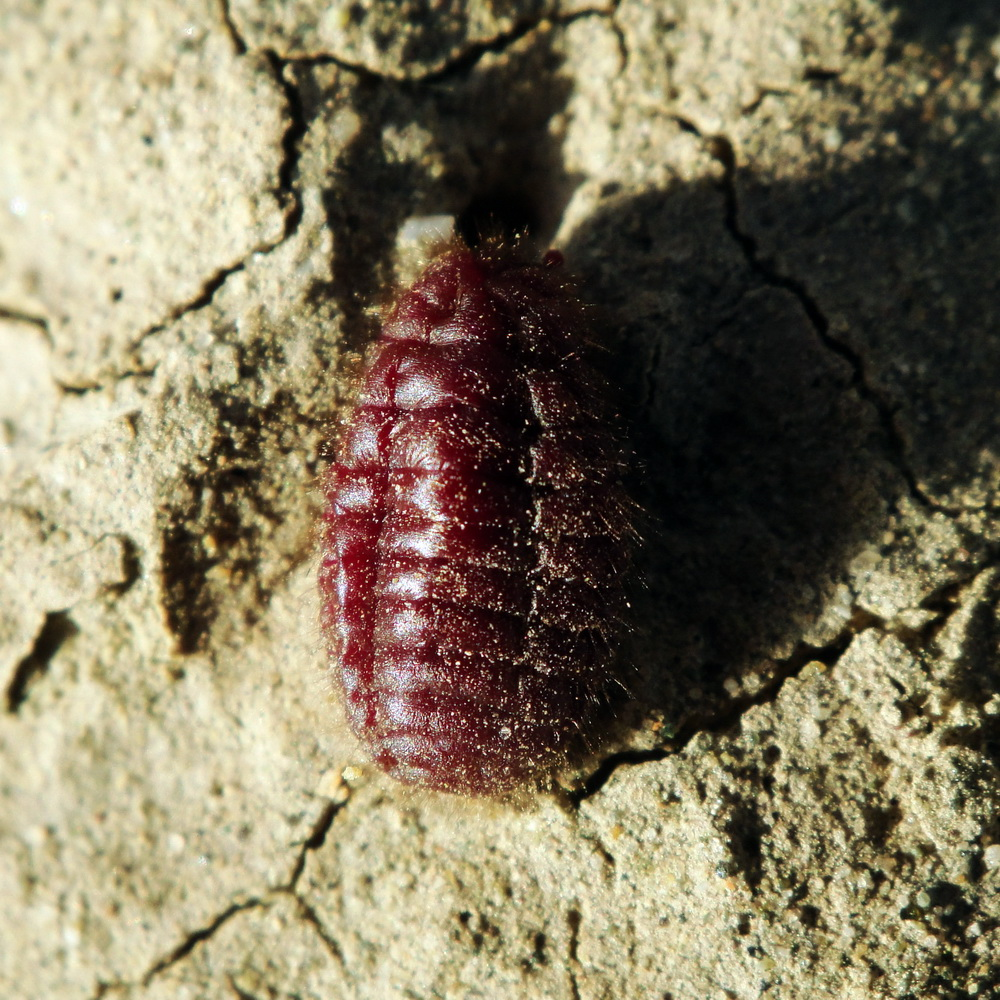
The Armenian cochineal found in the Vordan Karmir Sanctuary

Although it is the spiritual and religious centre of the Armenian nation worldwide, the tourism services in the province are not developed enough. However, being home to the Zvartnots International Airport, Parakar is home to many gambling houses and night clubs.

The Vordan Karmir Sanctuary is the only protected natural area in the province. It is home to the Armenian cochineal, an insect that formerly used to produce an eponymous crimson carmine dyestuff known in Armenia as vordan karmir. The red dye of the insect was largely used in Armenian miniatures as well as other types of artworks throughout the history of ancient and medieval Armenia.

The Sardarapat Battle Memorial and the Musa Dagh Resistance memorial are among the other major attractions of the province.

== Education ==
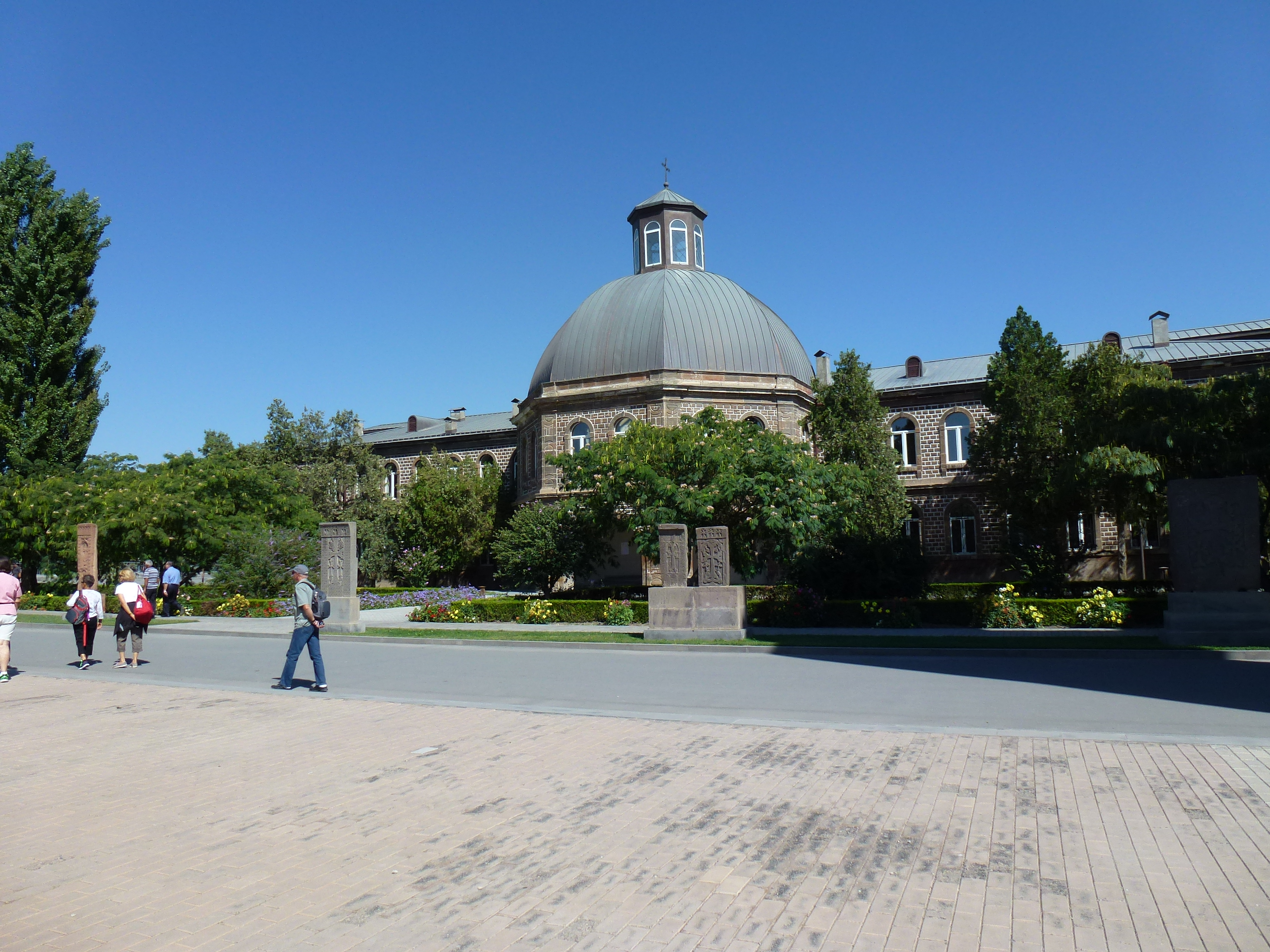
Gevorkian Theological Seminary

The Mother See of Holy Etchmiadzin in Vagharshapat is home to the Gevorkian Theological Seminary (theological university) of the Armenian Apostolic Church. The town is also home to the Karekin I Centre of Theology and Armenology. The Mother See also runs the Eurnekian Public School which is one of the prominent schools of Armenia.

The province has the private "Grigor Lusavorich University" in the town of Vagharshapat. As of the 2015-16 educational year, Armavir has 119 schools, as well as 2 schools for special needs. As of the end of 2015, the number of the students in the schools of the province is 31,100.

== Sport ==
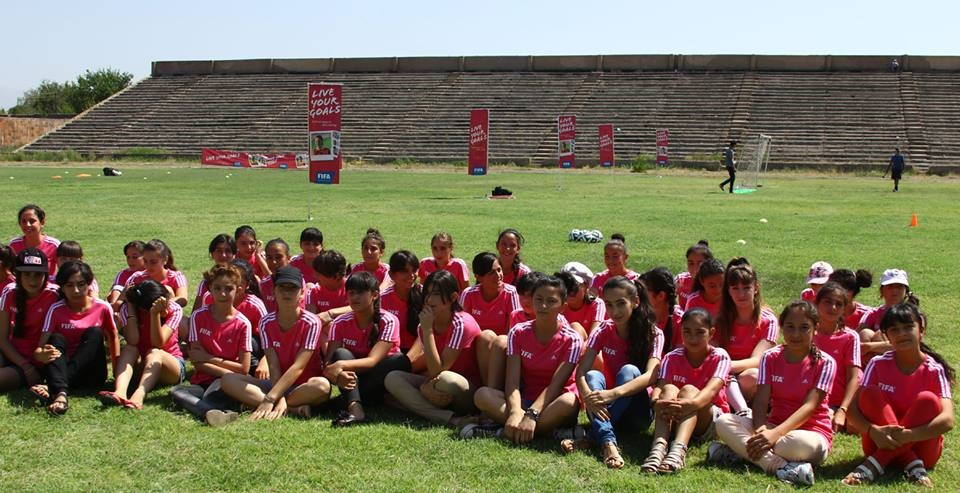
The Jubilee Stadium in July 2014, during the FIFA "Live Your Goals" program

Football is the most popular sport in the province. FC Armavir represented the town of Armavir in the domestic football competitions between 1965 and 2003 before being dissolved due to financial difficulties. Likewise, FC Vagharshapat represented Etchmiadizn between 1967 and 2005 before being dissolved.

The Jubilee Stadium of Armavir is the 3rd-largest football venue in Armenia. Vagharshapat is also home to a football stadium with a minor capacity. 2 football academies are currently under construction in the towns of Vagharshapat and Armavir. The construction of the Vagharshapat Football Academy is due to be completed in October 2017, while the Armavir Football Academy will be ready in October 2009.

Martial arts including judo, muay thai, sambo and taekwondo are also popular in the province. A new sport school is currently under construction in Vagharshapat and is due to be completed in 2019. The village of Aknalich (10 km south of Vagharshapat) is famous for the Ara and Aytsemnik equestrian centre.

== Gallery ==
Armavir

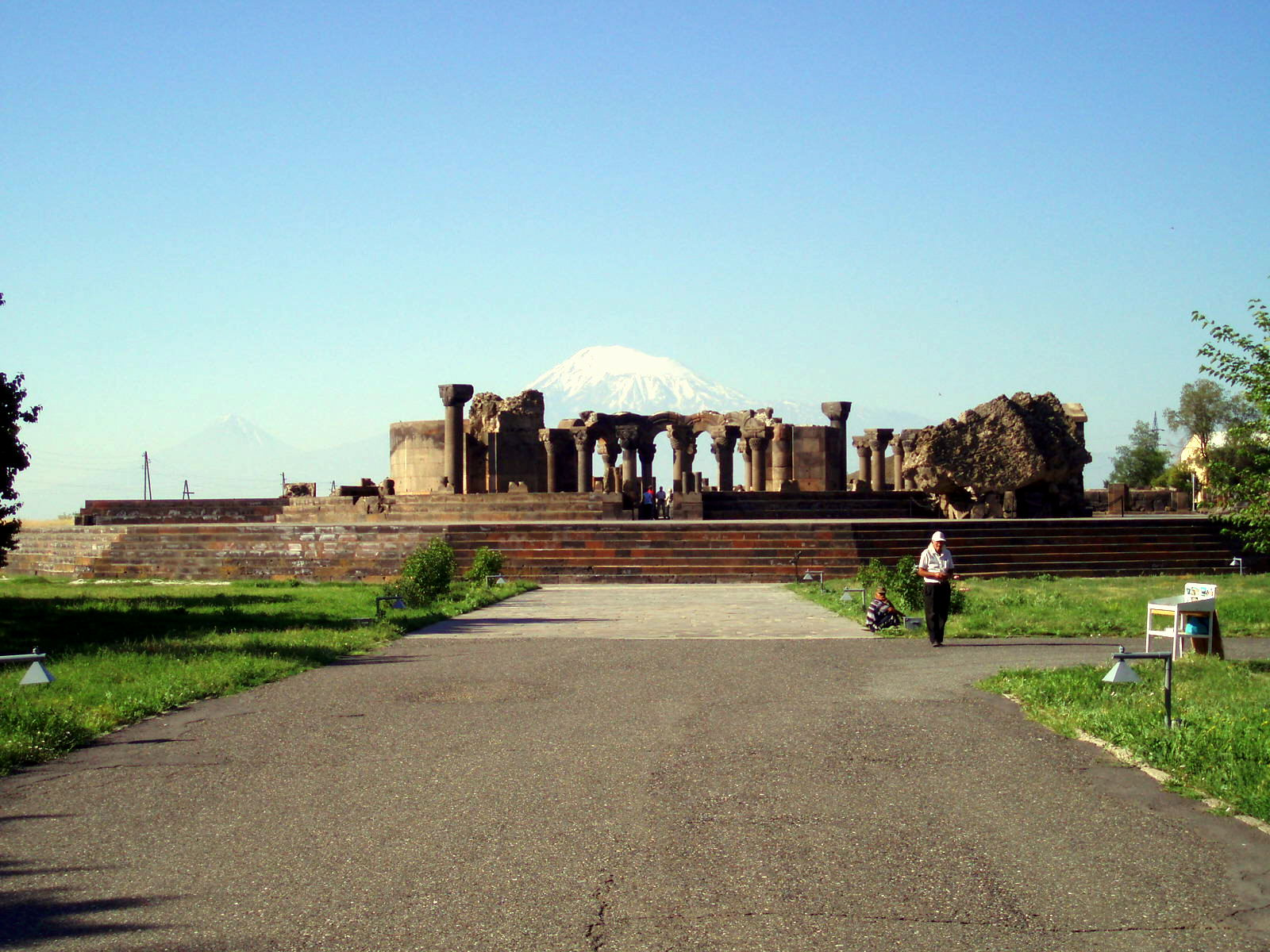
Zvartnots Cathedral of the 7th century, a UNESCO World heritage site

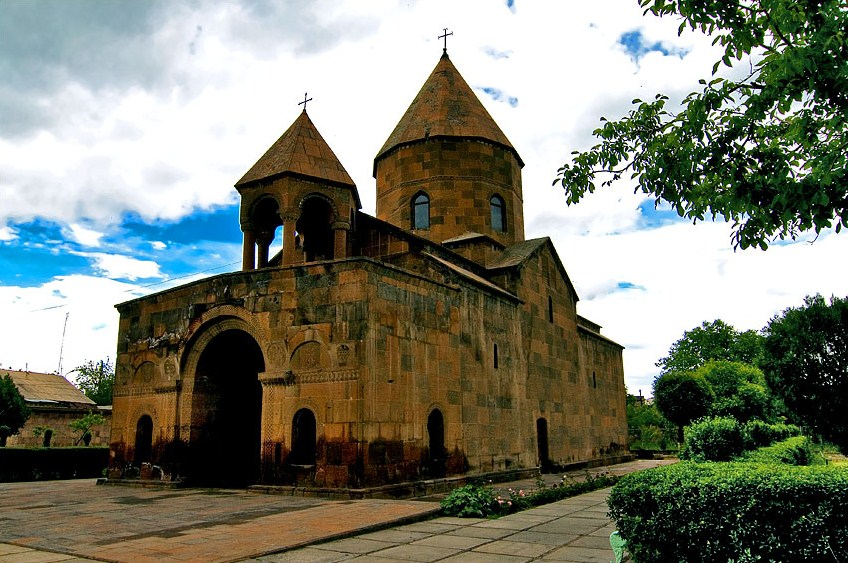
Shoghakat Church of 1694

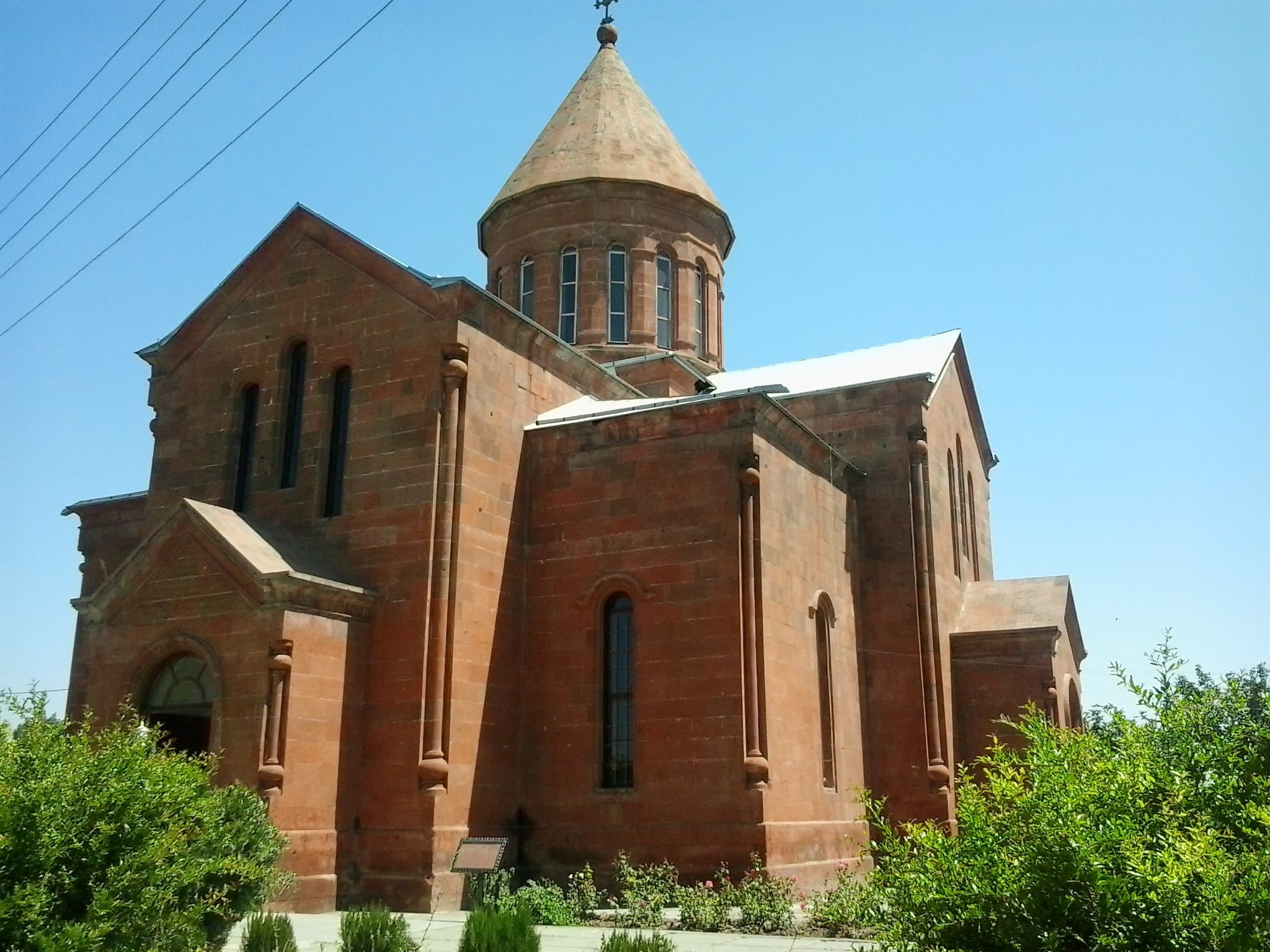
The church of Bambakashat, 1901

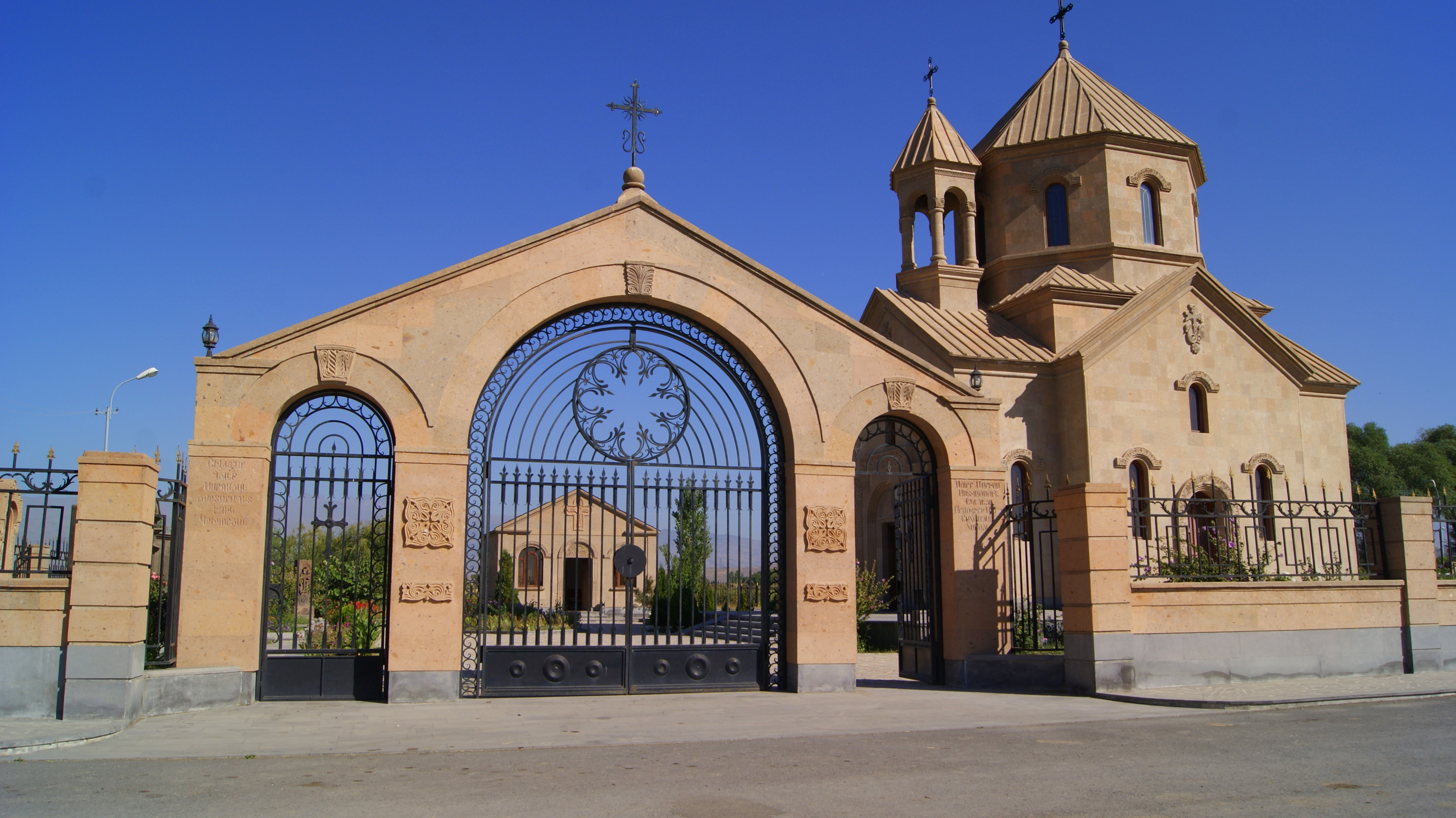
The church of Shahumyan village

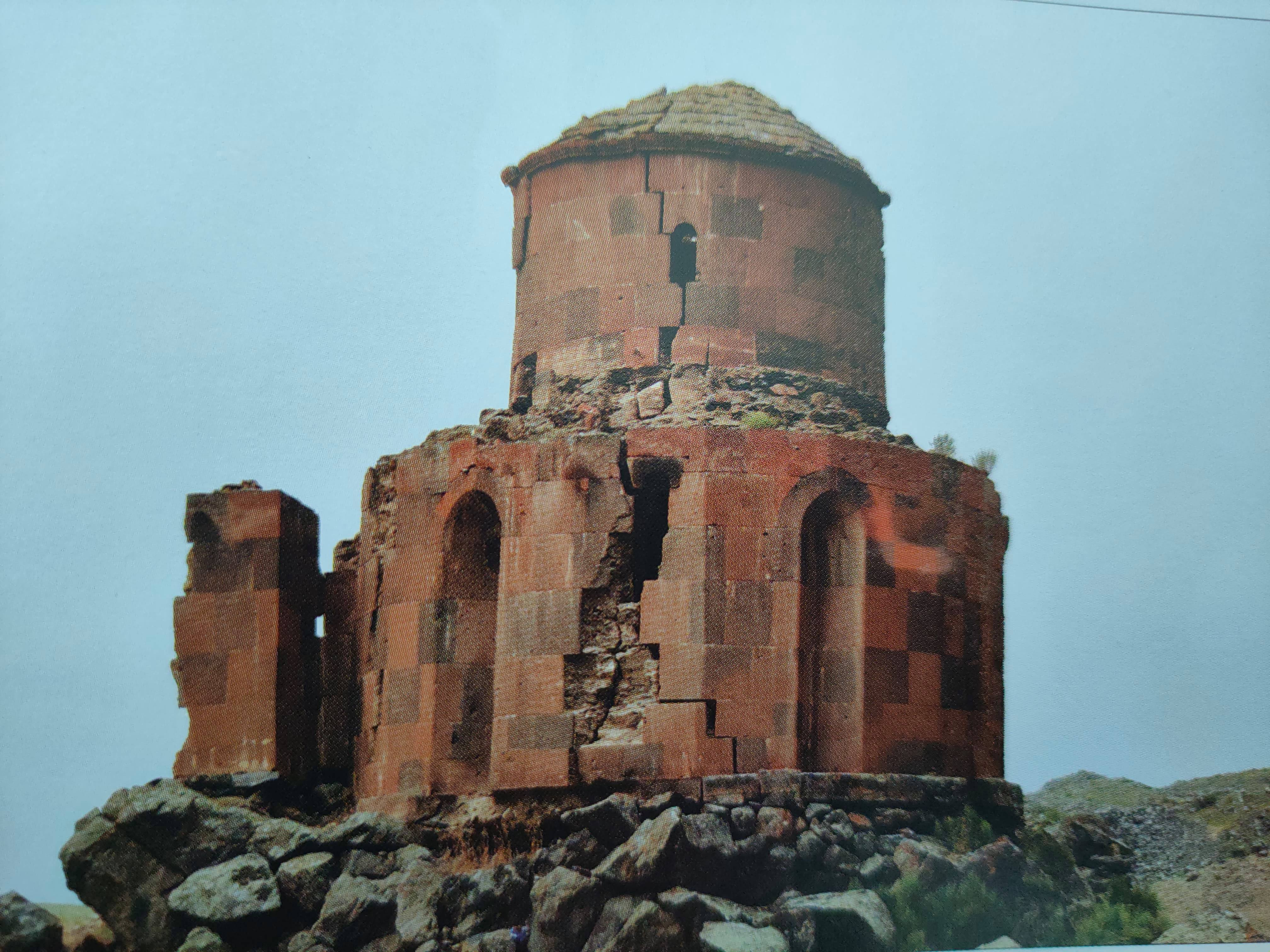
Sushanavank church

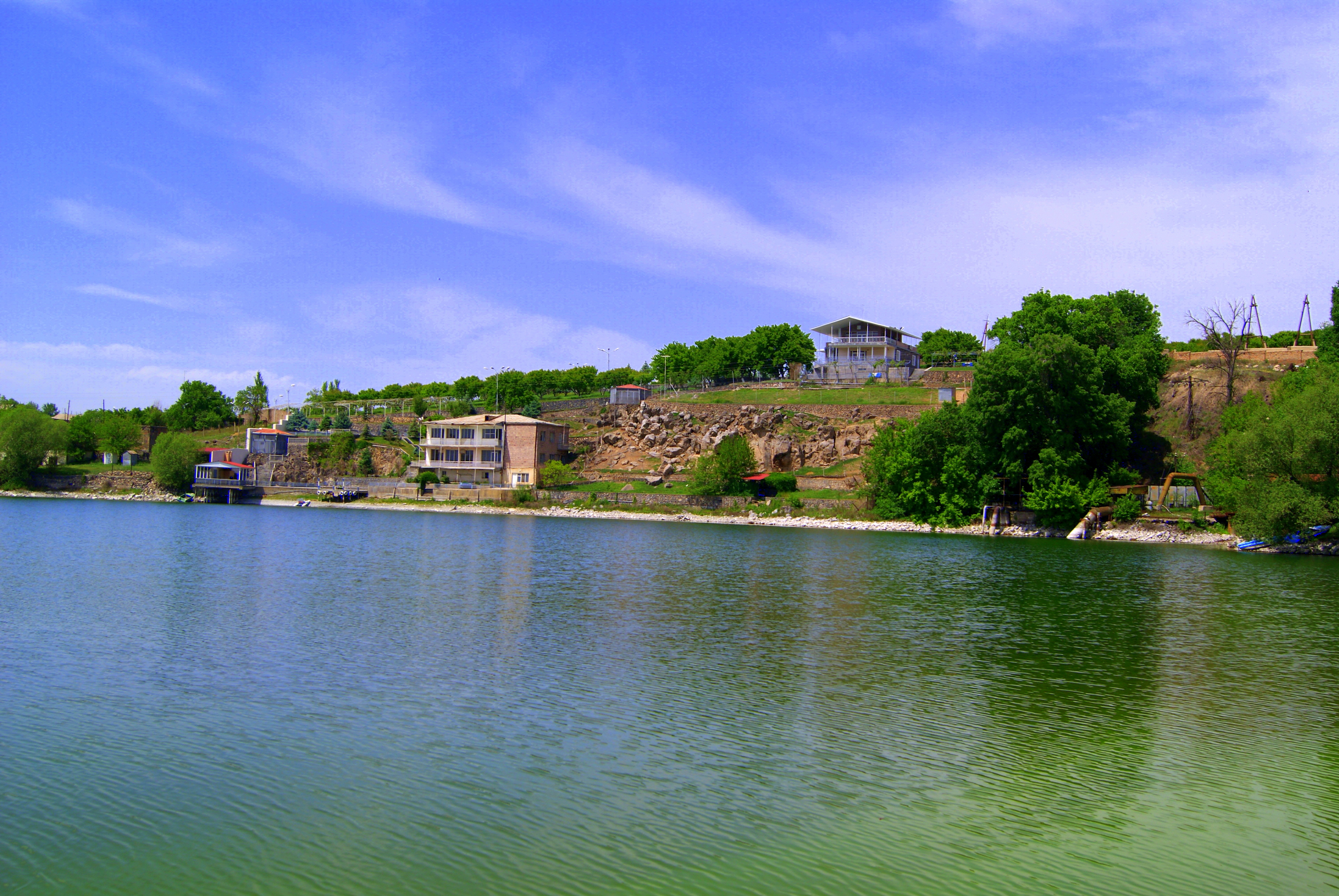
Lake of Aknalich

== See also ==
- Armavir
- Karakishlag
- Sardarapat Memorial
- Shavarut
- Vagharshapat
- Verin-Kulibeklu
- Zvartnots International Airport
