= Diocese of Armavir =

Diocese of Armavir Արմավիրի թեմ
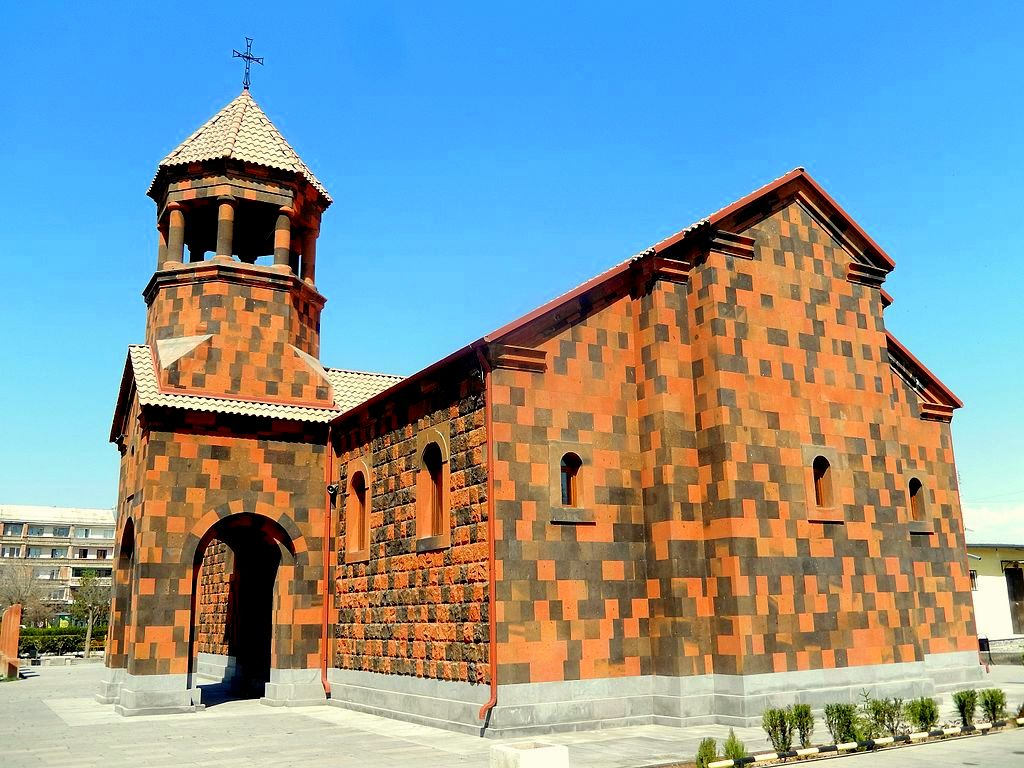
- Saint Gregory of Narek Cathedral

Location
- Country: Armenia

Statistics
- Population: Total: (as of 2011); ~250,000
- Churches: 26

Information
- Denomination: Armenian Apostolic Church
- Rite: Armenian Rite
- Established: 1996
- Cathedral: Saint Gregory of Narek Cathedral, Armavir

Current leadership
- Patriarch: Karekin II
- Primate: Bishop Sion Adamyan

Website
- Official website

Diocese of Armavir (Armenian: Արմավիրի թեմ Armaviri t'em), is a diocese of the Armenian Apostolic Church covering the Armavir Province of Armenia. The name is derived from the historic city of Armavir which served as the capital of the ancient Kingdom of Armenia between 331 and 210 BC.

The diocese was officially founded on May 30, 1996, by Catholicos Karekin I. The seat of the diocese is the Cathedral of Saint Gregory of Narek in the town of Armavir. Bishop Sion Adamyan is currently the primate of the diocese, serving since 2001.

== History ==
Being home to many of the most important churches and monasteries of the Armenian Apostolic Church, the territory of Armavir has been the spiritual centre of the Armenian nation. Throughout the history, the territory has been regulated by several dioceses of the Armenian Church, including the diocese of Amberd, Hovhannavank and Bjni.

The territory remained an active religious centre of the Armenian church with the inauguration of many churches and monastic complexes during the medieval period. During the 7th century, the churches of Saint Hripsime, Saint Gayane, Zvartnots and Targmanchats were built.

After the independence of Armenia, the Diocese of Armavir was officially founded upon a kontakion issued by Catholicos Karekin I on May 30, 1996. The church of Holy Mother of God in Vagharshapat has served as the seat of the diocese until 2014, when it was moved to the newly built Saint Gregory of Narek Church in the town of Armavir.

Currently, the diocese has 26 churches under its jurisdiction, while the Etchmiadzin Cathedral and the churches of Hripsime, Gayane, Shoghakat, and the Holy Archangels are under the direct regulation of the Mother See.

== Primates ==
- Bishop Asoghik Aristakesyna 1996-1998
- Priest Khoren Manukyan 1998-1999 (as vicar)
- Priestmonk Arshen Sanosyan 1999 (as vicar)
- Bishop Grigoris Buniatyan 1999-2001 (acting primate)
- Priest Artak Simonyan 2001 (acting primate)
- Bishop Sion Adamyan 2001-present

== Active churches ==
- Surp Harutyun Church, Geghakert, 13th century
- Holy Mother of God Church, Vagharshapat, 1767
- Surp Harutyun Church, Parakar, 1859
- Saint Stephen Church, Doghs, 19th century
- Holy Mother of God Church, Aygeshat (Vagharshapat), 19th century
- Surp Hovahnnes Church, Argavand, 19th century, rebuilt in 2009
- Saint George's Church, Aygeshat (Armavir), 1854
- Holy Mother of God Church, Parakar, 1855
- Holy Mother of God Church, Artimed, 1876
- Holy Mother of God Church, Sardarapat, 1882
- Surp Nshan Church, Gai, 1894
- Holy Mother of God Church, Mrgashat, 1903
- Holy Mother of God Church, Arshaluys, 1909
- Surp Hovahnnes Church, Mrgastan, 1912
- Surp Sahak Church, Tandzut, 1912
- Holy Mother of God Church, Bambakashat, 1914
- Holy Saviour's Church, Musaler, 2000
- Saint Lazarus Church, Metsamor, 2005
- Surp Vartan Church, Baghramyan, 2009
- Holy Mother of God Church, Shahumyan, 2010
- Church of Saint Basil of Caesarea, Nor Kesaria, 2011
- Surp Anna Church, Aghavnatun, 2012
- Surp Karapet Church, Janfida, 2014
- Saint Gregory of Narek Cathedral, Armavir, 2014
- Holy Mother of God Church, Aratashen, 2015
- Surp Vartan Church, Dalarik, 2015
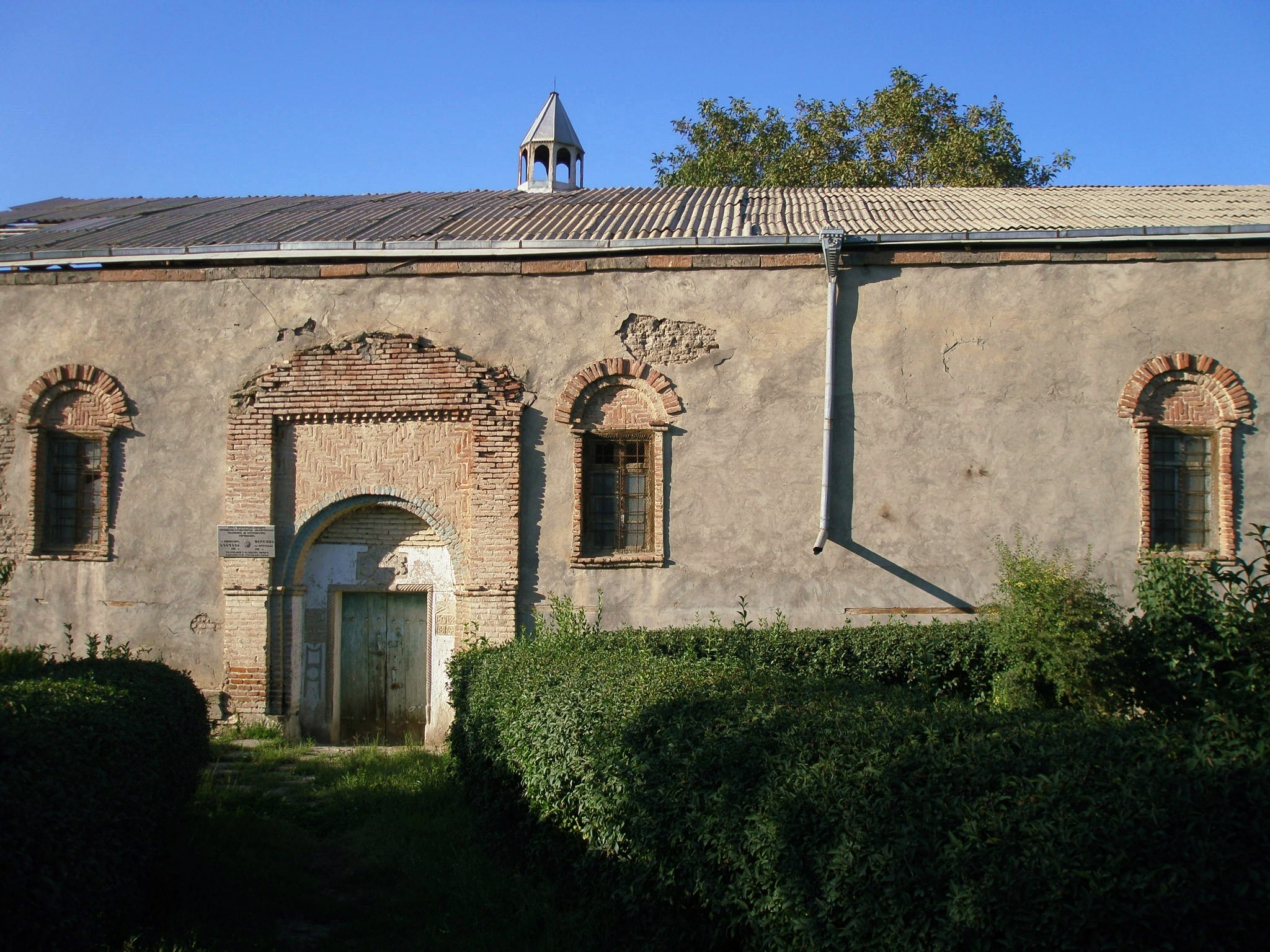
Surp Harutyun Church, Geghakert

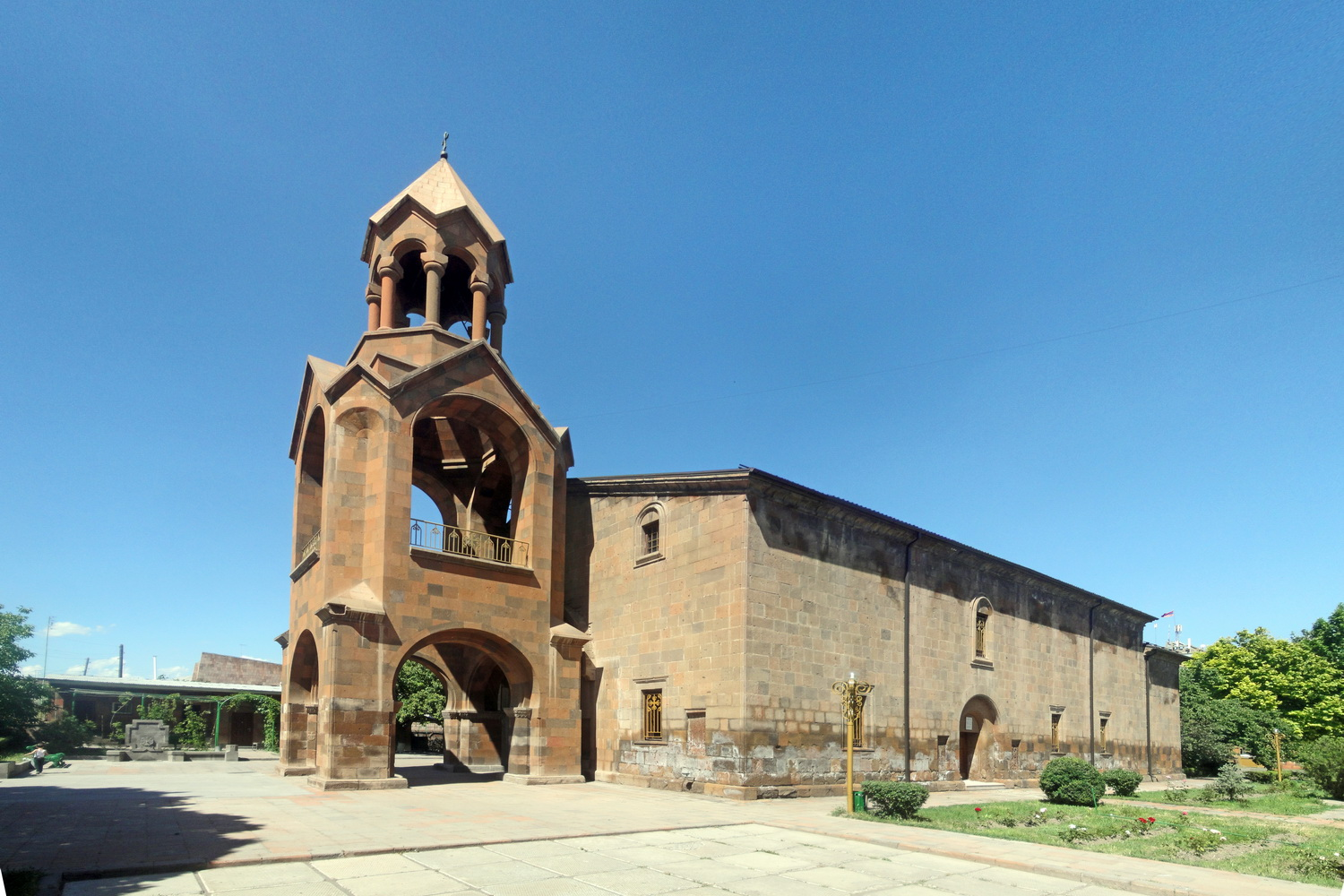
Holy Mother of God Church, Vagharshapat

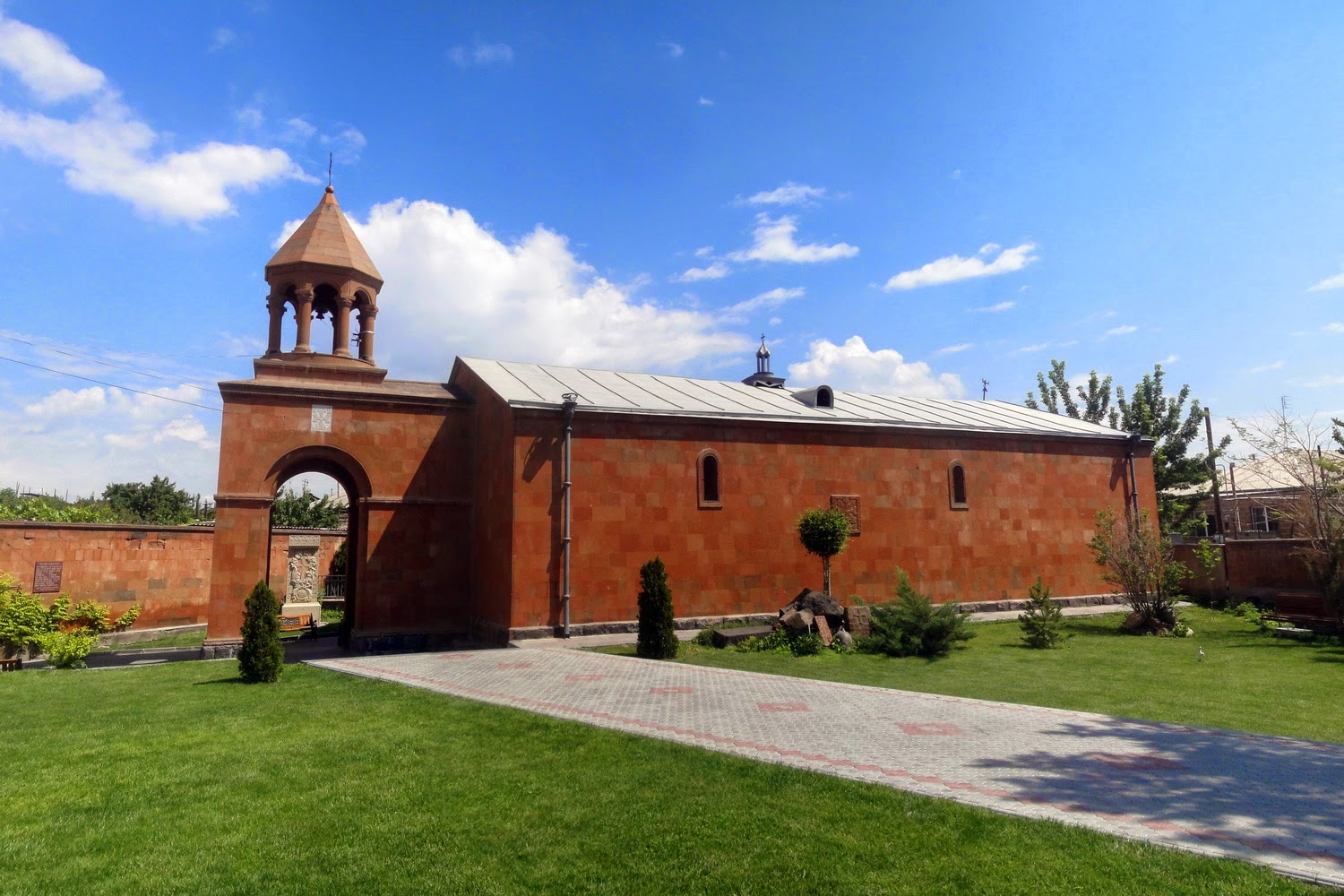
*Surp Harutyun Church, Parakar

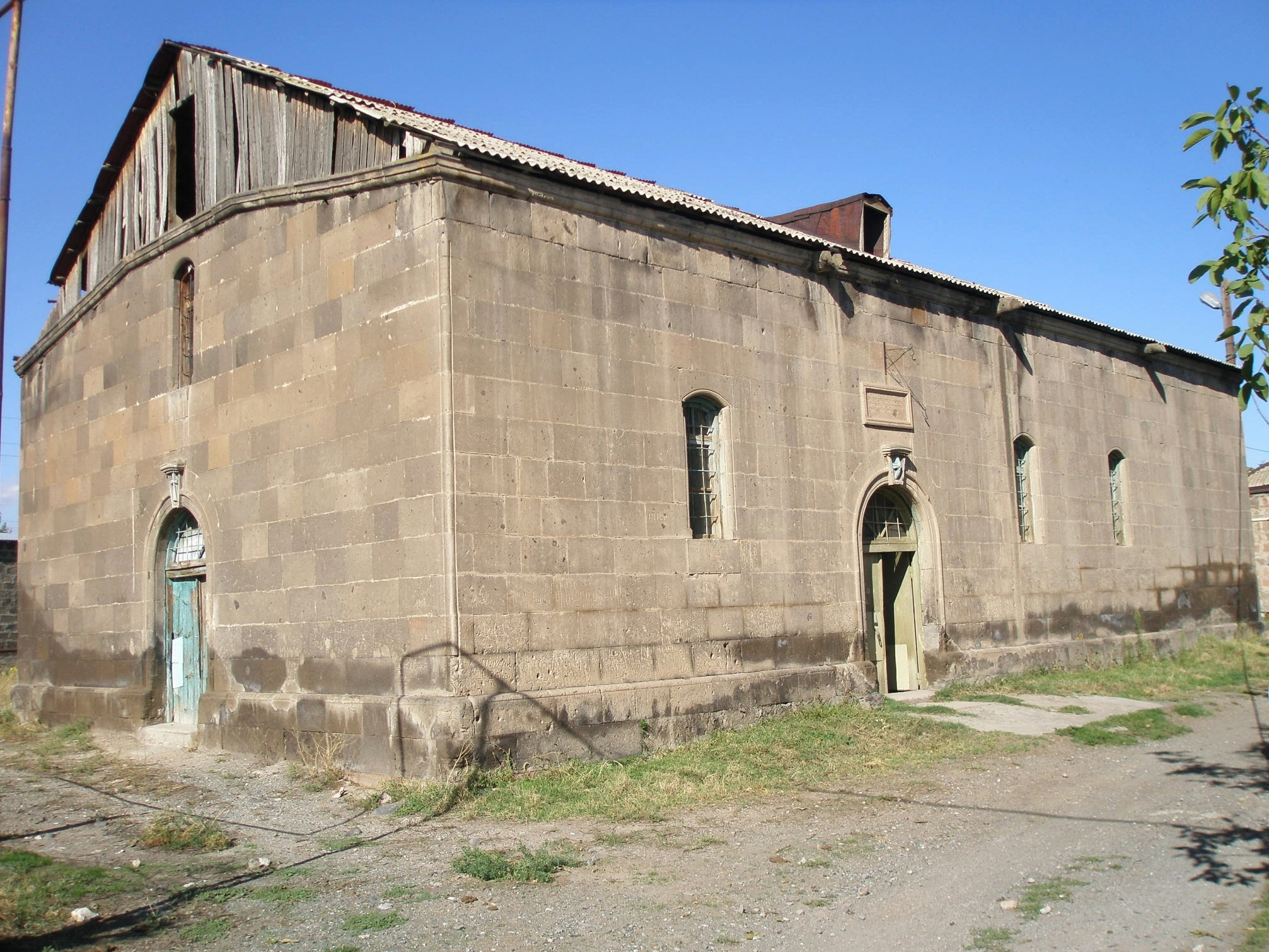
Holy Mother of God Church, Aygeshat (Vagharshapat)

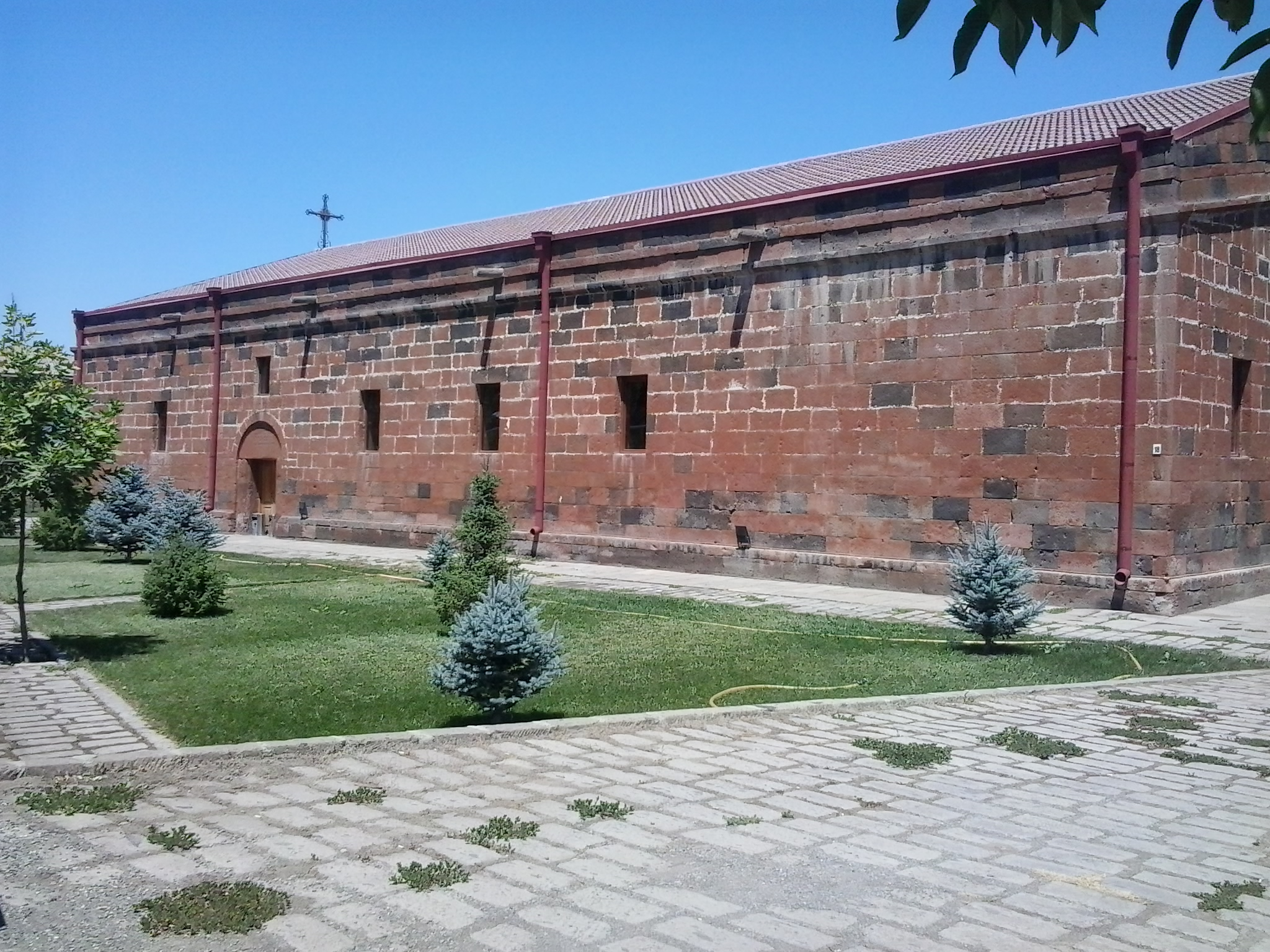
Holy Mother of God Church, Sardarapat

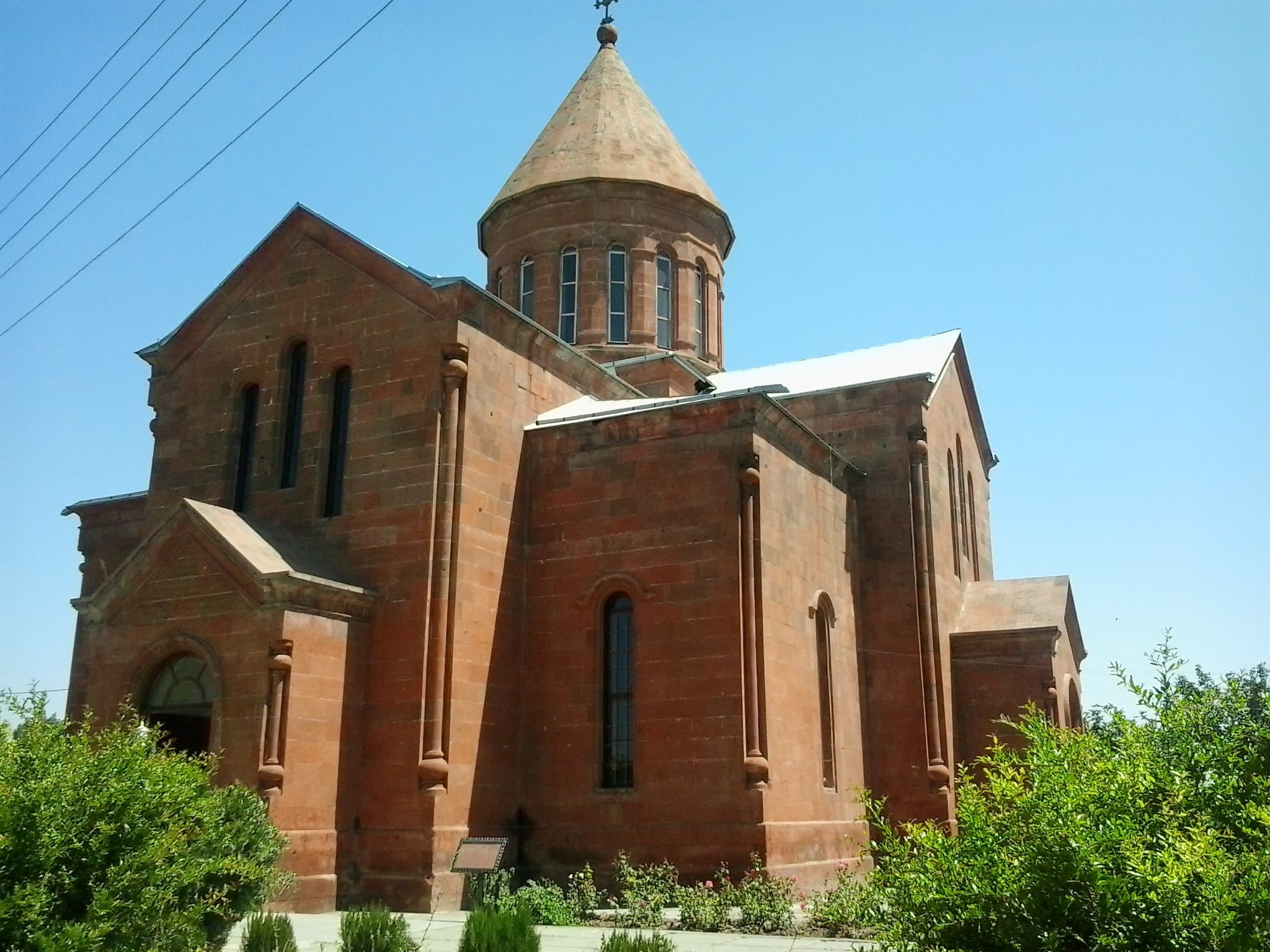
Holy Mother of God Church, Bambakashat

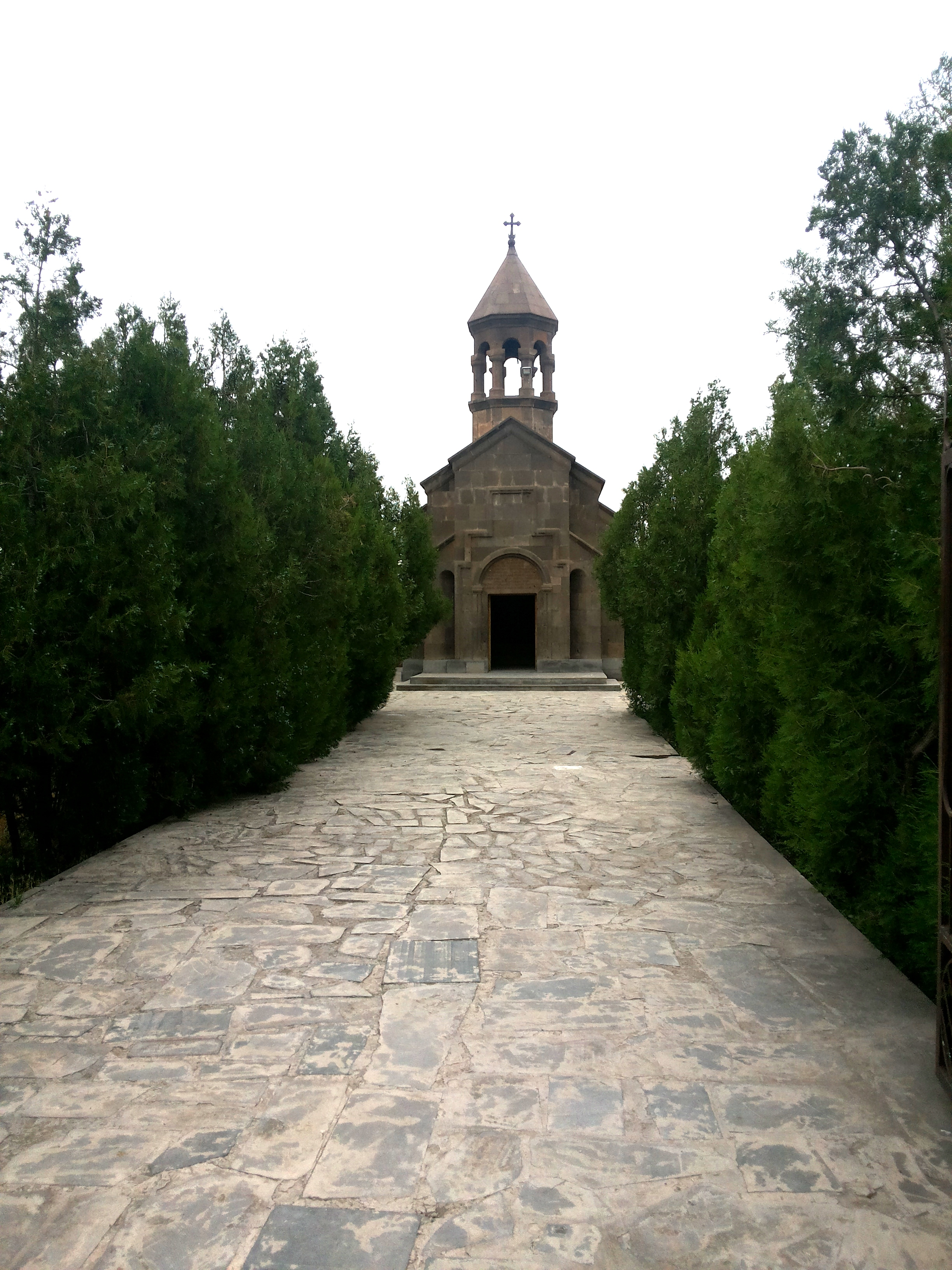
Holy Saviour's Church, Musaler

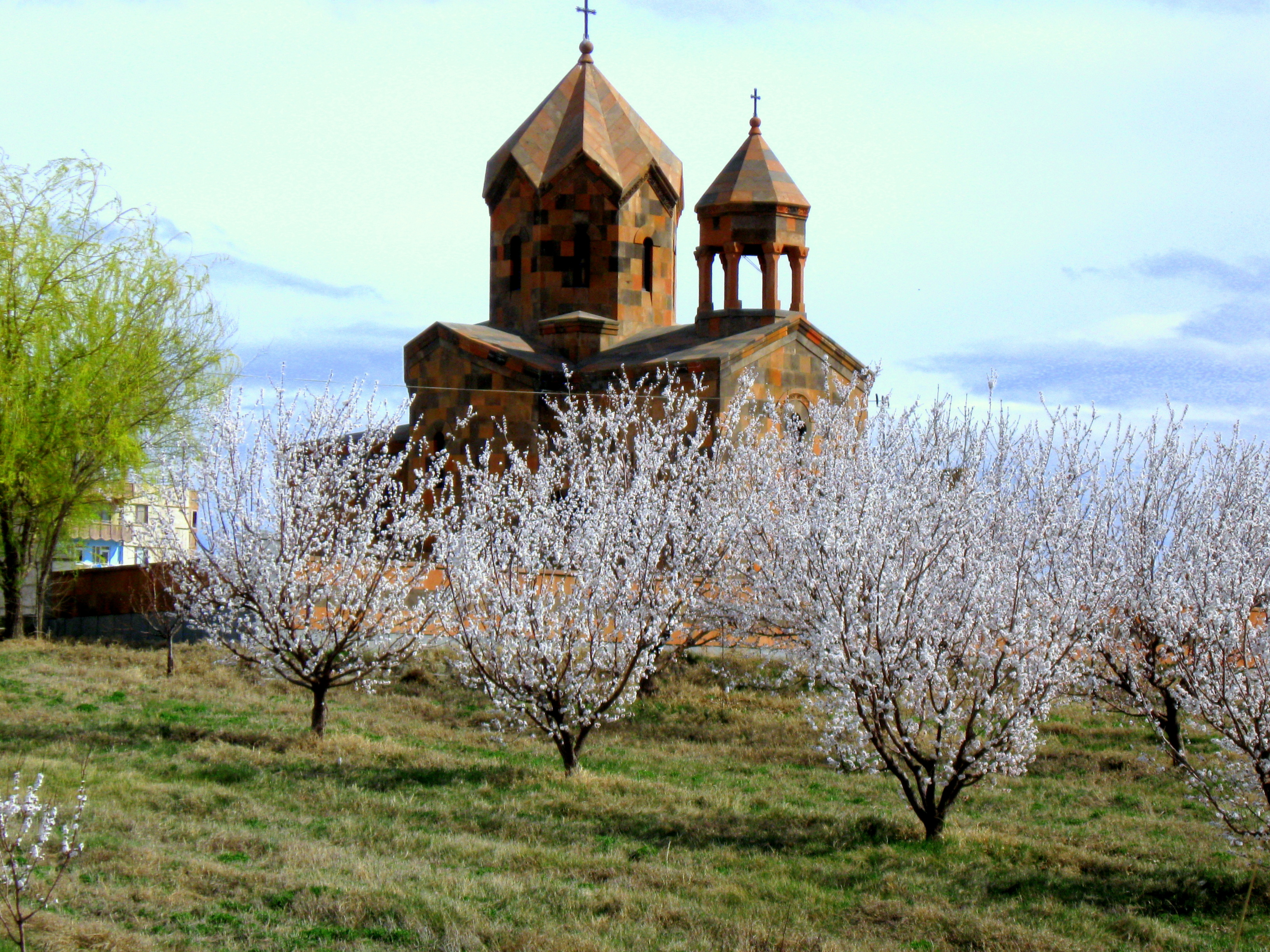
Saint Lazarus Church, Metsamor

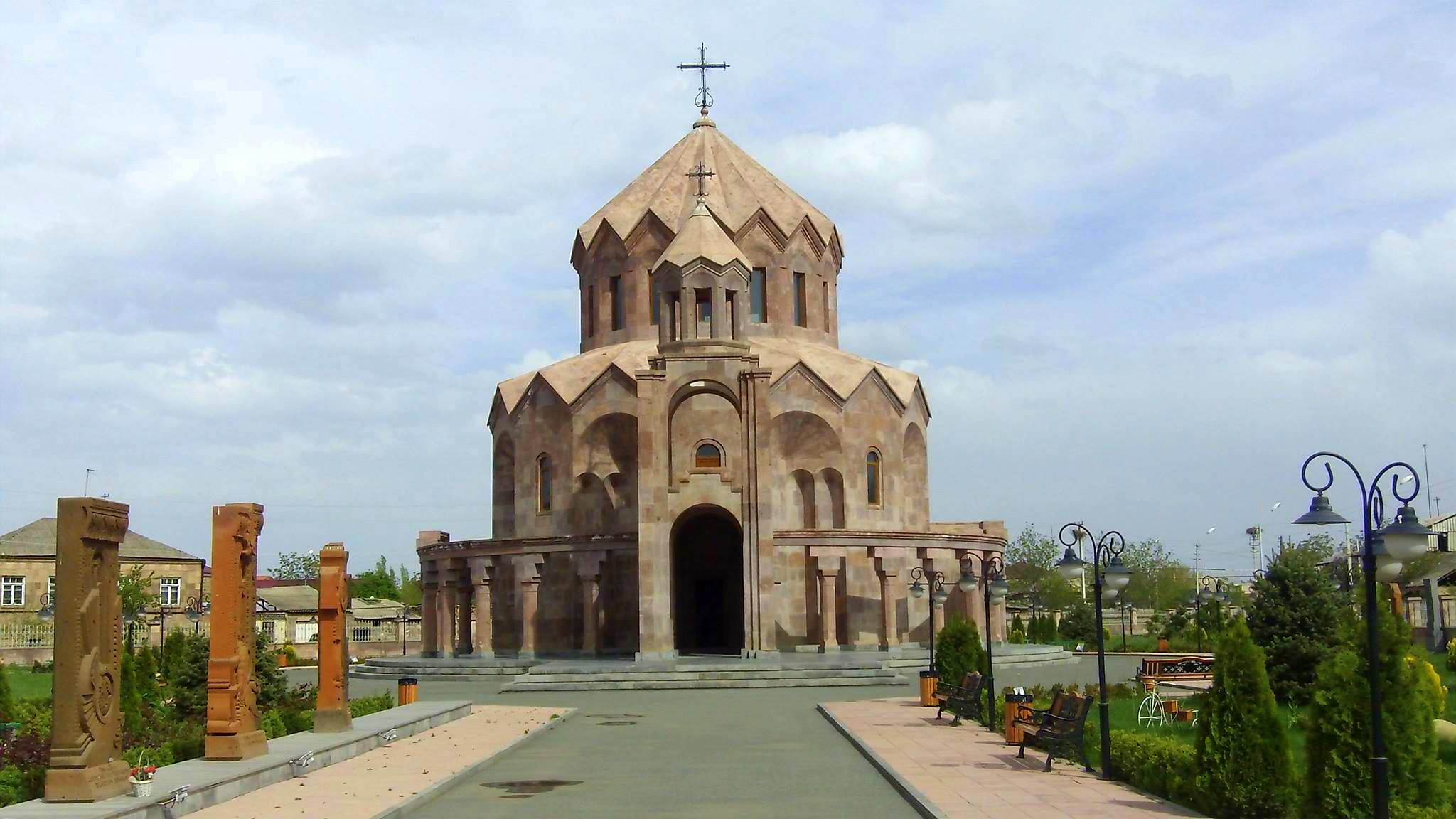
Surp Anna Church, Aghavnatun

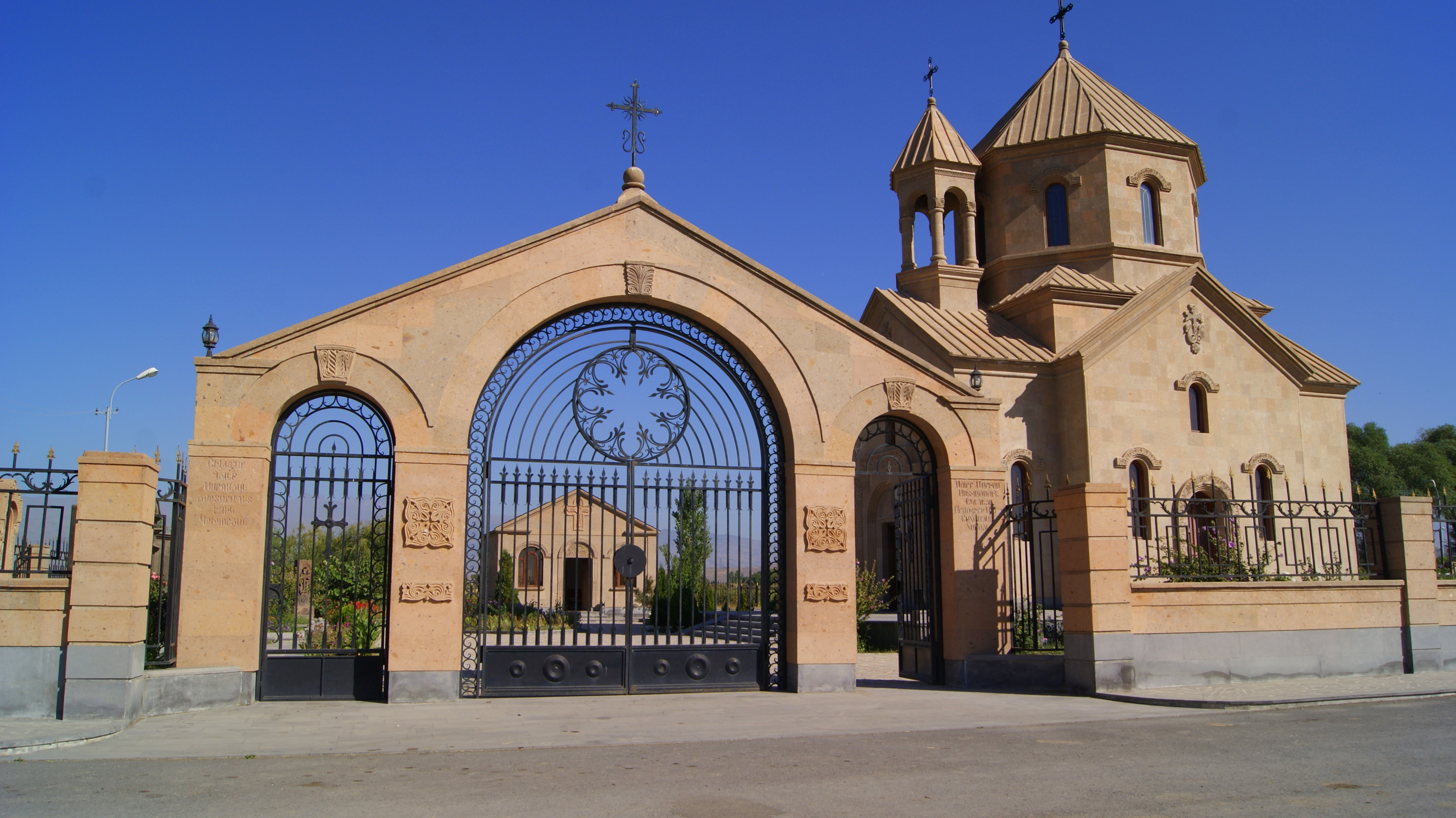
Holy Mother of God Church, Shahumyan

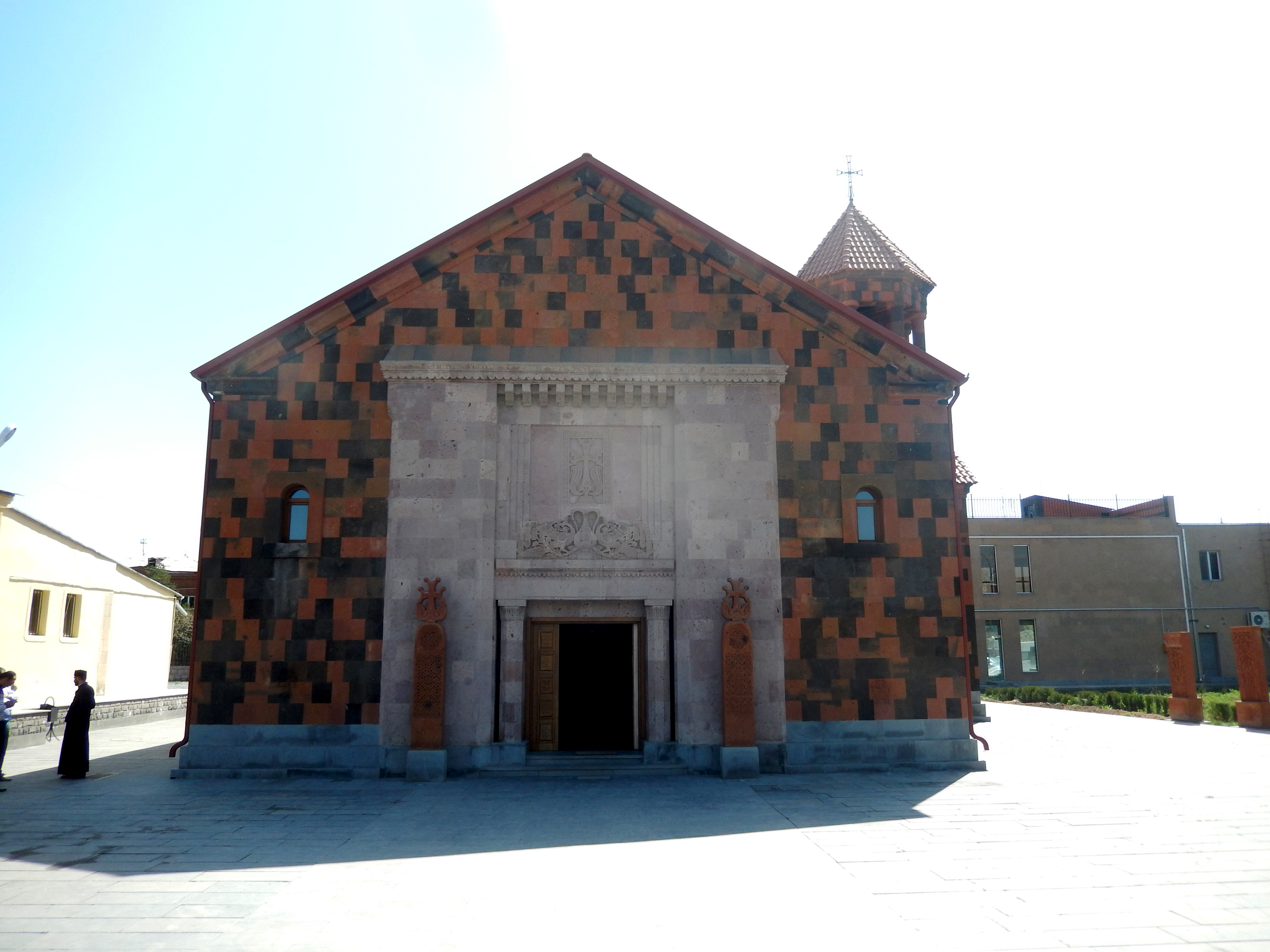
Saint Gregory of Narek Cathedral, Armavir

== Inactive/ruined churches and monasteries ==
- Zvartnots Cathedral, Vagharshapat, 652
- Targmanchats Monastery, Aygeshat (Vagharshapat), 6-7th centuries
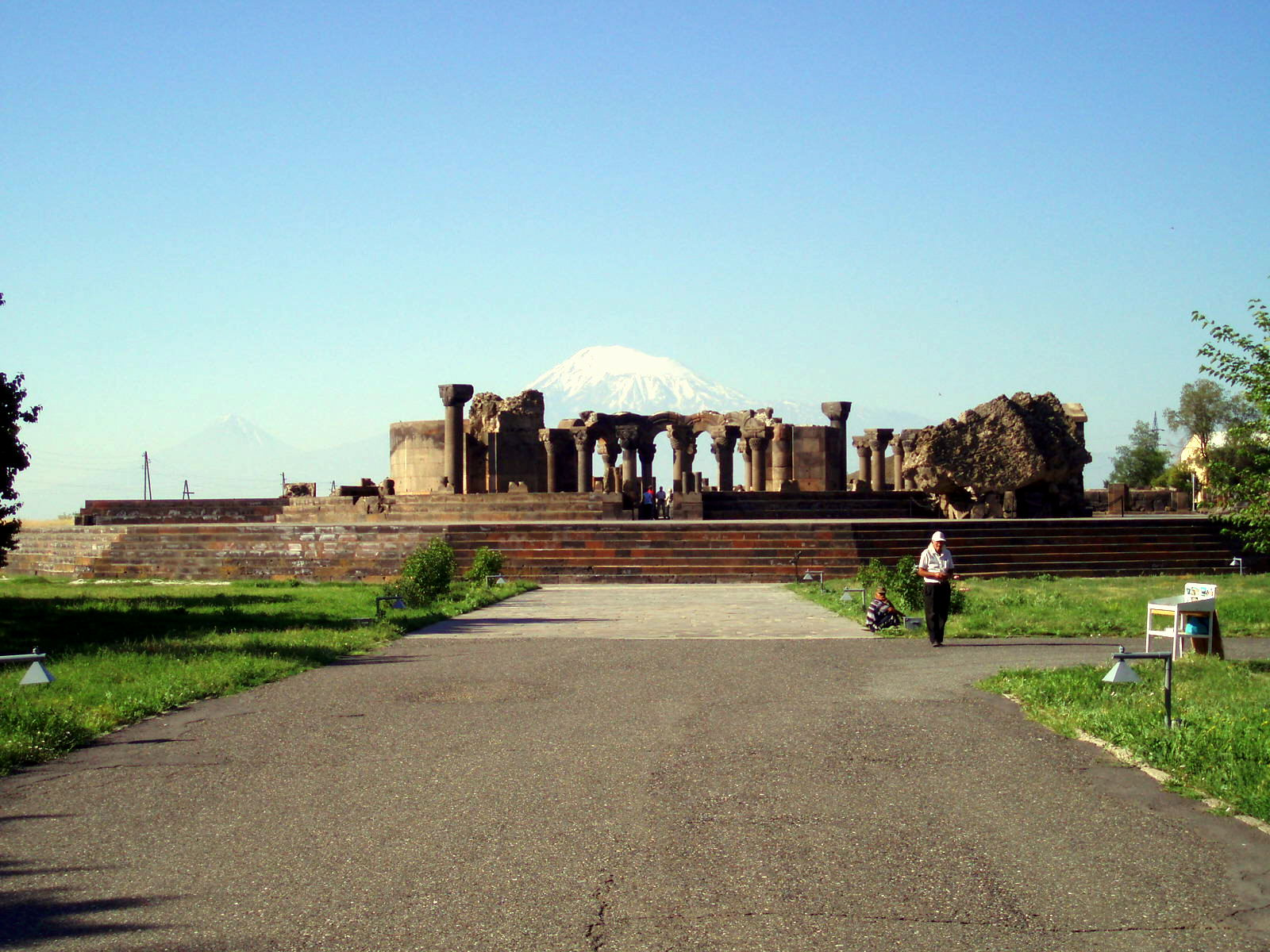
Zvartnots Cathedral, Vagharshapat, 652

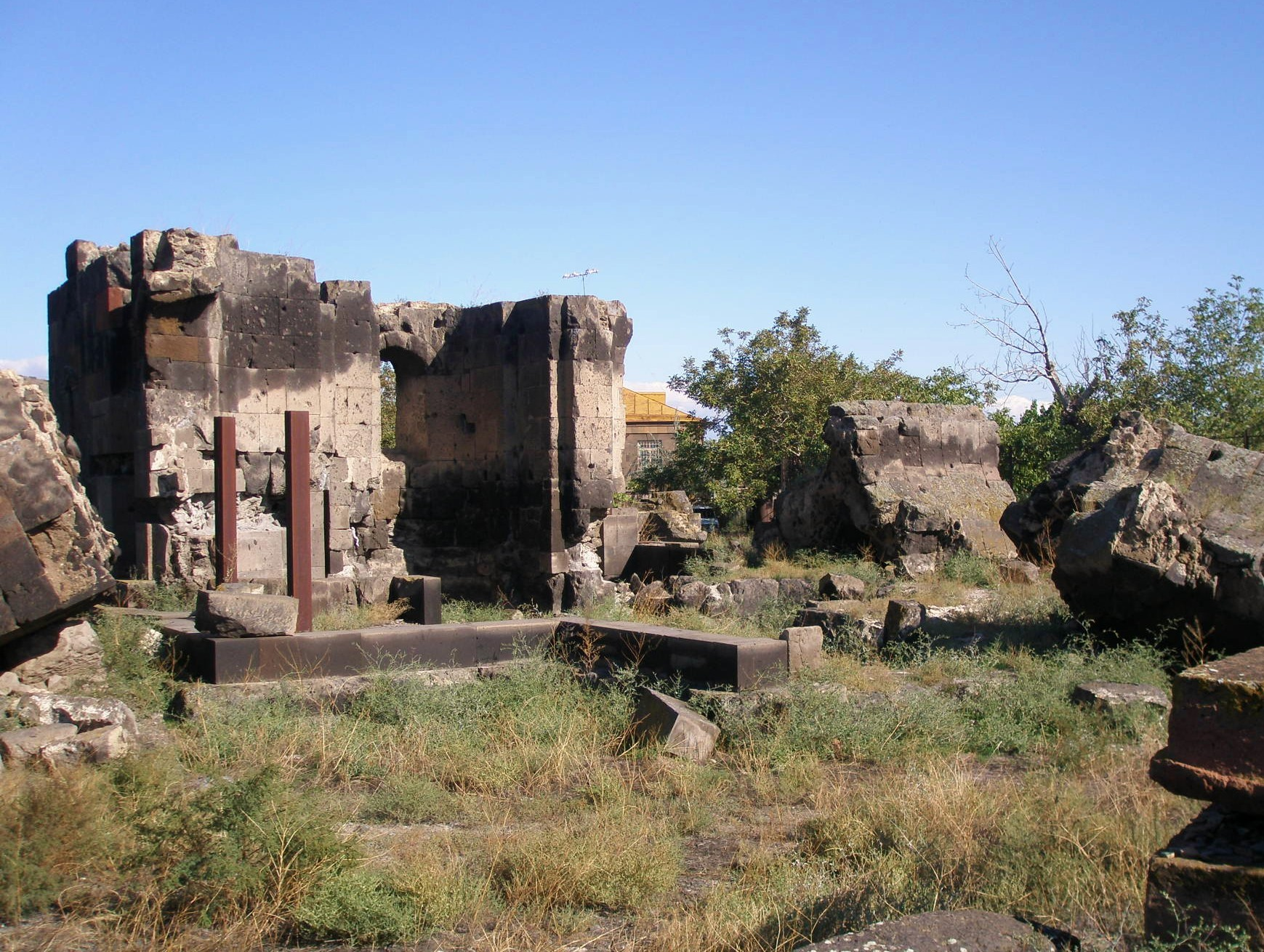
Targmanchats Monastery, Aygeshat (Vagharshapat), 6-7th centuries
