= Aygeshat =

Aygeshat or Aigeshat may refer to:

- Aygeshat, Armavir, Armenia
- Aygeshat, Echmiadzin, Armenia
