= List of ambassadors of Iran to Armenia =

Coordinates: 40.204968°N 44.517837°E

Ambassador of Iran to Armenia
- Persian: سفیر ایران در جمهوری ارمنستان
- Coat of Arms of Iran

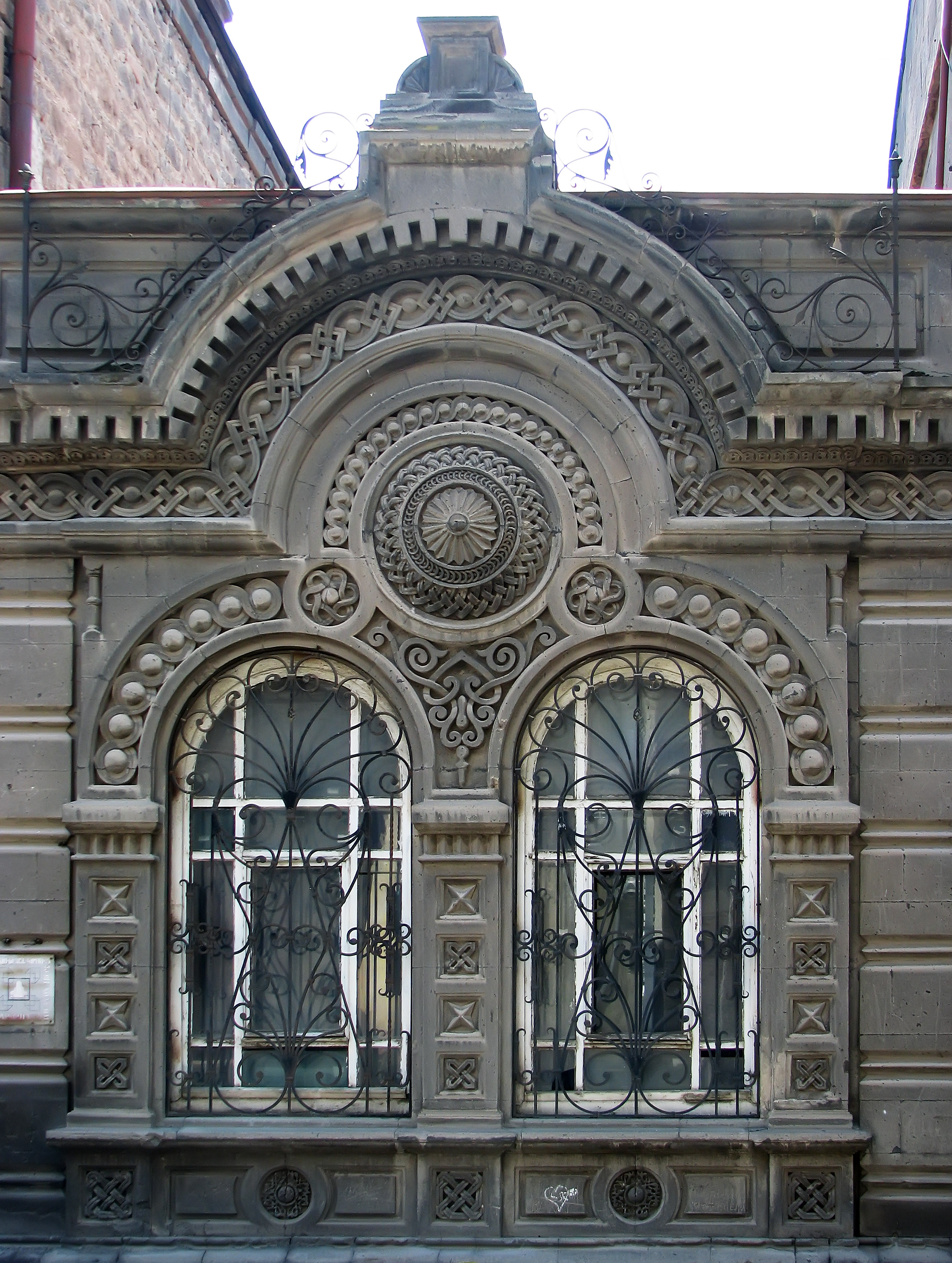
- Incumbent; Mehdi Sobhani since July 22, 2023
- Inaugural holder: Bahram Ghasemi
- Formation: April 30, 1992

The Iranian ambassador in Yerevan is the official representative of the Government in Tehran to the Government of Armenia.

== List of representatives ==
Diplomatic accreditation	Diplomatic accreditation Solar Hijri calendar	Ambassador	Persian language	Observations	List of presidents of Iran	Prime Minister of Armenia	Term end	Term end Solar Hijri calendar
April 30, 1992	1371	Bahram Ghasemi	Persian: بهرام قاسمی	Chargé d'affaires (* 1956) opened the embassy in Yerevan on April 30. 1992. He was Iranian ambassador to Ireland.	Akbar Hashemi Rafsanjani	Khosrov Harutyunyan	1993	1371
April 20, 1993	1372	Ahmad Sobhani	Persian: احمد سبحانی	Chargé d'affaires	Akbar Hashemi Rafsanjani	Hrant Bagratyan	1994	1373
1994	1373	Hamid-Reza Nikkar Isfahani	Persian: حمیدرضا نیک‌کار اصفهانی		Akbar Hashemi Rafsanjani	Hrant Bagratyan	1998	1377
September 7, 2000	1378	Mohammad Farhad Koleini (fa)	Persian: محمدفرهاد کلینی	(* 1960) is a diplomat from Iran, an Iranian military officer in Armenia.: In 1982 he entered the foreign service, he was affiliated with the Iranian Embassy in Havana, the head of the Iranian embassy in Madrid.; He was a member of the Mediation Board of Iran in the Nagorno-Karabakh crisis, Iran's temporary armed forces in Armenia, the second member of the Iranian Embassy in Armenia, a member of the Committee.: He was Foreign Ministry strategy, head of the West Asia Department, Deputy Assistant Secretary of State for Foreign Affairs, Deputy Assistant Secretary of State for Europe and US Department of State.	Mohammad Khatami	Andranik Margaryan	September 1, 2002	
2004	1382	Ali-Reza Haghighian (fa)	Persian: علیرضا حقیقیان	(* September 1, 1958 in Isfahan): He is married and has three children.; He got a Bachelor's Degree.; From 1981 to 1983 he was Attache to Political Affairs.; From 1983 to 1987 he was Third Secretary (Political Affairs):Embassy of the Islamic Republic of Iran in Canada(Ottawa):.; From 1987 to 1988 he was Second Secretary(Political Affairs):.; From 1988 to 1993 he was First Secretary, Embassy of the Islamic Republic of Iran in Federal Republic of Germany (Bonn): .; Counsellor (Political Affairs):1993 to 1998. *Director General, Bureau for Study of Reports of the Ministry of Foreign Affairs, Islamic Republic of Iran: 1998 to 2001.; From 2001 to 2003 he was Iranian Charge d'Affaires in Iraq (Baghdad).; From 2004 to 2007 he was Ambassador in Armenia.; From 2007 to 2011 he was Senior Expert, Commonwealth Affairs.; From December 2011 to 2014 he was Iranian ambassador to Pakistan.	Mohammad Khatami	Andranik Margaryan	2007	1386
May 6, 2008	1386	Ali Saghayan	Persian: علی سقائیان		Mahmoud Ahmadinejad	Tigran Sargsyan	May 3, 2012	
2013	1391	Mohammad Raisi (fa)	Persian: محمد رئیسی	(* 1336 in Shahr-e-Kord), a former representative of the sixth and third parliamentary reformists from the Shahrekord constituency in Chaharmahal and Bakhtiari province. Chaharmahal and Bakhtiari province has four representatives in the Islamic Consultative Assembly.	Hassan Rouhani	Tigran Sargsyan	October 1, 2013	
October 8, 2015	1394	Kazem Sajjadi (fa)	Persian: سیدکاظم سجادی	In 1983 he entered the foreign service. He was employed in the Iranian Embassy in Athens (Greece) Consulate of the Iranian Embassy in Kuala Lumpur, Malaysia. Head of the Consulate General of the Islamic Republic of Iran – Hamburg	Hassan Rouhani	Hovik Abrahamyan	December 1, 2019	
February 1, 2020	1398	Abbas Badakhshan Zohouri	Persian: عباس بدخشان ظهوری		Hassan Rouhani	Nikol Pashinyan	2023	1402
July 22, 2023	1402	Mehdi Sobhani	Persian: مهدی سبحانی		Ebrahim Raisi	Nikol Pashinyan		

== See also ==
- Armenia–Iran relations
