= List of cathedrals in Armenia =

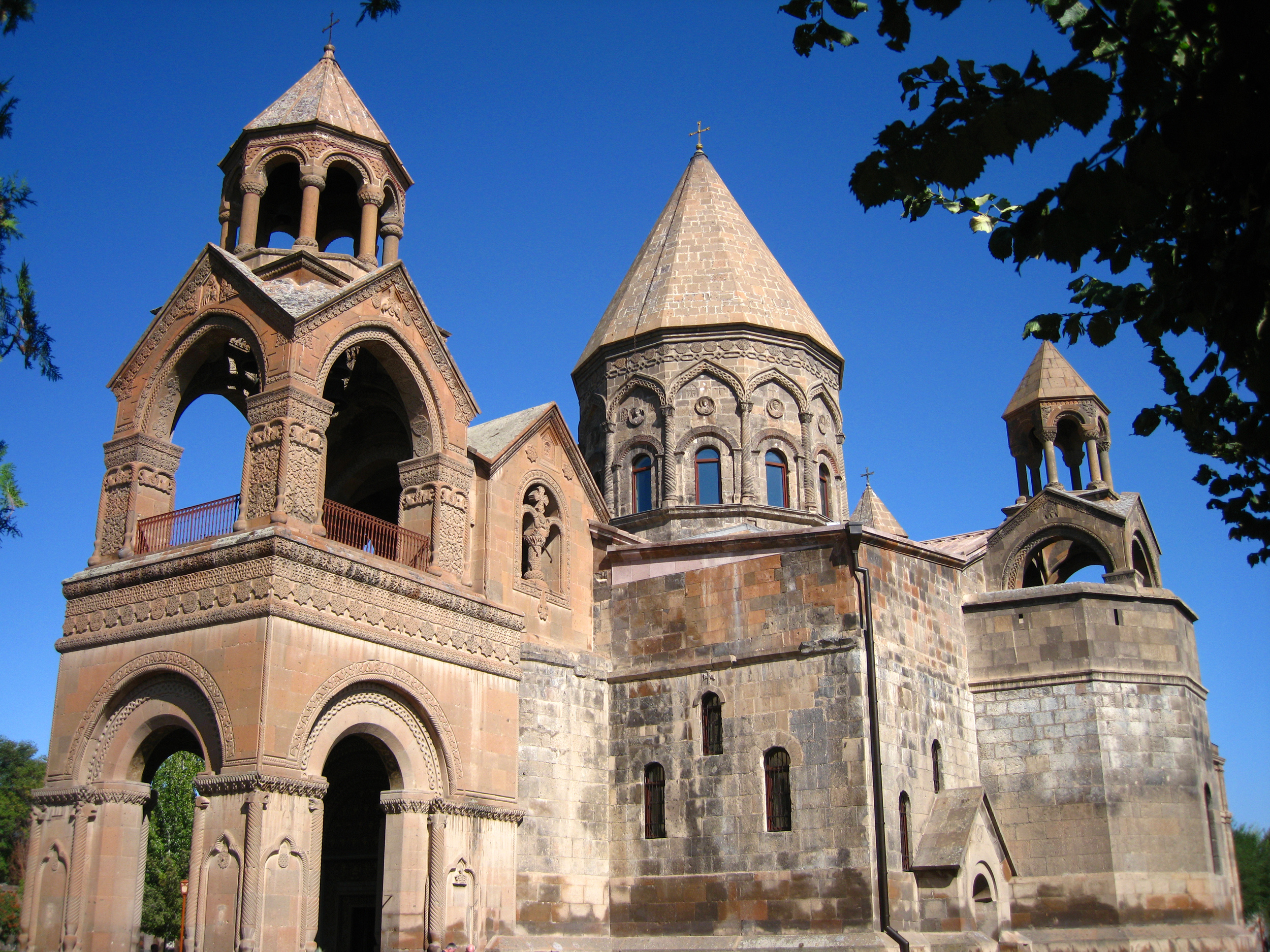
Etchmiadzin Cathedral in Vagharshapat

The Armenian Apostolic Church is the national church of Armenia.

== List of cathedrals ==
- Etchmiadzin Cathedral in Vagharshapat (seat of the Mother See of Holy Etchmiadzin).
- Saint Gregory the Illuminator Cathedral in Yerevan (main cathedral of the capital Yerevan).
- Saint Mesrop Mashtots Cathedral of Oshakan (seat of the Diocese of Aragatzotn).
- Saint Sarkis Cathedral of Yerevan (seat of the Araratian Pontifical Diocese).
- Holy Mother of God of Vagharshapat (seat of the Diocese of Armavir).
- Holy Mother of God Cathedral of Gavar (seat of the Diocese of Gegharkounik).
- Saint Gregory of Narek Cathedral of Vanadzor (seat of the Diocese of Gougark).
- Kecharis Monastery of Tsaghkadzor (seat of the Diocese of Kotayk).
- Holy Mother of God Cathedral of Gyumri (seat of the Diocese of Shirak).
- Saint Gregory Cathedral of Goris (seat of the Diocese of Syunik).
- Surp Nerses Cathedral of Ijevan (seat of the Diocese of Tavush).
- Holy Mother of God Cathedral of Yeghegnadzor (seat of the Diocese of Vayots Dzor).
- Cathedral of the Holy Martyrs in Gyumri (Eastern Catholic)

== See also ==
- Religion in Armenia
- Lists of cathedrals by country
