= Sobhani =

Sobhani may refer to:

== People ==
- Ahmad Sobhani, Iranian diplomat
- Eshagh Sobhani, Iranian footballer
- Ja'far Sobhani, Iranian grand ayatollah
- S. Rob Sobhani, American author

== Places ==
- Sobhani, Iran, a village in Khuzestan Province, Iran
