= Armenia–Iran relations =

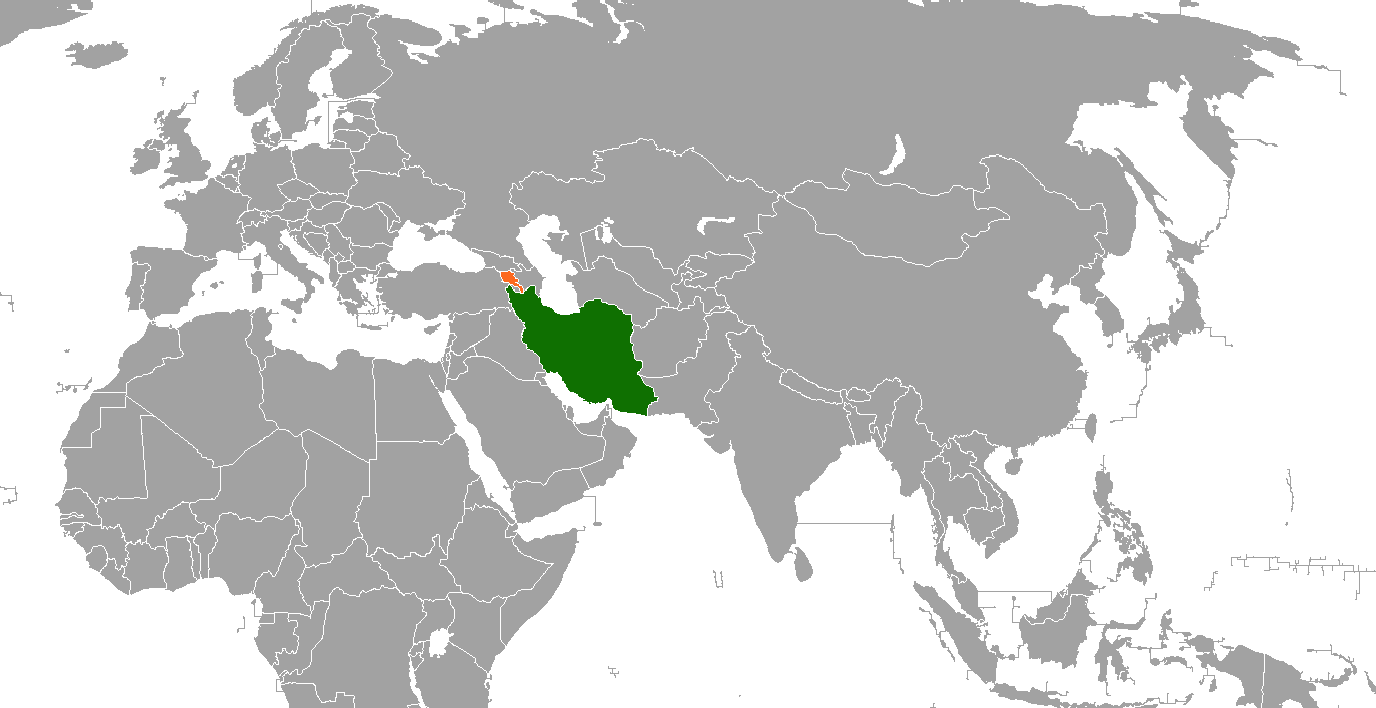

- Iran: Armenia

Diplomatic mission
- Embassy of Iran, Yerevan: Embassy of Armenia, Tehran

Bilateral relations exist between Armenia and Iran. Despite religious and ideological differences, relations between the two states remain extensively cordial and both are strategic partners in the region. Armenia and Iran are both neighbouring countries in Western Asia and share a common land border that is 44 kilometres (27 mi) in length.

The two nations share their history and culture to a large extent due to their directly interactive relationship going back for thousands of years, starting with the ancient Median kingdom. The territory of the modern-day state of Armenia was a part of Qajar Iran until 1828, when it was forcefully ceded to the neighbouring Russian Empire as a consequence of Iran's defeat in the Russo-Persian War of 1826–1828 and the resulting Treaty of Turkmenchay. In the present-day, there are no territorial disputes between the two countries and the Armenian minority in Iran, amongst the largest and oldest communities in the world, enjoys official recognition by the Iranian state. Of special importance is the bilateral cooperation in the field of energy security, which lowers Armenia's dependence on Russia and may also open up a route for Iran to supply oil and natural gas to Europe through Georgia and the Black Sea in the absence of international sanctions.

Stepan Safarian of the Armenian Center for National and International Studies has commented on the Armenia–Iran relationship, stating: "Given this geopolitical environment, Armenia has the legitimate right to cooperate with Iran for ensuring its security... Besides, Armenia has an energy surplus and its only major export market at present is Iran... So there is also a lot of economic interest involved."

Due to the two nations' intertwined history, and with the Armenians having a native presence in what is present-day northwestern Iran for millennia, many of the oldest Armenian churches and monasteries are located within Iran, such as the Saint Stepanos Monastery and Saint Thaddeus Monastery, amongst others. Armenia and Iran also share extensive touristic and trade ties.

== Historical relations ==
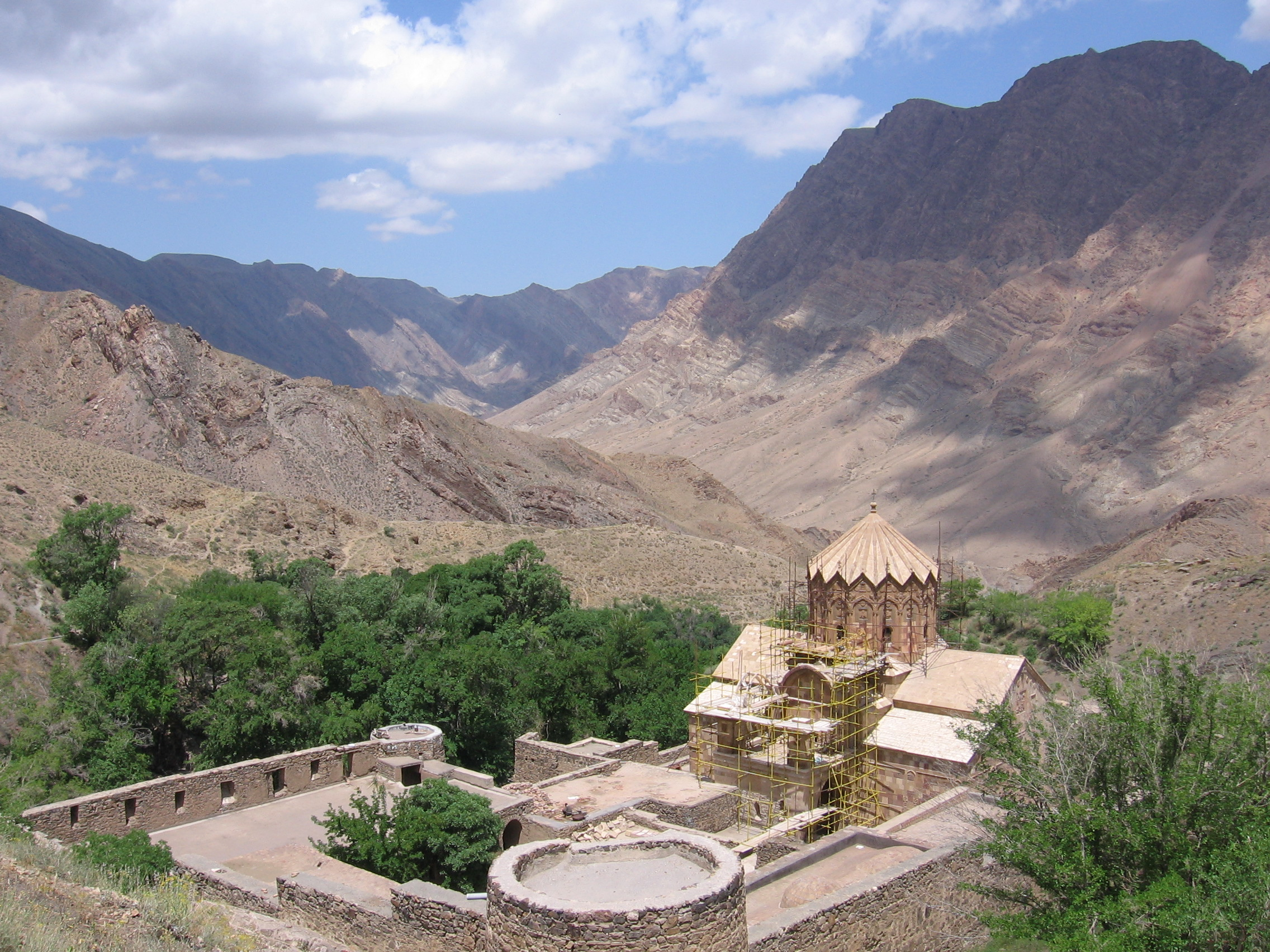
The Saint Stepanos Monastery is an Armenian monastery about 15 km northwest of Jolfa city, East Azarbaijan Province, northwest Iran, situated in a deep canyon along the Aras river. Though built in the 9th century, St Bartholomew built a church on the same site in 62 AD.

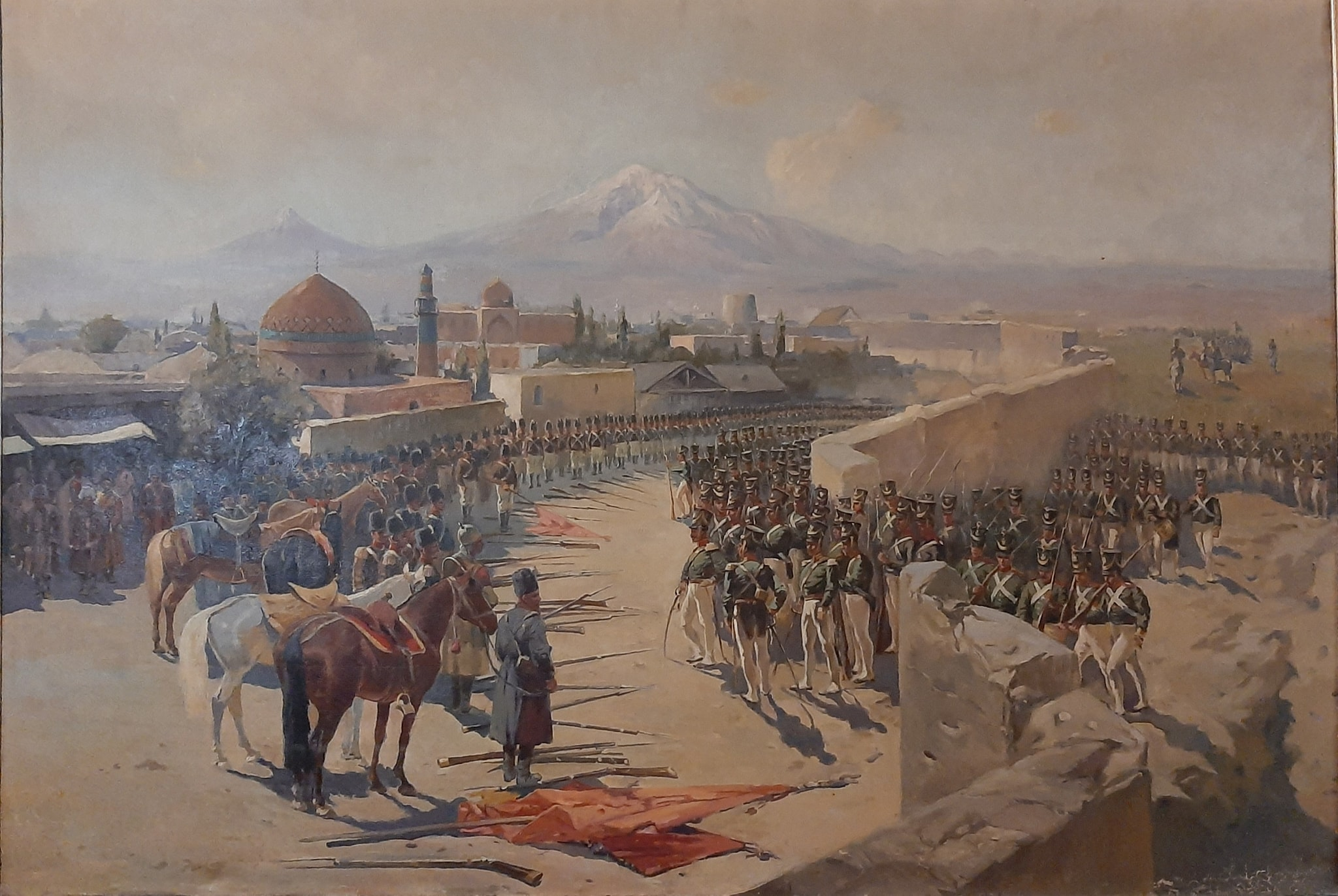
Painting of the Capture of Erivan during the Russo-Persian War (1826-1828) by the Russian troops. (By Franz Roubaud, 1893)

Iran and Armenia have been in close contact for thousands of years. Since Antiquity there has always been much interaction between Ancient Armenia and Persia (Iran). The Armenian people are amongst the native ethnic groups of northwestern Iran (known as Iranian Azerbaijan), having millennia long recorded history there while the region (or parts of it) have had made up part of historical Armenia numerous times in history. These historical Armenian regions that nowadays include Iranian Azerbaijan are Nor Shirakan, Vaspurakan, and Paytakaran. Many of the oldest Armenian chapels, monasteries and churches in the world are located within this region of Iran.

Armenia was conquered by the Persian Empire numerous times throughout history, particularly by the Median, Achaemenid, Parthian, and Sassanid empires, and the Safavid, Afsharid, and Qajar dynasties. Due to the large cultural and historical ties, Armenia is often considered part of Greater Iran. Armenia and Iran enjoy cultural and historical ties that go back thousands of years.

On the Behistun inscription of 515 BC, Darius the Great indirectly confirmed that Urartu and Armenia are synonymous when describing his conquests. Armenia became a satrap of the Persian Empire for a long period of time. Regardless, relations between Armenians and Persians were cordial.

The cultural links between the Armenians and the Persians can be traced back to Zoroastrian times. Prior to the 3rd century AD, no other neighbor had as much influence on Armenian life and culture as Parthia. They shared many religious and cultural characteristics, and intermarriage among Parthian and Armenian nobility was common. For twelve more centuries, Armenia was under the direct or indirect rule of the Persians.

What is now modern day Armenia was relatively recently separated from Iran by the Russian victory in the Russo-Persian War (1826–1828). This loss in the 1826–1828 Russo-Iranian War in the first half of the 19th century made Iran irrevocably cede its Armenian territories (amongst other territories), which made part of the concept of Iran for centuries, to Imperial Russia as confirmed in the Treaty of Turkmenchay of 1828. Following the incorporation by Russia, Armenia stayed within the Russian sphere until the dissolution of the Soviet Union.

=== Nagorno-Karabakh War (1992) ===
New peace mediation efforts were initiated by the Iranian President, Akbar Hashemi Rafsanjani in the first half of 1992, after the events in Khojaly and the resignation of Azeri President Ayaz Mutallibov. By conducting shuttle diplomacy in Armenia and Azerbaijan for several weeks, Iranian diplomats were able to bring new President of Azerbaijan Yaqub Mammadov and President of Armenia Levon Ter-Petrosian to Tehran for bilateral talks on 7 May 1992. The Tehran Communiqué was signed by Mammadov, Ter-Petrosian, and Rafsanjani following the agreement of the parties to international legal norms, stability of borders and to deal with the refugee crisis. However, the peace efforts were disrupted on the next day when Armenian troops captured the town of Shusha and failed following the capture of the town Lachin on 18 May.

While Iran had tried to keep the peace between two countries, Azerbaijani leadership had accused Iran for its tacit backup to Armenia, resulting in tensions between Azerbaijan and Iran, and boosting the ties between Armenia and Iran. Because of Azerbaijan's anti-Iran and pan-Turkist views, as well as its irredentist claims to Iranian Azerbaijan, Iran has more or less supported Armenia in its conflict with Azerbaijan, albeit discreetly.

=== Post 1992 ===
In 1994, Armenia shot down an Iranian military plane. Armenia sent a delegation to Iran to apologize. The incident did not prevent the two countries from signing trade deals.

Amid the ongoing Azerbaijan-Armenia border crisis, the Iranian foreign minister has reiterated in September 2022 that the Iran-Armenia border must remain unchanged. In May 2024, Ali Khamenei, Iran's Supreme Leader, emphasized Iran's opposition to any border changes in the South Caucasus during a meeting with Nikol Pashinyan, Armenia's Prime Minister. Following the tensions between Armenia and Azerbaijan in 2024, Armenia and Iran had expanded their military cooperation, discussing a possible arms agreement valued at around $500 million.

On 9 April 2025, Iran and Armenia held a two-day first-ever joint military drill in the Nordooz region, under the Ashura Regional Headquarters on the 44 km border between the two countries, with special forces units from both sides participating. The two day drills involved special-forced units, stimulated attacks by "terrorist groups" on border checkpoints and included weapons, both light and heavy, continued by sniper operations, demolitions and support fire. The purpose of the exercise was to reinforce the security of the borders based on the shared interests of the two countries and strengthen cooperation in the region.

On August 19, 2025, senior officials from Iran and Armenia signed ten cooperation agreements in the presence of the two countries' leaders. These agreements encompassed various fields, including political, social, cultural, tourism, industrial, educational, transportation, urban development, artistic, and health sectors. Additionally, the President of Iran and the Prime Minister of Armenia signed a joint statement concerning the visit between the two countries.

On February 24, 2026, Iranian President Masoud Pezeshkian reaffirmed Tehran’s determination to finalize a comprehensive strategic partnership document with Armenia during a meeting with Armenian Defense Minister Suren Papikyan, emphasizing the importance of expanding economic and transit cooperation between the two neighbors.

== Trade ==
Especially important is the cooperation in the field of energy security, as the pipeline that brings Iranian natural gas into Armenia has been completed many years ago. Additionally, the two states have also implemented other multimillion-dollar energy projects, which include the construction of two hydro-electric plants on the Arax River that marks the Armenian-Iranian border, and a third high-voltage transmission line linking their power grids and dams.

In July 2007, a memorandum was signed on the start of feasibility studies on the ideas of building an Armenian-Iranian railway and a Russian-owned oil refinery that would process Iranian crude. In addition, the Armenian and Iranian governments have been working on a bilateral free trade agreement that could be signed by the end of 2007.

Former Iranian President Mahmoud Ahmadinejad has been quoted as saying "The Islamic Republic of Iran welcomes and supports the development of ties with Armenia in various areas, particularly in energy as well as transportation, sports, and tourism."

Trade relations continue to be strong, as trade volume between the two countries increased to US$200 million in 2009, and to US$300 million by 2014.

In 2014, the Iranian and Armenian energy ministers agreed on the construction of a new power transmission line from Armenia to Iran in line with the two country's efforts to boost energy ties.

In June 2015, both nations agreed to start building the 3rd power transmission line. It was expected to be completed in 2018, but work took longer than expected. The COVID-19 pandemic and the Second Nagorno-Karabakh War slowed progress down further. In January 2023, Armenian Deputy Minister of Territorial Administration and Infrastructures Hakob Vardanyan stated that he expected the project to be complete by yearend. Once the project comes on steam, it will almost triple electricity exchange between the two neighbouring countries.

On January 23, 2021, Iran and Armenia signed a memorandum of understanding (MOU) to expand trading relations between the two countries. The MOU was signed by the Armenian Economy Minister Vahan Kerobyan and the Iranian Industry, Mining and Trade Minister Alireza Razm Hosseini, in Tehran. Accordingly, sectors such as the mining industry, foodstuff, and home appliances are in the main focus that provide ways for the two countries to establish mutual cooperation.

In 2026, the Armenian authorities announced their intention to double gas imports from Iran in exchange for increasing electricity exports to the Islamic Republic of Iran. Against this backdrop, Russian gas supplies to Armenia were temporarily suspended from 15 to 25 September 2026 due to scheduled maintenance work on the Russian section of the gas pipeline. To compensate, Armenia increased its gas imports from Iran.

== Tourism ==
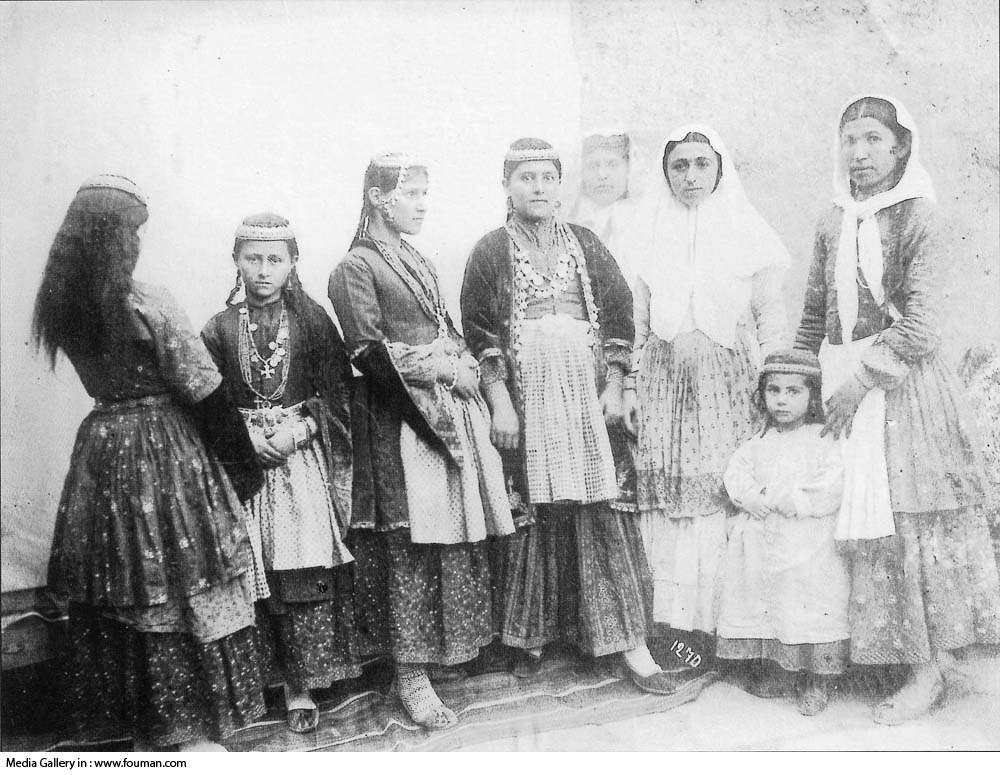
Iranian Armenian women in Qajar era

Armenia and Iran share extensive touristic ties. About 35,000 Iranian tourists visited Armenia in the first half of 2014, of a total of 495,967 tourists that had come to Armenia in the first half of 2014. This showed an increase of 17.3% compared to the same period last year. In 2014, Iran ranked 4th in the largest number of tourists that visit Armenia, behind Russia (44% of the total number of tourists), Georgia (28%), and the EU (Germany, France, Italy and Scandinavia). As of 2014, Iranian tourists amounted up to 7% of the total number of foreign tourists visiting Armenia.

The number of Iranian tourists visiting Armenia had been steadily on the rise for years, and the two nations have already unveiled plans to sign a memorandum on cooperation in the field of tourism.

"Iran is an important market for us. This country is not only our neighbor, but we have good neighborly relations with it, which is important for the sphere."

– Head of the Department of Tourism at Armenia's Ministry of Economy Mekhak Apresyan, July 2014.

Following the steady rise of Iranian tourists in Armenia, the number of Iranian visitors reached 180,000 in 2024, about 30,000 more than in 2023. This makes Iran one of the main sources of tourism in Armenia.

In 2024, the number of foreign tourism in Armenia has fallen by approximately 4.6%; however, the proportion of Iranian arrivals went up to 8,4% of the total number of incoming tourists in December.

The Armenian Tourism Development Strategy 2025-2029 identified Iran as the key target markets to which the tourism promotion should be directed in Armenia due to the increased significance of people-to-people contacts and the cross-border movements between the states.

== Cultural ties ==
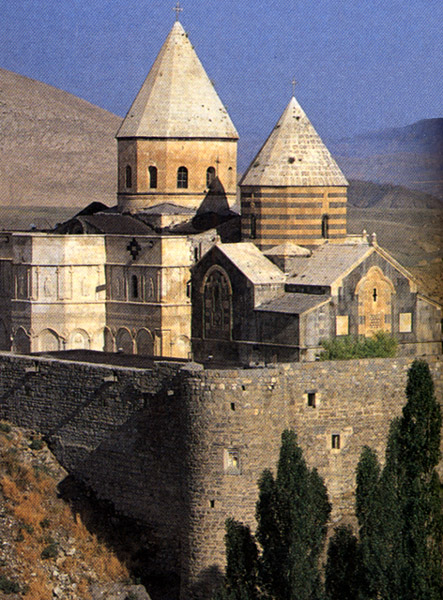
St. Thaddeus Monastery, or "Kara Kelissa", West Azarbaijan province. Believed by some to have been first built in 66 AD by Saint Jude. Part of the UNESCO's "Armenian Monastic Ensemble" of Iran.

Iranian Parthian and Persian have had a massive lexical impact on the Armenian language with a number of linguistic borrowings entering the Armenian language. In fact, when linguists tried to classify Armenian in the late 19th century, they (erroneously) classified it as an Iranian language. Heinrich Hübschmann, a German linguist, was the first to show that the Armenian language is an entirely separate Indo-European branch in its own right. Armenia and Iran are the only two countries in mainland West Asia to speak majority Indo-European languages.

Due to the very long intertwined histories, many of the millennia- and century-old Armenian chapels, monasteries and churches in the world can be found within modern-day Iran, including Saint Stepanos Monastery, St. Thaddeus Monastery and the Chapel of Dzordzor. These three ancient Armenian places of worship have been inscribed for several years now (since 2008) in the UNESCO World Heritage List, under the name of the "Armenian Monastic Ensemble of Iran."

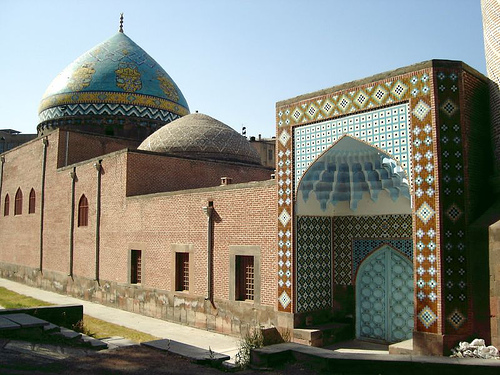
Blue Mosque, Yerevan, built during the Iranian rule over Armenia in the 18th century.

In recent years, Iran's cultural attaché to Armenia, Reza Atufi, has announced that the two countries have reached a preliminary agreement to make a joint television series. He said that the joint venture would portray the social and cultural life of Iran and Armenia and expand cinematic ties between the two countries.

=== Iranian-Armenians ===
The Armenian diaspora in Iran is one of the biggest and oldest Armenian communities in the world, as well as the largest in the Middle East. Although Armenians have a long history of interaction and intertwined socio-cultural record with Persia/Iran, Iran's Armenian community emerged when Shah Abbas relocated hundreds of thousands of Armenians from Nakhichevan, at that time on the frontier with the rivalling neighboring Ottoman Empire, to an area of Isfahan called New Julfa in the early 17th century, which was created to become an Armenian quarter. Iran quickly recognized the Armenians' dexterity in commerce. The community became active in the cultural and economic development of Iran.

The remaining Armenian minority in the Islamic Republic of Iran is still the largest Christian community in the country, ahead of the Assyrians. The Armenians remain the most powerful religious minority in Iran. They are appointed two seats in Iranian Parliament (the most within the Religious minority branch) and are the only minority with official Observing Status in the Guardian and Expediency Discernment Councils. Today in Iran there are about 150,000 – 300,000 Armenians left, half of which live in the Tehran area. A quarter live in Isfahan, and the other quarter is concentrated in Northwestern Iran or Iranian Azerbaijan. The majority of Armenians live in the suburbs of Tehran, most notably Narmak, Majidiyeh, Nadershah, etc.

== Diplomacy ==
Armenia

- Tehran (Embassy)

Iran

- Yerevan (Embassy)
- Kapan (Consulate-General)

== See also ==
- Persian Armenia
- Treaty of Turkmenchay
- Erivan khanate
- Abbas Mirza Mosque, Yerevan
- List of ambassadors of Iran to Armenia

== Sources ==
- Fisher, William Bayne; Avery, P.; Hambly, G. R. G; Melville, C. (1991). The Cambridge History of Iran. Vol. 7. Cambridge: Cambridge University Press. ISBN 0521200954.
- Giragosian, Richard (2017). "Twenty-Five Years On: Armenia's Difficult Period of State-Building". In Hunter, Shireen T. (ed.). The New Geopolitics of the South Caucasus: Prospects for Regional Cooperation and Conflict Resolution. Lexington Books. pp. 3–27. ISBN 978-1498564960.
