= Lists of Armenian churches =

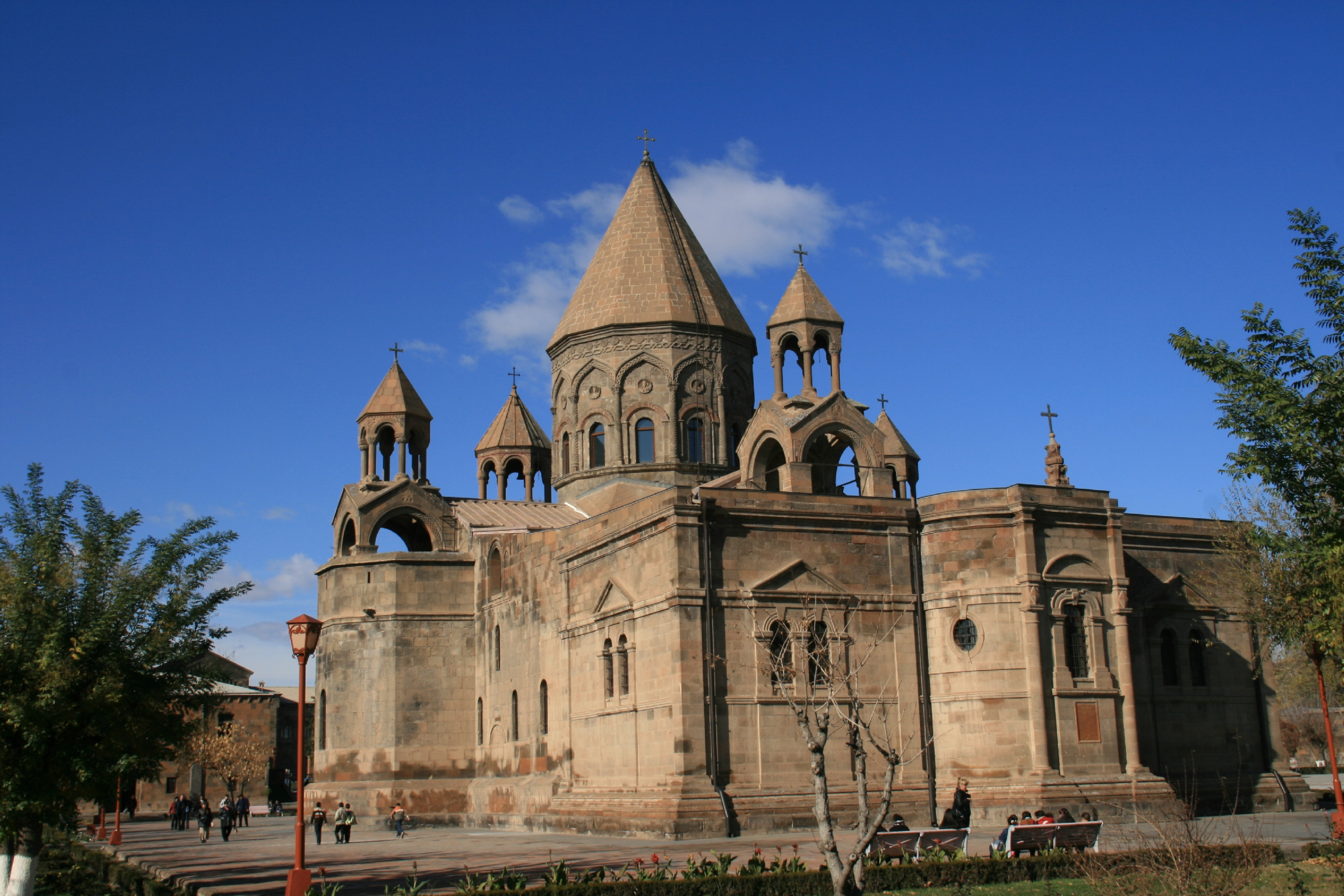
Etchmiadzin Cathedral, the mother church of the Armenian Apostolic Church

Lists of Armenian Churches cover Armenian Apostolic, Catholic or Evangelical church buildings in different countries.

== Armenia ==
- List of churches in Yerevan
- List of cathedrals in Armenia
- List of monasteries in Armenia

== Other countries ==
- List of Armenian churches in Azerbaijan
- List of Armenian churches in Iran
- List of Armenian churches in Russia
- Armenian churches of Tbilisi, Georgia
- List of active Armenian churches in Turkey

== See also ==
- Destroyed Armenian churches in Turkey
- Armenian Church (disambiguation)
