= Holy Mother of God Church, Vagharshapat =

Church

Coordinates: 40°09′54″N 44°17′32″E

Church of the Holy Mother of God Սուրբ Աստվածածին Եկեղեցի
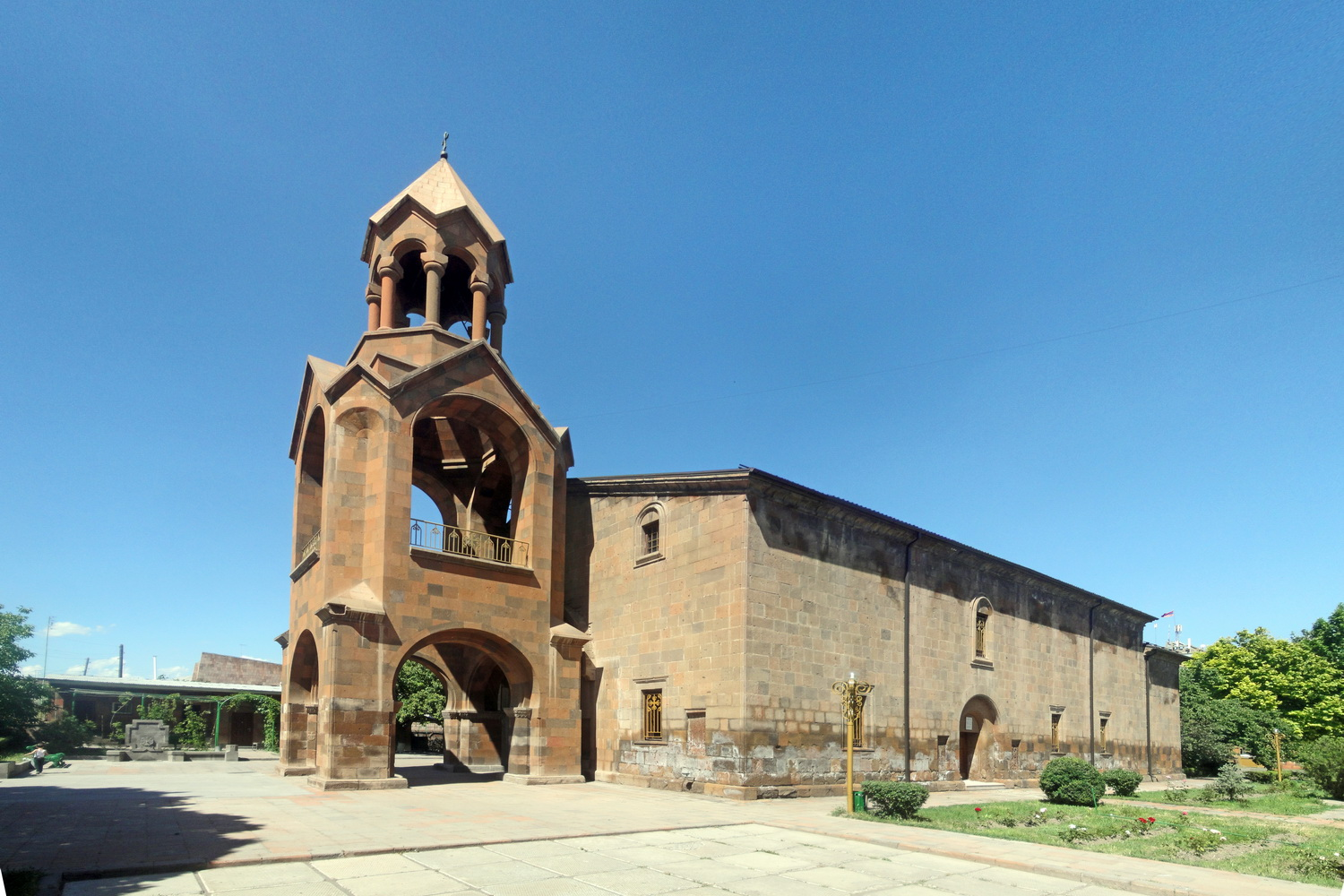
- Church of the Holy Mother of God

- Location within Armenia

Religion
- Affiliation: Armenian Apostolic Church

Location
- Location: Vagharshapat, Armavir Province, Armenia

Architecture
- Type: Single nave basilica with no dome
- Style: Armenian
- Completed: 1767

Church of the Holy Mother of God (Armenian: Սուրբ Աստվածածին Եկեղեցի), is a church located in the town of Vagharshapat, Armenia. It was built in 1767, during the reign of Catholicos Simeon I of Yerevan, on the remains of a 16th-century wooden church. It is located at the center of modern-day Vagharshapat, around 200 meters north of the walls of the Mother See of Holy Etchmiadzin.

== History and architecture ==
Prior to the construction of the church, a 16th-century wooden church used to stand on the same point of the modern-day church. According to a description left on a stone in one of the internal walls of the church, Holy Mother of God was built in 1767 with the initiation of Catholicos Simeon I of Yerevan.

The church belongs to the type of single nave basilicas with no dome. Many khachkars (cross stones) composed during the 18th century, were placed in the external walls of the church. The churchyard was home to a religious school.

During the Soviet period, the church remained active and witnessed a major renovation in 1986 through the efforts of Catholicos Vazgen I, when a belfry was built at the entrance as it never had a belfry prior to this renovation.

With the establishment of the Diocese of Armavir in 1996, the church has served as the seat of the diocese until 2014, when it was moved to the newly built Saint Gregory of Narek Church in the town of Armavir.

== Gallery ==
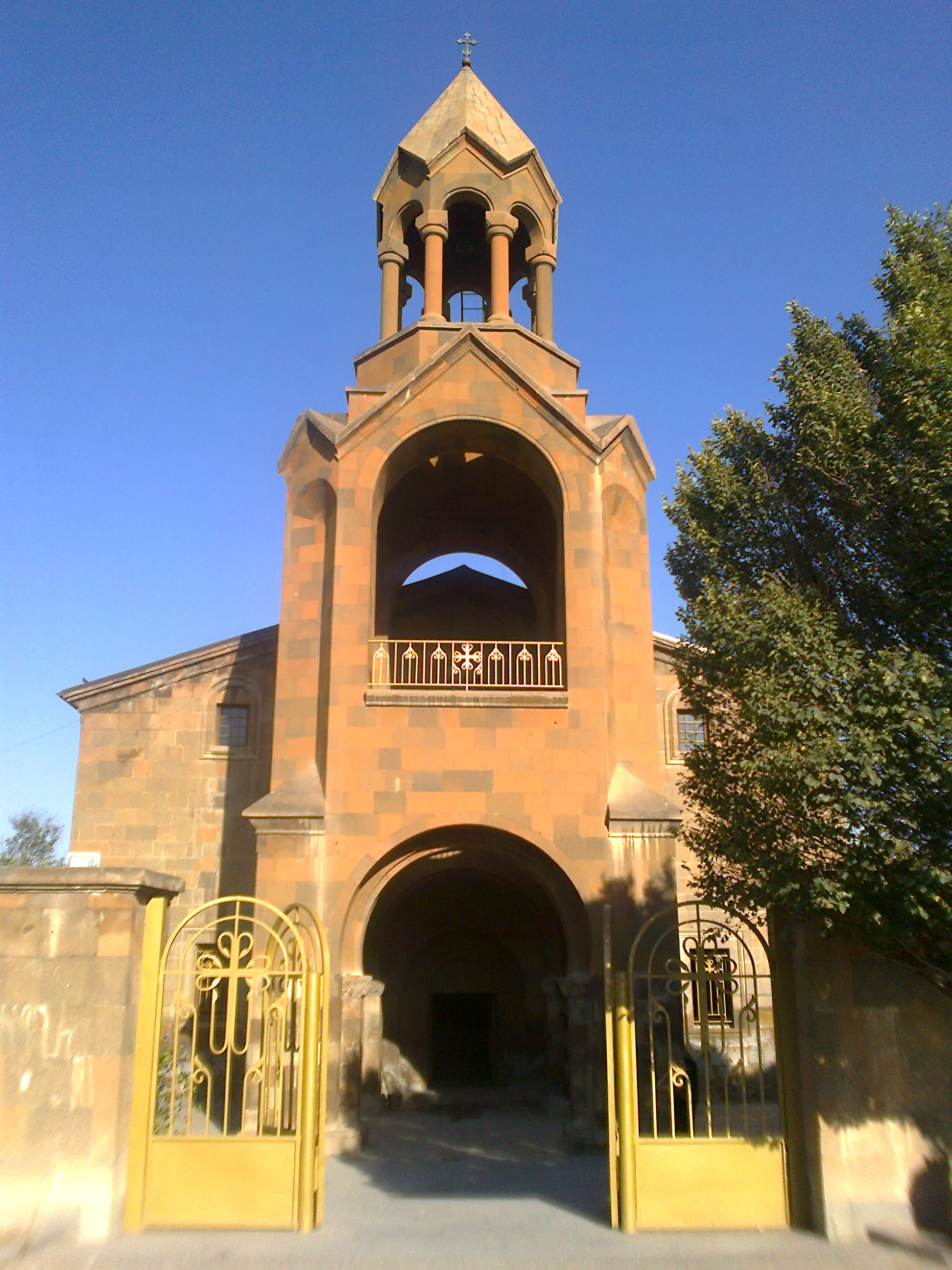
The belfry at the entrance

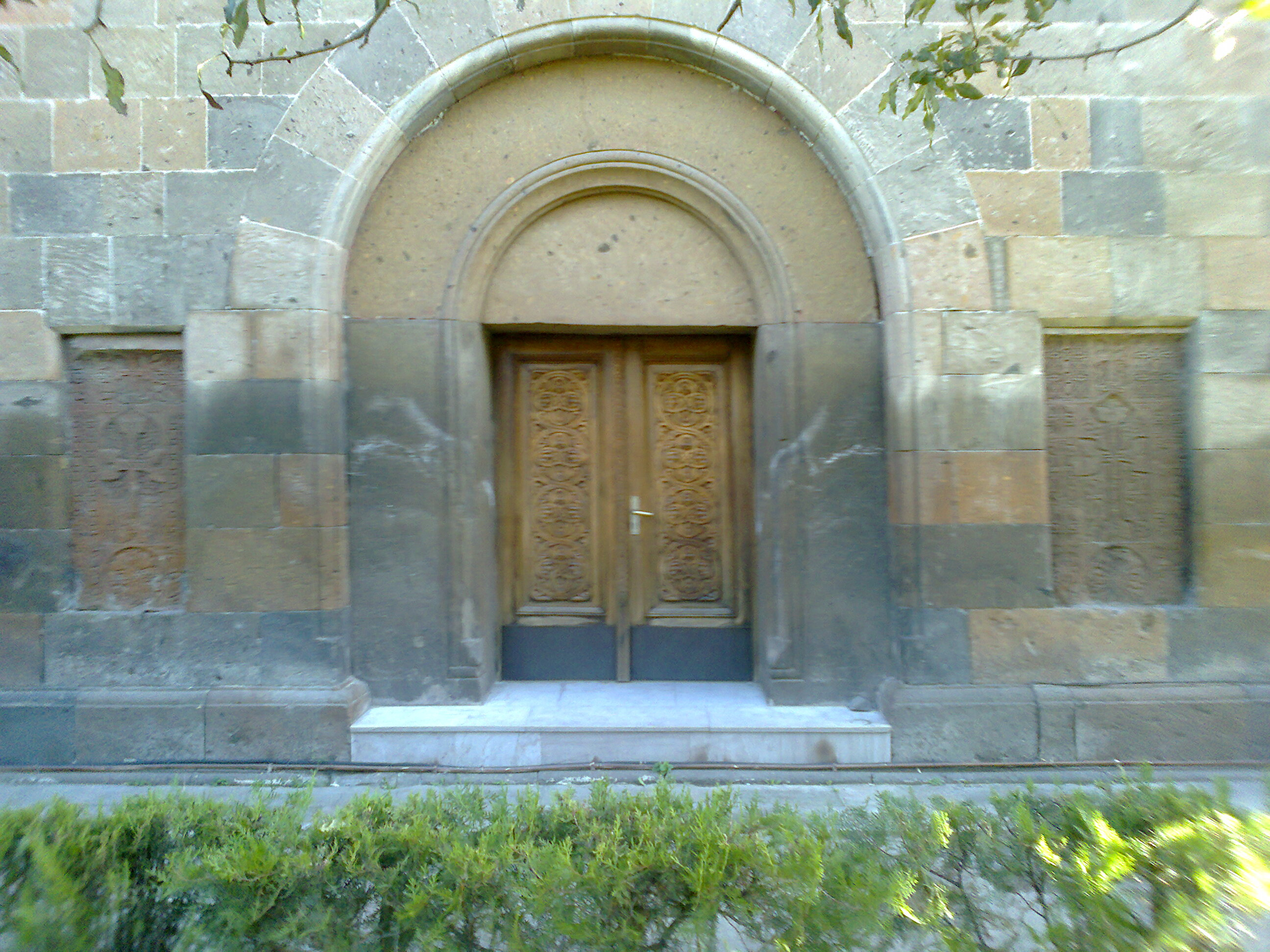
Khachkars on the external walls

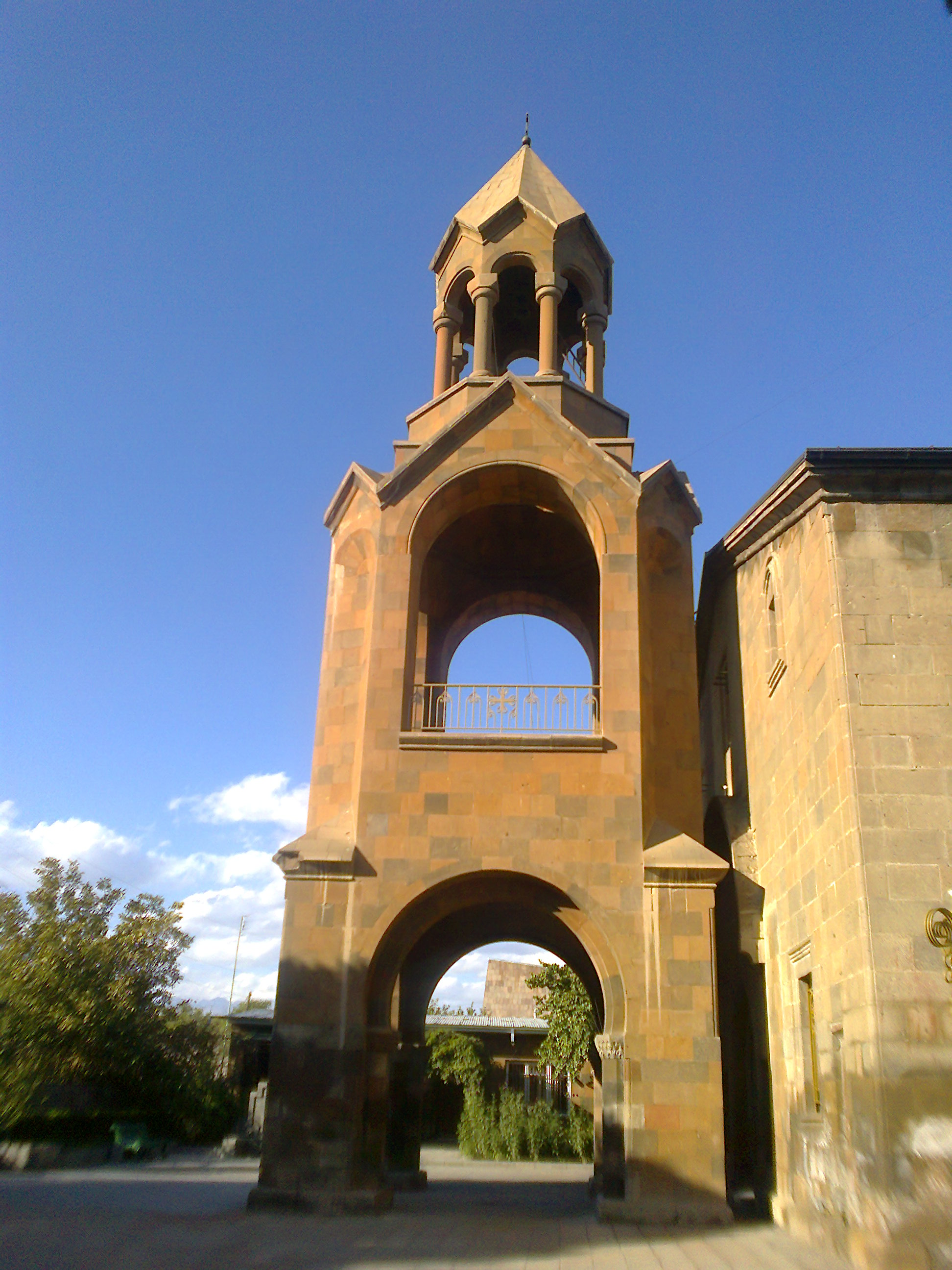
Side view of the belfry

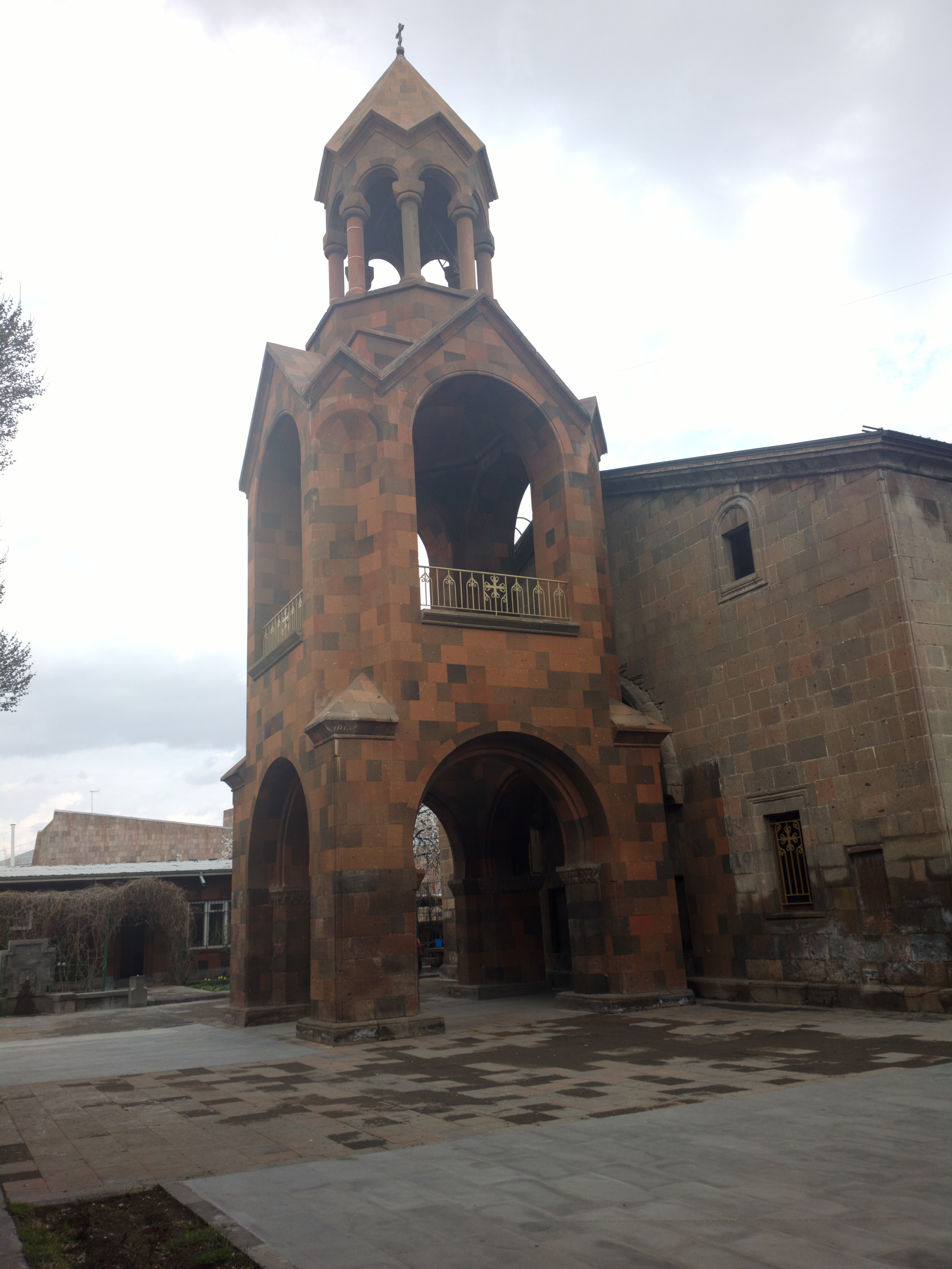
