= Targmanchats monastery, Aygeshat =

Cultural heritage monument of Armenia

Targmanchats Vank Թարգմանչաց վանք
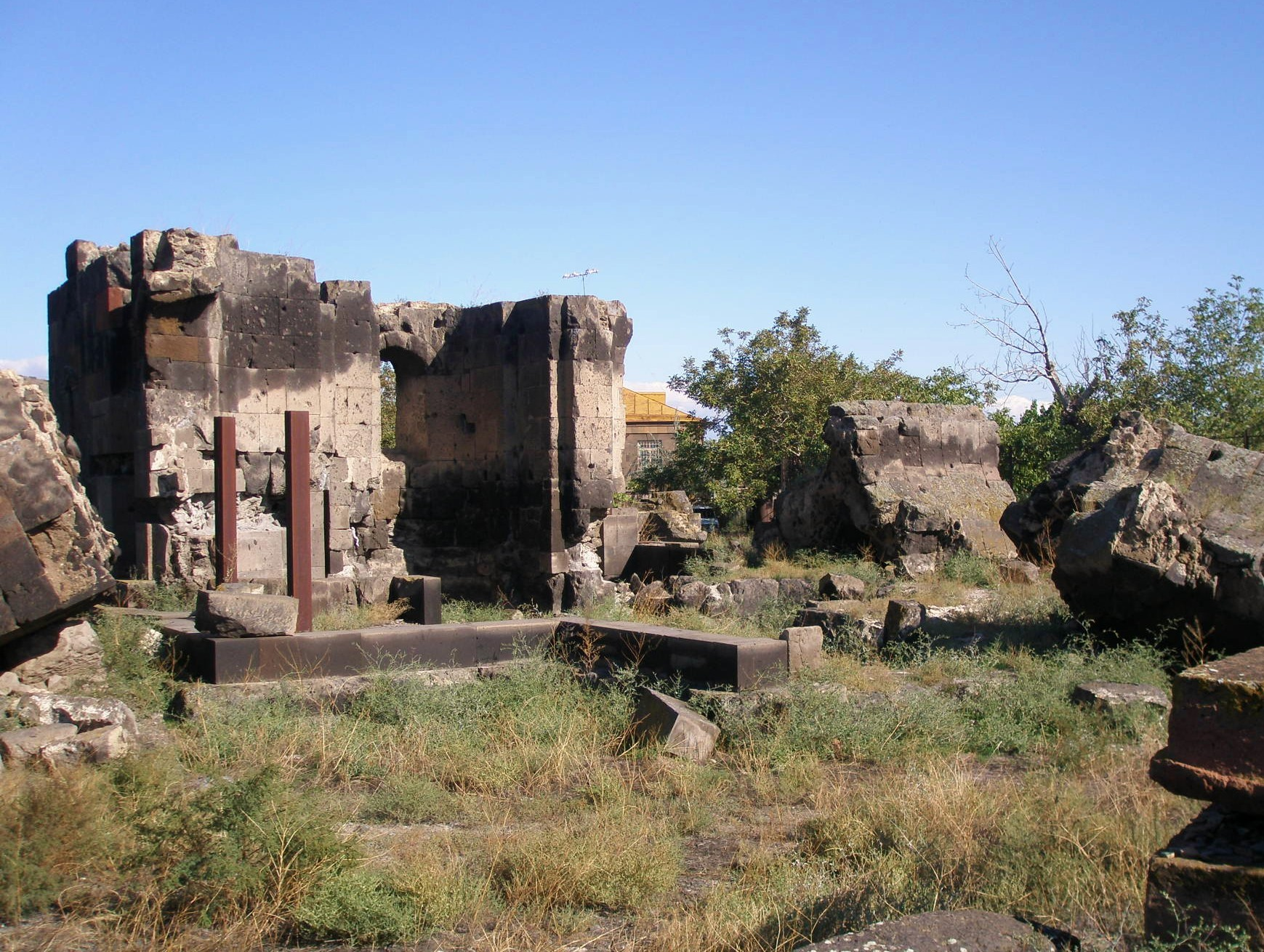
- Ruins of Targmanchats Vank, September 2009.

- Location within Armenia

Religion
- Affiliation: Armenian Apostolic Church
- Status: Inactive, ruins

Location
- Location: Aygeshat, Armavir Province, Armenia
- Coordinates: 40.235896°N 44.288905°E

Architecture
- Style: Armenian
- Completed: 6th-7th century

Targmanchats Vank (Armenian: Թարգմանչաց վանք; meaning "Translators Monastery") of the 6th to 7th century is located within the village of Aygeshat in the Armavir Province of Armenia just off the main road through town. The site is gated and one must inquire about accessing the church.

== Architecture ==
Much of Targmanchats Vank is currently in ruin with the exception of the extant eastern portion of the church's wings. Massive sections of other walls remain relatively intact, though toppled from their original foundations and strewn about the premises. The church is mostly unadorned and simple in style. There are some gravestones as well as other more ancient carved stones nearby. The workings of a modern restoration attempt with the start of a new foundation and structural steel supports are clearly visible.

== Gallery ==
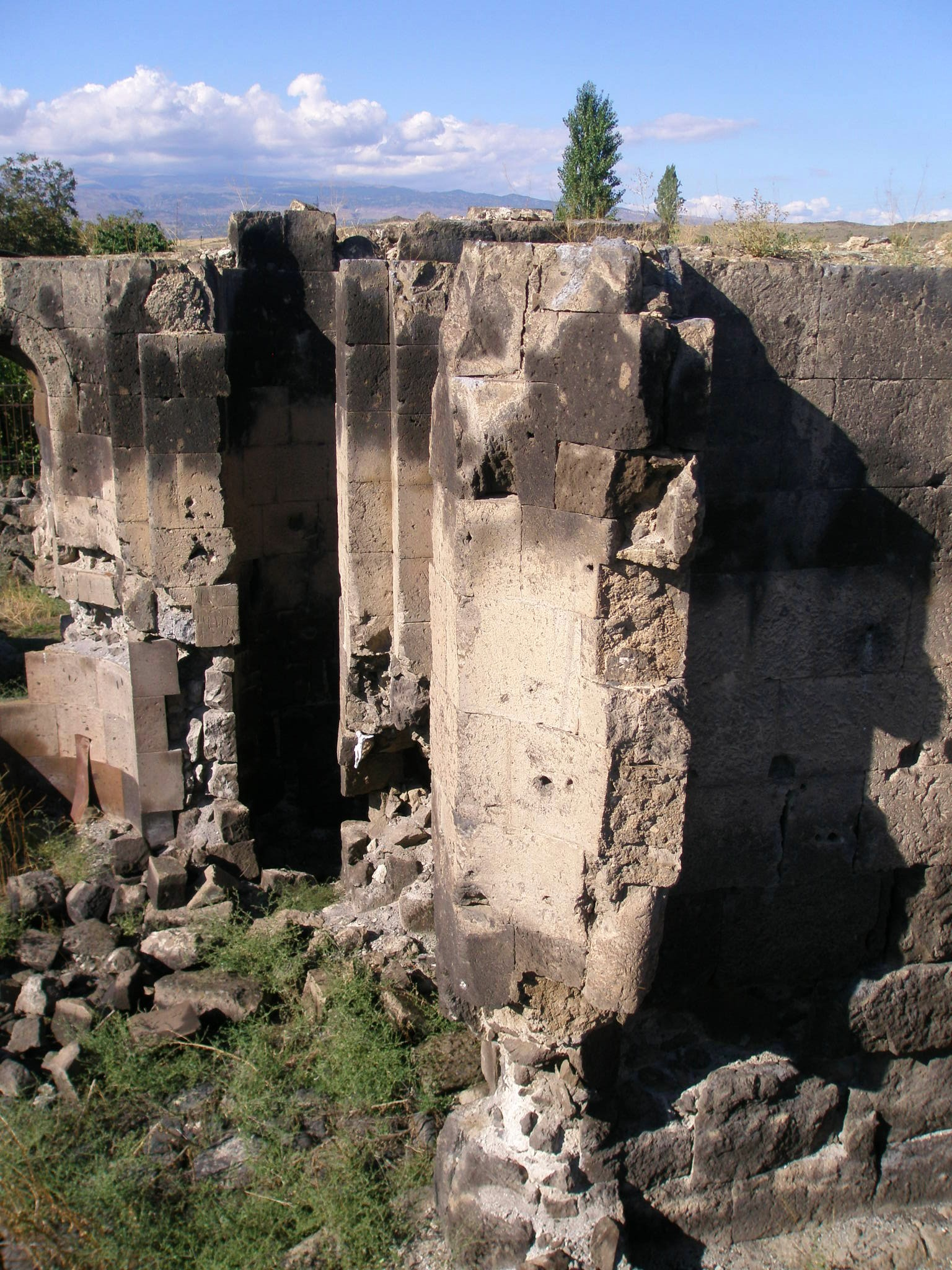
Another view of the ruins.
