= Aygeshat, Khoy =

Aygeshat Այգեշատ
- Location within Armenia
- Coordinates: 40°14′09″N 44°17′12″E
- Country: Armenia
- Province: Armavir

Area
  - Total: 4.98 km^{2} (1.92 sq mi)
- Elevation: 870 m (2,850 ft)

Population (2011)
  - Total: 1,798
  - Density: 361/km^{2} (935/sq mi)
- Time zone: UTC+4 ( )
  - Summer (DST): UTC+5 ( )

Aygeshat (Armenian: Այգեշատ; also, Aigeshat, known as Hajighara until 1935), is a village in the Armavir Province of Armenia. It is home to the ruined 6th- to 7th-century Targmanchats Vank or Church of Surb Targmanchats (Holy Translators' Church). There is also an early tower of Adar Davit on a hill nearby from the 2nd or 1st centuries BC. There is also a monument dedicated to the victims of World War II, 2nd- to 1st-century tombs, 10th- to 18th-century graves, and an early 19th-century wall. The village has a school (235 students), first aid station, house of culture, and a community center.

== Gallery ==
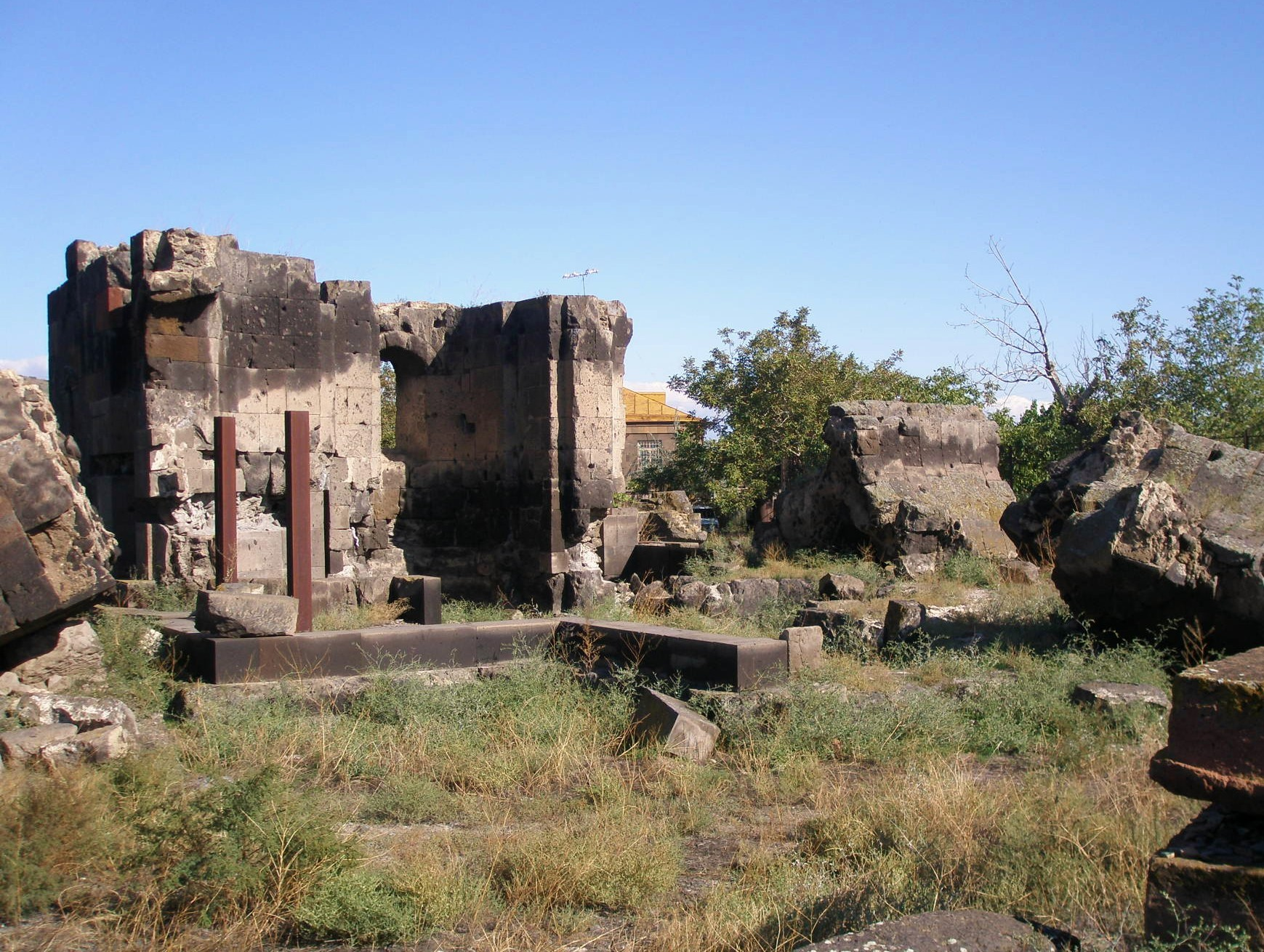
Ruins of the 6th- or 7th-century Targmanchats Vank

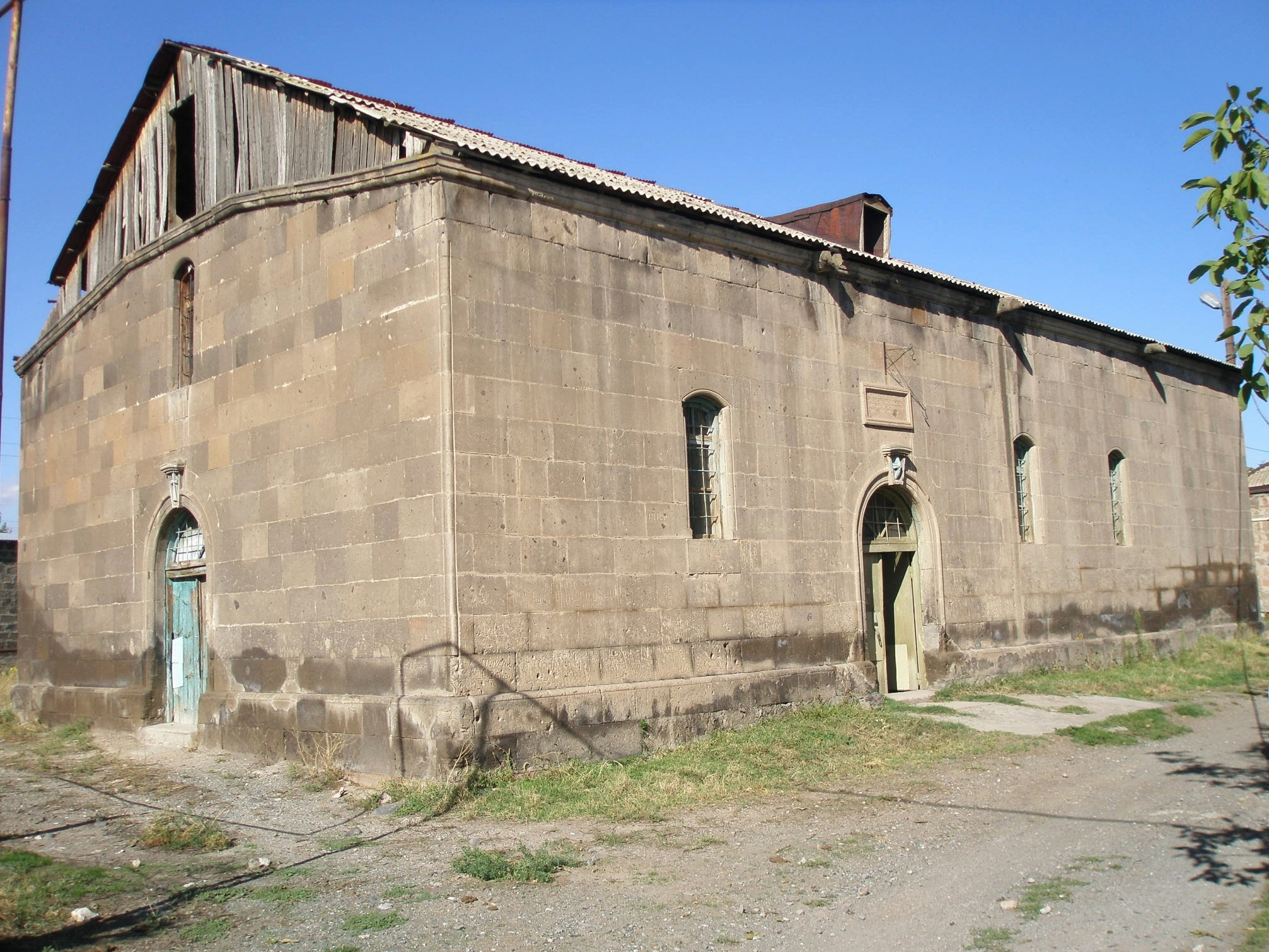
Holy Mother of God Church, 19th century

== See also ==
- Armavir Province
