= Aygeshat, Metsamor =

Village in Armavir, Armenia

Aygeshat Այգեշատ
- Location within Armenia
- Coordinates: 40°04′N 44°04′E
- Country: Armenia
- Province: Armavir
- Municipality: Metsamor
- Founded: 18th century

Population (2011)
  - Total: 1,547
- Time zone: UTC+4 ( )
  - Summer (DST): UTC+5 ( )

Aygeshat (Armenian: Այգեշատ), known as Ghuzigidan until 1950, is a village in the Armavir Province of Armenia.
