= Ahmad Sobhani =

Iranian diplomat

Ahmad Sobhani (Persian: احمد سبحانی, born 1961 in Tehran) is a retired Iranian diplomat who previously served as Iran's ambassador to Venezuela (2001–2006) and Gabon (1995–1998), in addition to chargé d'affaires in Armenia (1993–1994). He also served as the deputy foreign minister for European and American Affairs under Manouchehr Mottaki (2007–2010).

== Career ==
During the Iran–Iraq War, Sobhani was a member of the Islamic Revolutionary Guard Corps. In 1987, he entered Iran's diplomatic service.

Between 1993 and 1994, Sobhani served as Iran's chargé d'affaires in Armenia. He later served as Iran's ambassador to Gabon between March 1995 and July 1998. During this same period he was also the accredited ambassador to Cameroon, Equatorial Guinea, São Tomé and Príncipe and the Central African Republic.

In 1999, he returned to Iran where he served as the Ministry of Foreign Affairs' director for citizenship and refugees affairs until 2001. Between October 2001 and September 2006, Sobhani served as Iran's ambassador to Venezuela, during which the two countries expanded their political, military and economic ties significantly. At that time he also served as the accredited ambassador to Guyana, the Dominican Republic, Haiti, Suriname, Trinidad and Tobago. Sobhani served as one of 54 international observers appointed by Venezuela's National Electoral Council during the 2005 Venezuelan parliamentary election.

Between 2007 and 2010, Sobhani served as deputy foreign minister for European and American affairs, replacing Saeed Jalili. Later, between 2010 and 2013, he served as the director general for West Asia affairs. He has since retired from diplomatic service.

Sobhani has publicly said that diplomats must be "wealth generators" for their countries. Following his retirement he has served as a member of the leadership council of Alend Investment and Development Economic Cooperation Co., a company whose aim is to increase trade between Iran and Latin American countries.

== Personal life ==
Sobhani's brother Hassan Sobhani was killed in battle in 1984 during the Iran–Iraq War.

Sobhani's son Mohammad Javad "Sasha" Sobhani, born in 1988, has attracted international media attention as a result of his social media presence, which includes pictures of him living an extravagant and non-Islamic lifestyle in Europe. In August 2018, Ahmad Sobhani told Iranian media that he had severed ties with Sasha. He said of their relationship: "He is my son, but in terms of lifestyle and beliefs, he differs from me, and all of my attempts to direct him to the right path failed."

Sobhani's siblings, Hossein and Zahra Sobhani, are the owners of Avin Darou Co., an Iranian pharmaceutical import company founded in 2008. The company has been criticised for being one of the largest recipients of foreign exchange from the Central Bank of Iran at the subsidized official exchange rate.

== Honours ==
- Grand Cordon of the Order of the Liberator (6 September 2006, Venezuela)

Diplomatic posts
Preceded by Bahram Ghasemi	Chargé d'affaires of Iran in Armenia; 1993–1994	Succeeded by Hamidreza Nikkar-Esfahani
Preceded by Hoshmand Sijani	Ambassador of Iran to Gabon; 1995–1998	Succeeded by Hossein Abdi Abyaneh
Preceded by Mohammad Keshavarzzadeh	Ambassador of Iran to Venezuela; 2001–2006	Succeeded by Abdollah Zifan
Preceded by Saeed Jalili	Deputy Foreign Minister for European and American Affairs; 2007–2010	Succeeded by Ali Ahani
Preceded by Mohammad Ali Ghanezadeh	Director General for West Asia Affairs; 2010–2013	Succeeded by Seyed Rasoul Eslami
