= Armenian wine =

Wine making in Armenia

Vineyards of Armenia
- Wine region
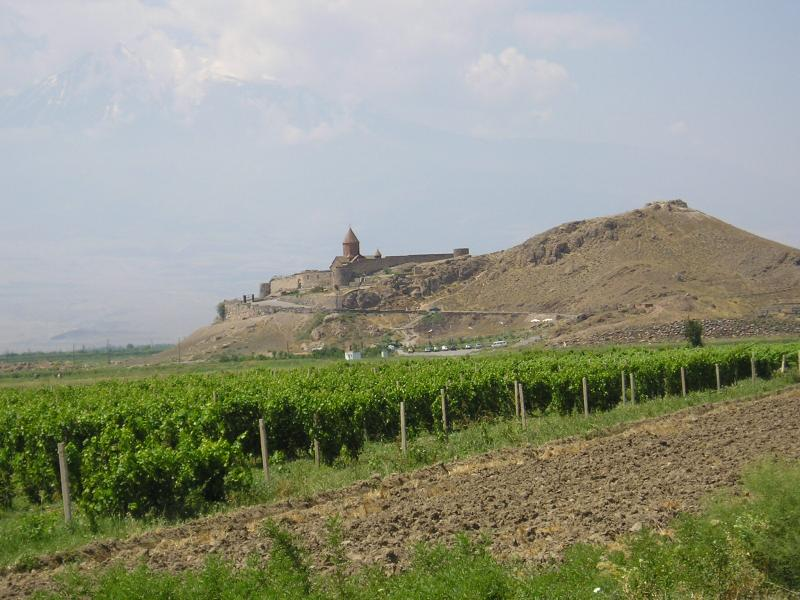
- Other names: Armenian wine
- Country: Armenia
- Sub-regions: Armavir Province; Ararat Province; Vayots Dzor In Artsakh: Hadrut
- Growing season: Cold snowy winters Warm, dry, sunny summers
- Climate region: Continental
- Heat units: Region III, IV, V
- Precipitation (annual average): 400–600 mm
- Soil conditions: Volcanic soil
- Total area: 29,800 km^{2} (12,000 sq mi)
- Size of planted vineyards: 1,459 km^{2} (1,000 sq mi); Ranked 11th
- Varietals produced: Areni, Kangun, Voskehat, Vitis vinifera, Pinot noir, Pinot blanc, Aligoté, Madrasa (grape)

Armenian wine comes from one of the oldest wine producing regions of the world, with clear evidence of the first production beginning in the 5th millennium BCE.

Red, white and rose wines are produced throughout Armenia, which has seen a transformation in quality and global recognition since the end of the Soviet era, when much Armenian wine was produced by collectives as bulk wine or used for sherry or brandy production. Today many Armenian wines are celebrated for their exceptional quality and unique character.

== History ==
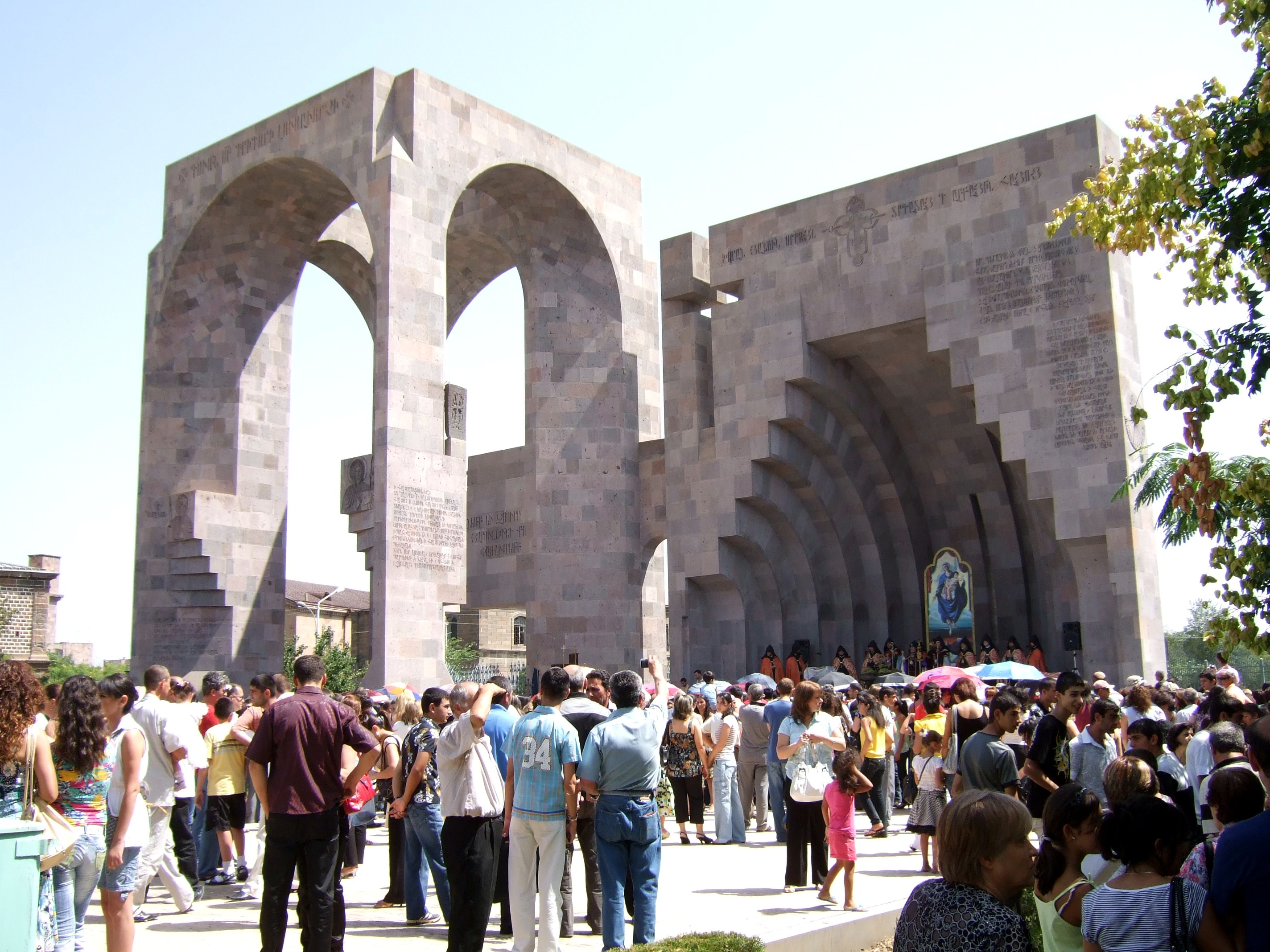
Celebration of the holiday Khaghoghorhneq at Etchmiadzin, near the gate of Saint Gregory and the open-air altar

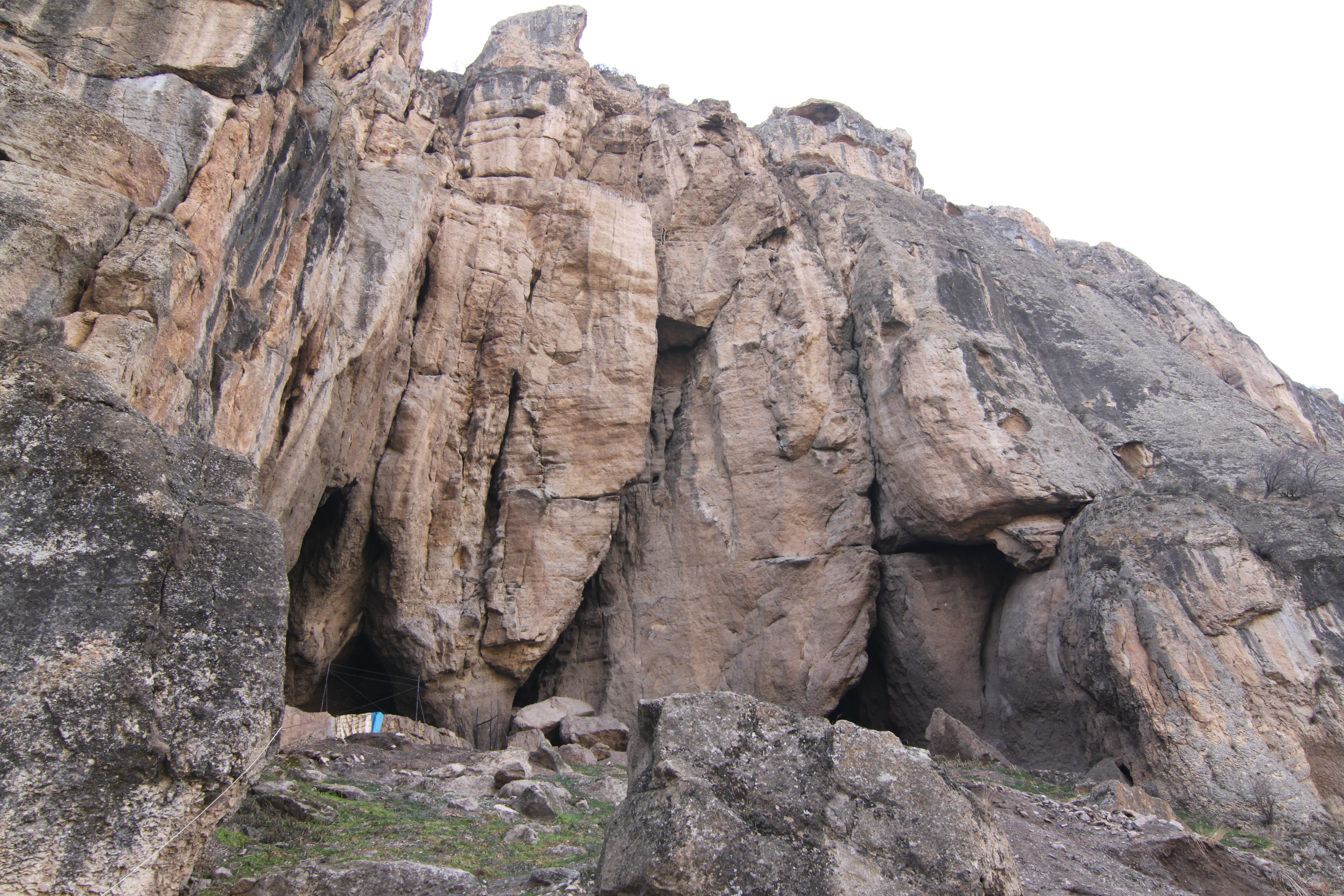
Areni-1 cave entrance

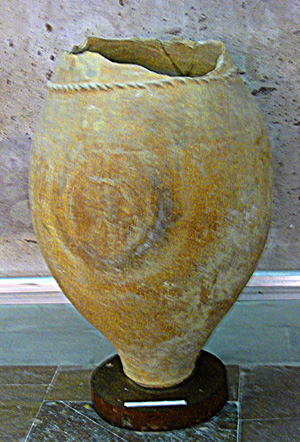
Urartian wine pottery

The ancient winery found by archaeologists in the Areni cave complex dates back to 4100 BC, and is the oldest wine production site in the world, with grape seeds at the site shown by genetic analyses to be those of the already domesticated Vitis vinifera.

The written recorded history of Armenian wine can trace its roots back to 401–400 BC, when the Greek armies led by Xenophon passed through Armenian lands and were reportedly treated with wine and beer. These beverages were prepared and stored in "karases" (clay pots). Archaeological excavations carried out by academic Pyatrovski in the 19th and 20th centuries have confirmed that in the 9th century BC, what is modern-day Yerevan was a wine-making centre.

Archaeologists have also found wine storehouses with 480 karases in the Teishebaini fortress located in Yerevan. Each karas can reportedly hold up to 37,000 daL of wine. Excavation works in both the Karmir Blur and Erebuni sites uncovered a total of 10 wine storehouses holding 200 karases. These excavations proved Armenia's ancient wine-making culture. A 3rd to 1st century BCE wine press was discovered near Armenia's old capitals Armavir and Dvin, and another was discovered near the ruins of the fortress of Garni which was used as the summer residence of pagan, as well as Christian Armenian kings.

In Armenia, many holidays, like the water festival Vardavar or the grape blessing festival Khaghoghorhneq have their roots in pagan rituals. According to Christian tradition, Jesus Christ shed his life-giving blood, represented during Christian holidays by wine, for the cleansing of the sins of mankind. That is why on Armenian cross-stones, the cross is carved as the tree of life, also called the blooming cross, symbolizing the grape vine or a pomegranate tree. Grapes and pomegranates are also frequently used to decorate cross stones, and are used as ornaments decorating the walls of churches, symbolizing eternity and rebirth. Carvings on Armenian churches and cross-stones, as well as paintings in manuscripts, show what importance grapes and wine had in medieval Armenian culture. Door frames of churches and the edges of cross-stones often depict embroidered ornaments which look like intertwined grape wines, representing the Garden of Eden.

As part of the Soviet Union, wine production increased nine times between 1940 and 1985, while brandy production increased seventeen times, and from 1960 to 1986, the production of sparkling wines increased 10 times. In the 1980s Armenia annually processed an average of about 210 thousand tons of grapes from which it received 14–15 million decalitres of wine. Two million were used in producing brandy; the remaining part was used for wine making. During the 1980s Armenia provided 25% of brandy made in the entire Soviet Union. Three quarters of released production was exported mainly to Russia. Many people today still utilise the same methods used three millennials ago, processing grapes and receive wine in special premises. Nowadays most factories in Armenia use oak barrels to store wine, however many villages and smaller producers still use the traditional karases. Karases are traditionally made out of Armenian oak, thus giving the karases a pinkish color. Wines from local Armenian grades of grapes adjoining to the surface of the barrels from the Armenian oak, give rise to unique a bouquet. This unique combination is very difficult to the point of being almost impossible to reproduce in any other country of the world.

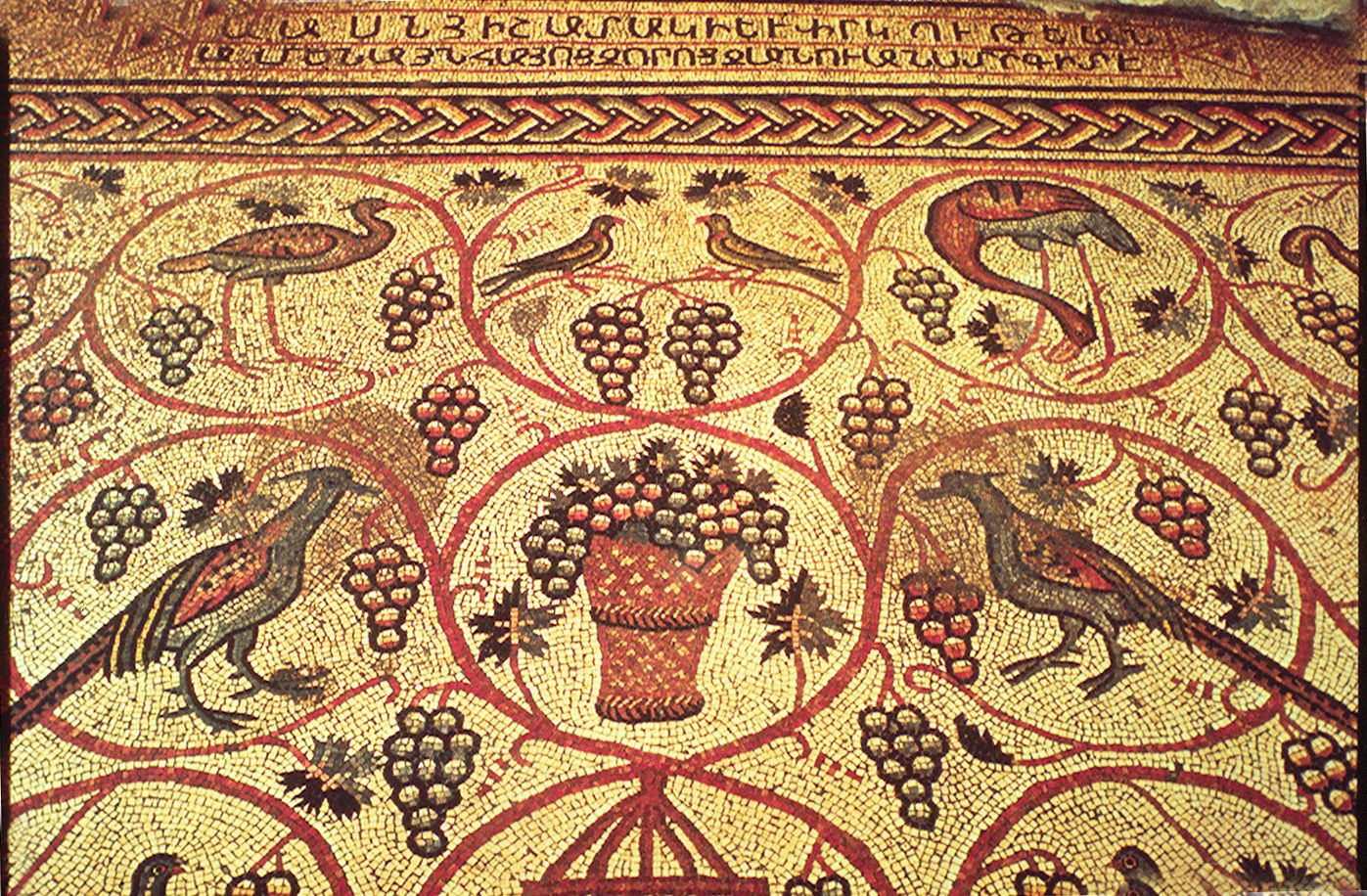
Armenian mosaic and inscription at Jerusalem

The fertile valleys of the South Caucasus, which Armenia finds itself in, are believed by many archaeologists to be the source of the world's first cultivated grapevines and neolithic wine production, over 6100 years ago. Armenian wine played an important role in the history of wine, and it has been suggested that the domestication of the Eurasian grape first occurred in the mountainous regions of Armenia before moving to the south. During all this time they never stopped making wine. They were one of the main wine producers in the Soviet Union and have since started exporting their wine worldwide. Armenian wine spread to Africa. During the Armenian genocide perpetrated by the Ottoman Empire during World War I, some Armenians fled to Ethiopia, where they cultivated vineyards. Many Armenian reds are very sweet and rich. During periods of Islamic rule, Armenians were the suppliers of alcoholic beverages, such as wine, to the Muslims, who were not allowed to distill alcohol.

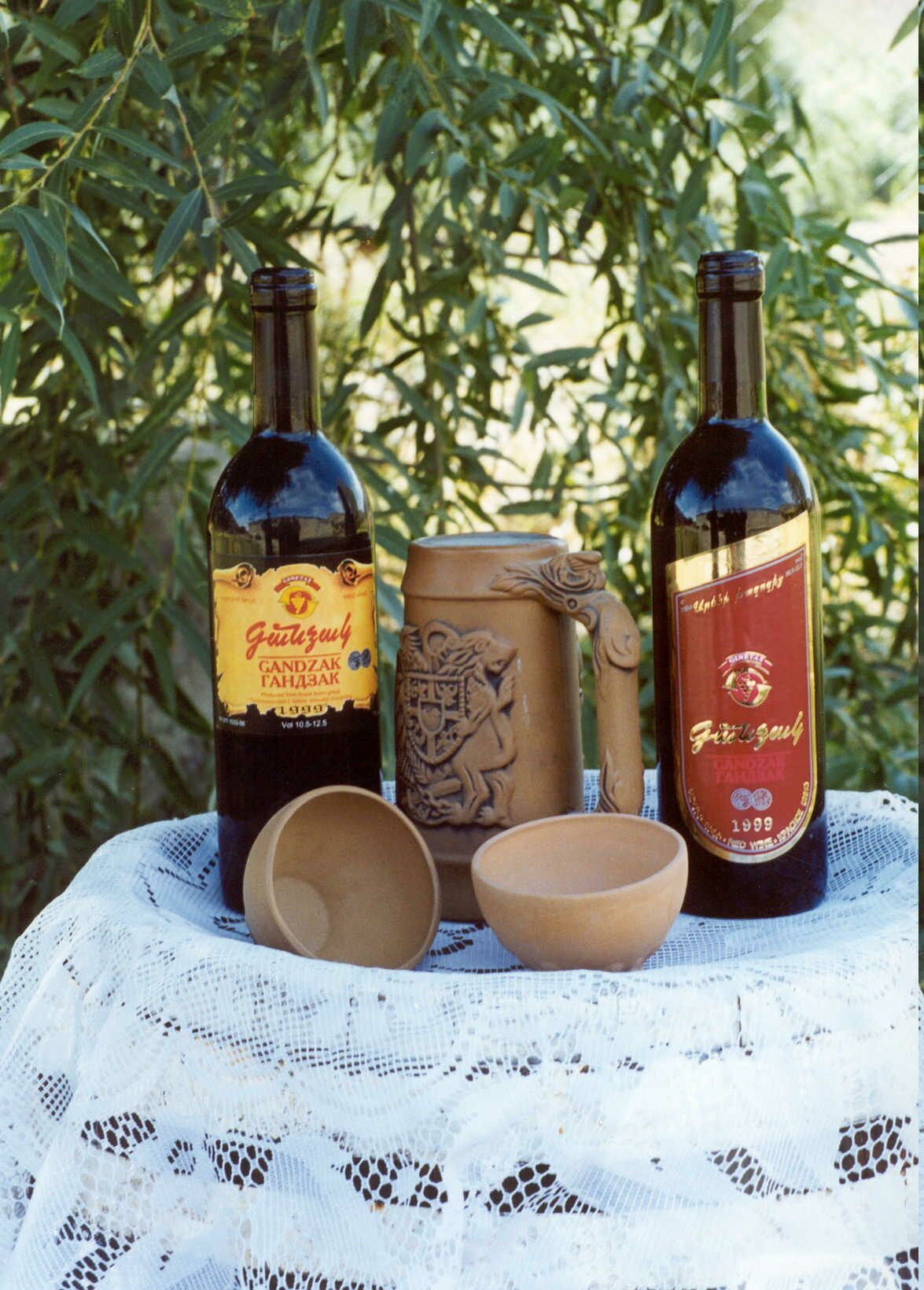
Gandzak wine

In 2011 archaeologists in Armenia announced the discovery of the world's oldest-known wine production facility. Located in the Areni cave complex, it consists of a shallow basin used to press grapes, a vat for storage, and fermentation jars. They also found grape seeds, remains of pressed grapes, and dozens of dried vines. The seeds were from Vitis vinifera, a grape still used to make wine. The cave remains date to about 4100 BC – 900 years before the earliest comparable wine remains, found in Egyptian tombs. Archaeologist Gregory Areshian of UCLA says, "The site gives us a new insight into the earliest phase of horticulture—how they grew the first orchards and vineyards."

Gregory Areshian, co-director of the excavation and assistant director of the University of California Los Angeles's Cotsen Institute of Archaeology stated that "It's the oldest proven case of documented and dedicated wine production, stretching back the horizons of this important development by thousands of years,"

== Wine-making in Armenia ==
=== Wine production during the Soviet era ===
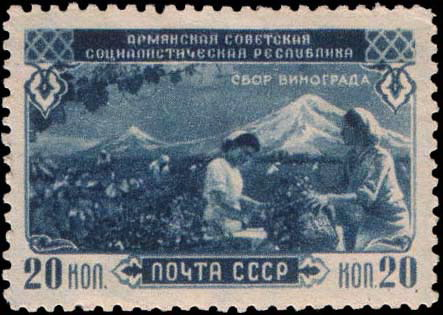
Grape harvest in the Armenian SSR depicted on a 1950 Soviet stamp.

During the Soviet Union, specifically during 1930 and 1970, winemaking studies were developed specifically for the sherry type. The production of sherry type wines had a significant role in the development of viticultural technologies of the Soviet Union. In the regions of the former USSR, sherry type wines were produced in Crimea, Moldova, Kazakhstan, Krasnodar, Rostov, and Armenia. Many scientific sources indicate that during the Soviet Union the production of sherry type wines was mainly focused in Armenia. The production of sherry wine in Armenia was established by N.N. Prostoserdov and R.L. Afrikyan, two prominent Soviet oenologists. In 1931 Prostoserdov and Afrikyan discovered that non-hermetic karases (Armenian clay amphorae) produce pellicles. The reason for the formation of pellicles on the surface of the wine was found to be the Sacch.cheresiensis armeniensis yeast similar to those found in Spanish wines. This discovery thus proved that sherry yeast can be found not only in Spanish but also in wines of other countries.

Armenian sherry type wines are made from the Voskehat (Kharji) and Chilar ingenious grape varieties. Armenian sherry was considered a high quality wine and was second in volume of production after Armenian brandy production. Ashtarak was the first sherry type wine produced in Soviet Armenia. It was produced by the Ashtarak Wine Factory, subdivisions of which were situated in Oshakan and village Voskevaz.

=== Current status ===
A large number wineries and vineyards are found throughout the provinces of Armenia. Here is a list of wineries/distilleries/producers of alcoholic drinks, classified by the provinces of Armenia:

==== Aragatsotn Province ====
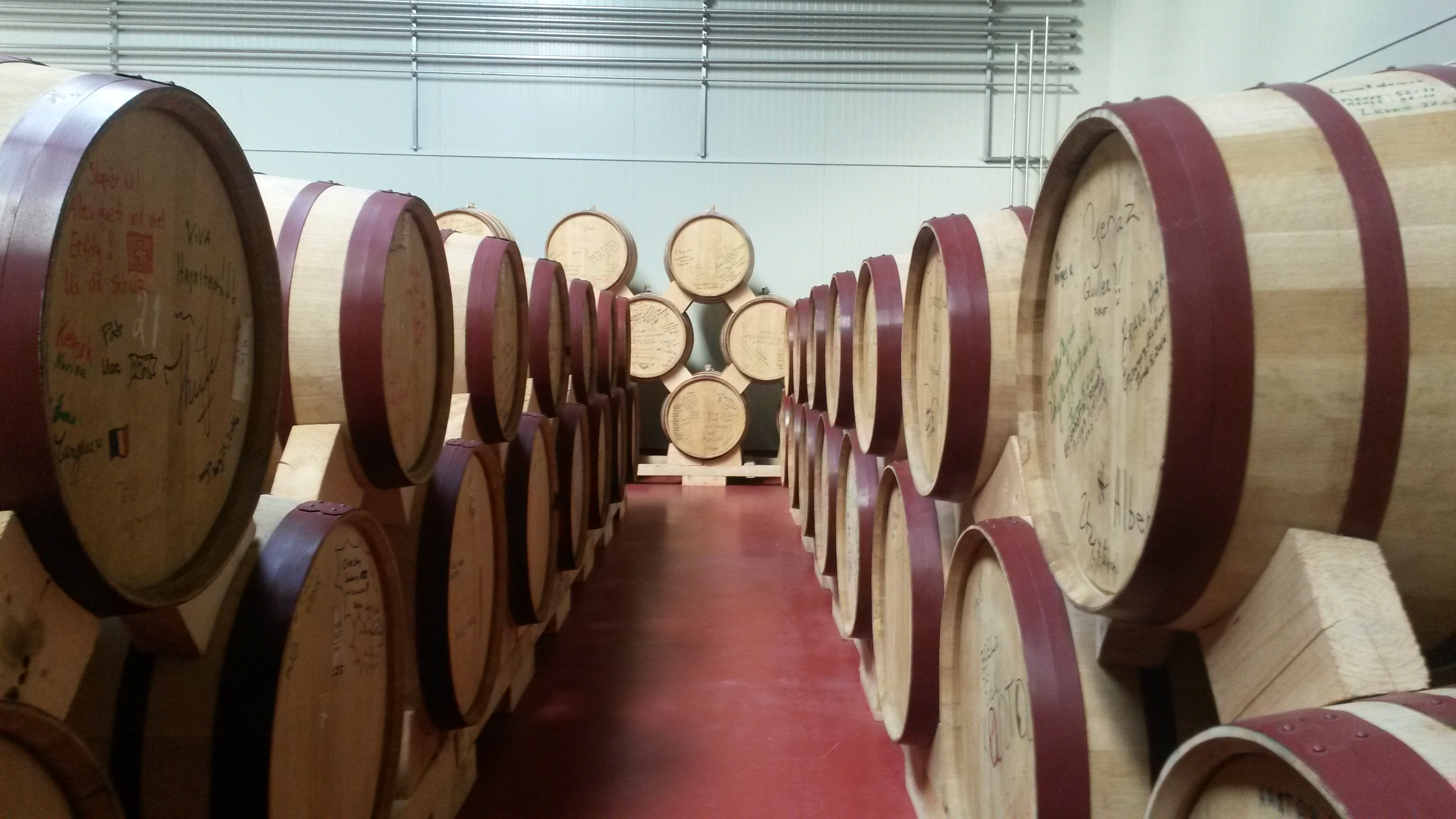
ArmAs Winery

The wine produced in Aragatsotn is mainly from the vineyards located to the south of the Aragats and Arteni mountains. The village of Voskevaz has an ancient history of wine-making. Many karases were found in the nearby church of Surp Hovhannes, dating back to the 7th century.

- Voskevaz Winery, opened in 1932 in Voskevaz. The winery produces a variety of wine, mainly under the brands Vanakan, Voskevaz, Urzana, Voskehat, Voskevaz Areni Noir, and Chateau Voskevaz. The winery's Voskevaz Areni Noir red dry wine was awarded gold medal at the Mundus Vini 18th Grand International Wine Award, took place in Germany.
- ArmAs Winery, opened in 2007 in Nor Yedesia. The winery produces a variety of Areni wine under the brand ArmAs.
- Armenia Wine Winery, opened in 2008 in Sasunik. The factory produces wine under the brands Tariri, Takar and Armenia. It also produces the Armenia Champagne.
- Hayasy Group, opened in 2011 in Voskevaz. The winery produces a variety of Armenian cognac under the brand Hayasy. It also produces the Hayasy Vodka.
- Wine House Winery, opened in 2011 in Aghdzk. The winery produces a variety of wine under the brands Sarduri and Old Wine.
- Van Ardi Winery, opened in 2013 in Sasunik. The winery produces a variety of wine under the brand Van Ardi.

==== Ararat Province ====
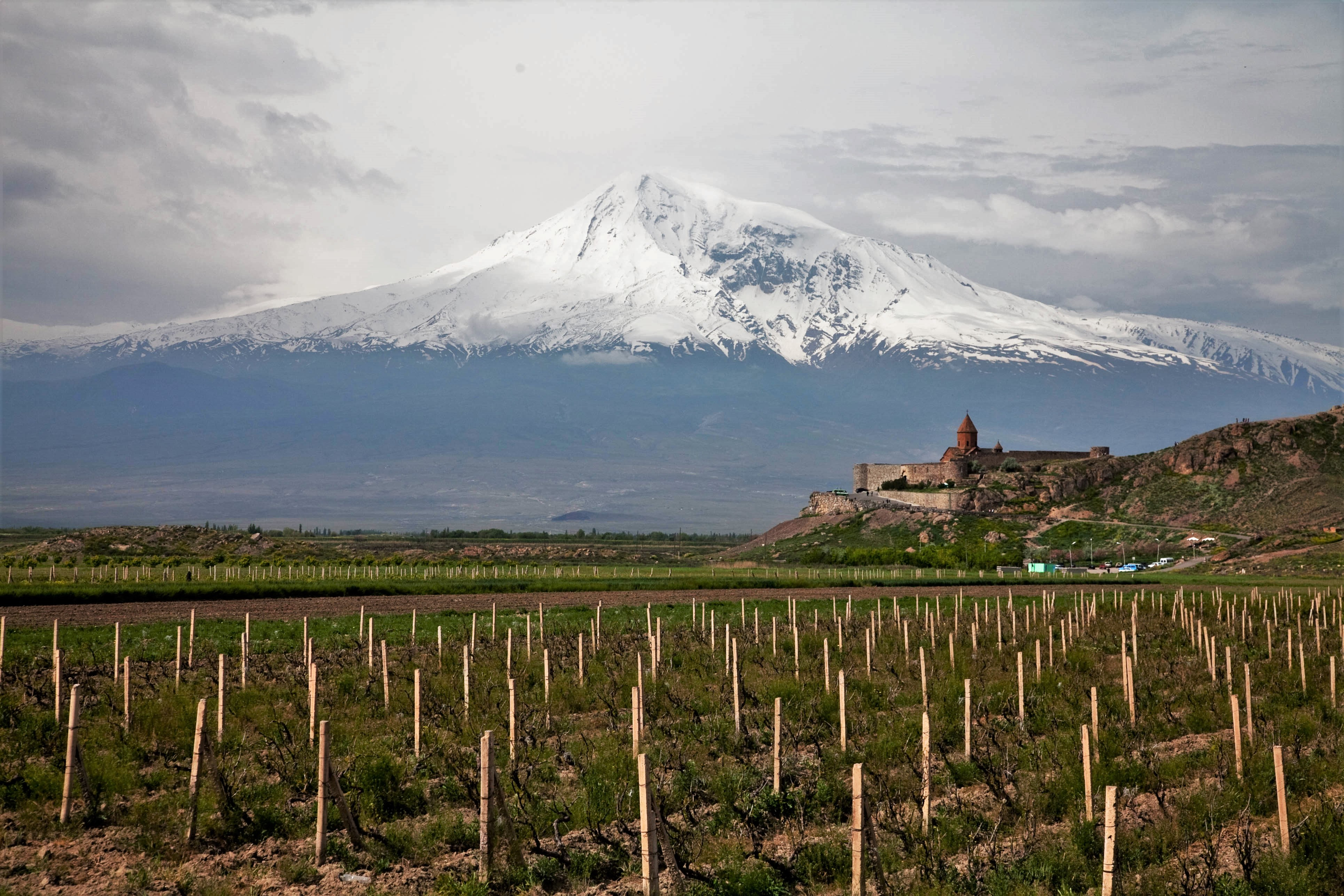
Vineyards of Artashat

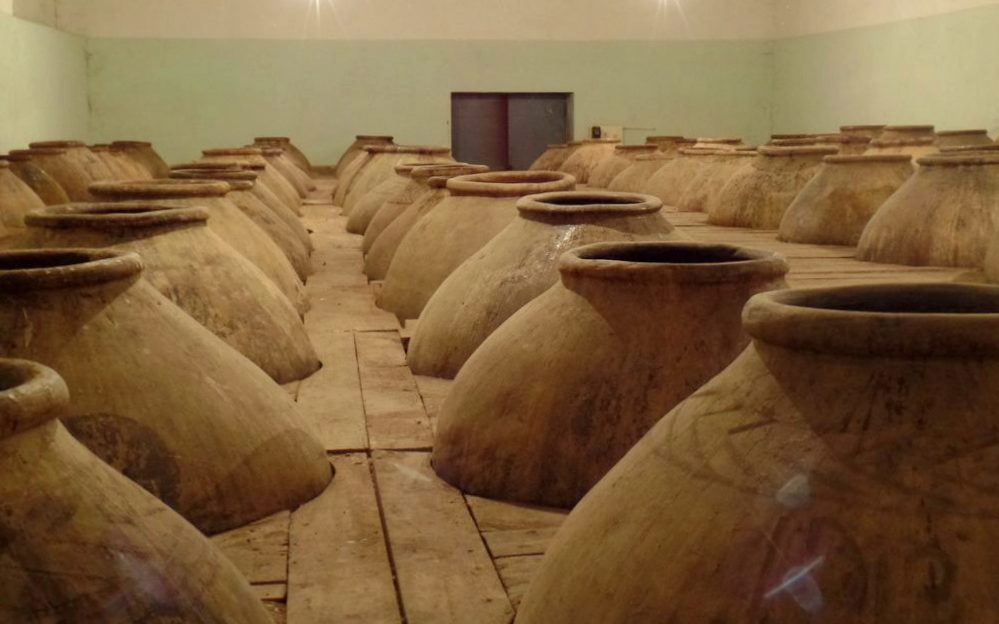
Wine cellars of Shahumyan-Vin Winery

The wine produced in Ararat is mainly from the vineyards of the Ararat plain.

- Aregak Brandy Factory, opened in 1889 in Dalar. The factory produces a variety of Armenian cognac under the brands Aregak and Arvest.
- Ararat Wine Factory, opened in 1903 in Ararat village. The factory produces a variety of cognac (Vershina Armenia, Strana Kamney, Stariy Kupazh, etc.), wine (Areni and Saperavi), fruit wine and champagne.
- Artashat Vincon Winery, opened in 1905 in Mkhchyan. Cognac is produced mainly under the brands Artashat, Argami, and Artavazd.
- Ararat Cognac Factory AKZ, opened in 1932 in Avshar. The factory produces a variety of Armenian cognac under the brands Grand Sargis, Ariné, Legend of Armenia, etc. It also produces a variety of fruit brandy and fruit wine.
- Vedi Alco Winery, opened in 1956 in Ginevet. The winery produces a variety of wine derived from the grapes of Areni, Kagor, Muscat and Saperavi, with the most notable brands being Yerevantsi, Getap Vernashen, Hayq, Khoran and Vivat Armenia. Vodka brands of Vedi include Afisha, Senator, and Leader. Cognac brands of Vedi include Duduk and Araks. The winery also produces fruit brandy, fruit vodka and fruit wine.
- Avshar Wine Factory, opened in 1968 in Avshar. The factory has a variety of Armenian cognac brands, including Avshar, Erivan, Gladzor, Ardvin, Marmara, Tigris, etc. The winner produces the Imperskaya white vodka and a variety of fruit vodka as well.
- Yeraskh Wine Factory, opened in 1970 in Yeraskh. The winery produces a variety of wine, cognac and fruit vodka.
- Van 777 Winery, opened in 1992 in Taperakan. Cognac is produced under the Arnak and Airen brands, while the wine variety is produced under the brand Tushpa.
- Agatat-Gold Winery, opened in 2007 in Nor Kyurin. The winery produces a variety of Armenian cognac with the main brands being Old Kilikia, Arseni, and Artashavan. Wine, vodka and fruit vodka are also produced under the brand Kilikia.
- Shato Arno Winery, opened in 2002 in Ayntap. The winery produces a variety of Armenian cognac including Shato Arno, Armiansky Standard and Armianskoe Zoloto. A variety of Kakheti, Kharji, Areni and Muskat wine is also produced by the winery under the brand Arzakan.
- Mrganush Brandy Factory, opened in 2002 in Mrganush. Cognac is produced under the brand Mrganush. Vodka and fruit vodka are produced under the brand Abri.
- Tavinko Winery, opened in 2006 in Taperakan. The company produces a variety of Armenian cognac under the brands Amaras, Karot, Maré, etc. A variety of wine is also produced by the winery.
- Shahumyan-Vin Winery, opened in 2006 in Shahumyan. A variety of wine, cognac and vodka is produced by the winery.
- Shaumyan Alco opened in 2007 in Artashat. The company produces a variety of Armenian cognac under the brand Grand Nariné. The winery produces a variety of fruit vodka as well.
- Sis Alco Distillery, opened in 2007 in Hayanist. Vodka and fruit vodka is produced by the distillery.
- Abrikon Distillery, opened in 2010 in Ararat village. The company produces a variety of apricot vodka and apricot brandy under the brand Abrikon.
- Proshyan Brandy Factory-Aygestan Branch, in Aygestan.

==== Armavir Province ====
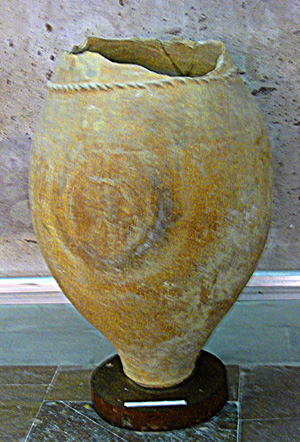
An Urartian wine pottery known as karas in Armenian, from Argishtikhinili of Armavir, dating back to the 8th century BC

The ancient city of Argishtikhinili located within the territories of Ararat province, was a major centre for wine production. Large storage areas for wine and grains were found by archaeologists within the fortifications of the ancient town dating back to the 8th century BC. The wine produced in Armavir is mainly from the vineyards of the Ararat plain.

- Echmiadzin Winery (SarKop Company) for wine, cognac and vodka, opened in 1928 in Vagharshapat.
- MAP Winery for cognac and wine, opened in 1942 in Lenughi.
- Yerevan Brandy Company-Armavir branch, opened in 1966 in Armavir.
- Merdzavan Brandy Factory for cognac, wine and vodka, opened in 1998 in Merdzavan.
- Karas Wines (Tierras de Armenia Vineyards) for wine, opened in 2003 in Arevadasht.
- Winar Winery (Brest Wine Factory) for wine, opened in 2004 in Norapat.
- Armen Alco for cognac, vodka and wine, opened in 2008 in Aygeshat.
- Voskeni Wines, opened in 2008 in Araks. The winery produces red and white wine labeled as Voskeni Wines.
- Interalco Winery, opened in 2014 in Aygeshat. The winery produces Armenian cognac under the brands Kartlos, Haos, and Japheth.
- Alluria Wines, opened in 2016 in Vagharshapat. The winery produces red and white wine labeled as Alluria.
- Proshyan Brandy Factory-Armavir village branch, for cognac, wine and vodka, in Armavir.
- Zvartnots Wine, opened in 2017 in Vagharshapat.The boutique winery produces red, white and rose wines under Z'art brand name.

==== Gegharkunik Province ====
- Samelon Vardenis Winery, opened in 2000 in Vardenis. The company produces a variety of Armenian wine and fruit vodka.

==== Kotayk Province ====
- Yeghvard Wine-Brandy Factory, opened in 1966 in Yeghvard. The company produces a variety of wine and Armenian cognac.
- Samcon Brandy Factory, opened in 1998 in Abovyan. The company has a collection of Armenian cognac under the brands Ti Aspetto, Karin, and Shushi.
- Byuregh Alco Winery, opened in 1996 in Byureghavan. The winery produces a variety of vodka under the brands Champion, Byuregh, Marshal, etc. The company also produces a variety of Armenian cognac under the brands Harutyun, and Ishkhan. Wine is also produced under the brands Znaberd, Arshaluys, Karmir, etc.
- Ptghni Gold Winery, opened in 1996 in Ptghni. The company produces a variety of wine and liquor.
- Glanzh Alco Winery, opened in 2003 in Aramus. The winery produces a variety of Armenian cognac under the brands Glanzh, Manazkert, and Arse. It also produces a variety of Kagor, Areni, Muskat, Saperavi and Voskehat wine as well as pomegranate wine.
- Rukar Group for vodka and calvados, opened in 2010 in Verin Ptghni. The company produces fruit vodka under the brands Tet-A-tet, Shivini, and Dlya Druzey. It also produces Calvados under the brand Carvani.
- Shahnazaryan Wine-Brandy House, opened in 2011 in Yeghvard. The winery produces a variety of cognac under the brands Armyanski Cognac, Gayaso, Zhemchuzhina Armeniy, Shanazaryan, etc. It also produces vodka and wine.
- Helias Vineyards, opened in 2013 in Dzoraghbyur. The winery produces the Helias Roubin red dry wine, the Helias Pearl white dry wine, and the Helias Reserve red dry wine.

==== Shirak Province ====
- Shirak Wine, opened in 2009 in Shirakavan. The factory produces a variety of wine under the brand Kumayri.

==== Syunik Province ====
- Freedom Distillery, opened in 2014 in Norashenik. The factory produces a variety of fruit vodka under the brand Kashuni.

==== Tavush Province ====
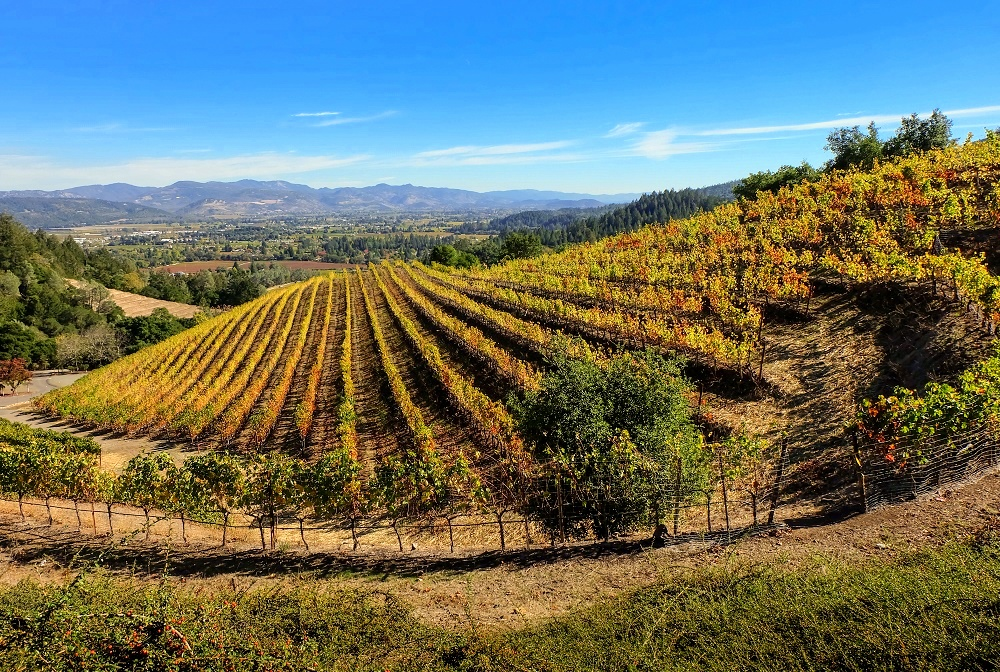
Ijevan vineyards

The wine produced in Tavush is mainly from the vineyards of the Aghstev river valley. Modern viticulture in the Tavush region has been developed since the 1950s. However, the Ijevan winery is particularly famous for its pomegranate wine.

- Berdavan Wine Factory, opened in 1946 in Berdavan. The factory produces a variety of wine, fruit wine and fruit vodka.
- Ijevan Wine-Brandy Factory, opened in 1951 in Ijevan. The factory produces a large number of well-known wine brands including Sargon, Ijevan, and Khachkar. The factory also produces a variety of Armenian cognac including King Abgar, Nemrut, Arqa, Vanuhi and Old Ijevan.

==== Vayots Dzor Province ====
Vayots Dzor is one of the ancient regions that produce wine in the Caucasus. The wine produced from the Vayots Dzor vineyards – particularly from the region of Areni – is known as Areni wine. Vayots Dzor is home to the annual Areni wine festival launched in 2009.

- Getap Wine Factory-Vedi Alco Winery branch, opened in 1938 in Getap. Getap winery is operated as a branch of the Vedi Alco Winery.
- Areni Wine Factory, opened in 1994 in Areni. A variety of red Areni is produced by the winery under the brands Vayots Dzor, Lernashen, and St. Etchmiadzin.

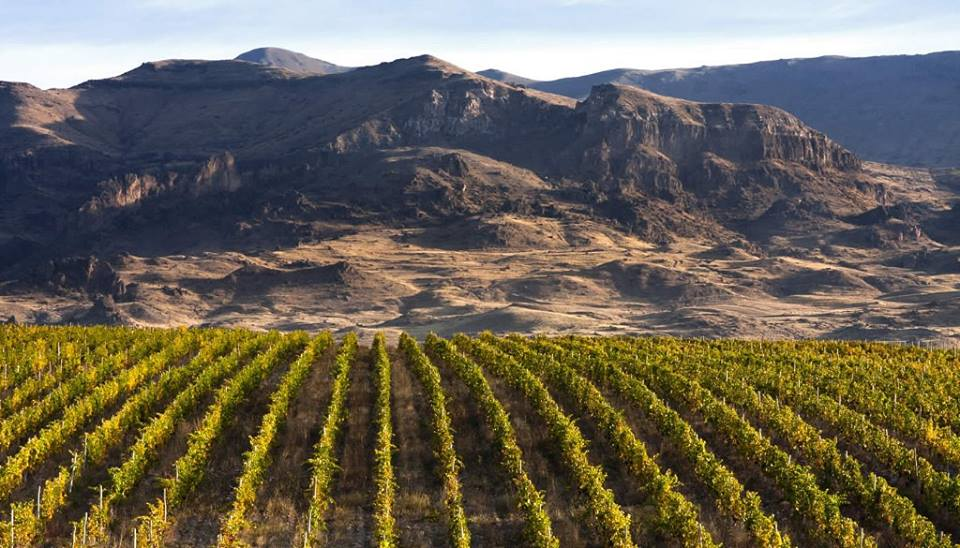
Zorah Wines vineyards

- Old Bridge Winery, opened in 1998 in Yeghegnadzor. The company produces a variety of red Areni and white Voskehat wine under the brand Old Bridge.
- Getnatoun Winery, opened in 1999 in Yeghegnadzor. The winery produces a variety of wine under the brands Getnatoun, Vernasehn, Nariné, and Elen.
- Vayk Winery, opened in 2000 in Vayk. The winery produces wine under the brands Kars Reserve, Zakaré, pomegranate wines.
- Matevosyan Wine, opened in 2001 in Aghavnadzor. The winery produces the Matevosyan Wine of Areni grapes, as well as the Matevosyan Pomegranate Wine.
- Zorah Wines, opened in 2001 in Rind. The winery produces Areni wine under the brands Karasi, Voski, and Yereaz. The company's 2010 Zorah Karasi Areni Noir was ranked in the 2012 Bloomberg's top 10 list.
- Areni Wine Winery, opened in 2003 in Areni. The winery produces red Areni under the brands Areni Wine and Areni Country, as well as white Areni under the brand Sun Areni.

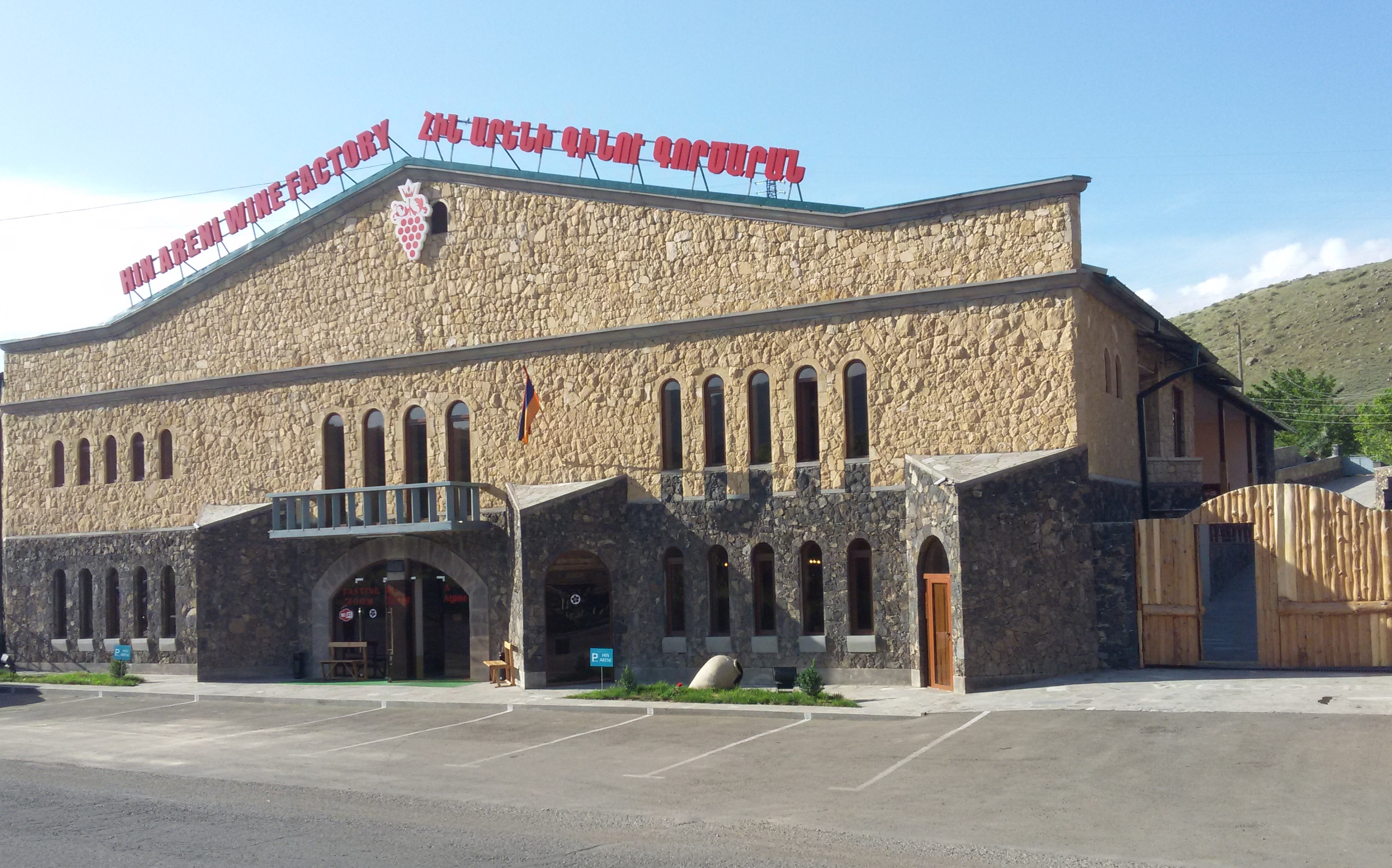
Hin Areni Winery

- Areni Vineyards, opened in 2007 in Areni. The winery produces a variety of red Areni and white Voskehat wine under the brand Hin Areni.Their brands are Trinity Eh, 6100, Ancestors' and Crossroads. The Trinity Ancestors is a natural red and amber wine.

==== Yerevan ====
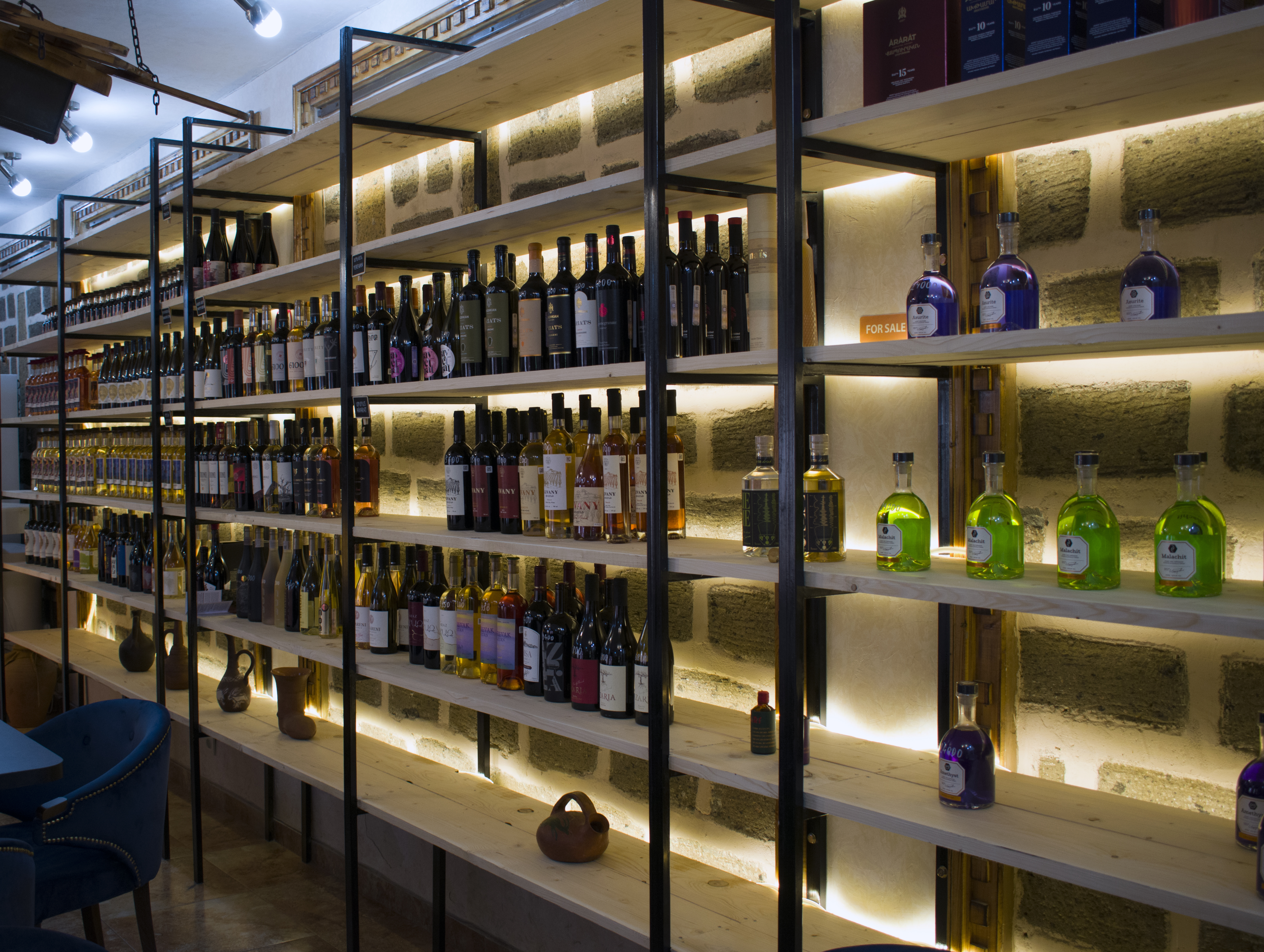
Armenian wines

Archaeological excavations carried out by Pyatrovski in the 19th and 20th centuries have confirmed that in the area of modern-day Yerevan was a wine making and producing region as early as the 9th century BC. In the Urartian fortress of Teishebaini near Yerevan, archaeologists found a wine storehouse with 480 karases (wine potteries), which hold 37,000 daL of wine. During excavations in the most ancient settlements of Erebuni/Yerevan, including the Karmir Blur site and the Erebuni Fortress of 782 BC, archaeologists found 10 wine storehouses in which more than 200 karases were kept.

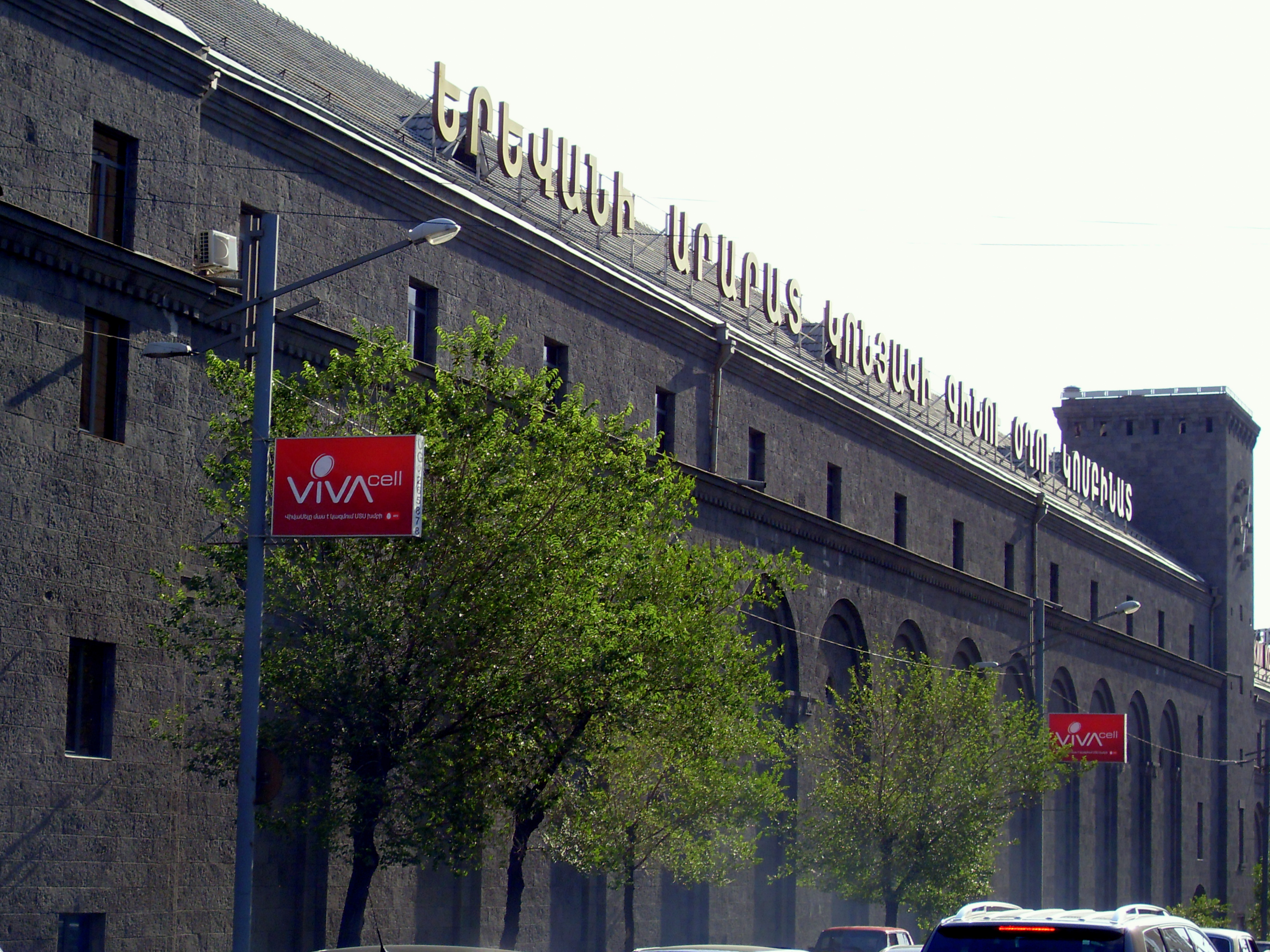
Yerevan Ararat Brandy

- Yerevan Ararat Brandy Factory, opened in 1877 in Yerevan. The factory produces the famous brands of Noy and Kremlin Award.

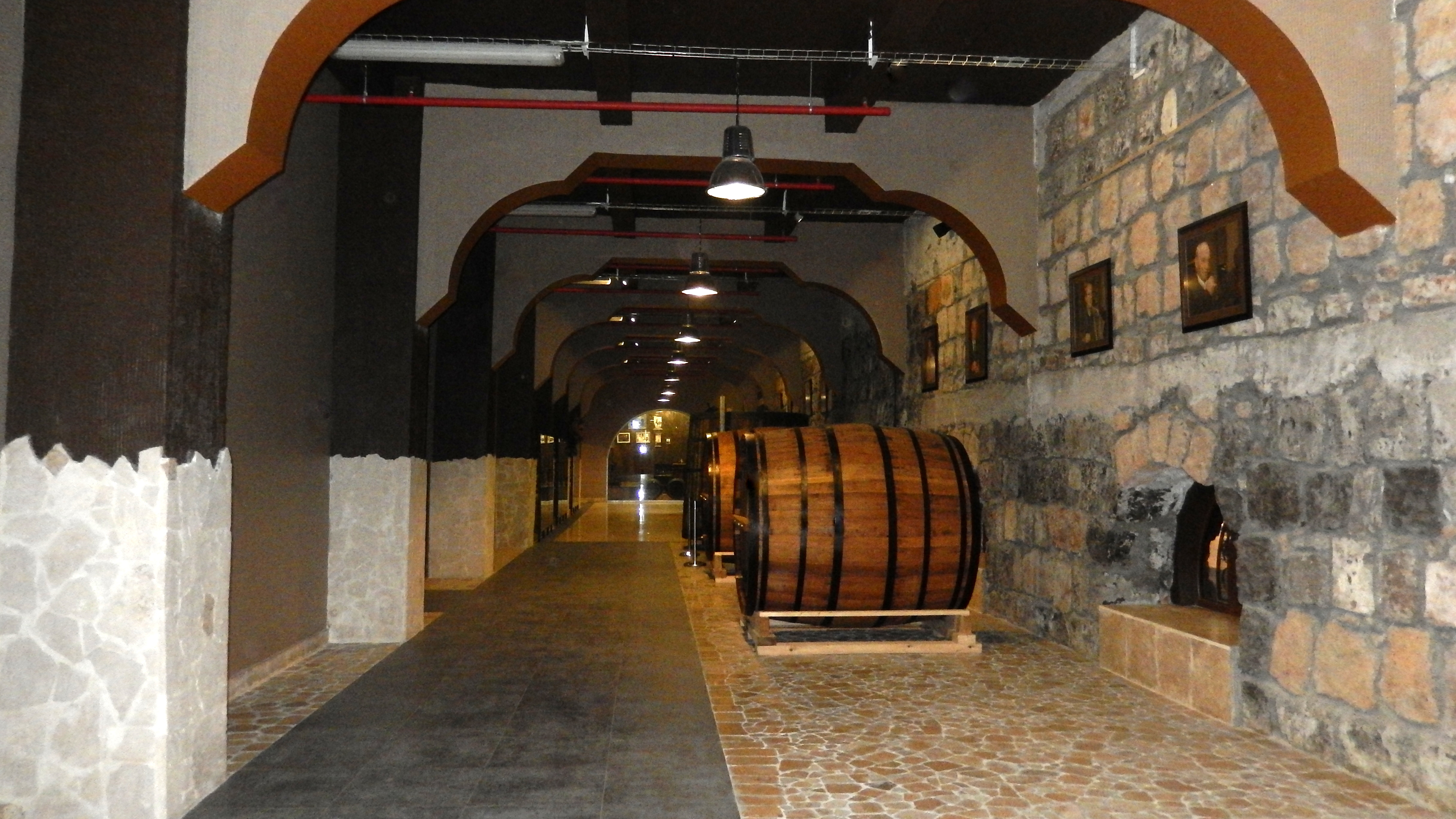
The cognac cellars of the Yerevan Brandy Company

- Yerevan Brandy Company, opened in 1887 in Yerevan. The company produces a series of Armenian cognac known as ArArAt, including Erebuni, Nairi, Tonakan, Vaspurakan, etc.
- Yerevan Champagne, opened in 1939 in Yerevan. The factory produces a large variety of wine, fruit wine, cognac, vodka and champagne. Main wine brands include Hayk Nahapet, Renaissance, Anna, and Lilit. Armenian cognac is produced under the brands Pride of Armenia, Voske Dar, Frans, Naré, and Trdat. Vodka brands include Mujik and Russkaya Nakhodka. Semi dry, red sparkling, dry and semisweet champagne are all produced by the factory under the brand Armenian Champagne.
- Armco Wine-Brandy Factory, opened in 1972 in Yerevan. The factory produces the cognac brands of Mother Armenia, Evening Yerevan, and the Armco Brandy.
- Proshyan Brandy Factory, opened in 1980 in Yerevan. It produces a large variety of cognac, champagne, wine and vodka. The company's most famous brand is the Mané brandy. Other famous cognac brands include Khent, Charents, Vardan Mamikonyan, King Pap, Queen Tamara, etc. The company also produces the Spitak Yerevan champagne, Partez and Proshyan wine, the vodka brands of Generalskaya, Kalina Krasnaya, Russa, and Alaska, along with the Hookup vodka cocktail.
- Maran Winery, opened in 1992 in Yerevan. A variety of wine is produced under the brands St. Anna, Zarm, Noravank, Bagratuni, and Arpa. Areni wine is produced under the brands Areni Maran, Areni Malishka and Areni Yeghegnadzor, while Pinot wine is produced as Avagini Rouge and Avagini Blanc. Pomegranate wine is produced as M. Parajanov, while apricot wine is branded as Maran Apricot. The winery also produces a variety of fruit vodka labeled as Bark. The company's Bagratuni red dry wine received a bronze medal in the 2014 Decanter World Wine Awards.
- Arabkir Alco, opened in 2003 in Yerevan. The distillery is the producer of Barov vodka, as well as fruit vodka under the brands Arabkir and Hin Arabkir.
- Gevorkian Winery, opened in 2006 in Yerevan. It is the producer of 365 Wines, Mi Tas Wine and Ariats Wine.
- Alex Grig Alcohol Plant, opened in 2007. The distillery produces a variety of vodka and ouzo. It also produces whiskey since 2014, under the brands Mac Alex and Mac Grant.
- Astafian Wine-Brandy Factory, opened in 2008 in Yerevan. The factory is the producer of the cognac brands Astafian, Aregi, and Hatis. The company also produces wine under the brands Villa Wine, Amor, and Artuyt. Vodka is also produced by the company under the brands Molière, Beli Gorod, and Molka.
- Jerandevu Winery, opened in 2014. The winery is the producer of Qotot Wines.
- Highland Cellars, opened in 2014. The company is the producer of Koor Wines.
- Arssi Alliance, opened in 2015 in Yerevan. The distillery is the producer of H_{2}O, Godfather, and No Problem vodka brands.
- Kensatu Distillary, opened in 2017 in Yerevan. The distillery is the producer of the Kensatu vodka and fruit vodka brand.
- Beroia Distillary, opened in 2017 in Yerevan. The distillery is the producer of the Beroia arak and vodka brand.
- Yerevan has also attracted foreign investment with the indo-Armenian Yog Wines being opened in the year 2022.

==== Republic of Artsakh ====
Artsakh is the 10th province of the historic Kingdom of Armenia. The region is known for wine-making since ancient times, especially the southern part where the Artsakh vineyards are mainly found. It is home to the Sireni grape variety. The climate of the region combined with its fertile soil allows to produce a unique variety of grapes, at an average height of 800 meters above sea level. Many wine karases (jugs) dating back to the 7th century, were found in the archaeological sites near the village of Togh.

- Stepanakert Brandy Factory, operating since 1931 in Stepanakert with branches in Yerevan, Martuni and Karmir Shuka. The company produces a variety of cognac under the brand Madatoff, wine under the brand Berdashen, and fruit vodka under the brand Karabakh.
- Artsakh Brandy Company, opened in 1998 in Aygestan village of Askeran Region. The factory produces a variety of cognac under the brand Artsakh Ohanyan, fruit brandy under the brand Artsakh, wine under the brand Artsakh Shushi, and vodka under the brand Ohanyan.
- Kataro Winery of Anush-1 Company, opened in 2010 in Togh village of Hadrut Region. The winery produces a variety of Sireni wine from the vineyards of Artsakh, under the brand Kataro.
- Mika-Hadrut Winery, in Hadrut, Hadrut Region, produces a variety of cognac, wine and vodka under the brand Mika.
- Askeran Wine, in Askeran, Askeran Region, for wine and vodka.
- Aragil Winery, in Shekher, Martuni Region, produces APRIS Wines. The winery produces a variety of Sireni and Gratiesti wines from the vineyards of Artsakh.
- Balasanyan Winery, in Askeran, Askeran Region, produces the Tat U Pap wine and vodka.
- Lia Cooperative, in Martakert, Martakert Region, produces the Martakert wine.
- Hayrapetyan Brothers Winery, in Karmir Shuka village of Martuni Region, produces a variety of wine.
- Piank Winery, in Khramort, Askeran Region, produces the Vanqasar wine.
- Tnjri-2000" Cooperative, in Martuni, Martuni Region, produces a variety of wine.

==== Armenian Wine Distribution in Europe ====
- Armenian Wines Online Shop
- Armenian Wines – Heres Wine – World's oldest wines by Sona Shaboyan – Online Shop

==== Armenian Wine Distribution in The United States ====
- Storica, founded in 2020, imports and distributes exclusively Armenian wine in the US. Notable among its offerings is a rosé produced from the Areni grape.

== See also ==
- Agriculture in Armenia
- Beer in Armenia
- Armenian cuisine
