= Proshyan Brandy Factory =

Alcohol factory in Armenia

Coordinates: 40°13′38″N 44°26′46″E

- Industry: Drinks
- Founded: 1885
- Headquarters: Yerevan, Armenia
- Products: Alcoholic beverages
- Owner: Armen Gasparyan, Eduard Chobanyan
- Website: proshyan.am

Proshyan Brandy Factory (Armenian: Պռոշյանի կոնյակի գործարան), is one of the oldest producers of alcoholic drinks in Armenia, located in Yerevan, on the Ashtarak Highway leading to the village of Proshyan. The factory is mainly famous for its brandy brand 'Mané'.

== History ==
Originally, the Proshyan Brandy Factory has been in operation in the village of Proshyan since 1885. However, the current production facilities were opened in 1980 as a state-owned enterprise by the government of the Armenian SSR, at the northwestern outskirts of Yerevan. After the collapse of the Soviet Union, the factory was privatized in 1996.

Armenian brandy is the main product of the factory which is derived from the grapes of the fertile Ararat plain. However, the factory has also a variety of other products including, wine, fruit wine, liqueur, vodka, and canned food. The company also produces a large collection of souvenir brandy. The production is entirely based on Italian technology.

The products of the factory are constantly exported to Russia, Ukraine, Latvia, Belarus, Lithuania, Georgia, Germany, Estonia, United States, Greece, Poland, Israel, South Korea, Kazakhstan and Tajikistan.

In addition to its main factory in Yerevan, the company also operates the Proshyan-Aygestan winery in the Aygestan village of Ararat Province and the Proshyan-Armavir winery in the Armavir village of Armavir Province. However, the entire bottling process takes place in the main factory in Yerevan.

== Products and brands ==
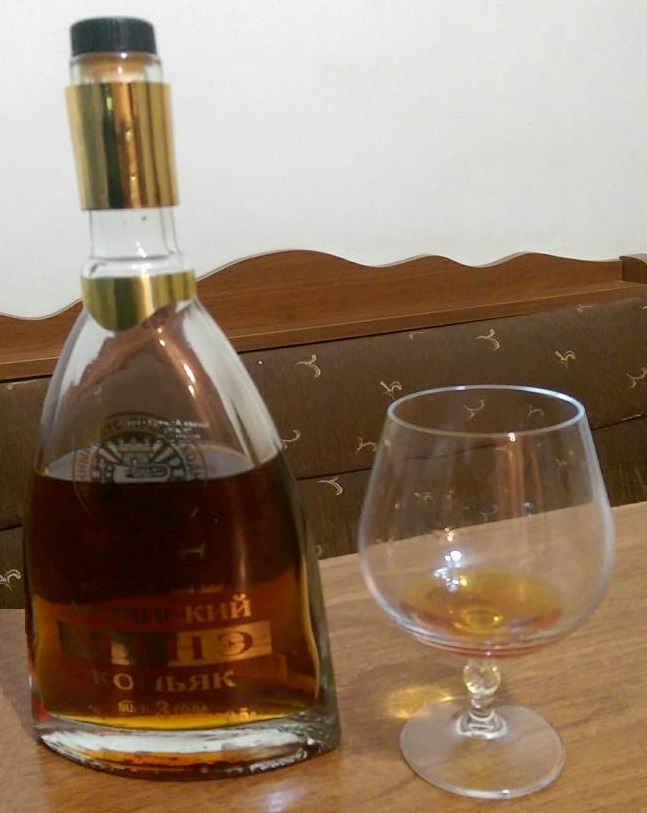
Mané 3 years old Armenian cognac from Proshyan factory

The factory is mainly famous for its large variety of Armenia Cognac production. Brands of Proshyan winery include:

- Mané, 3, 5, 8 and 30 years old premium cognac.
- Khent With Cigar, 10, 20 and 30 years old extra class cognac.
- Charents, 10, 20 and 30 years old extra class cognac.
- Vardan Mamikonyan, 3, 5, 8 and 20 years old premium cognac.
- Khent, 10, 20 and 30 years old premium cognac.
- King Pap, 20, 25 and 30 years old premium cognac.
- Proshyan, 3, 5, 8 and 20 years old premium cognac.
- Ameli, 15 years old premium cognac.
- Armenian Opera, special blend premium cognac.
- Marshal Murat, 3, 5, 8 and 10 years old cognac.
- H. Shiraz, 3, 5 and 8 years old cognac.
- Musinyan, 3, 5 and 8 years old cognac.
- Sheram, 3, 5 and 8 years old cognac.
- Artsruni, 3, 5 and 8 years old cognac.
- Hr. Kochar, 8 years old cognac.
- Armenian Castle, 3 and 5 years old cognac.
- Haykuhi, 3, 5, 8 and 15 years old cognac.
- Ara Jan, 3 and 5 years old cognac.
- Artamat, 5 years old cognac.
- Congratulatory, 5 years old cognac.
- Tsarevna Anna, 8 years old cognac.
- Queen Tamara, 8 and 10 years old cognac blended almond flavour.
- Armenuhi, soft blended 10 years old cognac with plum-chocolate taste.
- V. Teryan, 3, 5 and 8 years old cognac blended with vanilla and chocolate.
- Three Stars, grape cognac blended with vanilla-chocolate and velvet taste.
- Five Stars, grape cognac blended with vanilla.
