= Stability Party =

Stability Party Կայունության կուսակցություն
- Leader: Firdus Zakaryan
- Founded: 2021
- Headquarters: Yerevan
- Ideology: Socialism; Progressivism
- Political position: Centre-left
- Slogan: "Stability, work and progress"

The Stability Party (Armenian: Կայունության կուսակցություն, romanized: Kayunut’yan kusakts’ut’yun) is an Armenian political party. It was founded in 2021 and is currently led by Firdus Zakaryan.

== History ==
The Stability Party held its founding congress in Yerevan on 3 April 2021 and Firdus Zakaryan was elected as party Chairman. Zakaryan was the former chief of staff of the Ministry of Diaspora and a former member of the Republican Party of Armenia.

In December 2021, Zakaryan ran for mayor in the town of Avshar.

The party currently does not maintain any representation within the National Assembly and acts as an extra-parliamentary force.

== Ideology ==
Members of the party emphasize the need for progressive solutions to the social problems of the people, supports the creation of a welfare state, and admire Soviet style socialism.

== See also ==
- Programs of political parties in Armenia
