= MAP Wine and Brandy Factory =

Alcoholic Drinks Factory in Armenia

Coordinates: 40°07′46″N 43°58′12″E

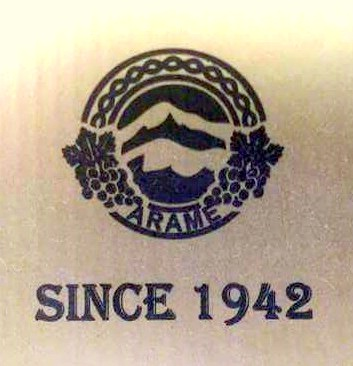
- Company type: Closed Joint-Stock Company
- Industry: Drinks
- Founded: 1942
- Headquarters: Lenughi, Armavir Province, Armenia
- Key people: Makar Petrosyan (General director)
- Products: Alcoholic beverages
- Owner: Alik Petrosyan (Major shareholder)
- Website: map.am

MAP Wine and Brandy Factory (Armenian: ՄԱՊ Գինու-Կոնյակի Գործարան (MAP Ginu-Konyaki Gortsaran)), is one of the leading producers of alcoholic drinks in Armenia, located in the village of Lenughi of Armavir Province. It was founded in 1942 as the Hoktemberian Wine and Brandy Factory by the government of the Armenian SSR, to process the grapes of the fertile Ararat plain. The company is largely known by its main wine and cognac brand Aramé, named after king Arame of Urartu.

== History ==
The Hoktemberian Wine and Brandy Factory was founded in 1942 as a state-owned enterprise of the Soviet Armenian government.

After the privatization of the factory in 1995, the winery was turned into an open joint-stock company. In 2001, the company was incorporated into a closed joint-stock company.

As of 2016, the factory has an annual production capacity 14 million liters, based on French and German technologies.

== Products and brands ==
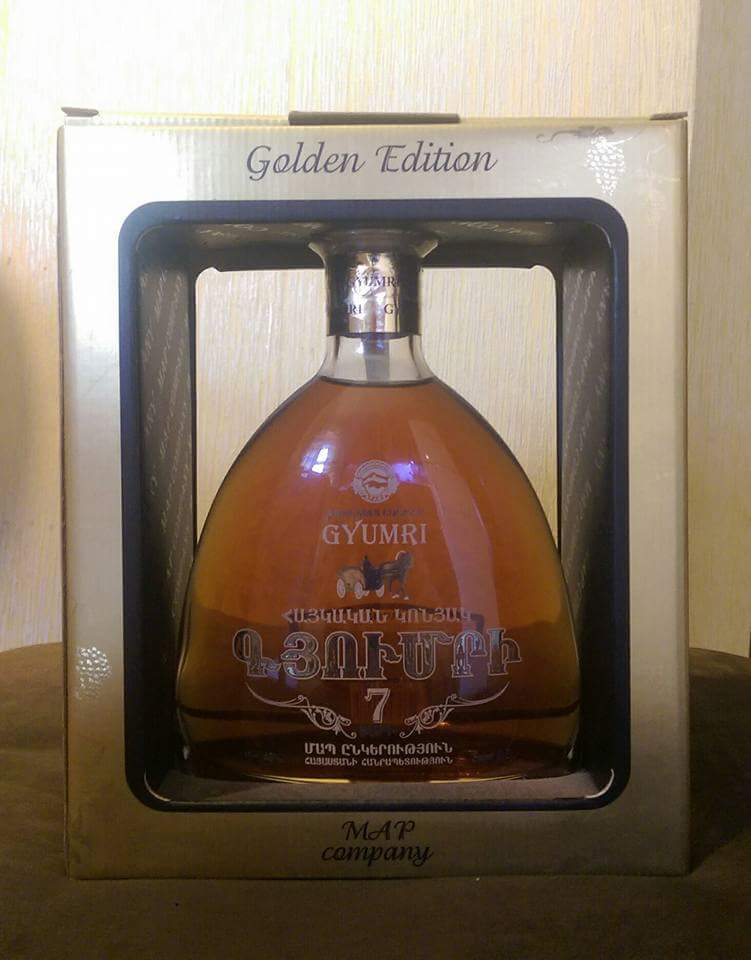
Gyumri, 7 years old premium cognac

Currently, the factory produces wine, fruit wine and Armenian brandy.

A variety of red and white wine is produced by the MAP winery, mainly under the brand Aramé. The Aramé brand includes red and white semisweet vintage wine as well as wine derived from the Muscat, Saperavi and Areni grapes. The Aramé Grand Reserve is a special edition of red and white dry aged wine. The winery also produces Tigran red dry wine, and Hasmik red semisweet wine.

Fruit semisweet wine is also produced by MAP winery including, pomegranate, strawberry, cherry, quince, plum, dogwood, raspberry and blackberry.

MAP is famous for its Armenian brandy collection of Saint Grigor 30 and 50 years old, Paruyr Sevak 40 years old, Makar 25 and 30 years old, Aramé 20 and 30 years old, Golden 25 years old, Ashot Erkat 22 years old, and Mashtots 15 years old. Other cognac brands include Golden Classic 3, 5, 7 and 10 years old, Anahit 10 years old, Gyumri and Arshak II 7 years old, Aramé 3 and 5 years old, Armavir 5 years old, and Armina 3, 5, 7, 10, 15 and 20 years old.

== Gallery ==
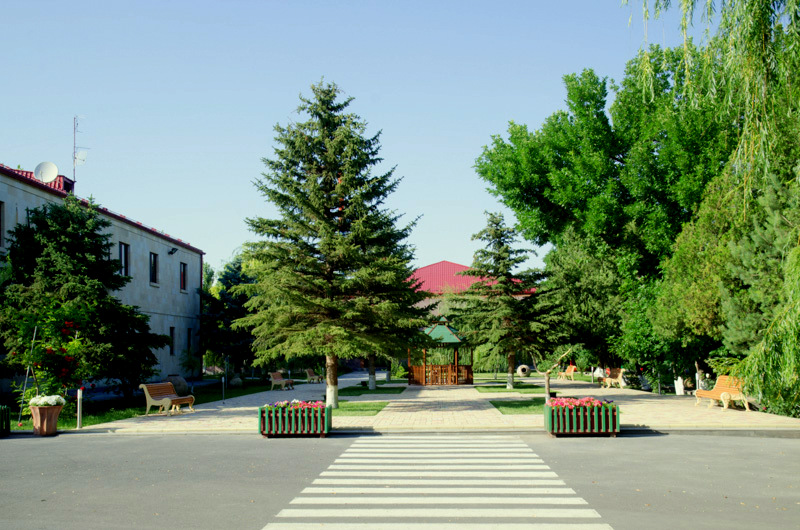
MAP factory

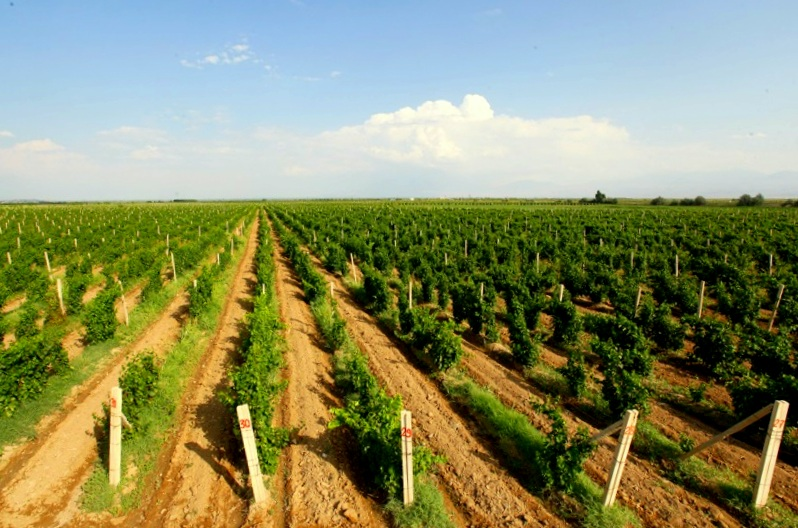
MAP vineyards in Armavir

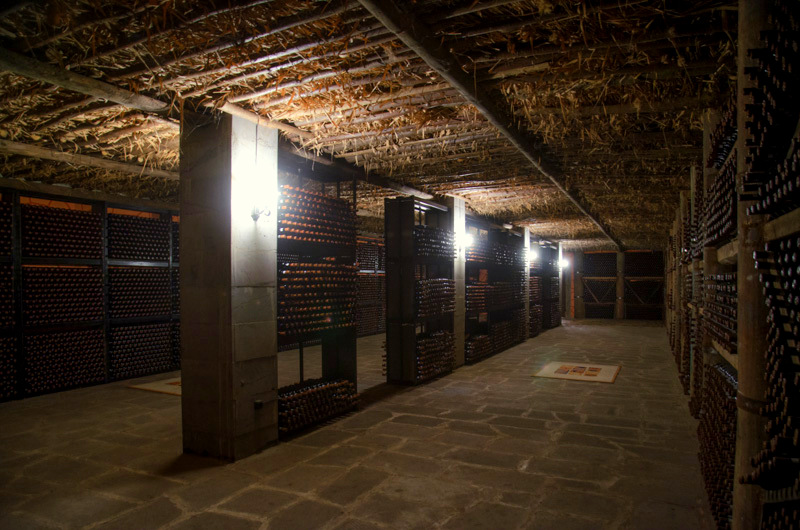
Cellars at the MAP winery

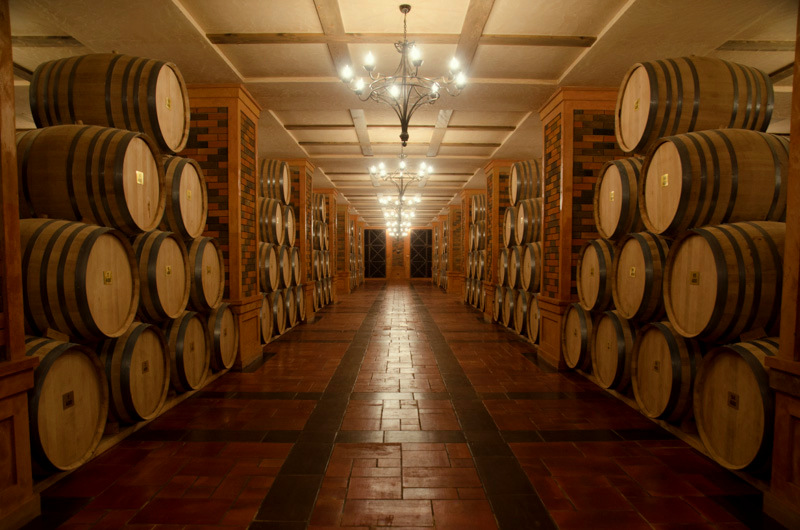
Wine cellars
