= Rafael Yeranosyan =

- Born: 25 July 1981 (age 44); Lenughi, Armavir Region, Armenia SSR
- Genres: Humour
- Years active: 2006–present

Rafael Hamleti Yeranosyan (Armenian: Ռաֆայել Համլետի Երանոսյան; July 25, 1981, Lenughi, Armavir Region, Armenian SSR), is an Armenian actor, film actor, comedian, showman. He performs mainly in the humorous genre.

== Biography ==
Rafael Yeranosyan was born on July 25, 1981, in the village of Lenughi in the Hoktemberyan region of Armenian SSR. In 1988–1998 he studied at the secondary school after Jivani in the village of Lenughi, Armavir region. Rafael Yeranosyan has been striving for art and stage since childhood. After graduating from school, the future actor entered the acting studio "Armenfilm" film studio (also known as "Hayfilm"), which he graduated in 2006. After graduating from the acting studio, he started working at the Yerevan State Chamber Theater as an actor, where he still participates in various performances.

== Creative activity ==
As a member of Yerevan State Chamber Theater, Rafael participated in the following republican and international theater festivals: "Cabaret" show-performance (2007), Cultural Days of the Republic of Armenia in the Republic of Belarus (2007), "At Arms" performance (Tehran, Iran, 2008), "Theaters of the World" festival, in the framework of which he performed "Government Concert" and "Call to Arms" (Los Angeles, US, 2009), "Duet" International Theater Festival with the performance "Scotch & Whiskey" (Gyumri, Armenia, 2012), 8th Republican Festival of Young Theatrical Directing with the performance "Scotch & Whiskey" (Yerevan, Armenia, 2013), theatrical festival dedicated to the 53rd anniversary of the city Abovyan with the melodrama "Amnesia" (Abovyan, Armenia, 2015), "Vivat" comedy (Saint Petersburg, Russia, 2015), "Days of Yerevan in Vanadzor" with the performance "Show N3" (Yerevan, Armenia, 2019). Rafael Yeranosyan also acted in the following performances: "OK" social comedy (director Vahag Grigoryan), "No Comment", "7 and a half". Now he acts in the performances "Glamorous Shepherds" (directed by Karo Balyan), "Don Juans in Marseille" (directed by Narek Duryan). The actor also starred in the following movies and TV shows: "Priestess" (2007), "Alabalanitsa" (2011), "Super Mama" (2014), "Poker.am" (2012), "32 Teeth", "Stone grief". In 2014, he played the main character Mika in Arshaluys Harutyunyan's "Scotch & Whiskey" feature film comedy, in 2015 he filmed in Ara Yernjakyan's full-length feature film "Zhanna".

== Awards ==
- Letter of thanks given by the RA Ministry of Culture – September 20, 2011
- "Grigor Narekatsi" Memorial Medal of the RA Ministry of Culture – March 27, 2015
