= Vedi Alco Winery =

Producer of alcoholic drinks in Armenia

Coordinates: 39°55′54″N 44°37′20″E

Vedi Alco
- Type: Closed Joint-Stock Company
- Industry: Drinks
- Founded: 1956
- Headquarters: Ginevet, Ararat Province, Armenia
- Key people: Asatur Gevorgyan (General manager)
- Products: Alcoholic beverages
- Owner: Manvel Ghazaryan (Major shareholder)
- Website: vedi-alco.am

Vedi Alco (Vedi Aro, is one of the leading producers of alcoholic drinks in Armenia, located in the village of Ginevet of Ararat Province. It was founded in 1956 as the Vedi Wine Factory by the government of the Armenian SSR, named after the Vedi raion of Soviet Armenia. The grapes processed by Vedi Alco are mainly from the Ararat plain as well as the Areni and Getap region of Vayots Dzor.

== History ==
The construction of the Vedi Wine Factory was launched in 1952 and completed in 1956 as a state-owned enterprise. With the establishment of the factory, 2 villages around the winery have been quickly developed. First, the settlement located to the south of the winery was formed and named Nor Ughi (meaning new way in Armenian), and later another settlement was developed around the factory itself which became known as "Vedu ginu gortsaranin kits" (translates as Vedi wine factory settlement). However, the factory settlement was eventually incorporated into a separate village and renamed Ginevet under the independent government of Armenia, during the 2000s.

After the collapse of the Soviet Union, the Vedi Wine Factory was privatized in 1994 to become a closed joint-stock company.

The products of the factory are constantly exported to Russia, United States, Ukraine, Latvia, Estonia, France, Lithuania, etc.

The Getap Wine Factory operating since 1938 in the village of Getap in Vayots Dzor is also owned by the "Vedi Alco" CJSC since its privatization in 1994.

== Products and brands ==
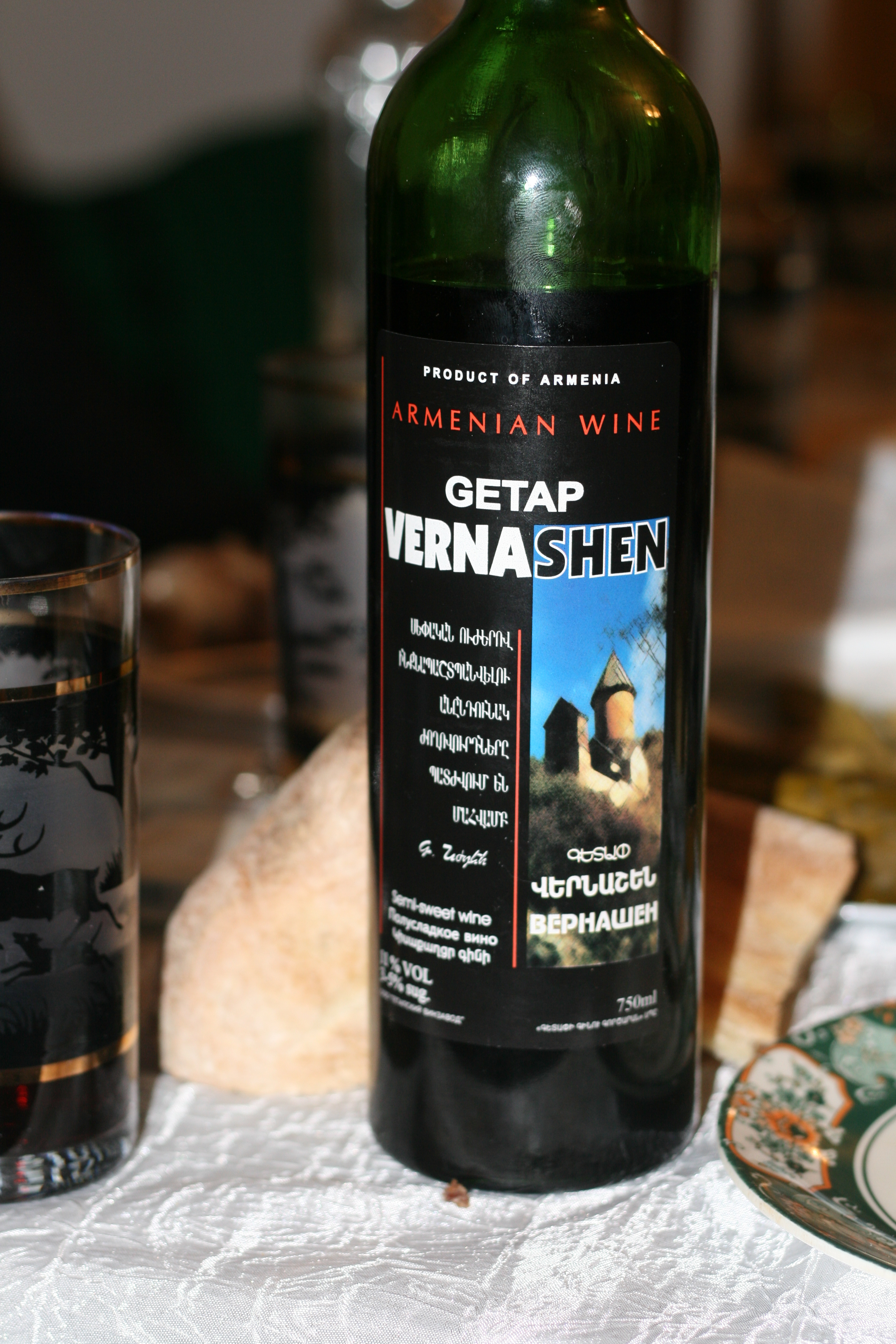
Getap Vernashen, red semisweet wine from Vedi Alco, made of the Areni Noir grapes

Currently, the factory produces wine, cognac (brandy) and vodka.

The winery produces a variety of red and white, dry semisweet and dessert wines. Notable wine brands of Vedi Alco include the Yerevantsi, Getap Vernashen, Areni Gold, Anush, Hayq, Khoran, Vivat Armenia and Kharji. The winery also produces many types of wine derived from the grapes of Areni, Kagor, Muscat and Saperavi. The winery also produces fruit wine, derived from blackberry, raspberry, cherry, peach and pomegranate.

Vodka brands of Vedi include the Afisha, Leader, Stolik, Senator, Novinka, and Bochka. The winery also produces fruit vodka, derived from grape, apricot, cornelian cherry, mulberry, forest pear and cherry.

Cognac brands of Vedi include Duduk (7 and 10 years old), Araks (10 years old) and Vivat Armenia (3, 5, 7 and 10 years old). The winery also produces Muscat and apricot cognac.
