= Avshar Wine Factory =

Armenian alcohol producer

Coordinates: 39°51′48″N 44°40′10″E

- Company type: Limited Liabaility Company
- Industry: Drinks
- Founded: 1968
- Headquarters: Avshar, Armenia
- Key people: Samvel Tadevosyan (Executive director)
- Products: Alcoholic beverages
- Owner: Arayik Grigoryan
- Website: www.avshar-wine.am

Avshar Wine Factory (Armenian: Ավշարի Գինու Գործարան (Avshari Ginu Gortsaran)), is one of the leading producers of alcoholic drinks in Armenia, located in the village of Avshar of Ararat Province. It was founded in 1968 to process the grapes of the fertile villages of Ararat plain, one of Armenia's leading agricultural areas. Armenian traditions and folklore suggest that wine production in the region dates back to Noah planting grapes upon his descent from Mount Ararat in the Book of Genesis.

== History ==
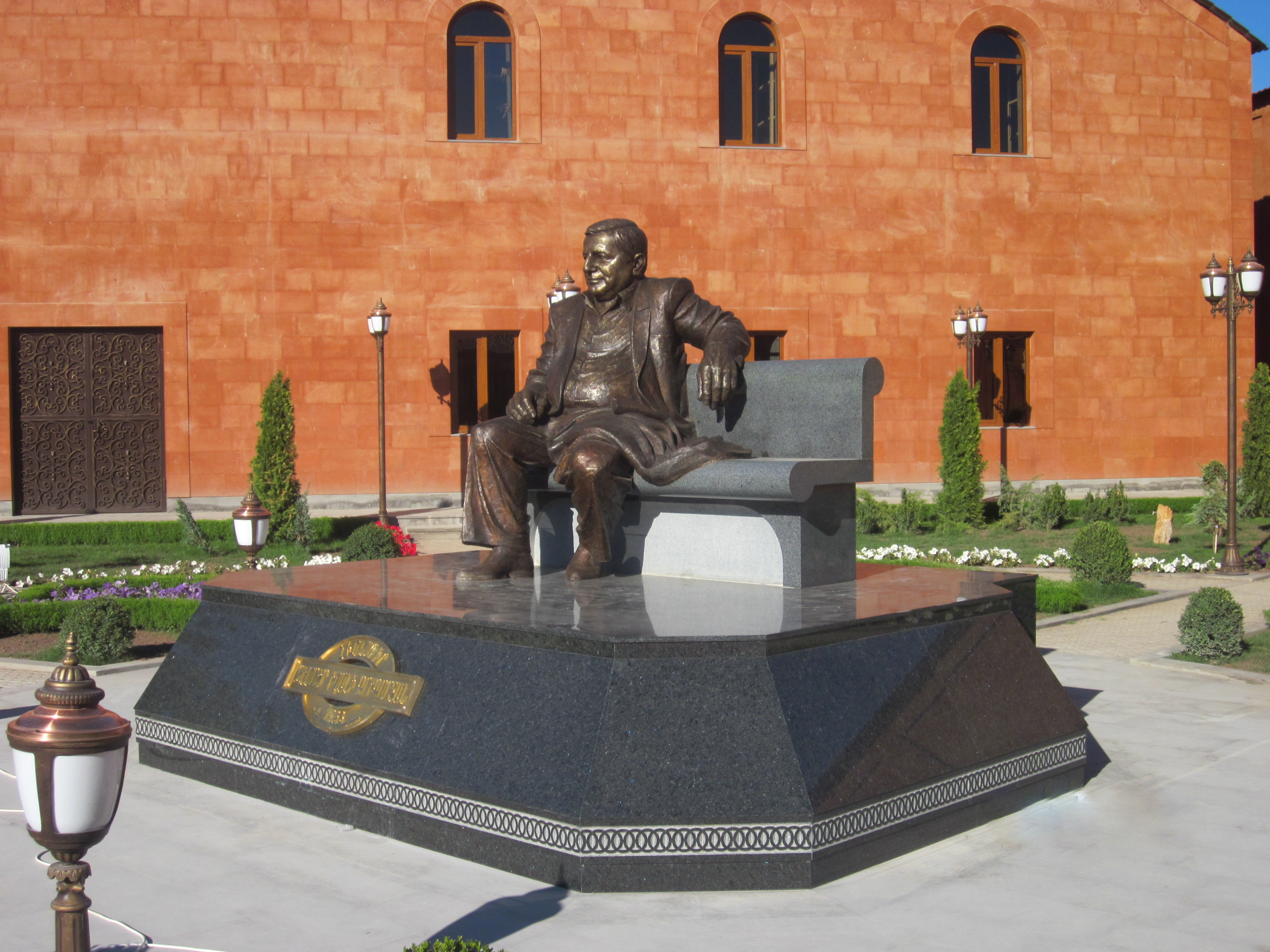
The statue of the factory founder Temur Grigoryan at the entrance to the Avshar winery

The construction of the factory was launched in 1965 and completed in 1968, through the efforts of Temur Grigoryan. It was operated as a state enterprise wine production unit of the Armenian SSR. At the beginning, the winery was able to process about 500-600 tons of grapes to produce sweet wine. However, the capacity of the Avshar winery was expanded rapidly through Grigoryan's efforts, to reach up to 1,000 tons by the end of 1970.

The processing capacity of the factory was expanded gradually to become 2,000 tones in 1975, and 3,000 tones in 1985. The founder-director of the factory Temur Grigoryan died in 1994 at the age of 58. After the privatization of the factory in 1995, the winery was turned into a limited liability company. T. Grigoryan's son Arayik Grigoryan became the chairman of the company, while Arayik's brothrt Aramayis Grigoryan became the executive director.

In 1998, the operations of the factory were expanded to include the production of cognac and vodka, in addition to it original wine production.

Since 1999, the company has exported its products to Russia, Canada, Georgia, Germany, Lithuania, Israel, France, Ukraine, and the United States.

As of 2013, the company has around 350 employees, of which 200 are working in the winery and 150 in the vineyards.

== Products and brands ==
Currently, the factory produces wine, cognac and vodka, all based on French technology.

The factory has a variety of Armenian Cognac brands, including: Avshar (5 years old), Erivan (5 and 25 years old), Gladzor (18 years old), Ardvin (5 years old), Marmara (5 years old), Tigris (5 years old), Vagharshapat (15 years old), Berdasar (10 years old), Erivanskaya Guberniya (20 years old), Haghpat (3 years old), Drevne Armyanskiy (25 years old), Tsar Armenak (5 years old), Alaverdi (7 years old) and Tigran (5 years old).

Vodka brands of the Avshar winery include: Pechatnaya classic transparent white vodka, Avshar Abrikosovaya apricot transparent white vodka, Avshar Kizilovaya cornelian cherry transparent white vodka, Avshar Tutovaya mulberry transparent white vodka and Imperskaya classic transparent white vodka.
