= Alla Levonyan =

Armenian singer (born 1975)

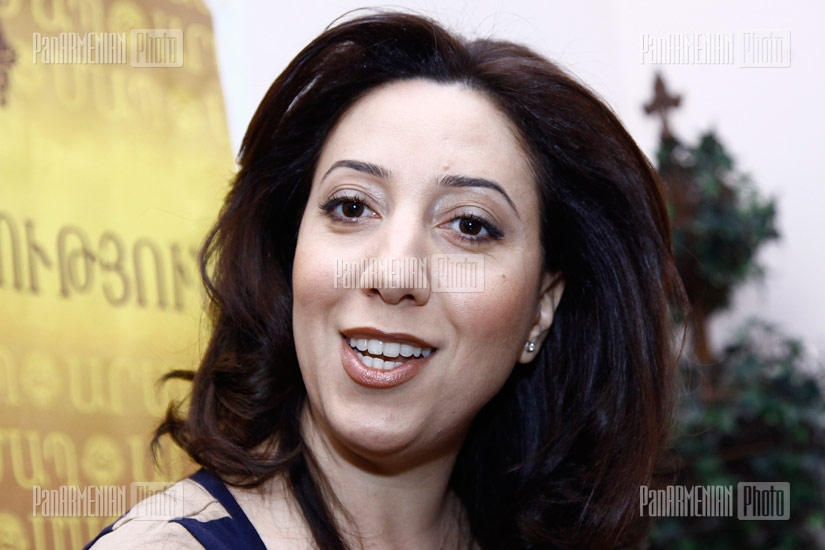
- Alla Levonyan (2012)

Background information
- Born: June 26, 1975 (age 51); Avshar, Ararat, Armenian SSR, Soviet Union
- Genres: Folk
- Occupation: Singer
- Instrument: Vocals
- Years active: 1993–present

Alla Zhorayi Levonyan (Armenian: Ալլա Ժորայի Լևոնյան; born June 26, 1975) is an Armenian singer, who is a recipient of the Honorary Worker of Culture of the Republic of Armenia award, which is an honorary title in Armenia. In 2007, she was appointed the UNICEF Armenia Goodwill Ambassador.

== Awards and titles ==
- Distinguished Artist of the Republic of Armenia (2011)
- The Gold Medal of the RA Ministry of Culture
- RA Ministry of Defense "Vazgen Sargsyan" Medal
- Best Modern Contemporary Album, Armenian Music Awards, 2002

== Discography ==
- Hayastan (2000)
- Msho Aghchik (2002)
- Gnam Hasnem (2003)
- The Best (2006)
- Maral (2006)

== Videos ==
- Live Concert (2009)

== Filmography ==
As herself
Year	Title	Notes
2016	Benefis (Բենեֆիս)	Special guest
2017	Hayastan Jan (Հայաստան Ջան)	Contestant
