= Nor Ughi =

Village in Ararat, Armenia

Nor Ughi Նոր ուղի
- Location within Armenia Location within Ararat
- Coordinates: 39°55′32″N 44°38′11″E
- Country: Armenia
- Province: Ararat
- Municipality: Vedi

Population (2011)
  - Total: 761
- Time zone: UTC+4
  - Summer (DST): UTC+5

Nor Ughi (Armenian: Նոր ուղի) is a village in the Vedi Municipality of the Ararat Province of Armenia. It literally means new way in Armenian. It was developed around the Vedi Wine Factory operating since 1956.
