= Merdzavan =

Village in Armavir, Armenia

Merdzavan Մերձավան
- Location within Armenia
- Coordinates: 40°10′47″N 44°23′59″E
- Country: Armenia
- Province: Armavir
- Founded: 1947
- Elevation: 945 m (3,100 ft)

Population (2011)
  - Total: 3,303
- Time zone: UTC+4 ( )
  - Summer (DST): UTC+5 ( )

Merdzavan (Armenian: Մերձավան), is a village in the Armavir Province of Armenia, located at the western suburbs of the capital Yerevan, north of the Parakar village.

As of the 2011 official census, Merdzavan has a population of 3,303.

== Geography ==
At a height of 945 meters above sea level, Merdzavan is located to the western edge of the Malatia-Sebastia District of the capital Yerevan. It is 40 km east of the provincial centre Armavir and 6 km east of Vagharshapat.

== See also ==
- Armavir Province
