= Proshyan =

Proshyan Պռոշյան
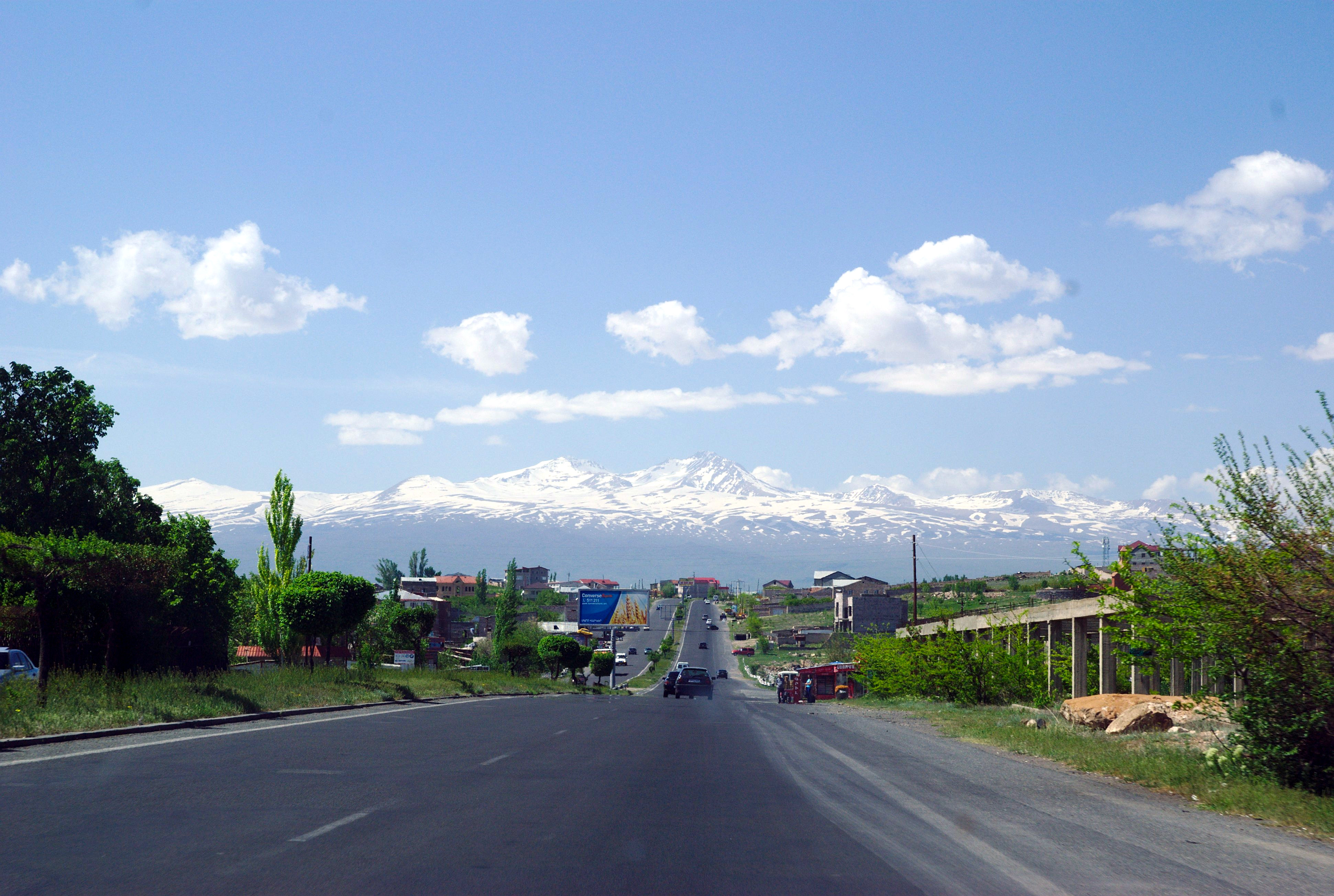
- Proshyan and Mount Aragats

- Location within Armenia
- Coordinates: 40°14′53″N 44°24′54″E
- Country: Armenia
- Marz (Province): Kotayk
- Elevation: 1,250 m (4,100 ft)

Population (2011)
  - Total: 5,147
- Time zone: UTC+4 ( )
- Postal code: 2413

Proshyan (Armenian: Պռոշյան) is a major village in the Kotayk Province of Armenia.

== See also ==
- Kotayk Province

== Notable people ==
- Petros Ghevondyan
- Tigran Hovhannisyan - "Multo Tiko"
