= Arevadasht =

Village in Armavir, Armenia

Arevadasht Արևադաշտ
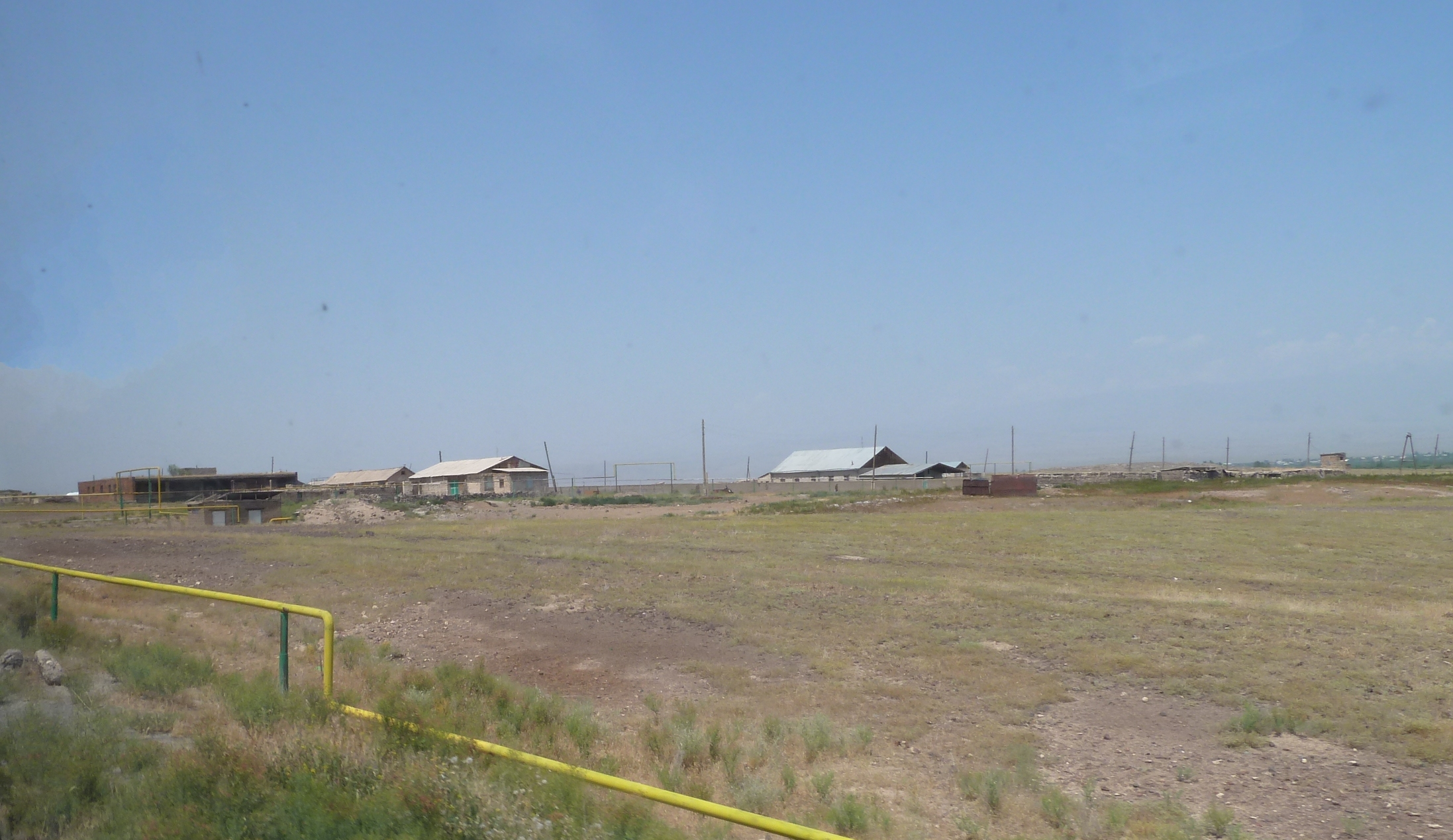
- Entering Arevadasht

- Location within Armenia
- Coordinates: 40°08′17″N 43°55′53″E
- Country: Armenia
- Marz (Province): Armavir

Population (2011)
  - Total: 283
- Time zone: UTC+4 ( )

Arevadasht (Armenian: Արևադաշտ), is a village in the Armavir Province of Armenia.

Arevadasht has a population of 283 at the 2011 census, down from 375 at the 2001 census.

The village is home to the "Karas" brandy factory.
