= Nor Yedesia =

Nor Yedesia Նոր Եդեսիա
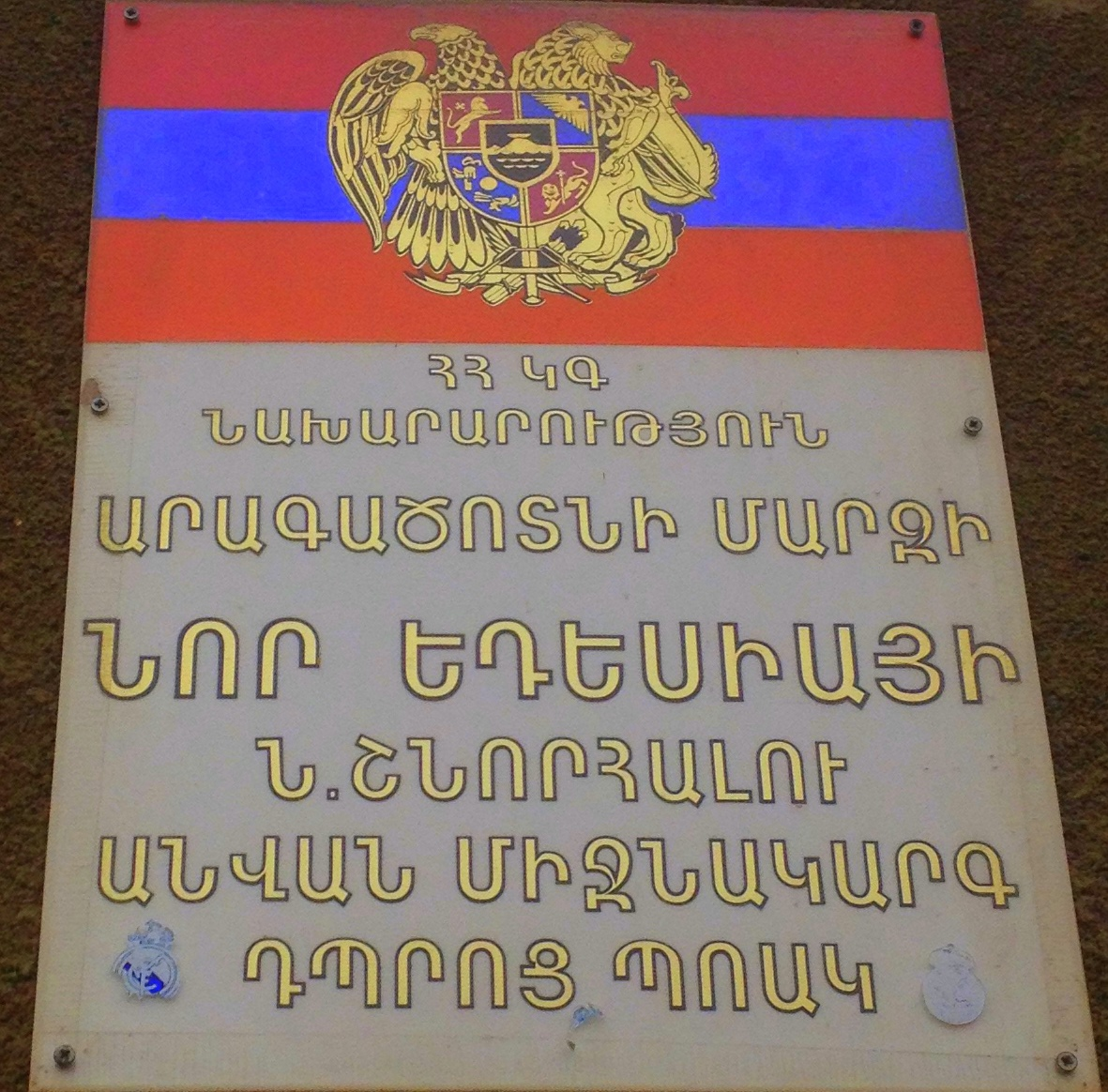
- ՆԵՐՍԵՍ Շնորհալու ԱՆՎԱՆ ԴՊՐՈՑ

- Location within Armenia Location within Aragatsotn
- Coordinates: 40°13′29″N 44°08′00″E
- Country: Armenia
- Province: Aragatsotn
- Municipality: Ashtarak
- Founded: 1975

Population (2024)
  - Total: 1,203
- Time zone: UTC+4

Nor Yedesia (Armenian: Նոր Եդեսիա) is a village in the Ashtarak Municipality of the Aragatsotn Province of Armenia. As of 2001, Nor Yedesia had a population of over 1,200.

Founded as a sovkhoz (collective farm) in 1975, Nor Yedesia today includes both privatized land and two sovkhozes. Of the 0.82 km^{2} (0.32 sq mi) of agricultural land within the boundaries of the village, 0.77 km^{2} (0.30 sq mi) are in the sovkhozes, with the larger being 0.52 km^{2} (0.20 sq mi) and the smaller being 0.25 km^{2} (0.097 sq mi).
