= Mrganush =

Mrganush Մրգանուշ
- Location within Armenia Location within Ararat
- Coordinates: 40°01′43″N 44°33′31″E
- Country: Armenia
- Province: Ararat
- Municipality: Artashat

Population (2011)
  - Total: 1,101
- Time zone: UTC+4
  - Summer (DST): UTC+5

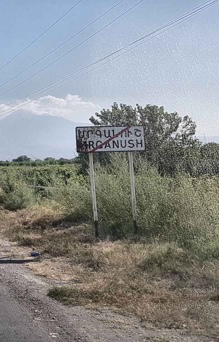
Street sign indicating Mrganush

Mrganush (Armenian: Մրգանուշ) is a village in the Artashat Municipality of the Ararat Province of Armenia.
