= Dalar, Armenia =

Dalar Դալար
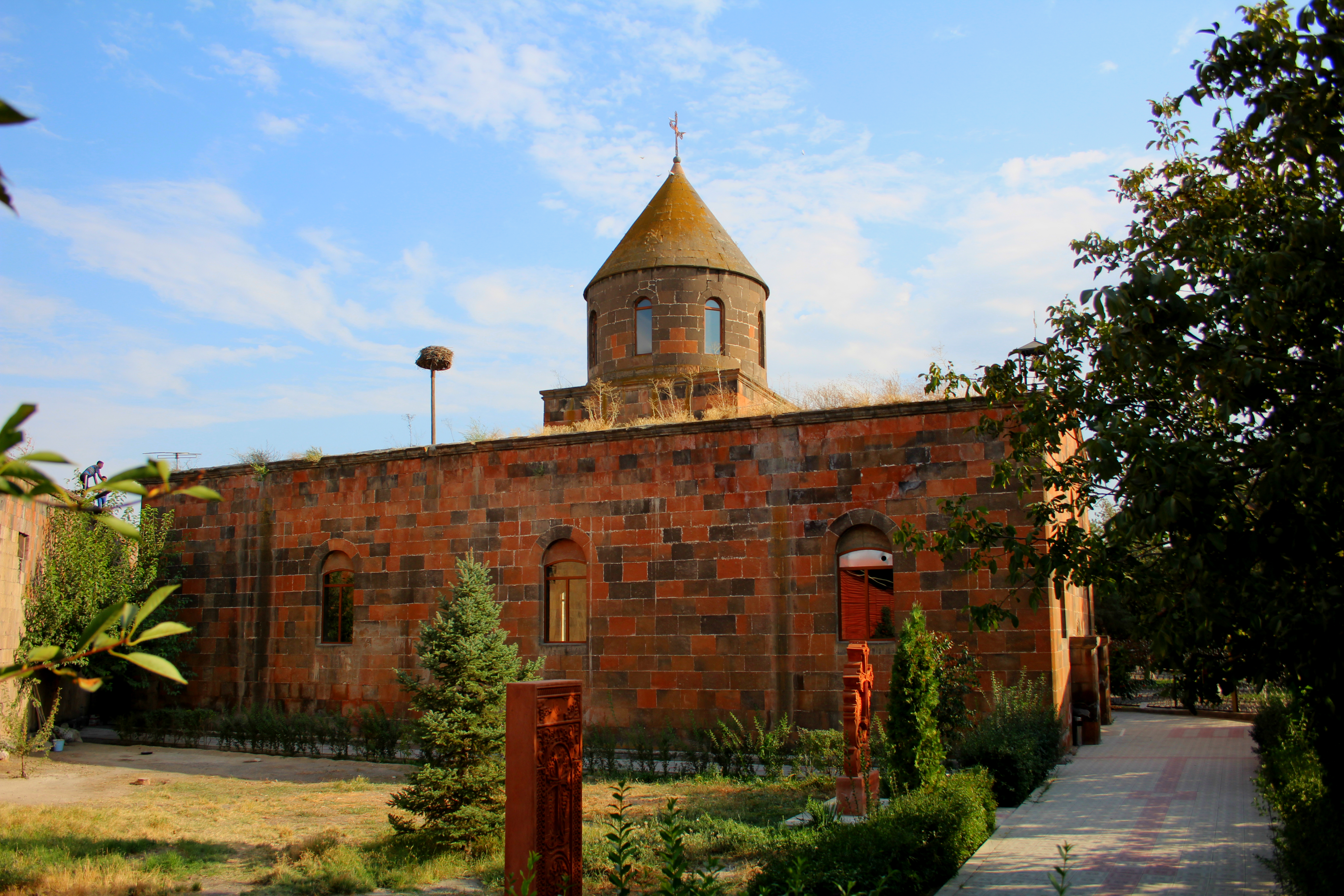
- St. Mariam Church

- Location within Armenia Location within Ararat
- Coordinates: 39°58′01″N 44°32′11″E
- Country: Armenia
- Province: Ararat
- Municipality: Artashat

Population (2011)
  - Total: 2,594
- Time zone: UTC+4
  - Summer (DST): UTC+5

Dalar (Armenian: Դալար) is a village in the Artashat Municipality of the Ararat Province of Armenia.
