= Taperakan =

Village in Ararat, Armenia

Taperakan Տափերական
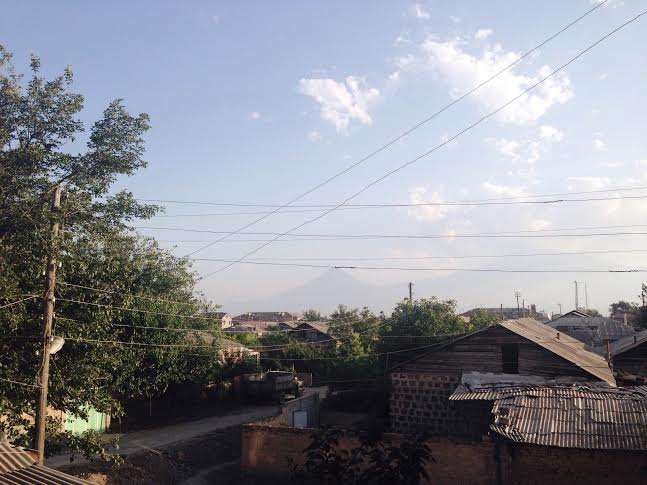
- Town Taperakan, Armenia

- Location within Armenia Location within Ararat
- Coordinates: 39°55′07″N 44°36′22″E
- Country: Armenia
- Province: Ararat
- Municipality: Vedi

Population (2011)
  - Total: 3,128
- Time zone: UTC+4
  - Summer (DST): UTC+5

Taperakan (Armenian: Տափերական) is a village in the Vedi Municipality of the Ararat Province of Armenia. The village used to be named for Sergey Kirov, an early Bolshevik leader.
