= Lenughi =

Lenughi Լենուղի
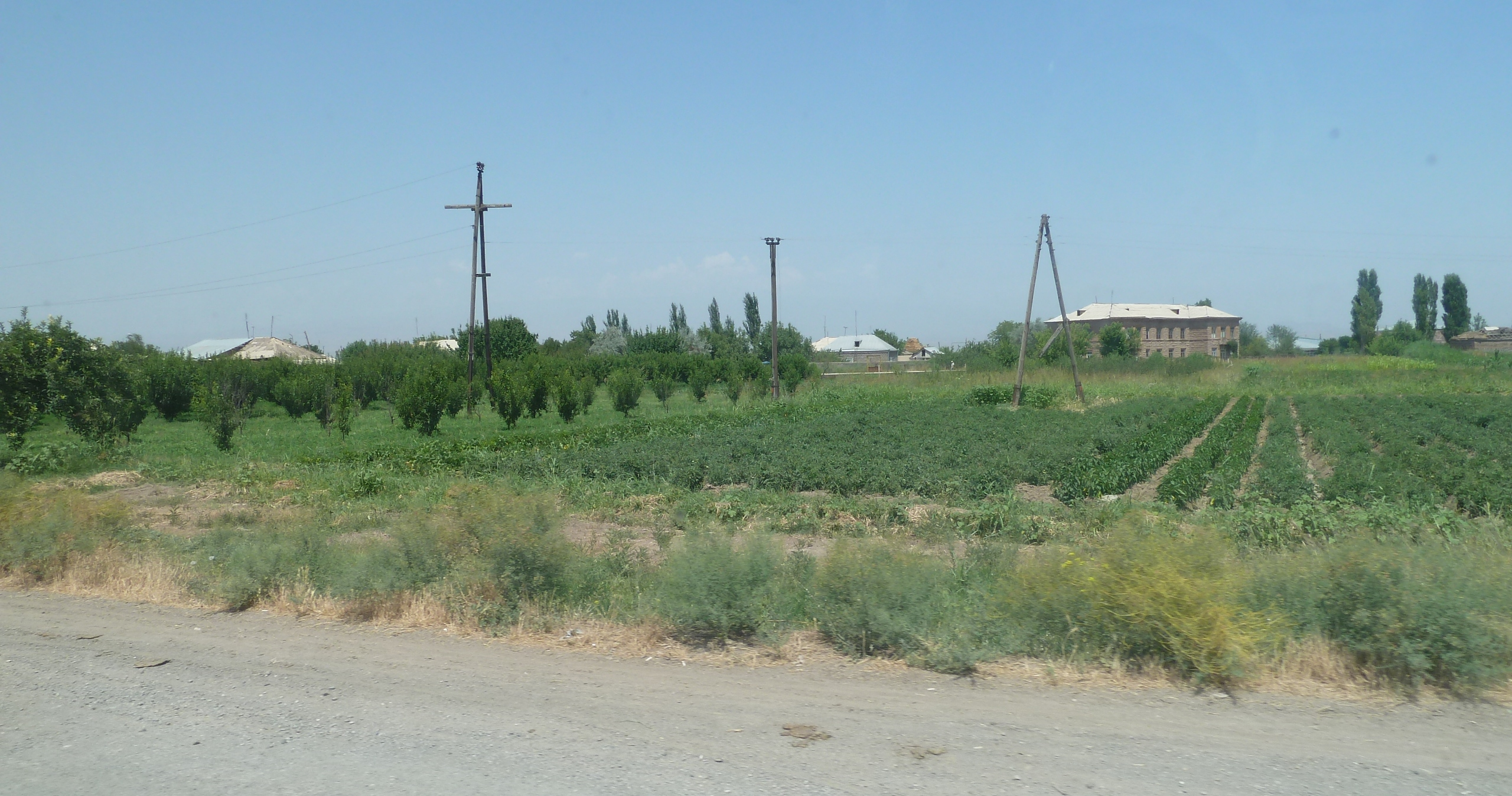
- Entering Lenughi

- Location within Armenia
- Coordinates: 40°07′26″N 43°57′55″E
- Country: Armenia
- Marz (Province): Armavir

Population (2011)
  - Total: 1,470
- Time zone: UTC+4 ( )
  - Summer (DST): UTC+5 ( )

Lenughi (Armenian: Լենուղի; until 1946, Aghlanli Nerkin and Yasakhli) is a village in the Armavir Province of Armenia. The town's church, dedicated to Saint Nshan, dates from the 1870s. The "MAP" brandy and wine factory is located in Lenughi.

== Notable people ==
- Rafael Yeranosyan (born 1981) - actor

== See also ==
- Armavir Province
