= Ginevet, Ararat =

Village in Ararat, Armenia

Ginevet Գինեվետ
- Location within Armenia Location within Ararat
- Coordinates: 39°55′59″N 44°37′27″E
- Country: Armenia
- Province: Ararat
- Municipality: Vedi

Population (2011)
  - Total: 569
- Time zone: UTC+4
  - Summer (DST): UTC+5

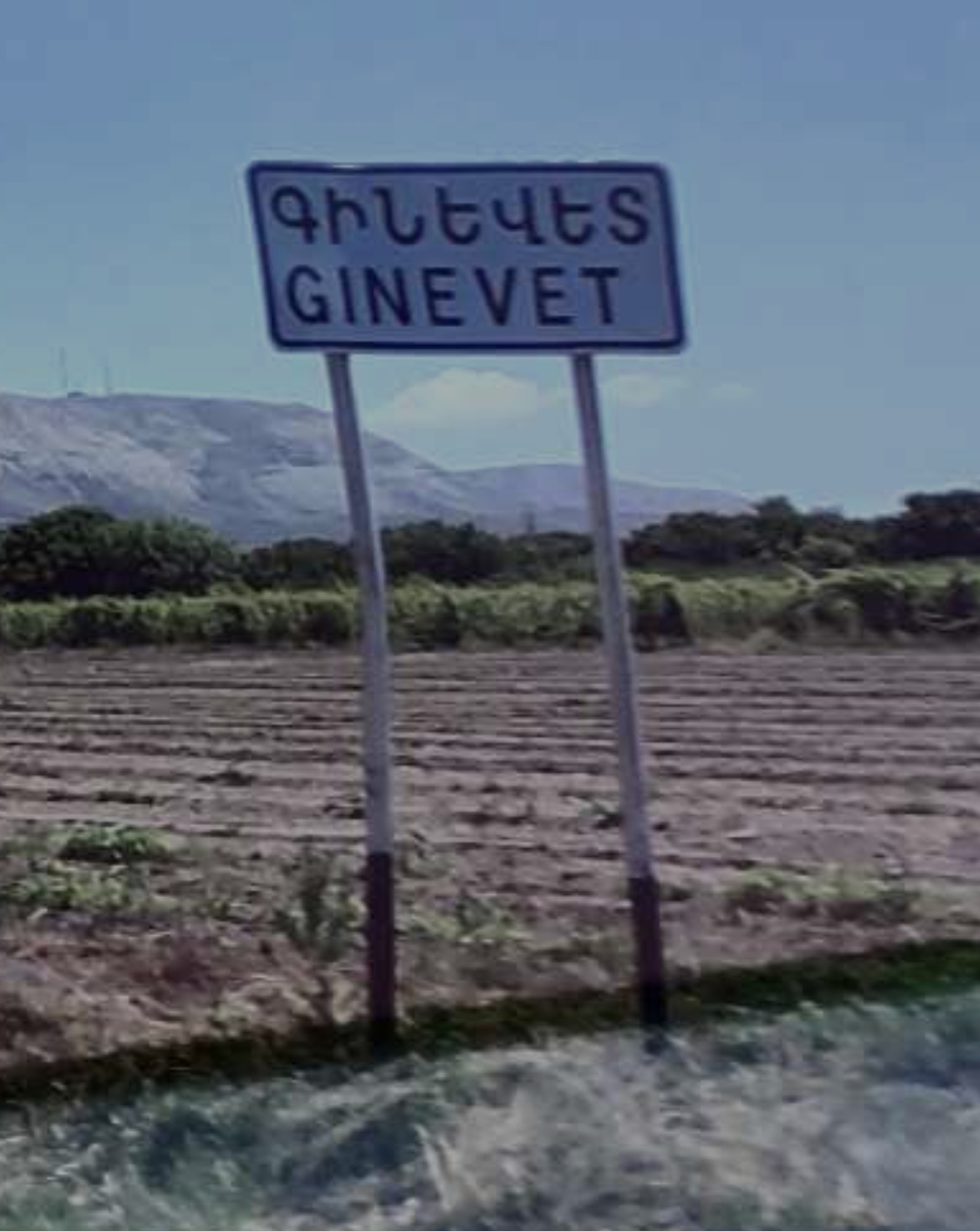
Village entrance for Ginevet, Armenia

Ginevet (Armenian: Գինեվետ) is a village in the Vedi Municipality of the Ararat Province of Armenia.
