= Aygestan =

Aygestan Այգեստան
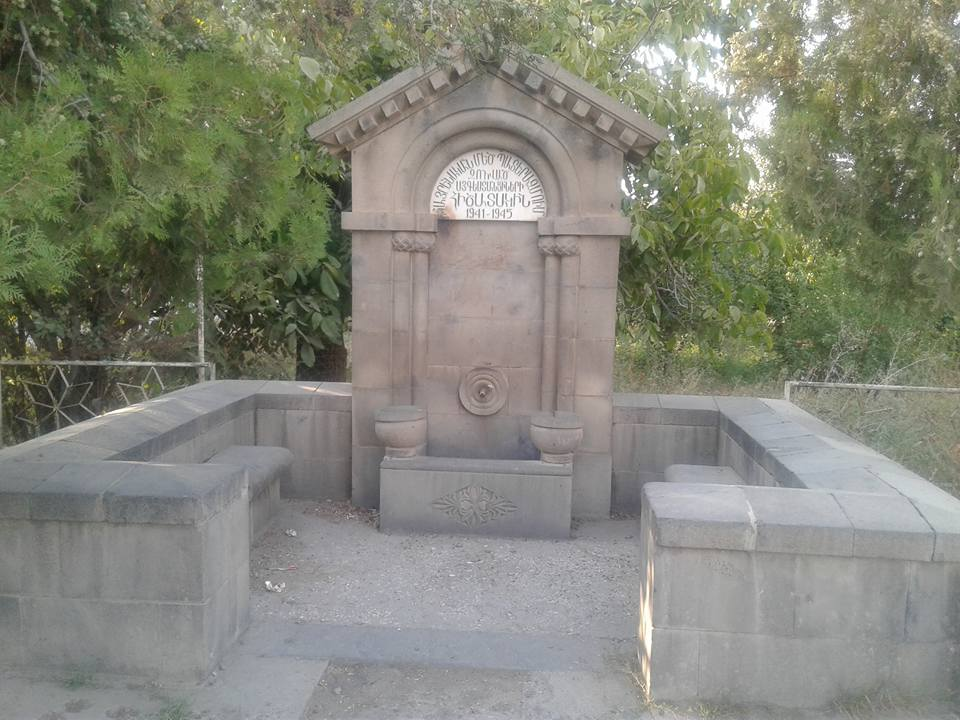
- Հուշաղբյուր, Այգեստան

- Location within Armenia Location within Ararat
- Coordinates: 40°00′09″N 44°33′28″E
- Country: Armenia
- Province: Ararat
- Municipality: Artashat
- Elevation: 921 m (3,022 ft)

Population (2011)
  - Total: 2,397
- Time zone: UTC+4
  - Summer (DST): UTC+5

Aygestan (Armenian: Այգեստան) is a village in the Artashat Municipality of the Ararat Province of Armenia.
