= Avshar, Ararat =

Avshar Ավշար
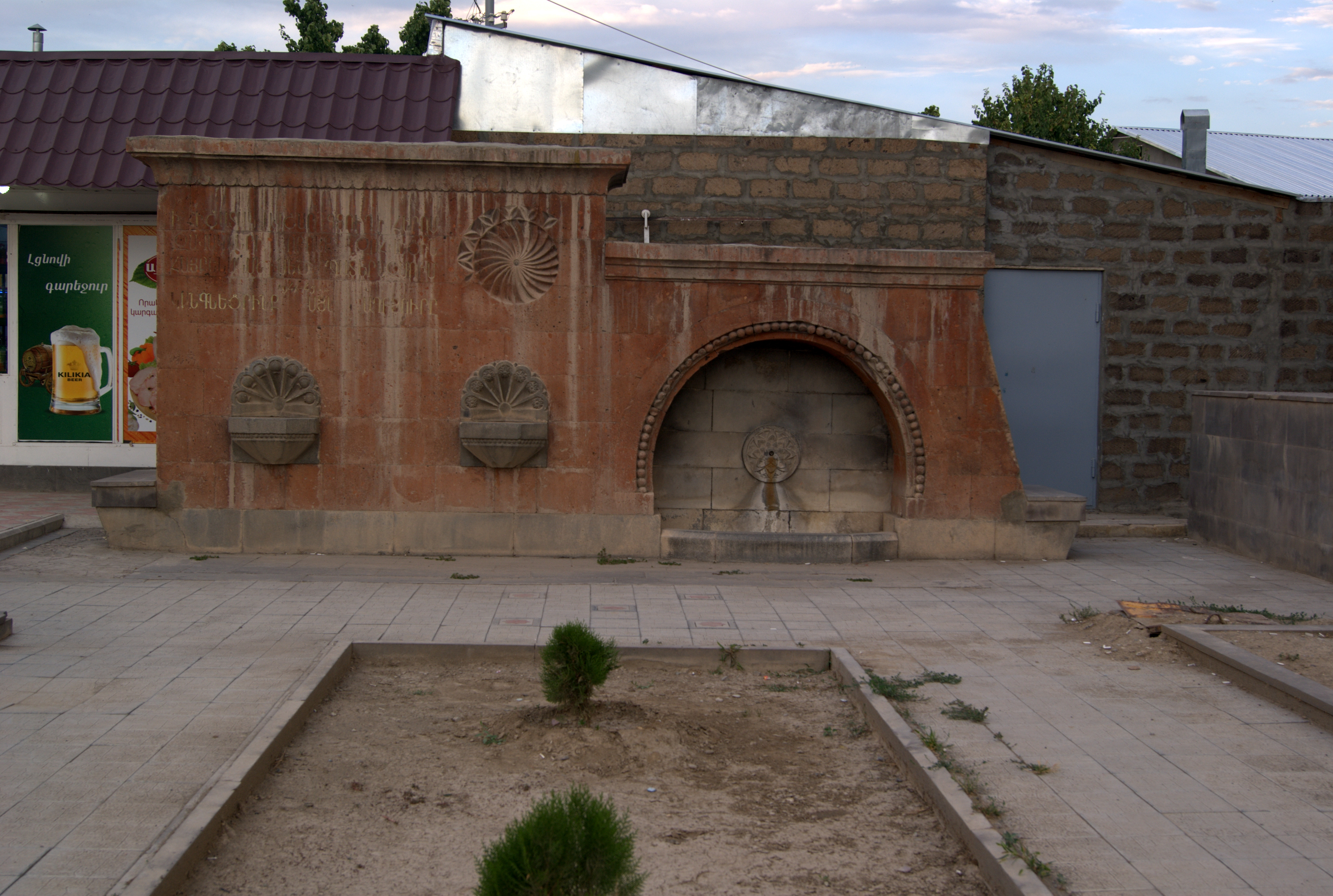
- Հուշաղբյուր Երկրորդ աշխարհամարտում զոհվածներին, Ավշար

- Location within Armenia Location within Ararat
- Coordinates: 39°50′26″N 44°41′01″E
- Country: Armenia
- Province: Ararat
- Municipality: Ararat

Population (2011)
  - Total: 4,929

Avshar (Armenian: Ավշար) is a village in the Ararat Municipality of the Ararat Province of Armenia. It hosted the 1993 and 1995 CYMA – Canadian Youth Mission to Armenia led by Archbishop Hovnan Derderian and Ronald Alepian.

== Notable people ==
- Alla Levonyan, singer
