= Armavir, Armenia =

Armavir Արմավիր
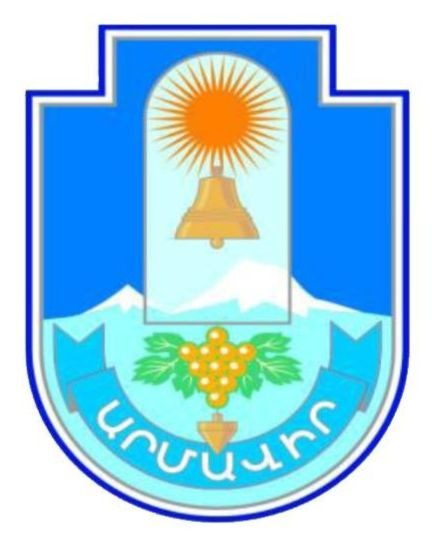
- Coat of arms

- Location within Armenia
- Coordinates: 40°09′00″N 44°02′24″E
- Country: Armenia
- Marz: Armavir
- Founded: 1931
- City status: 1947

Government
  - Type: Mayor Davit Khudatyan

Area
  - Total: 8.51 km^{2} (3.29 sq mi)
- Elevation: 870 m (2,850 ft)

Population (2022 census)
  - Total: 27,470
  - Density: 3,230/km^{2} (8,360/sq mi)
- Time zone: UTC+4 (AMT)
- Postal code: 0901-0918
- Area code: (+374) 237
- Website: Official website

Armavir (Armenian: Արմավիր [ɑɾmɑˈviɾ]), is a town and urban municipal community located in the west of Armenia serving as the administrative centre of Armavir Province. It was founded in 1931 by the government of the Armenian Soviet Socialist Republic. As of the 2011 census, the population of the town is 29,319, down from 46,900 as reported in the 1989 census. As of the 2022 census, the population of the town is 27,470. Currently, the town has a population of 38,495 as per the 2023 official estimate.

The town was known as Sardarapat before 1935, and Hoktemberyan from 1935 to 1995. Currently, Armavir is the seat of the Diocese of Armavir of the Armenian Apostolic Church.

== Etymology ==
Founded in 1931 as Sardarapat, the town was known as Hoktemberyan (meaning the city of October) between 1935 and 1995, named in honor of the October Revolution.

In 1992, the town was named Armavir by the government of independent Armenia, after the nearby ancient city of Armavir, that was founded in the 8th century BC by King Argishti I of Urartu

== History ==
The area of ancient Armavir has been inhabited since the 6th millennium BC. Various obsidian instruments, bronze objects and pottery have been found from that period. Armenian accounts held the city to have founded by King Aramais, a grandson of Hayk, around 1980 BC.

During the first half of the 8th century BC, King Argishti I of Urartu built a fortress in the area and named it Argishtikhinili. In 331 BC, when Armenia under the Orontid dynasty asserted its independence from the Achaemenid Empire, Armavir was chosen as the capital of Armenia. Slabs of clay have been found from the Achaemenid period written in the Elamite language concerning episodes of the Gilgamesh epic. Various inscriptions in Hellenistic Greek carved around the third century BC, have been found, including poetry from Hesiod, lines from Euripides, a list of Macedonian months, and names of Orontid Kings.

According to the 5th-century Armenian historian Movses Khorenatsi, Armavir was the first capital of the Kingdom of Armenia (although, from a geographical standpoint, the first capital of Armenia was Van). Movses' history preserves a tradition that when King Valarsace the Parthian settled in Armavir (ca. 149 BC), he built a temple there and asked prince aspet (knight) Smbat of the Bagratuni dynasty to give up his religion and worship idols. But Smbat refused to comply. Movses also relates that when King Tigranes II (whom he places on the throne from 90 to 36 BC), in order to take revenge on Queen Cleopatra of Egypt, sent an expedition to Palestine, he carried a great number of Jews into captivity, and settled them in Armavir and in Vardges. Movses goes on to state that later Jews were transferred from Armavir to Yervandashat, and under King Artashes I, were again transferred into the new capital Artashat. When King Sapor II of Persia invaded Armenia (360–370), he led away from Artashat 30,000 Armenian and 9,000 Jewish families, the latter brought by King Tigranes from Judea, and then completely destroyed the city.

In 591, during the reign of emperor Maurice, Armavir (then called Armaouira) and much of Armenia came under Roman administration after the Romans defeated the Sassanid Persian Empire at the battle of the Blarathon.

During Antiquity, Armavir was taken by the Seleucids, Parthians, Roman Empire, Sassanids and Byzantine Empire before it was taken over by the Arabs in 645. By the decision of the Soviet government, the settlement of Armavir was founded as Sardarabat on 26 July 1931, only 8 km north of the ancient city of Armavir, to become the regional centre of the Hoktemberyan raion created earlier in 1930 (known as Ghurdughuli raion until 1935). It was originally founded as a railway station connecting Yerevan with Leninakan (Gyumri). The first major urban plan of the town was introduced by architect Alexander Tamanian.

In 1935, the name of the settlement was changed from Sardarabat to Hoktemberyan in honor of the 1917 October Revolution. At the beginning, it was home to Armenian families who migrated from Javakheti, Shirak and Zangezur. During the 1940s, many Yazidis and Kurds from the nearby villages have also settled in Hoktemberyan. With the rapid development of the settlement as an industrial hub, Hoktemberyan was given the status of a town in 1947.

The population of the town was further increased in the 1950s and 1960s upon the arrival of repatriated Armenian families from Iran, Syria and Lebanon. In 1966, the Armavir branch of the Yerevan Brandy Company was opened. In 1967, Hokberyan became a city of republican subordination.

Following the independence of Armenia in 1991, Hoktemberyan was renamed Armavir on 7 November 1995, to become the provincial centre of the newly formed Armavir Province, as per the 1995 administrative reforms of Armenia.

== Geography ==
Modern-day Armavir occupies an area of 8.51 km^{2} within the fertile Ararat plain, at a road distance of 47 km west of the capital Yerevan.

The territory around Armavir is among the most important regions of Ancient Armenia. The town is built 6 km northeast of the ancient city of Argishtikhinili and 8 km north of historic Armavir. The region corresponds with the Aragatsotn canton of the ancient Armenian Kingdom.

The town is surrounded by many large villages including Sardarapat, Norapat, Mrgashat, Maysisyan and Noravan.

=== Climate ===
Armavir has a cold semi-arid climate (Köppen climate classification BSk), with cold winters and hot summers.

Climate data for Armavir (normals and extremes for 1991-2020)
Month	Jan	Feb	Mar	Apr	May	Jun	Jul	Aug	Sep	Oct	Nov	Dec	Year
Record high °C (°F)	15.0 (59.0)	21.0 (69.8)	28.5 (83.3)	33.0 (91.4)	35.0 (95.0)	38.5 (101.3)	41.5 (106.7)	40.5 (104.9)	37.5 (99.5)	35.0 (95.0)	24.5 (76.1)	19.6 (67.3)	41.5 (106.7)
Daily mean °C (°F)	−3.3 (26.1)	0.0 (32.0)	6.8 (44.2)	12.7 (54.9)	17.4 (63.3)	22.3 (72.1)	25.9 (78.6)	25.8 (78.4)	20.5 (68.9)	13.7 (56.7)	5.8 (42.4)	−0.7 (30.7)	12.2 (54.0)
Record low °C (°F)	−28.0 (−18.4)	−24.0 (−11.2)	−12.2 (10.0)	−9.6 (14.7)	0.3 (32.5)	5.5 (41.9)	7.3 (45.1)	9.5 (49.1)	−2.0 (28.4)	−4.0 (24.8)	−10.6 (12.9)	−28.0 (−18.4)	−28.0 (−18.4)
Average precipitation mm (inches)	18.2 (0.72)	17.6 (0.69)	23.1 (0.91)	40.5 (1.59)	44.5 (1.75)	22.0 (0.87)	13.1 (0.52)	8.0 (0.31)	11.0 (0.43)	22.9 (0.90)	19.8 (0.78)	18.4 (0.72)	259.1 (10.19)
Average precipitation days (≥ 1.0 mm)	4.2	3.8	5.3	7.3	9.1	5.3	2.7	1.9	2.3	4.9	4.2	4.8	55.8
Average relative humidity (%)	72.7	68.2	60.8	57.8	57.1	49.5	45.6	45.9	50.7	58	64.4	71.8	58.5
Mean monthly sunshine hours	70.9	111.6	162.2	177	232.8	309.8	328.3	313.6	262	178.9	134.1	67.2	2,348.4
Source: NOAA

== Demographics ==
Upon its foundation in 1931, the town was originally populated by Armenians from Javakheti, Shirak and Zangezur. Later, Yazidis, Kurds and Assyrians from the nearby villages have also settled in Armavir. Many Armenians from Iran, Syria and Lebanon were resettled in Armavir during the 1950s and 1960s, as part of the Armenian repatriation process.

The town's population reached its peak with around 47,000 during the final years of the Soviet Union. Following the independence of Armenia and the resulting economic crisis, it has drastically declined, showing 32,034 in the 2001 census, 29,319 in the 2011 census, and around 28,900 as per the 2016 official estimate.

The town's Saint Gregory of Narek Church was opened on 30 May 2014 and named after Saint Gregory of Narek. Since its consecration in 2014, the church became the seat of the Diocese of Armavir of the Armenian Apostolic Church.

The healthcare in the town is served by the Armavir Medical Center, with a capacity of 280 beds.

== Culture ==
The territory of modern-day Armavir is surrounded with many archaeological sites that are considered major centers of ancient Armenian civilization, including the nearby settlements of Metsamor, ancient Armavir, and ancient Argishtikhinili.

Currently, Armavir is served by a cultural center, commonly known as the Red Club. It is also home to a music school, a school of arts, five public libraries, and a theatrical group. There is a private zoological/botanical garden at the northeastern vicinity of the town.

In 2016, the town celebrated the 85th anniversary of its foundation, with the presence of delegates from the Russian cities of Armavir and Shakhty.

== Transportation ==
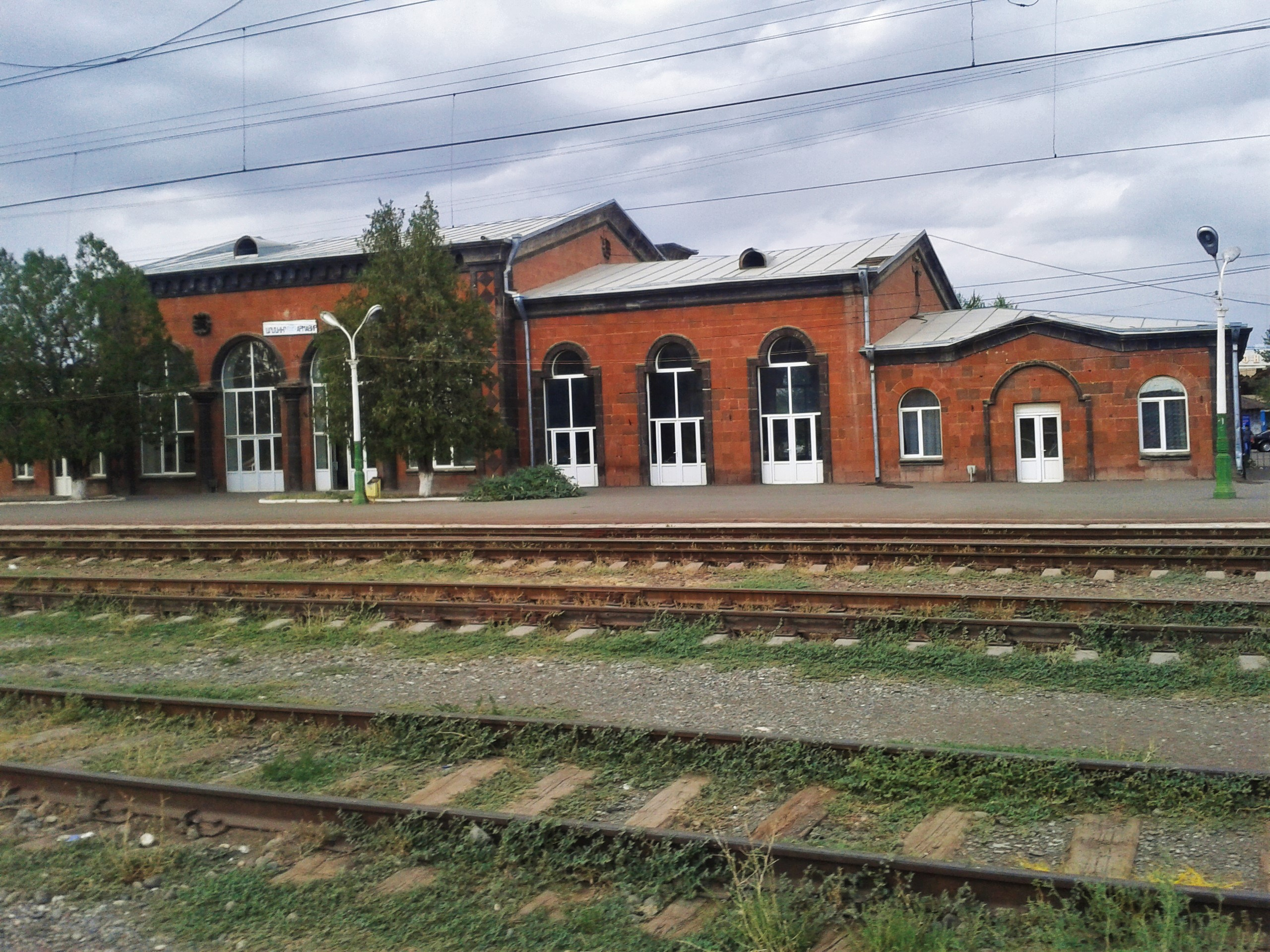
Armavir railway station

The town of Armavir is founded on the basis of the train station operating since 1927, as a railway junction between Yerevan and Leninakan/Gyumri. The station was renovated in the 2000s. In November 2009, the station was provided with an electric locomotive that connects Armavir with the Aragatsavan station and northwestern Armenia.

The town is also connected with Yerevan and central Armenia through the M-5 Motorway. The H-17 regional road connects Armavir with Gyumri and other parts of northern Armenia.

== Economy ==
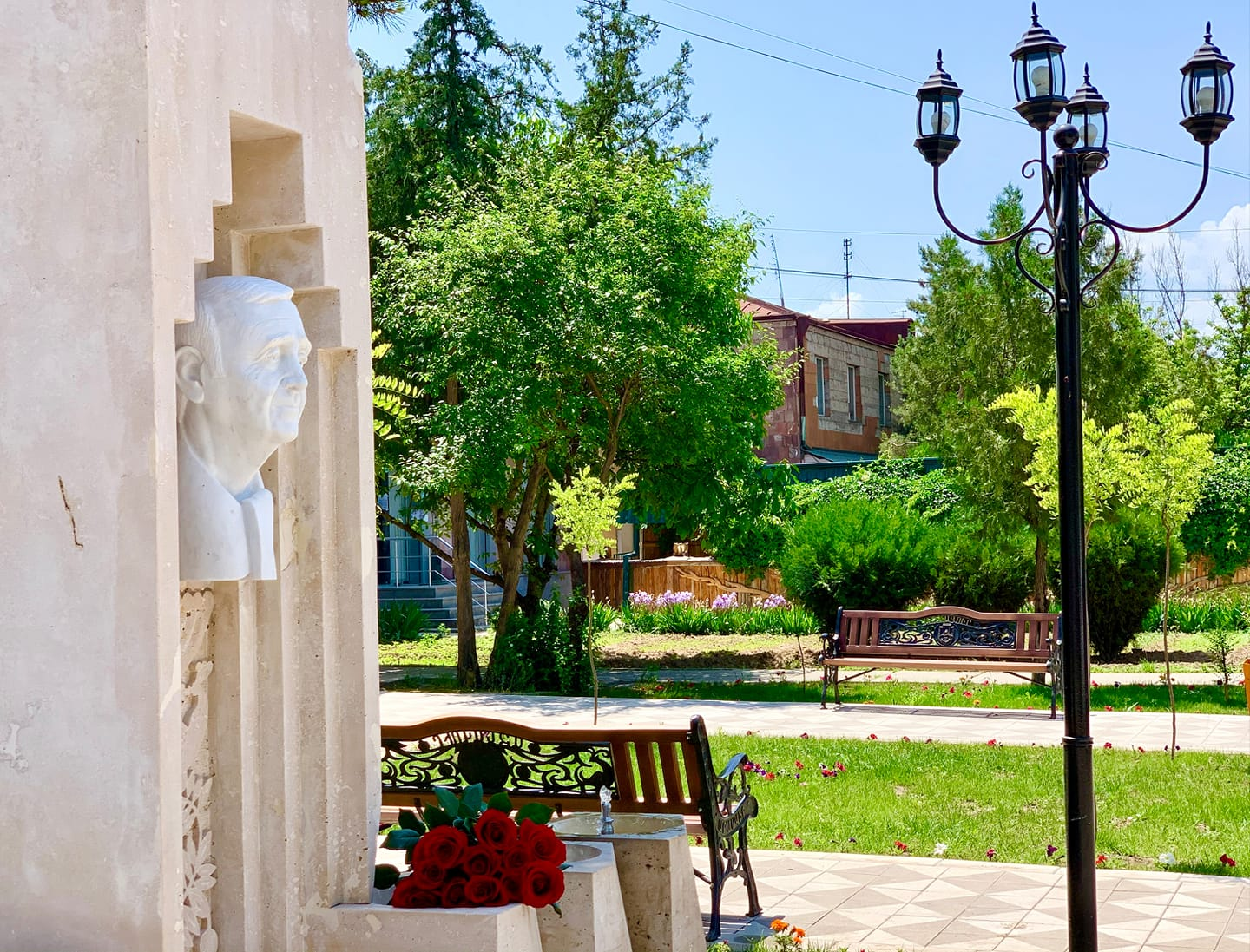
Charles Aznavour Park

Since its foundation, Armavir has gradually developed as an important centre for industries, as well as services. The industry of the town is mainly based on food-processing and building materials production.

The cotton mill of Armavir opened in 1928 was the first industrial plant of the town. The Hoktemberyan Cannery, which opened in 1943, was among the largest food-processing plants in the Soviet Union. The Armavir branch of the Yerevan Brandy Company has operated since 1966. The glass factory of Armavir is a major glass container producer for the entire republic. There is a water treatment facility in the eastern suburbs of the town.

As a provincial centre, Armavir is home to many branches of prominent banks currently operating in Armenia.

Armavir air base was built near the town during the early 20th century and became one of the largest jet pilot training centers for the Soviet Air Force.

== Education ==
As of 2015, Armavir has 10 public schools, 12 nurseries, 2 intermediate colleges, 3 sport schools, and a school for children with special needs. Armavir is also home to the Tigran Mets Sports and Military College.

The Armavir provincial medical centre is located in the town as well.

== Sports ==
FC Armavir was the football club who represented the town during the Soviet years. It was founded in 1965 as FC Sevan Hoktemberyan. After the collapse of the Soviet Union, FC Armavir participated in the Armenian Leagues mainly throughout the 1990s. The club was dissolved in 2003 due to financial difficulties. The club used to play their home games at the Jubilee Stadium which has a capacity of 10,000 spectators. In 1985, the stadium hosted one group match during the FIFA World Youth Championship hosted by the Soviet Union. Nowadays, it is serving the young teams of the Armavir football school.

In February 2017, the Football Federation of Armenia has launched the construction of a football academy in Armavir. With an approximate cost of US$3 million, the construction is being jointly financed by the FFA, UEFA and FIFA. It is expected to be completed by October 2019.

Martial arts including judo, muay thai sambo and taekwondo are also popular in the town. The Mayor's cup tournament of judo is annually held in Armavir. The town's sport school was entirely renovated in 2007.

== Notable people ==
- Arame, pop singer
- Arajik Marutjan, amateur welterweight boxer

== Twin towns – sister cities ==
Armavir is twinned with:

- Allauch, France
- Armavir, Russia
- Feodosiya, Ukraine
- Shakhty, Russia
- Kerman, Iran

The following are no longer active as of 2018:

- Galveston, Texas, United States

== See also ==
- Armavir (ancient city)
- Armavir (village)
- Armavir, Russia
