= Sardarapat, Armenia =

Village in Armavir, Armenia

Sardarapat Սարդարապատ
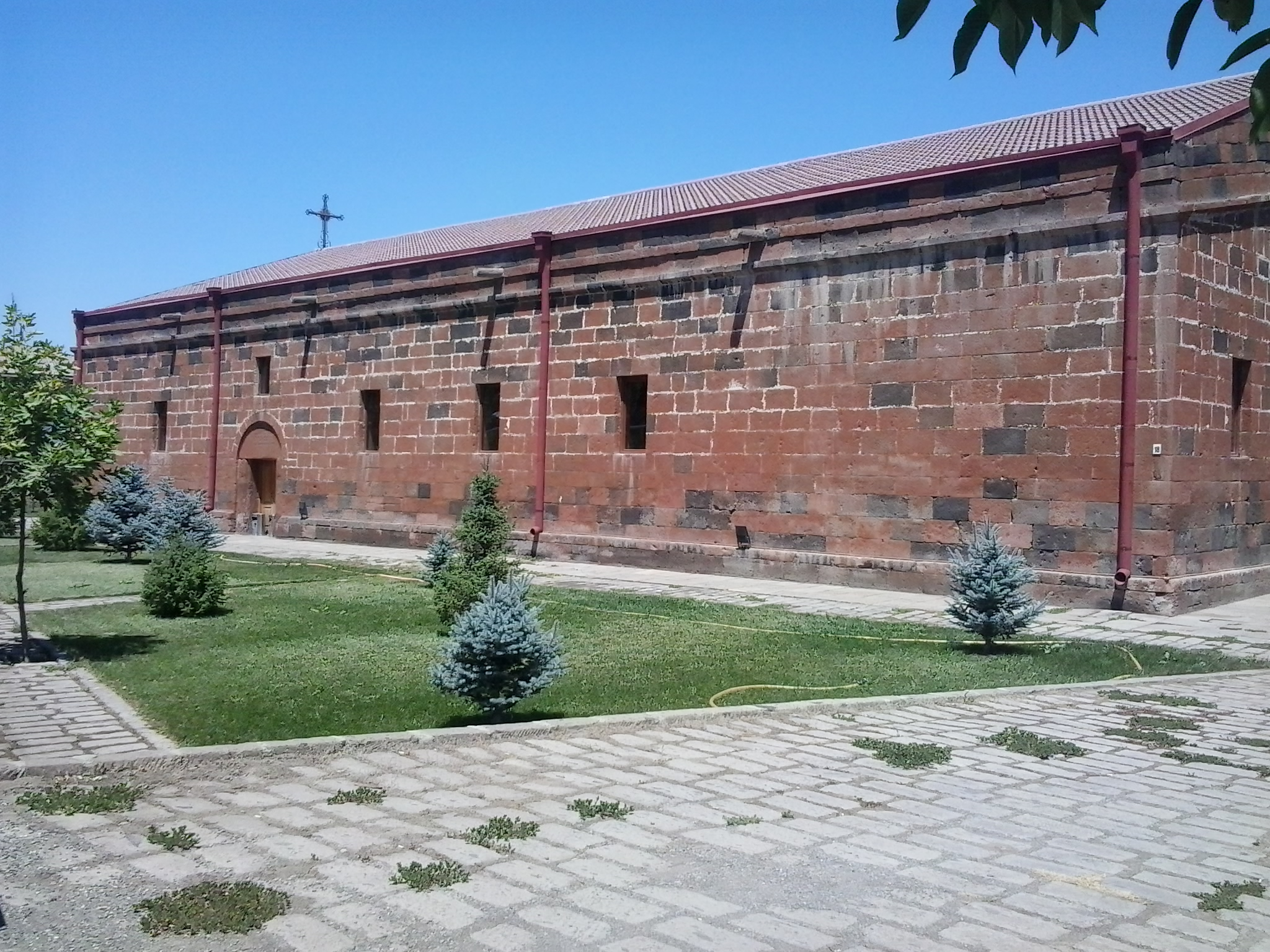
- Holy Mother of God Church in Sardarapat

- Location within Armenia
- Coordinates: 40°08′10″N 44°00′50″E
- Country: Armenia
- Province: Armavir

Population (2011)
  - Total: 5,192

Sardarapat (Armenian: Սարդարապատ), is a major village in the Armavir province of Armenia. The settlement was originally known as Sardarapat until 1935 when it was renamed Hoktember (October) in memory of the 1917 October Revolution.

In 1967, the village of Norapat was absorbed by Hoktember. However, the original name of the village was restored in 2009.

The name Sardarapat is derived from the major Persian fortress of Sardari Berd, built around 1810 by the last Persian Qajar governor of the Erivan Khanate; Hossein Khan Sardar, with British technical assistance using stones taken from the ruins of ancient Armavir. Many of the stones are still bearing traces of cuneiform inscriptions.

The town was set as administrative centre for the Sardarapat district and summer residence of the Khan of Erivan. The Sardar's fortress was taken by the Russians under General Paskevich in 1828, despite stout defense by Sardar Hasan Khan.

Currently, almost no trace of the fortress is left.

The Sardarapat Memorial commemorating the Battle of Sardarapat is located in the nearby village of Araks.

== See also ==
- Armavir Province

== See also ==
- Sardarapat memorial
- Battle of Sardarapat
