= Sardarabad (fortress) =

19th-century fortress in Iran

- Near Nor Armavir, Armavir Province, Armenia
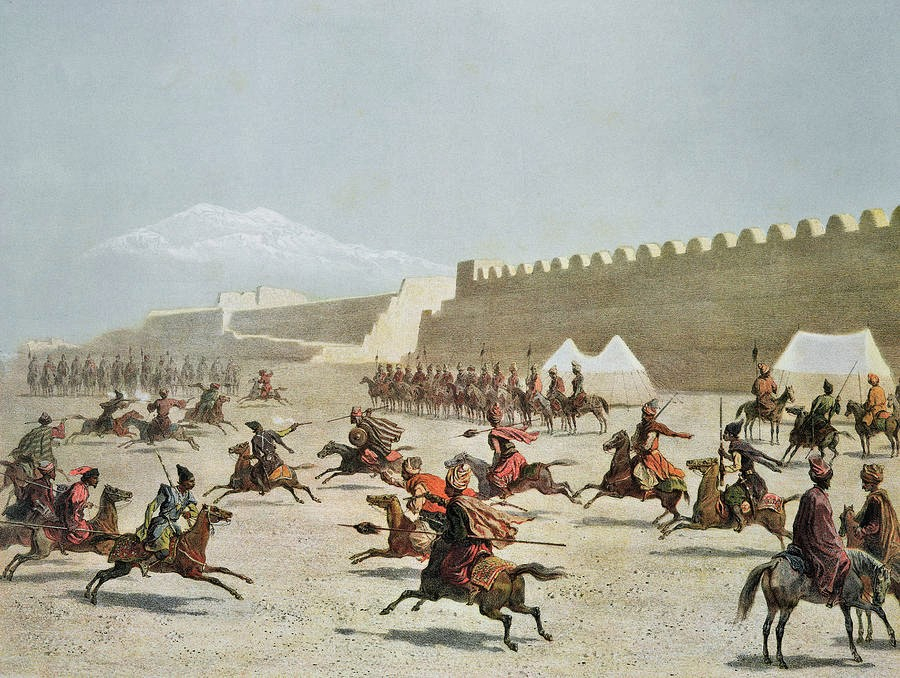
- Trick Riding of Kurds and Tatars in front of the Fortress Sardarabad (Sardari Berd) in Armenia, a mid-19th-century painting by the Russian artist Grigory Gagarin, who was there as a soldier

Site information
- Type: Fortress
- Condition: Destroyed

Location
- Shown within Armenia
- Location within Armenia
- Coordinates: 40.1361°N 44.0139°E

Site history
- Built: 1807-1827
- Materials: Stone
- Battles/wars: Captured by the Russians under General Afanasy Krasovsky on 20 September 1827

Sardarabad (Armenian: Սարդարապատ, romanized: Sardarapat; Persian: سردارآباد, romanized: Sardâr-âbâd), also known as Sardari Berd (Armenian: Սարդարի բերդ, lit. 'Sardar's fortress'), was a 19th-century fortress and urban center built in the Erivan Khanate in Qajar Iran, in the territory of modern-day Armenia. Its ruins are located near the village of Nor Armavir in the Armavir Province of Armenia.

== History ==
The fortress was built under Hossein Qoli Khan (r. 1807–1828), the sardar of Erivan (Yerevan). (Note: Sources differ on the date of the construction of the fortress. The Armenian Soviet Encyclopedia and Hovhannesian give 1819 as the founding date, while Nercissian gives 1815–1817. Behrooz discusses the fortification of the fortress by French engineers as occurring as early as 1808.) It was established to protect the usual invasion route from Russia and the Ottoman Empire and to serve as a summer residence for the khanate's rulers. The sardar's brother Hasan Khan made the fortress his usual residence, using it to conduct raids into Georgia and the Ottoman Empire. British experts participated in the construction of the fortress. French engineers fortified the fortress around 1808. It was constructed mainly using stones taken from the ruins of the hilltop fortress of the ancient city of Armavir (earlier Urartian Argishtikhinili).

The fortress was quadrangular and had four gates and double walls fortified with large towers. The khan's palace and storehouses were located next to the southern wall and were surrounded by large gardens, which were irrigated by the water of a canal from the Aras River to the fortress. The newly built fortress became a minor urban center inhabited by about 500 Armenians—mostly artisans and merchants—originating from Bayazit and Arjesh in the Ottoman Empire. The considerable Muslim population of the fortress consisted mainly of military personnel and departed in its entirety after the fall of the fortress in 1827. The Armenian population founded a church called Surb Astvatsatsin (St. Mary's), which had its own school. The sardar established a customs house and caravanserai near the fortress to take advantage of the caravan route from Erzurum and Kars which passed through Sardarabad.

The fortress was still not fully completed when the Russo-Persian War of 1826–1828 broke out. Sardarabad was besieged by Russian troops under the command of General Afanasy Krasovsky in September 1827. The fortress was defended by a garrison of 2000 soldiers under the command of Hasan Khan. The southern wall collapsed because of shelling, and Hasan Khan fled the fortress on the night of September 19. On September 20, the fortress was captured by Russian troops. (Note: See Parsamian & Nikoyan 1978, illustration 9, for artist V. I. Mashkov's painting of the siege of Sardarabad.) According to Mkrtich Nercissian, the fortress's gates were opened by the local Armenian population. The Russians captured thirteen pieces of artillery and large stores of bread and freed many Armenian and Georgian prisoners from the fortress. The fort was gradually deserted and became a ruin. According to one source, the Armenian population of Sardarabad resettled in nearby villages soon after the fortress's capture. However, according to another source, 70 Armenian families were still living there in the 1870s, (Note: Hovhannesian cites this same statistic for the 1830s instead of the 1870s.) and the church and school were operating. Almost nothing remains of the fortress today, as its ruins were reused as building material.

== See also ==
- Erivan Fortress
