= Armavir (village) =

Village in Armavir, Armenia

Armavir Արմավիր
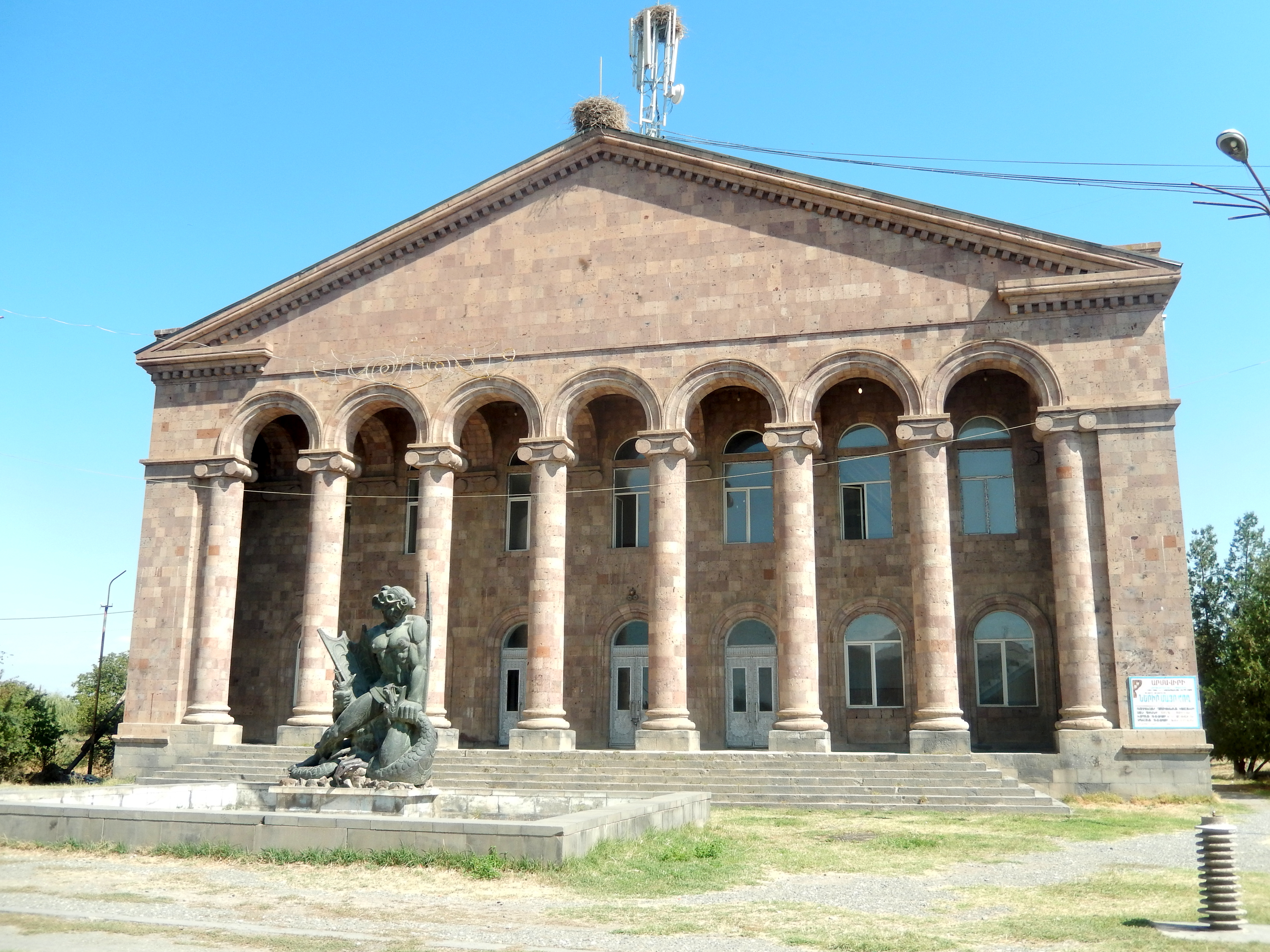

- Location within Armenia
- Coordinates: 40°05′23″N 44°02′54″E
- Country: Armenia
- Marz (Province): Armavir
- Founded: 1613

Population (2011)
  - Total: 3,319
- Time zone: UTC+4 ( )
  - Summer (DST): UTC+5 ( )

Armavir (Armenian: Արմավիր) is a village in the Armavir Province of Armenia near the Armenia–Turkey border. Cuneiform inscriptions of Urartian King Sarduri II were found at Armavir.

The village was founded in 1613, 1 km east of the site of ancient Armavir. After the Ottoman occupation, Armavir was renamed Ghurdughuli by the Turks in 1635. After the Soviet occupation of Armenia, the name of the village was renamed back Armavir in 1935.

== History ==
=== Antiquity ===
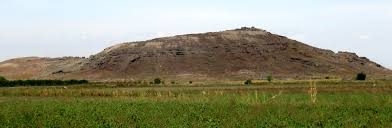
The site of ancient Armavir on the hill west of Armavir village

The area of ancient Armavir was inhabited since the sixth millennium BC. Various obsidian instruments, bronze objects and pottery have been found from that period. Armavir was regarded as an ancient capital of Armenia, said to have been founded by King Aramais in 1980 BC.

During the first half of the eighth century BC, King Argishti I of Urartu built a fortress in the area and named it Argishtikhinili. In 331 BC, when Armenia under the Orontid dynasty asserted its independence from the Achaemenid Empire, Armavir was chosen as the capital of Armenia. Slabs of clay have been found from the Achaemenid period written in the Elamite language concerning episodes of the Gilgamesh epic. Various inscriptions in Hellenistic Greek carved around the third century BC, have been found, including poetry from Hesiod, lines from Euripides, a list of Macedonian months, and names of Orontid Kings.

According to the fifth-century Armenian historian Movses Khorenatsi, Armavir was the first capital of the kingdom of Armenia (although, from a geographical standpoint, the first capital of Armenia was Van). Movses has preserved the tradition that when King Valarsace the Parthian settled in Armavir (ca. 149 BC), he built a temple there and asked prince aspet (knight) Smbat of the Bagratuni dynasty to give up his religion and worship idols. But Smbat refused to comply. Movses also relates that when King Tigranes II (whom he places on the throne from 90 to 36 BC), in order to take revenge on Queen Cleopatra of Egypt, sent an expedition to Palestine, he carried a great number of Jews into captivity, and settled them in Armavir and in Vardges. Movses goes on to state that later Jews were transferred from Armavir to Yervandashat; and under King Artashes I, were again transferred into the new capital Artashat. When King Sapor II of Persia invaded Armenia (360–370), he led away from Artashat 30,000 Armenian and 9,000 Jewish families, the latter brought by King Tigranes from Palestine, and then completely destroyed the city.

During Antiquity, Armavir was taken by the Seleucids, Parthians, Roman Empire, Sassanids and Byzantine Empire before it was taken over by the Arabs in 645.

=== Medieval Armavir ===
Arabic sovereignty lasted until the first quarter of the ninth century. The Sajids managed this region in the ninth century. After that, the Armenian Bagratuni dynasty returned this place. The Byzantine Empire reconquered this region in 1045 but this region passed to Seljuk Turks in 1064, who renamed the city Sardarabad. This region was passed among Georgians and Armenians, Eldiguzids and Khwarezmid Empire after Seljuk's decline. Mongols captured this region in 1239 and founded Ilkhanid state in 1256. This region was passed to Chupanids in 1353, Jalayirids in 1357 and Kara Koyunlu in 1388. Tamerlane captured this region in 1400. Qara Yusuf retook this region in 1407 from Timurid Empire. However, Shah Rukh who was Timurid ruler captured this region in 1421 and in 1429. Jahan Shah who was Kara Koyunlu ruler captured it in 1447.

=== Ottoman-Persian rule ===
Kara Koyunlu's sovereignty lasted until Uzun Hasan, ruler of Ak Koyunlu, conquered it in 1468. Ak Koyunlu's sovereignty lasted until 1501, Ismail I's conquest. Ismail I was founder of Safavid dynasty. This region was temporarily occupied by Ottoman Empire in 1514, in 1534, in 1548 and in 1553. It was then conquered by Ottoman Empire in 1585 but retaken by the Safavid ruler Abbas I of Persia who was Safavid ruler in 1603. Under the rule of Abbas I, the Armenians were resettled in Persia and ancient Armavir was finally abandoned.

The settlement remained abandoned until 1613, when seven Armenian families rebuilt a new village just 1 km east of the ancient site of Armavir.

Later, it was occupied by the Ottomans between 1635 and 1636 and renamed Ghurdughuli. At the fall of the Safavid Empire, Armavir became part of the Erivan Khanate.

=== Russian rule ===
The Russo-Persian War (1826–1828) began due to Persian demand to reconquer the territories lost to Russia between 1804 and 1813. At first, the Persians repulsed the Russians from the South Caucasus in 1826. However, Russian general and commander of the Russian army, Ivan Paskevich, reconquered South Caucasus and extended its territories to include the Erivan Khanate in 1827.

This region formally passed from Persian to Russian sovereignty after the Treaty of Turkmenchay in 1828. Armavir became the Sardarabad uyezd of the Armenian Oblast, which itself became the Erivan guberniya in 1840. This situation lasted until the February Revolution in 1917.

=== 1917 revolutions and Armenian–Ottoman War ===
After the February Revolution, the region was under the authority of the Special Transcaucasian Committee of the Russian Provisional Government and subsequently the short-lived Transcaucasian Democratic Federative Republic (TDFR). When the TDFR was dissolved in May 1918, this region passed to the Democratic Republic of Armenia, having a conspicuous role in Armenian history due to Battle of Sardarapat. There, the Armenian forces staved off extermination and repulsed the Ottoman Army whose campaign in the Caucasus was aimed at occupying Yerevan.

However, the Ottomans did occupy most of the Erivan Governorate, forcing the Armenians to sign the Treaty of Batum in June 1918. The Ottoman Army retreated after signing the Armistice of Mudros at the end of 1918 and so Armavir-Ghurdughuli returned to the Democratic Republic of Armenia in November 1918.

The village was renamed back to Armavir in 1935.

== See also ==
- Armavir Province
