= Holy Saviour's monastery of Yerazgavors =

Armenian Monastery in Turkey

Holy Saviour's monastery of Yerazgavors Երազցավորսի Սբ.Ամենափրկչի վանք
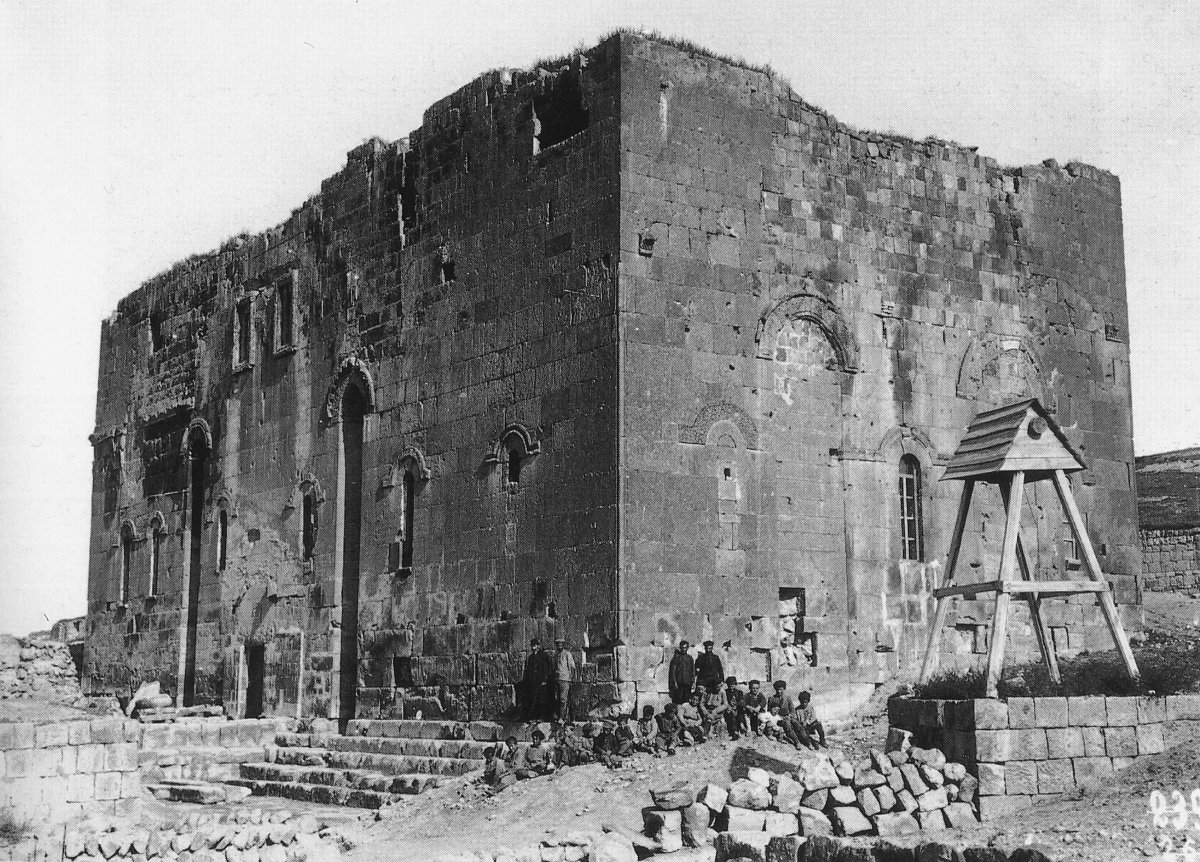
- S. Amenaprkitch Monastery

- Location within Turkey

Religion
- Affiliation: Armenian Apostolic Church
- District: Akyaka
- Province: Kars
- Region: Armenian highlands
- Ecclesiastical or organisational status: Damaged by Turks in 1920
- Status: Ceased functioning as a monastery in 1920

Location
- Location: (Turkey) Akyaka, Kars province (Armenia) Armenian highland
- State: Turkey
- Coordinates: 40.6939°N 43.7366°E

Architecture
- Type: Armenian church
- Style: Armenian
- Completed: 890 A.D.

Yerazgavorsi Surb Amenaprkitchi Vank (Holy Saviour of All) (Armenian: Երազցավորսի Սբ. Ամենափրկչի վանք) is an Armenian monastery in the village of Çetindurak (previously called Başsüregel) in the Kars Province of present-day Turkey. This corresponds to the Shirakavan settlement of Historical Armenia, also known by its older name of Yerazgavors, developed into a small town in the mid-ninth century AD. It was located about 25 km Northeast of Ani, the capital of the medieval Bagratid (Bagratuni) Armenian Kingdom and ceased functioning as a monastery in 1920 after the Armenian genocide.

== History ==
S. Amenaprkitch was commissioned by the Bagratid King Smbat I in Yerazgavors (Shirakashat) town in Shirak district of Historical Armenia's Ayrarat region. The date of construction started was probably after 892 (the year of Smbat's coronation) and 893 (when an earthquake is known to have struck the town). Catholicos Yovhanness wrote in his "History of Armenia" that the church in Shirakawan was consecrated shortly after his elevation to the patriarchal throne (which took place in 897/898), and that it was located near the royal palace. Monastery was sacked by the Seljuk Turks in the 1060s but was rebuilt during the Zakarid period at the end of the 12th century. An inscription on its walls mentioned that restoration work was undertaken between 1072 and 1081. At a later date the church was converted into a fortified tower. During this conversion the eastern niches and many of the windows were filled in, and the corners of the church were heightened. An external staircase was also added at the northern end of the west façade. The dome of the church had collapsed by the 19th century. Nikolai Marr noted the remains of the polygonal drum of the original dome. That dome had collapsed at a distant period and had been replaced by a conical dome with a smaller diameter. The replacement dome had also mostly collapsed and had been replaced by a covering of wooden beams that were, by 1913, rotten and about to fail. Marr wrote that in 1913 the building was undergoing repairs and was being converted into the village's parish church. He mentions that during those repairs the villagers had dug up many architectural fragments, but none had been recorded and most had just been reused in new buildings. He also mentions "two magnificent capitals" that had been recovered by the villagers and were now stored inside the church.
