= Noravan =

Noravan may refer to:

- Noravan, Armavir, Armenia
- Noravan, Syunik, Armenia
