= Nor Armavir =

Village in Armavir, Armenia

Nor Armavir Նոր Արմավիր
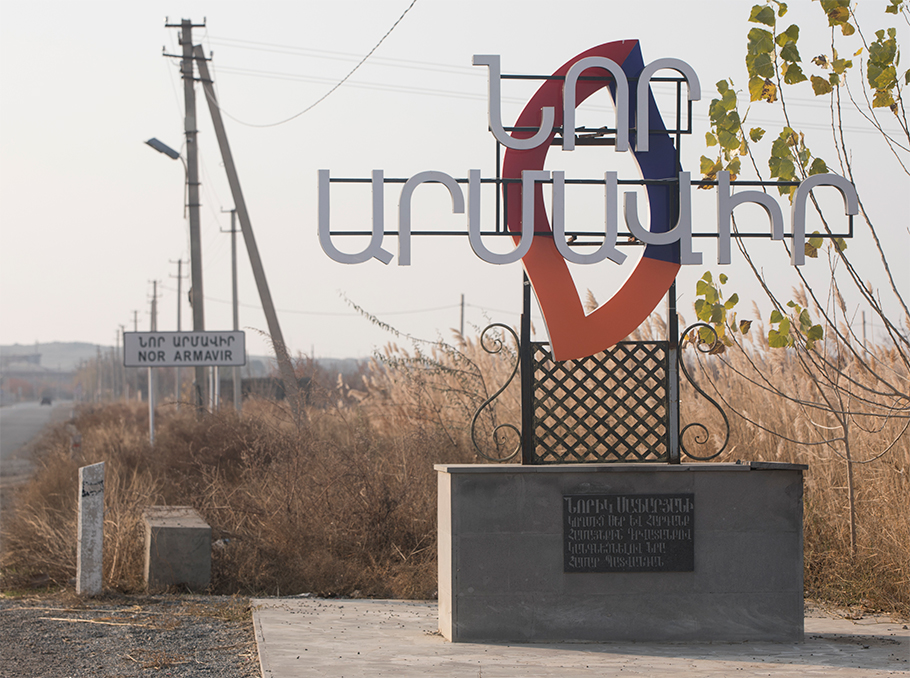

- Location within Armenia
- Coordinates: 40°05′12″N 43°59′24″E
- Country: Armenia
- Marz (Province): Armavir Province
- Founded: 1923

Population (2011)
  - Total: 1,631
- Time zone: UTC+4

Nor Armavir (Armenian: Նոր Արմավիր, meaning "New Armavir") is a village in the Armavir Province of Armenia. Founded in 1923 by Armenian refugees from Turkey, adjacent to the ancient Urartian city of Argištiḫinili. The village was named after the ancient city of Armavir, whose ruins are located 3 km west of the village. The village is known primarily for being the site of the Battle of Sardarabad during the Caucasus Campaign in 1918.

== See also ==
- Armavir Province
