= Norapat =

Village in Armavir, Armenia

Norapat Նորապատ
- Location within Armenia
- Coordinates: 40°08′N 44°01′E
- Country: Armenia
- Province: Armavir

Population (2011)
  - Total: 1,738
- Time zone: UTC+4 ( )
  - Summer (DST): UTC+5 ( )

Norapat (Armenian: Նորապատ) is a former town in the Armavir Province of Armenia. The town is now part of Armavir.

== See also ==
- Armavir Province
