= Historical capitals of Armenia =

External image
- Armenian capital cities on a regional map

This article lists the historic and present capitals of Armenia.

| # | City | Period | Years | Duration, years |
|---|---|---|---|---|
| 1 | Sugunia | Kingdom of Ararat | 860 BC–858 BC | 2 |
| 2 | Arzashkun | Kingdom of Ararat | 858 BC–850s BC | 1-8 |
| 3 | Tushpa (Van) | Kingdom of Ararat | 832 BC–590 BC | 242 |
| 4 | Armavir | Orontid dynasty | 331–210 BC | 121 |
| 5 | Yervandashat | Orontid dynasty and Artaxiad dynasty | 210–176 BC | 34 |
| 6 | Artaxata (Artashat) | Artaxiad dynasty | 176–77 BC and 69 BC–120 AD | 99 and 189 |
| 7 | Tigranocerta (Tigranakert) | Artaxiad dynasty | 77–69 BC | 8 |
| 8 | Vagharshapat | Arsacid dynasty | 120–330 | 210 |
| 9 | Dvin | Arsacid dynasty | 336–428 | 92 |
| 10 | Bagaran | Bagratid (Bagratuni) period | 885–890 | 5 |
| 11 | Shirakavan | Bagratid (Bagratuni) period | 890–929 | 39 |
| 12 | Kars | Bagratid (Bagratuni) period | 929–961 | 32 |
| 13 | Ani | Bagratid (Bagratuni) period | 961–1045 | 84 |
| 14 | Tarsus | Armenian Principality of Cilicia | 1080–1198 | 118 |
| 15 | Sis | Armenian Kingdom of Cilicia | 1198–1375 | 177 |
| 16 | Yerevan | Republic of Armenia (1918–1920); Armenian Soviet Socialist Republic (1920–1991); Republic of Armenia (since 1991) | 1918–present | 108 |
| 16–17 | Stepanakert | NKAO (1921–1991); Artsakh (1991–2023) | 1921–2023 | 101 |

== See also ==
- List of cities and towns in Armenia
- Municipalities of Armenia
