= Argištiḫinili =

Archaeological site in Armenia

Coordinates: 40.1025°N 43.9883°E

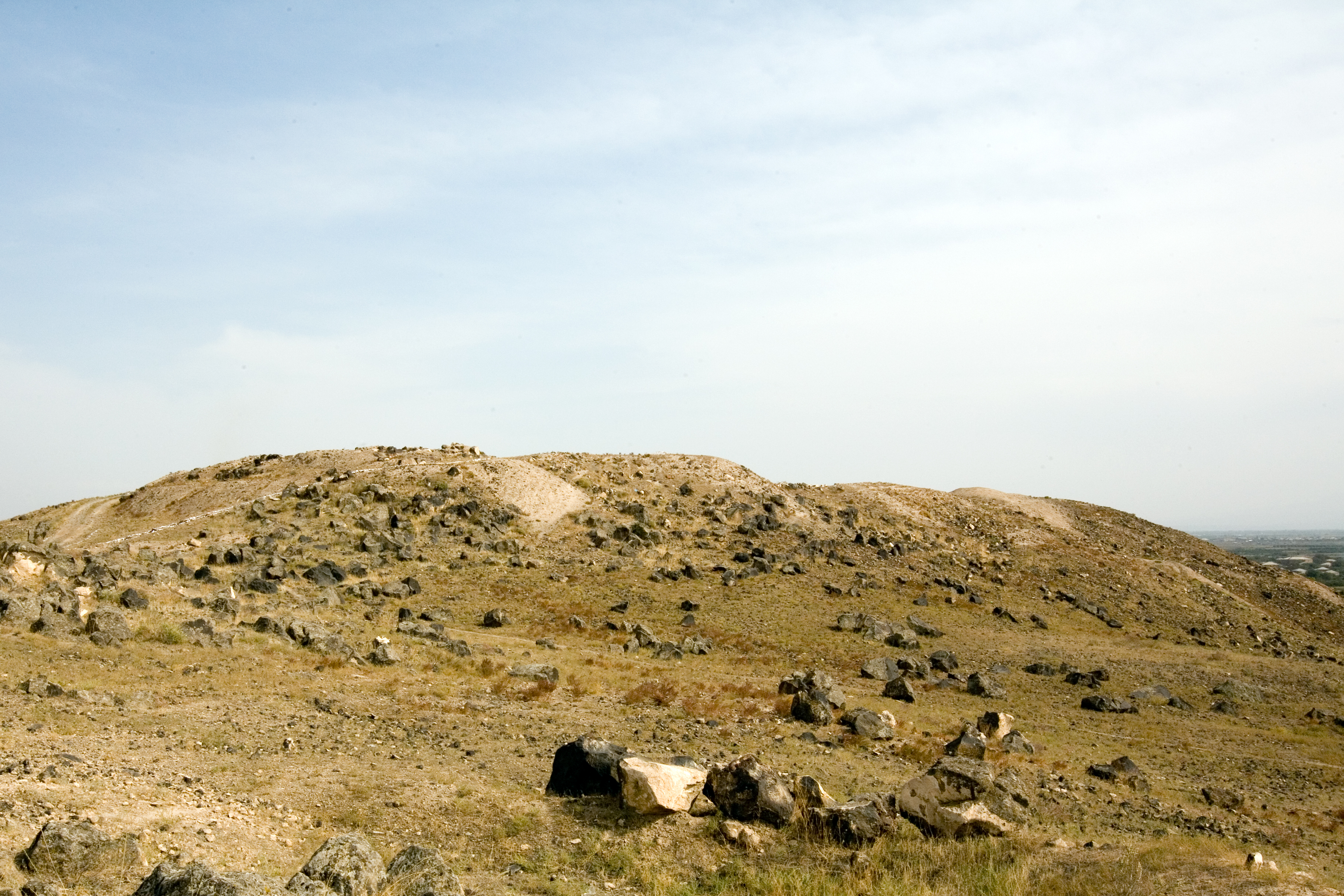
View of mound above the ruins of Argištiḫinili

Argištiḫinili (Urartian: 𒅈𒄀𒅖𒋾𒄭𒉌𒇷) was a town in the ancient kingdom of Urartu, established during the expansion of the Urartians in the Transcaucasus under their king Argishti I, and named in his honour. It lasted between the 8th and 6th centuries BC. The ruins of the Argištiḫinili fortifications are 15 kilometres (9 mi) southwest of the present-day town of Armavir, Armenia, between the villages of Nor-Armavir and Armavir in the Armenian marz of Armavir. The town was founded on the left bank of the middle reaches of the Aras River. Over the centuries, the river channel has shifted to several kilometres south of the town.

== History of studies ==
The historiography of Argištiḫinili is intimately tied with that of old Armavir, one of the capitals of Armenia. Moses of Chorene has written in his History of Armenia of the founding of Armavir by Aramais, grandson of Hayk, the legendary ancestor of the Armenians. Old Armavir, as was demonstrated by archaeological digs in the 20th century, was located atop the erstwhile Argištiḫinili from the 4th century BC onwards. In the 1830s, the Swiss traveller Marie-Frédéric Dubois de Montpéreux had suggested that a mound near the village of Nor Armavir could be the ancient fortress of Armavir. Interest in the site increased with the discovery in 1869 of cuneiform tablets, which turned out to date from the time of Argishti I and Rusa III. In 1880, excavations at the Armavir hill began, conducted by imperial Russian archaeologists ahead of the Fifth Russian Archaeological Congress at Tiflis.

In 1896, the Russian Assyriologist M.V. Nikolsky conjectured that beneath the ruins of Armavir is an even more ancient Urartian township. This was confirmed by later excavations.

Owing to World War I and the Armenian genocide, systematic investigations at Armavir began only in 1927, under the leadership of Nicholas Marr. Between 1944 and 1970, the academics Boris Piotrovsky, Giorgi Melikishvili and Igor M. Diakonoff conducted researches at Argištiḫinili. Their translations of Urartian texts contributed enormously to the understanding of Urartu in general, and Argištiḫinili in particular. Between 1962 and 1971, there were two simultaneous digs at the Argištiḫinili mound under the aegis of the Armenian Institute of Archaeology: one, investigating the remains of ancient Argištiḫinili, was led by A.A. Martirosyan, while the other investigated old Armavir.

== Founding ==
Urartian documents indicate that Argištiḫinili was founded in 776 BC following the command of Argishti I, in the eleventh year of his reign. The establishment of the town was preceded by a long-term Urartian expansion into the Transcaucasus, which was aimed at controlling the fertile Ararat plain. From about 786 BC, the first year of his reign, Argishti I had begun a series of raids into the Ararat plain, the Akhurian River valley and Lake Sevan. In 782 BC, he founded the fortress of Erebuni on the site of modern Yerevan as a base for military operations.

The expansion into the Ararat plain was briefly interrupted by minor clashes with the Assyrians at the south-western frontier of Urartu. During Argishti's reign, Urartu was the zenith of its powers, and was able to easily overcome the armies of its neighbours, including the Assyrians. After four years of warfare, Argishti was able to occupy the Ararat plain, and by 776 BC was able to found a town in the middle of the valley. This appears to have been part of Argishti's grand plan to have a fortress on each corner of the Ararat Plain.

According to archaeologists, Argištiḫinili was intended to be an administrative centre rather than a military base, as from a military standpoint, its location was less than optimal. Argishti was then able to control the metalworking area of Metsamor.

According to the chronicles of Argishti I, Argištiḫinili was constructed in the land of the Azzi (or the Aza), and indeed, archaeological digs have demonstrated Bronze Age remains dating between the 3rd and the 1st millennia BC. No documents pertaining to the Urartian campaigns against the Azzi survive; it is conjectured that following years of warfare in the Ararat Plain, the inhabitants of Azzi may have abandoned their township before its occupation by the Urartians.

Urartian inscriptions on the foundation of Argištiḫinili
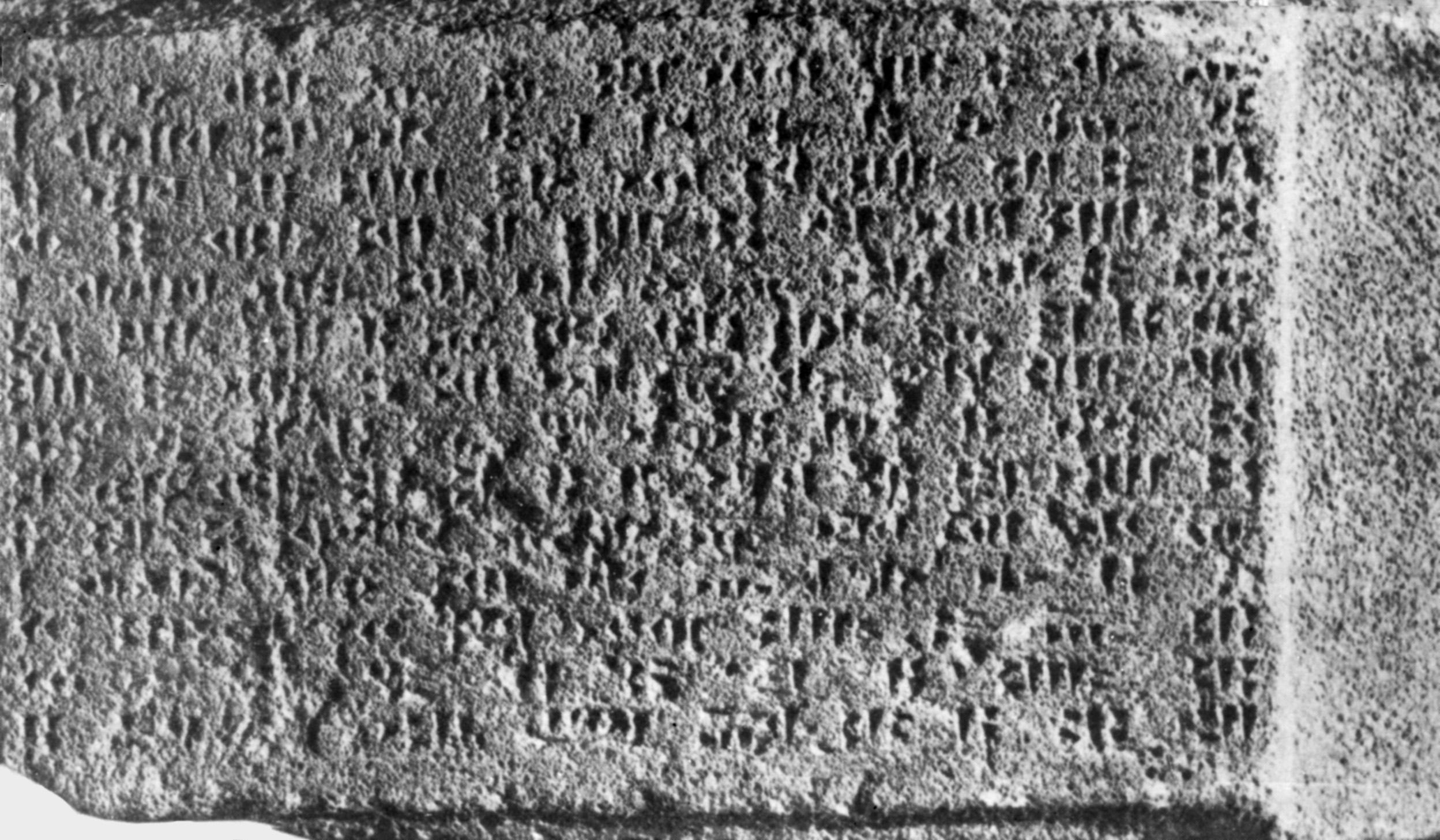
Translation: Argishti son of Menua, speaks. I built a majestic fortress and gave it a name from my own, Argishtiḫinili. The land was wilderness: nothing was built there. Out of the rivers I built four canals; the vineyards and the orchards were divided. I have accomplished the deeds there...Argishti, son of Menua, mighty King, great King, King of Biainili, ruler of Tushpa.

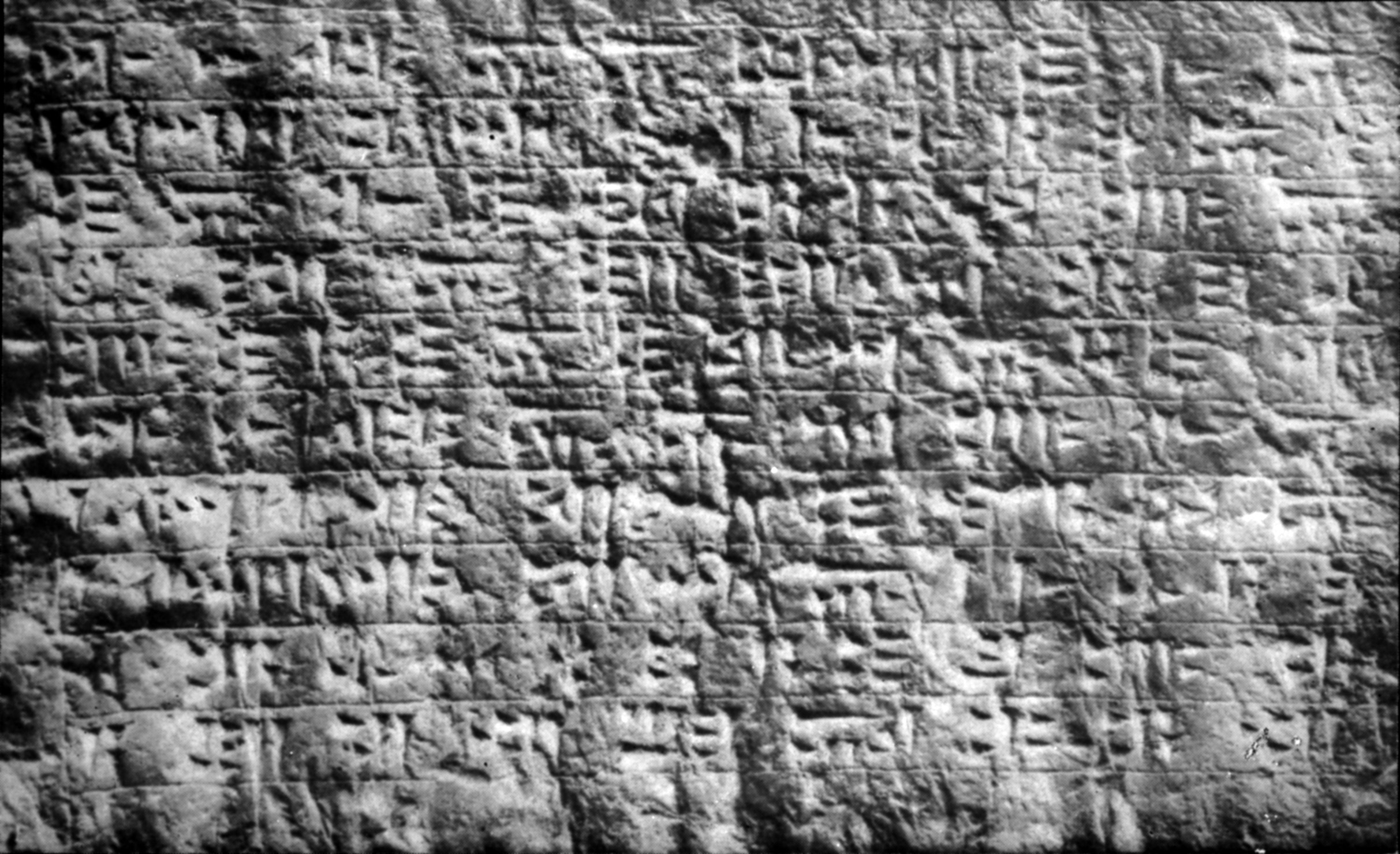
Translation: Through the greatness of the God Ḫaldi, Argishti, son of Menua, built this canal. The land was uninhabited, no one was to be found here. By the grace of Ḫaldi Argishti made this canal. Argishti son of Menua, mighty King, great King, King of Bianiili, ruler of Tushpa.

== Town plan ==
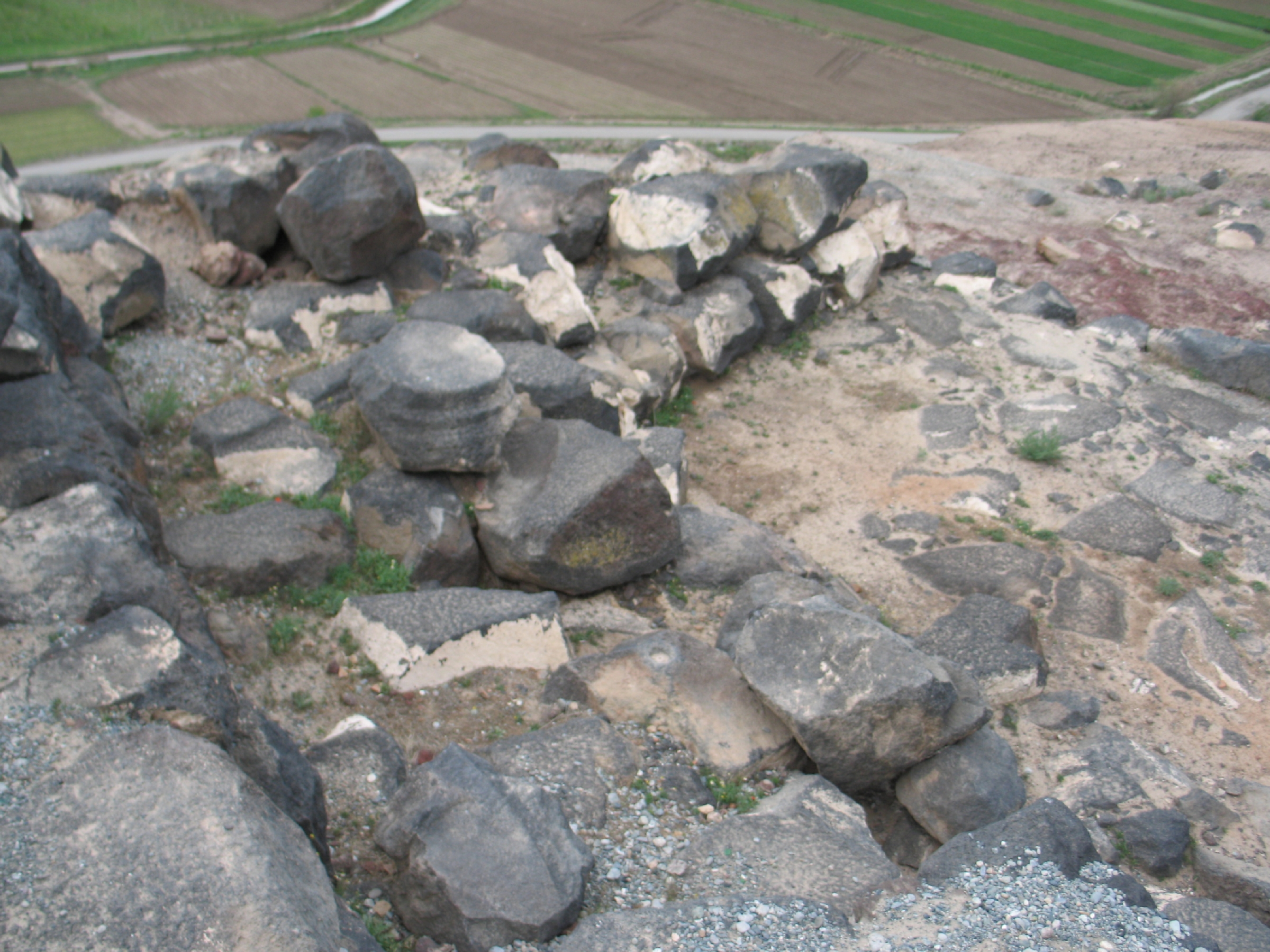
Ruins on the hilltop

The town of Argištiḫinili occupied an elongated rectangular area with dimensions of about 5 by 2 kilometres (3.1 by 1.2 mi). It was between the western outskirts of Nor Armavir and the central part of the village of Armavir. Along the eastern and western sides of the rectangle were powerful fortifications made of stone. The western edge was a long ridge, while the eastern flank was situated on a basalt outcrop. Parallel to the longer sides of the rectangle were the irrigation canals ordered by Argishti I. Various town buildings have been found scattered across the local hills, situated within the economic zone of Argištiḫinili, the total area of which was about 1,000 hectares (2,500 acres). The total length of the irrigation canals is no less than 40 kilometres (25 mi). Argištiḫinili was possibly the largest Urartian city in Armenia.

Buildings in Argištiḫinili included palaces, temples and dwellings, which were continued to be used without much change into the post-Urartian period.

Argishti I's network of irrigation canals, constructed between the Aras and its tributary the Kasakh, is contemporaneous with the town itself. Several canals visible to this day. Their construction required the excavation of about 160,000 cubic metres (5,700,000 cu ft) of earth, while the fortifications needed over 40,000 cubic metres (1,400,000 cu ft) of basalt. Archaeologists believe that prisoners were used as forced labour in the construction of both the canals and the fortress.

Location of Argištiḫinili Records of Nor-Armavir Archaeological Expedition.
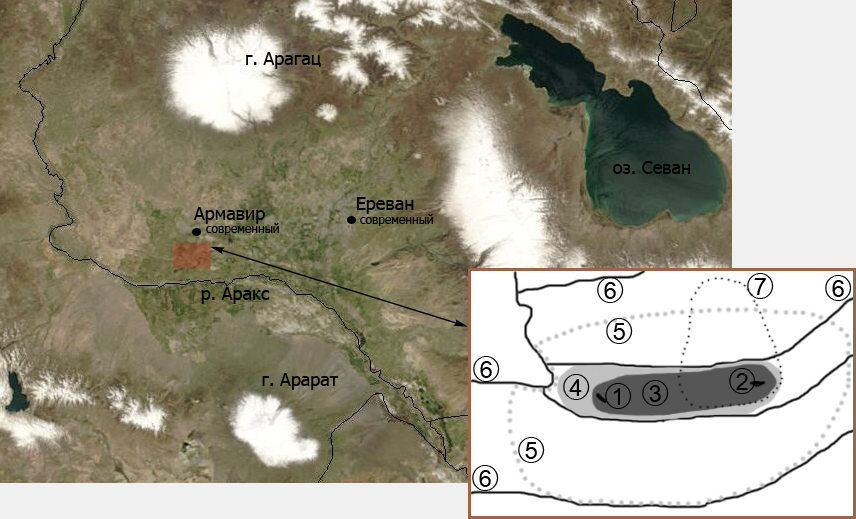
Numbers: 1. Western fortification (on a mound near Nor-Armavir); 2. Eastern fortification (on a mound by Armavir); 3. Inner town 4. Outer town 5. Approximate boundary of Argishtikinili farmland.; 6. Irrigation canals.; 7. Borders of old Armavir, built on the ruins of Argishtikinili, about 200 years after its fall.

The city was apparently more important for its administrative and economic control over the Ararat Plain. Indeed, it was the northern administrative and cultural capital of Urartu. Argištiḫinili's administrators oversaw the construction of the irrigation canals and regulated the distribution of economic goods in the region. Within the fortifications have been found large storage areas for wine and grains, as well as homes of civil servants and the military.

Following Argishti I, his son Sarduri II was also active in Argištiḫinili, constructing places of worship and greatly expanding the fortifications.

=== Fortifications ===
Unlike many other Urartian cities, Argištiḫinili was not located at an elevation, and thus its military value was small. The low flat hills upon which the town was built did not allow such mighty fortresses as protected Tushpa, Erebuni, Rusaḫinili or Teišebaini. However, to protect itself from unorganised attack, walls in the classic Urartian pattern were constructed along the mounds surrounding it. These were of mud brick atop a foundation of massive basalt blocks. The facade of the walls was divided by buttresses, and at each corner of the fortress there was a massive tower.

Remains of basalt foundations of the Argištiḫinili fortification After archaeological works in the 1970s.
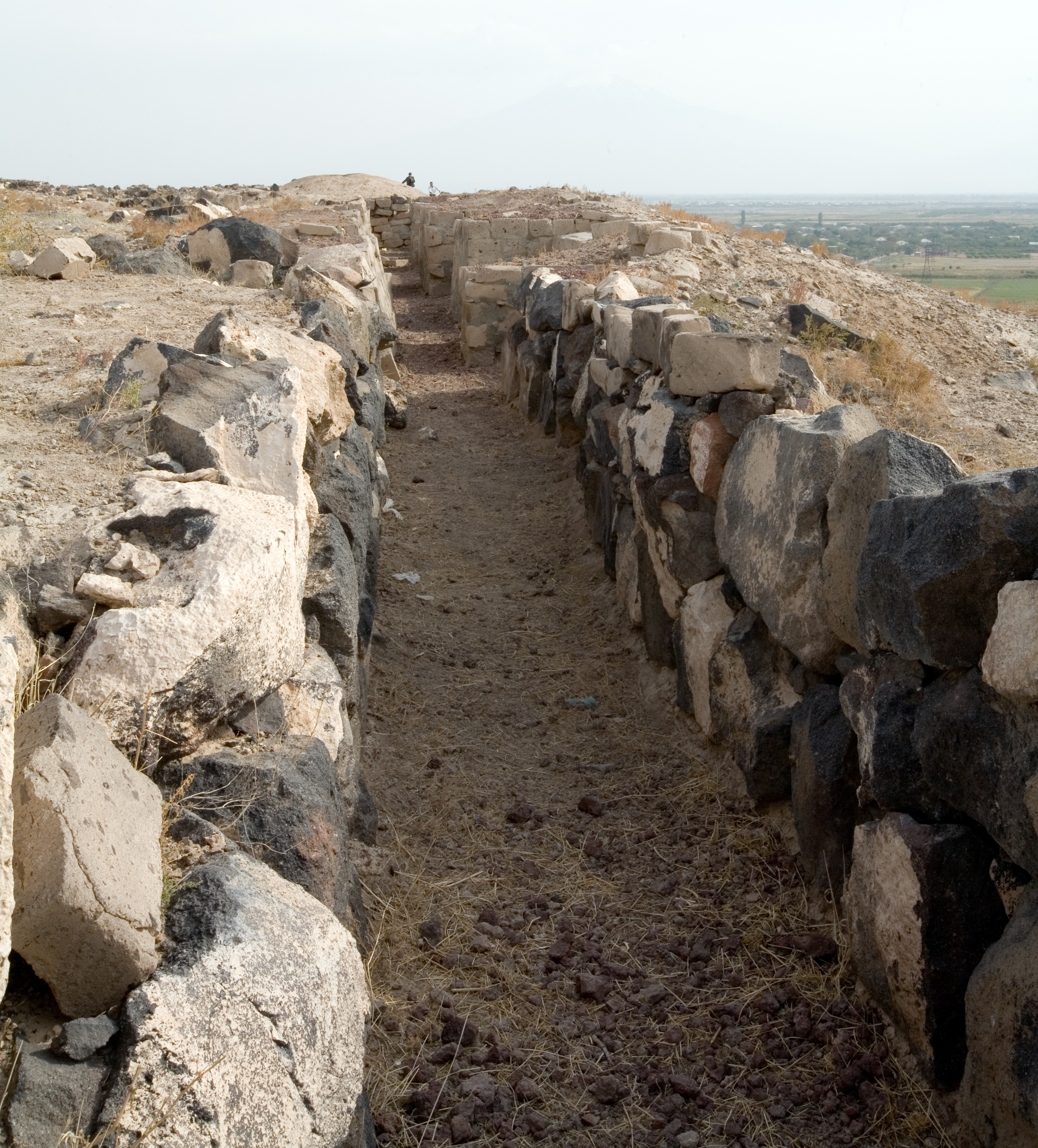

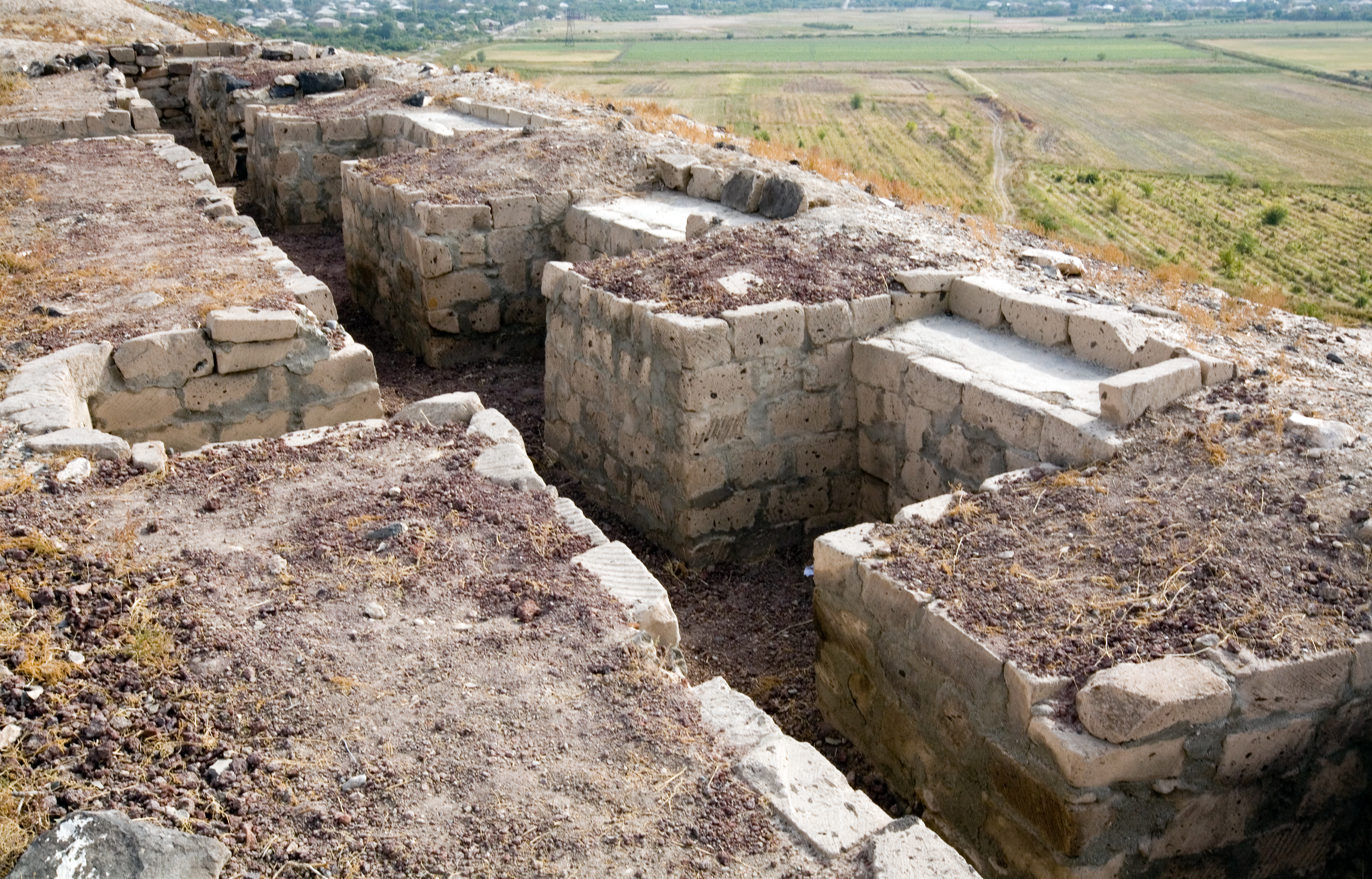

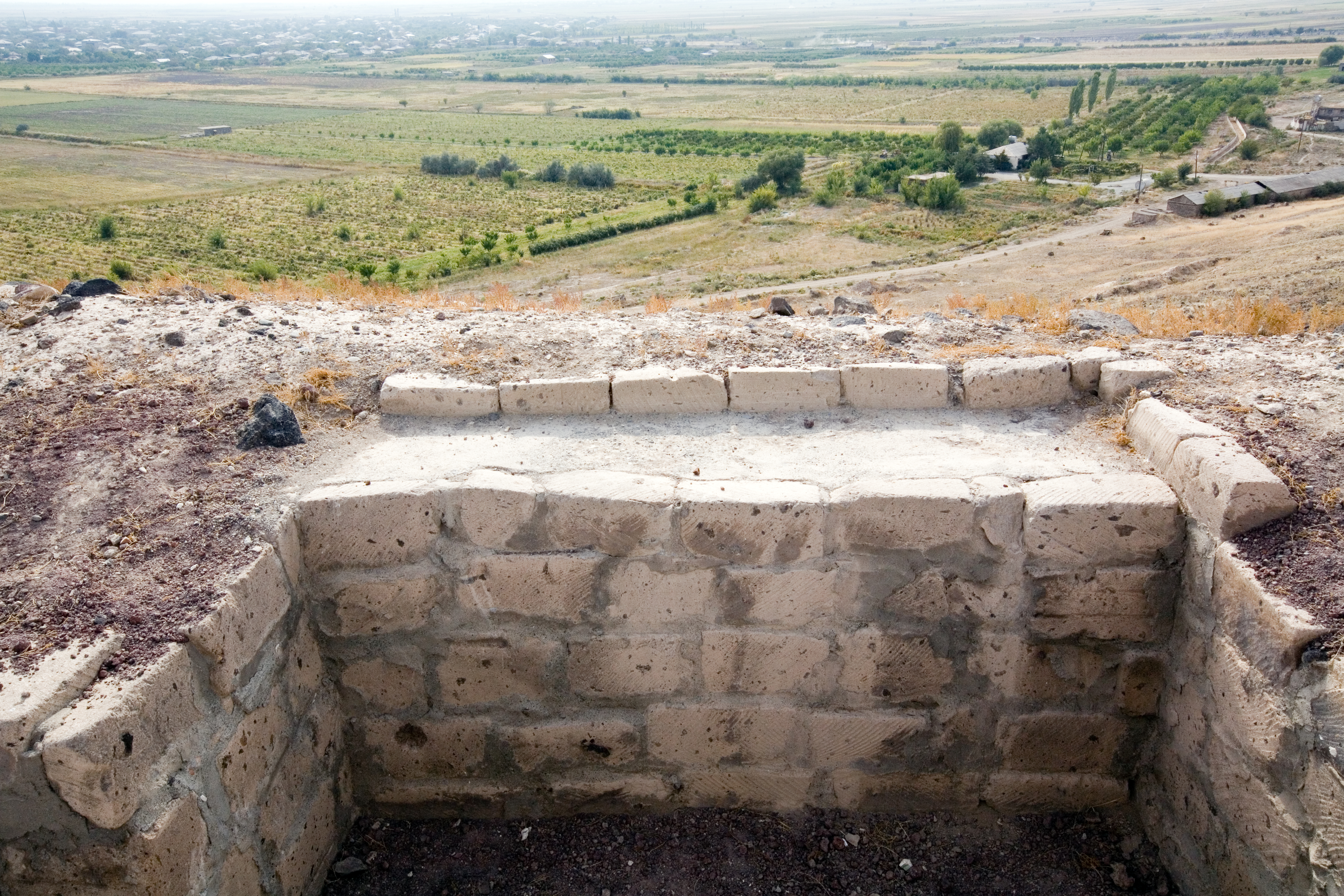

The better excavated western fortifications are on biggest of five elevations comprising the Hills of David. Their entrance was to the north on a packed mud ramp. The fortress comprised three units, each consisting of small rooms spread out around a central yard. Movement between the units was ostensibly regulated, given the narrow single paths that connected them, whereas within a unit, movement was free.

=== Agriculture ===
On the fertile lands of the Ararat Plain, wheat and other grains were cultivated. Vineyards and wineries were an important occupation. Archaeologists estimate that the granaries at Argištiḫinili could store at least 5000 tonnes of produce, while the state-sponsored cultivation of grain crops occupied nearly 5,000 hectares (12,000 acres) of land. The wine stores of the city could hold about 160,000 litres (42,000 US gal), implying the use of about 1,250 hectares (3,100 acres) of vineyards. In addition, many citizens owned their own plots of land. There are also preserved remains of domestic animals, such as poultry and pigs.

=== Crafts ===
Many stone and clay manufactures have been found at Argištiḫinili, mainly for agricultural use. General- and special-purpose ovens were built of stone, as were grain mills of various types. Clay pots (karases) were used for the storage of various products such as flour and wine, which were regularly traded with neighbouring countries. Wine storage demanded huge pots which were partially buried into the ground.

Metalwork was heavily developed in Argištiḫinili. Numerous articles of iron and bronze have been discovered - agricultural implements, weapons, armour, jewelry, and so on. Archaeologists have also discovered stone and ceramic moulds for the casting of metal.

Household products in Argištiḫinili Ethnographic Museum of Armenia, Armavir
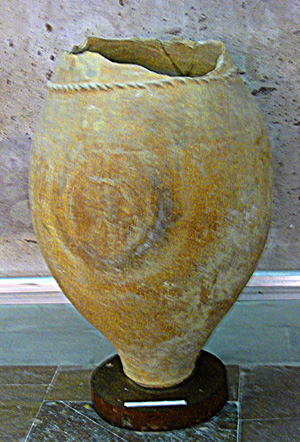

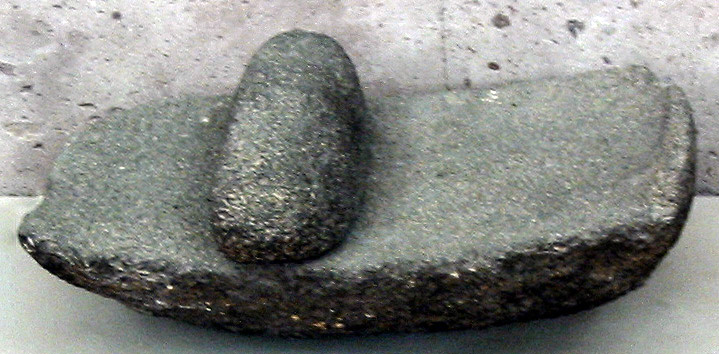

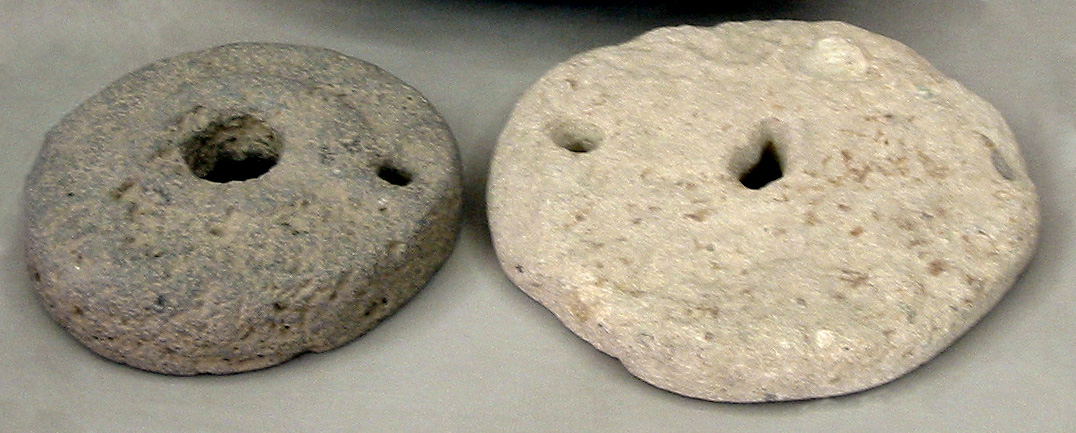

Above: stone mills for grinding wheat into flour. On the left is a handheld tool, on the right is an industrial version. Left: a Karas, or clay-pot, found at a vine-vault at Argištiḫinili. Karases were dug into the ground to about 80% of their height; the buried parts of the pots have survived better than their exposed necks. In such karases were stored nearly 160,000 litres of wine at Argištiḫinili.

The agricultural vessels appear in various types and sizes, with swollen or stretched trunks, and with design patterns such as chariots.

Beer vessels with short necks and elongated trunks, clay censers, cheese-making vats, and jugs of various shapes have also been found. The jugs have been decorated with house fronts, geometric patterns, or leaf-shaped folds.

Other items include lamps, cups, phials, interment urns, and medical karases with lids. Ceremonial (religious) vessels have been found in Argištiḫinili, decorated with triangles, zigzag lines, or with stylised pictures of bird or dragon heads.

== During the Urartian decline ==
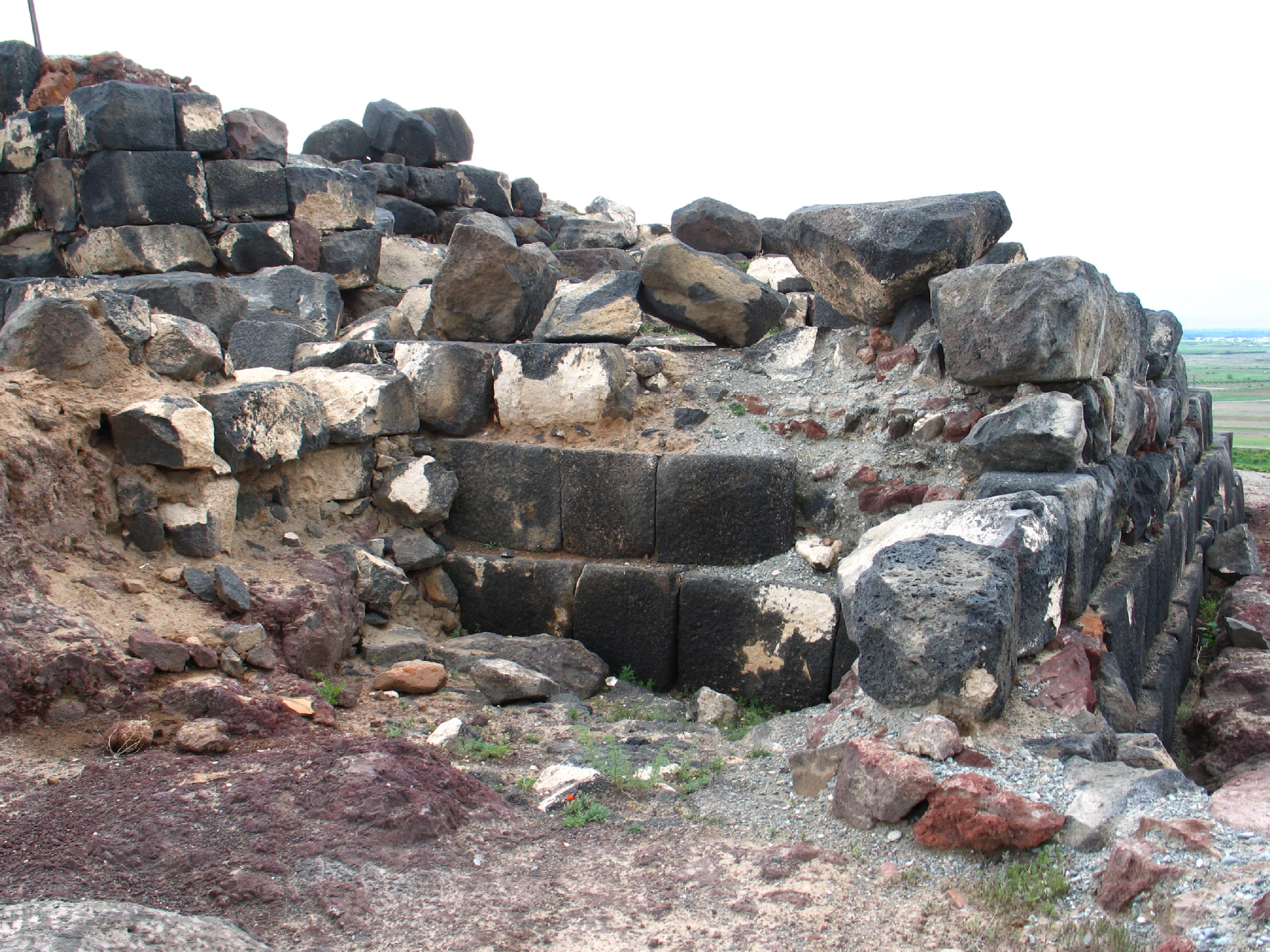
Ruins of the temple

The Assyrian defeat of the Urartian king Sarduri II began the decline of the Urartian kingdom. The next Urartian king Rusa I was unable to withstand the Assyrians either, and after a terrible defeat at the hands of Sargon II, killed himself. During his invasion of Urartu in 714 BC, Sargon dealt a serious blow to the Urartian religion, with his destruction of its chief god Ḫaldi's shrine at Musasir. The intensive construction that characterised the reigns of previous kings of Urartu slowed down severely, with some amount of building work continuing only in the Transcaucasus. In Argištiḫinili, building inscriptions from the reigns of Rusa II (son of Argishti II, ruled 685–639 BC) and Rusa III (son of Erimena, ruled c. 605–595 BC) have been found. Rusa II, intending to restore the glory of the cult of Ḫaldi, constructed similar temples at Argištiḫinili, Erebuni and Teišebaini, decorated with identical inscriptions that reinforce the Urartian gods by including the Babylonian god Marduk:

In the new temple, let a goat be slaughtered to the god Ḫaldi, let a bull be sacrificed to the god Ḫaldi, a sheep to the god Teisheba, a sheep to the god Shivini, a cow to the goddess Arubani, a sheep to the armour of the god Ḫaldi, a sheep to the gates of the god Ḫaldi, a sheep to the god Iuarsha... ...I made all this. Rusa, son of Argishti says: He who destroys this stele, he who profanes it, he who steals it, he who buries it in the earth, ... he who proclaims "It is I who carried out these works", and who replaces his own in place of my name, may he be destroyed by the gods Ḫaldi, Teisheba, Shivini, Marduk; may there not be either his name nor his family under the sun...

Under Rusa II, much attention was lavished on the fortress of Teišebaini; indeed, treasures from lesser towns, including Argištiḫinili, were transferred there.

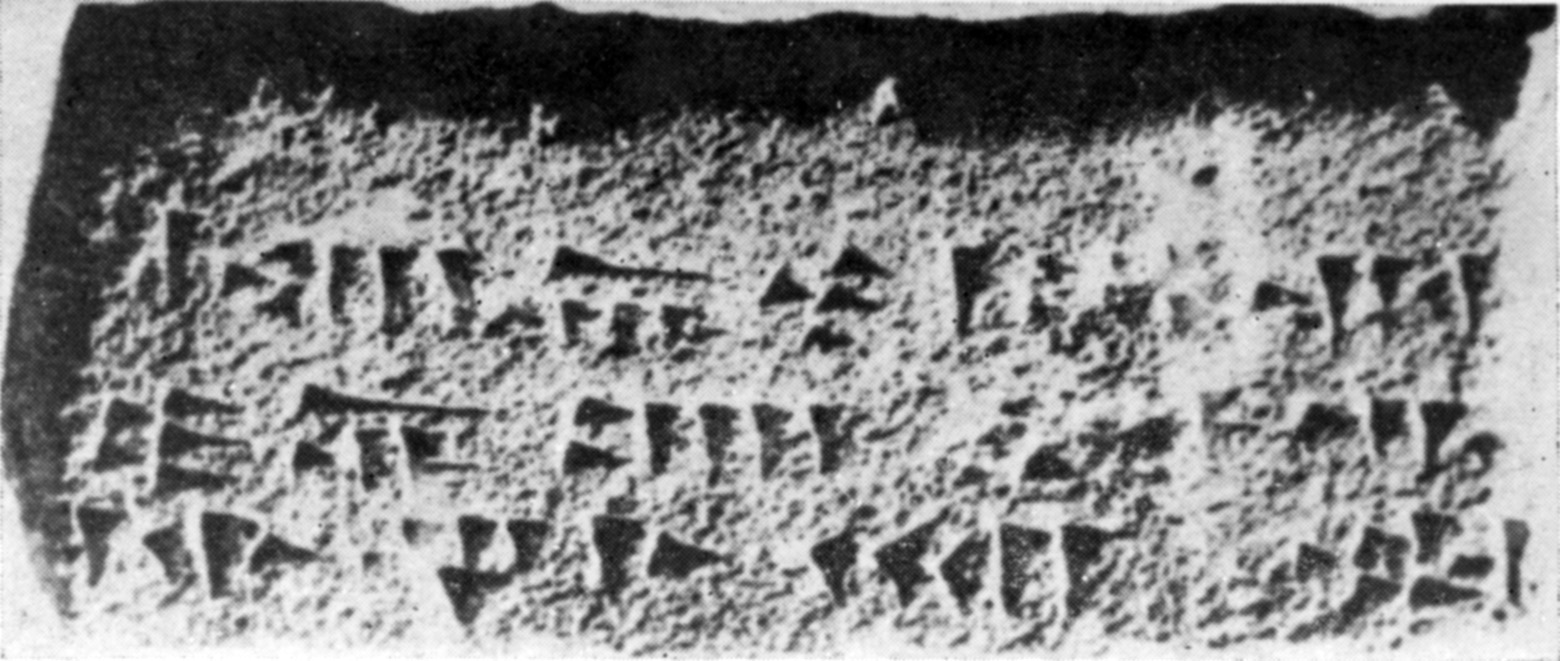
Fragment of Urartian cuneiform inscription of Rusa III of a granary at Argištiḫinili

Rusa II attempted to stem the decline of Urartu but was largely unsuccessful. A new granary, mentioned in an inscription by king Rusa III, was probably the large major building works in Argištiḫinili. Shortly thereafter, civilians and the army appear to have abandoned the fortress of Erebuni (at the time the main military centre in the Ararat Plain) on tactical grounds, and joined the main forces at the great fortress of Teishebiani, thereby putting Argištiḫinili at risk of attack. Indeed, around 600 BC, this town was captured and torched. Archaeologists have discovered evidence of assault weapons, major conflagration and extensive deaths of residents. Argištiḫinili was probably destroyed by the Scythians or the Medes, and thus lasted fewer than 200 years.

== Current status ==
After the completion of excavations under the leadership of A. A. Martirosyan in the 1970s, Argištiḫinili was conserved with the major digs being covered up with earth. Some of the fortifications and foundations were strengthened and surface-cleaned. On the Argištiḫinili mound, a memorial stone was posted along with a plan of the town during its heyday. Most of the artefacts found in Argištiḫinili were transferred to the Sardarapat Ethnographic Museum of Armenia.

Museum buildings on the Argištiḫinilimound
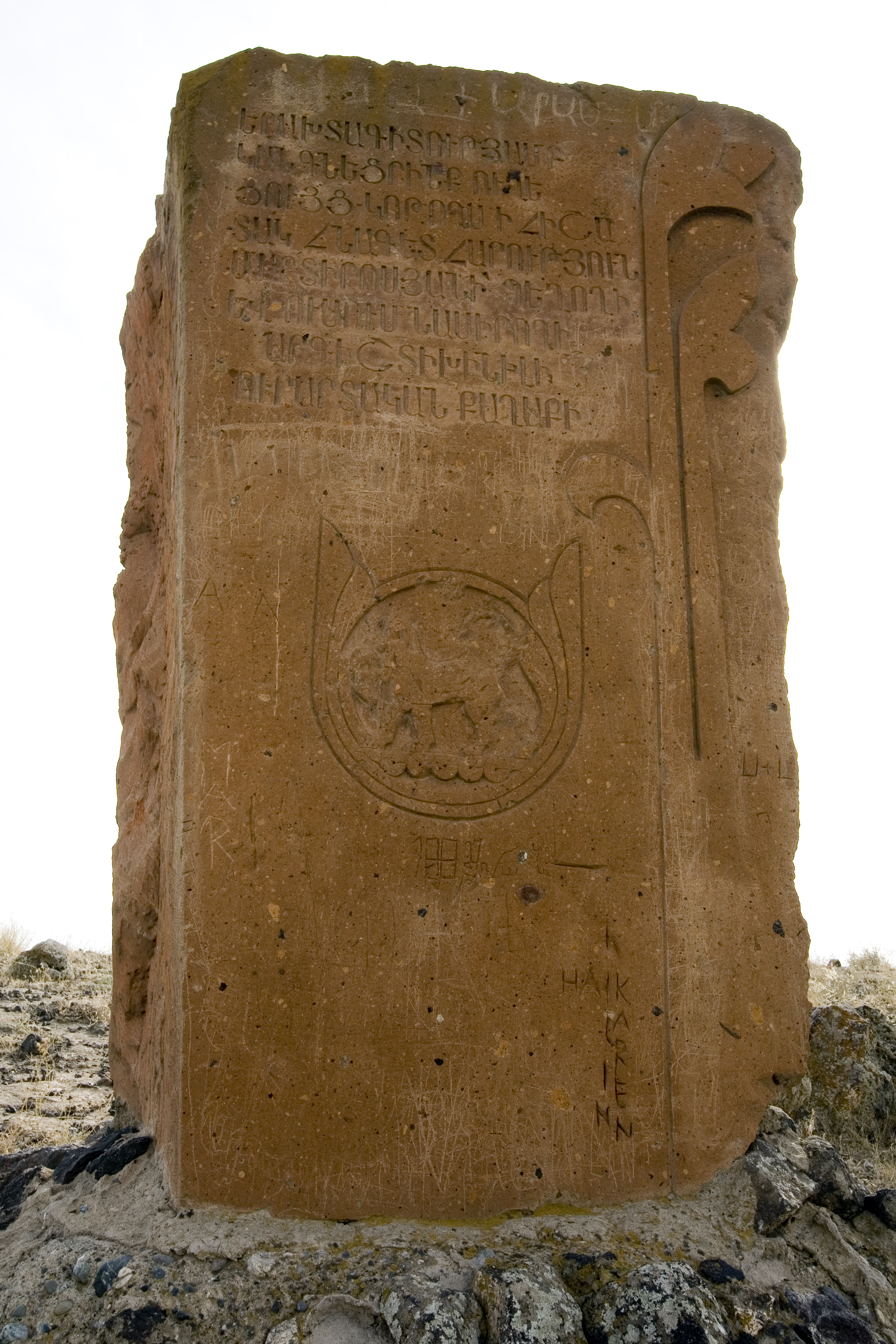
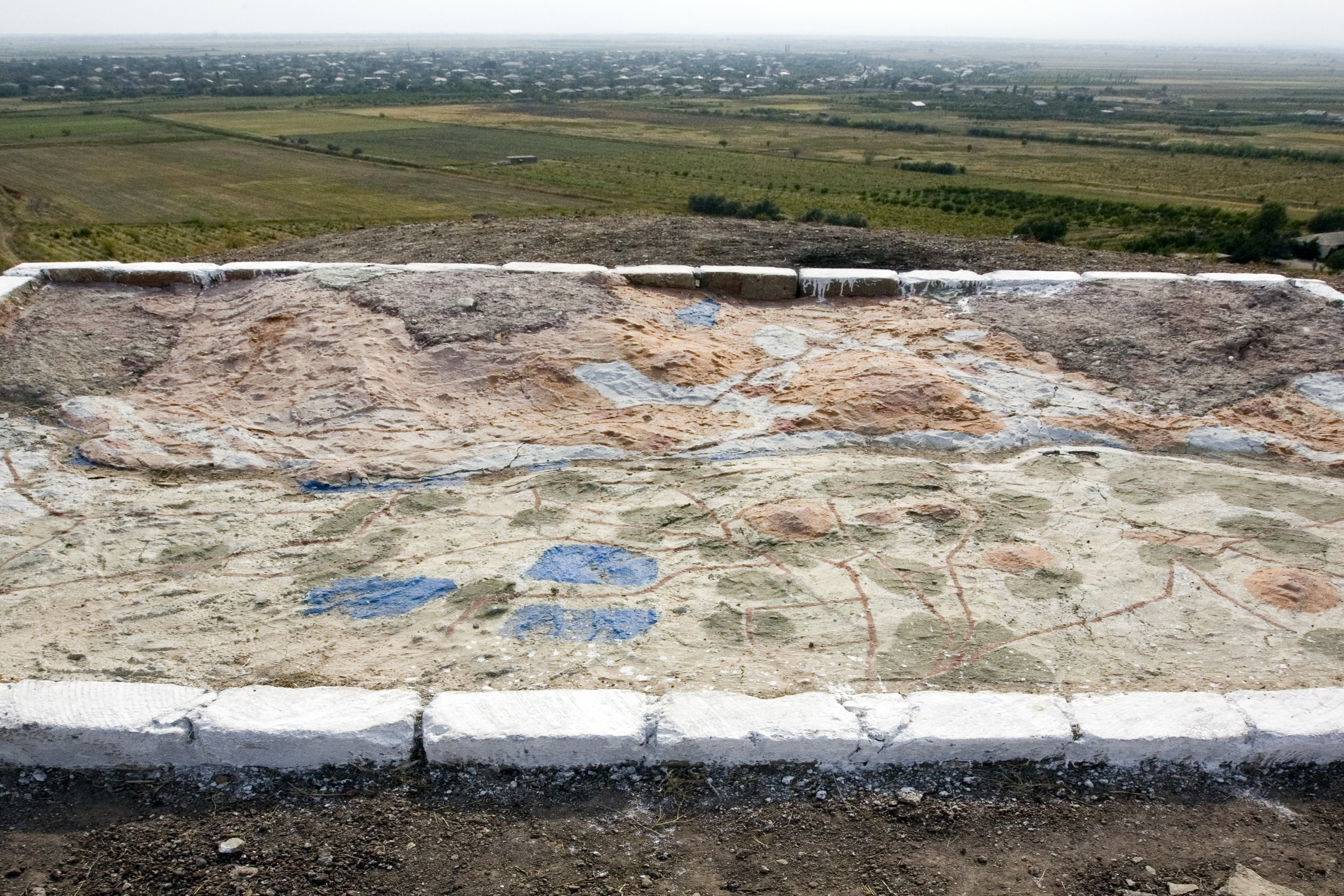
Left: memorial stele of Argishti I. Above: plan of Argištiḫinili during its heyday.
