= Noravan, Armavir =

Village in Armavir, Armenia

Noravan Նորավան
- Location within Armenia
- Coordinates: 40°10′N 44°02′E
- Country: Armenia
- Marz (Province): Armavir

Population (2011)
  - Total: 994
- Time zone: UTC+4 ( )
  - Summer (DST): UTC+5 ( )
- Website: https://www.facebook.com/pages/Noravan-Armavir/103406199691610

Noravan (Armenian: Նորավան) is a town in the Armavir Province of Armenia. It is home to the Noravan Agriculture Association.

== Infrastructure ==
In 2012 the World Bank funded a road improvement in the area. Also in 2012, the Prime Minister Tigran Sargsyan visited the area to see irrigation infrastructure works. The Irrigation System Rehabilitation Works are partly funded by the World Bank.

== Noravan forest ==
There have been accusations that Noravan forest was sold by the regional administration to corrupt officials in a sham auction, without informing the people who formerly rented the land. The buyers then resold the land for a substantial profit.

== Noravan Municipality ==
The local government for the town is the Noravan Municipality, the head of community for the municipality is Arthur Mikayelyan. Arthur Mikayelyan was awarded gold medals for agricultural achievements by the minister of agriculture Sergo Karapetyan in 2014.

== See also ==
- Armavir Province
