= Armavir (ancient city) =

Ancient city in Armenia

- Արմաւիր (Old Armenian)
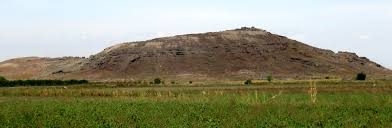
- The site of ancient Armavir

- Location within Armenia
- 40°04′55″N 44°02′00″E
- Location: 1 km west of the current village of Armavir, Armavir Province, Armenia

History
- Built: 8th century BC rebuilt 331 BC
- Built by: King Orontes III
- Abandoned: 1603

Armavir (Old Armenian: Արմաւիր; also called Armaouira in antiquity) was a large commercial city and the capital of ancient Armenia during the reign of the Orontid dynasty. Its ruins are located 1 kilometer west of the modern Armenian village of Armavir.

== History ==
=== Antiquity ===
The area of ancient Armavir has been inhabited since the 6th millennium BC. Various obsidian instruments, bronze objects and pottery have been found from that period. Armenian accounts held the city to have founded by King Aramais, a grandson of Hayk, around 1980 BC.

During the first half of the 8th century BC, King Argishti I of Urartu built a fortress in the area and named it Argishtikhinili. In 331 BC, when Armenia under the Orontid dynasty asserted its independence from the Achaemenid Empire, Armavir was chosen as the capital of Armenia. Slabs of clay have been found from the Achaemenid period written in the Elamite language concerning episodes of the Gilgamesh epic. Various inscriptions in Hellenistic Greek carved around the third century BC, have been found, including poetry from Hesiod, lines from Euripides, a list of Macedonian months, and names of Orontid Kings.

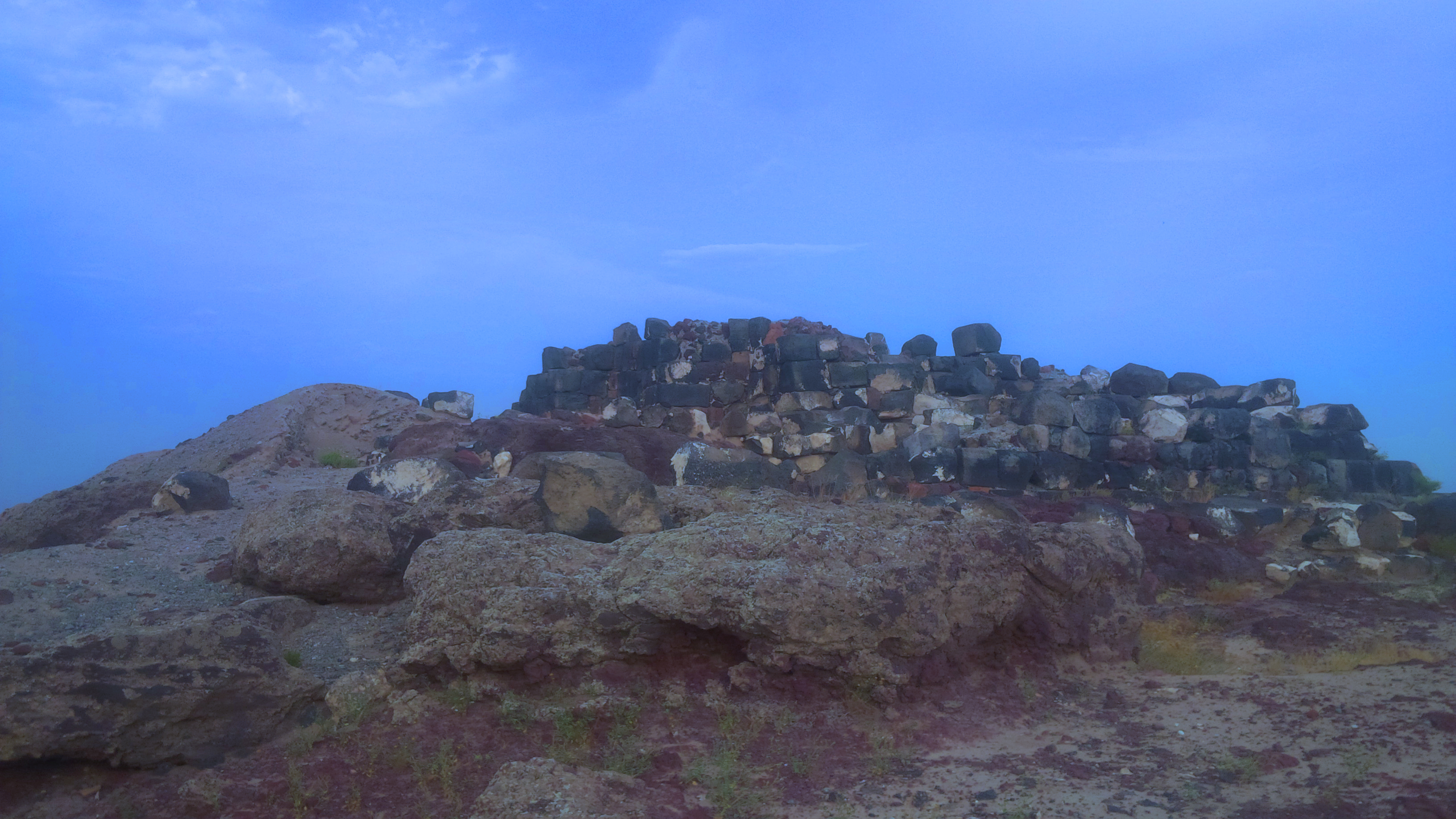
The remains at the archaeological site of ancient Armavir

According to the 5th-century Armenian historian Movses Khorenatsi, Armavir was the first capital of the Kingdom of Armenia (although, from a geographical standpoint, the first capital of Armenia was Van). Movses' history preserves a tradition that when King Valarsace the Parthian settled in Armavir (ca. 149 BC), he built a temple there and asked prince aspet (knight) Smbat of the Bagratuni dynasty to give up his religion and worship idols. But Smbat refused to comply. Movses also relates that when King Tigranes II (whom he places on the throne from 90 to 36 BC), in order to take revenge on Queen Cleopatra of Egypt, sent an expedition to Palestine, he carried a great number of Jews into captivity, and settled them in Armavir and in Vardges. Movses goes on to state that later Jews were transferred from Armavir to Yervandashat, and under King Artashes I, were again transferred into the new capital Artashat. When King Sapor II of Persia invaded Armenia (360–370), he led away from Artashat 30,000 Armenian and 9,000 Jewish families, the latter brought by King Tigranes from Judea, and then completely destroyed the city.

In 591 during the reign of emperor Maurice, Armavir (then called Armaouira) and much of Armenia came under Roman administration after the Romans defeated the Sassanid Persian Empire at the battle of the Blarathon.

During Antiquity, Armavir was taken by the Seleucids, Parthians, Roman Empire, Sassanids and Byzantine Empire before it was taken over by the Arabs in 645.

=== Medieval Armavir ===
Arab rule lasted until the first quarter of the ninth century. The Sajids managed this region in the 9th century. After that, the Armenian Bagratuni dynasty returned this city under Armenian control (Bagratuni Armenia). The Byzantine Empire reconquered this region in 1045 but lost it to the Seljuk Turks in 1064, who renamed the city Sardarabad. This region was changed hands between Armenians, Georgians, Eldiguzids and the Khwarezmid Empire after the Seljuks' decline. The Mongols captured this region in 1239 and founded Ilkhanid state in 1256. This region came under the control of the Chupanids in 1353, the Jalayirids in 1357 and the Kara Koyunlu in 1388. Tamerlane captured this region in 1400. Qara Yusuf retook this region in 1407 from Timurid Empire. However Shah Rukh who was a Timurid ruler captured this region in 1421 and in 1429. Jahan Shah who was a Kara Koyunlu ruler captured it in 1447.

=== Ottoman-Persian rule ===
Kara Koyunlu's sovereignty lasted until Uzun Hasan, ruler of Ak Koyunlu, conquered it in 1468. Ak Koyunlu's sovereignty lasted until 1501, Ismail I's conquest. Ismail I was founder of Safavid dynasty. This region was temporarily occupied by Ottoman Empire in 1514, in 1534, in 1548 and in 1553. It was then conquered by Ottoman Empire in 1585 but retaken by the Persian Safavid ruler Abbas I of Persia in 1603. Under the rule of Abbas I, the Armenians of Armavir were resettled in Persia and ancient Armavir was finally abandoned.

The settlement remained abandoned until 1613, when 7 Armenian families rebuilt a new village just 1 km east of the ancient site of Armavir.

It was occupied by Ottomans between 1635–1636 and 1724–1736. At the fall of the Safavid Empire, Armavir became part of the Erivan Khanate.

=== Russian rule ===
The Russo-Persian War (1826–1828) began due to Persian demand to reconquer the territories lost to Russia between 1804 and 1813. At first, the Persians repulsed the Russians from the South Caucasus in 1826. However, Russian general and commander of the Russian army, Ivan Paskevich, reconquered South Caucasus and extended its territories to include the Erivan Khanate in 1827.

This region formally passed from Persian to Russian sovereignty after the Treaty of Turkmenchay in 1828. Armavir became the Sardarabad uyezd of the Armenian Oblast, which itself became the Erivan Governorate in 1840. This situation lasted until the February Revolution in 1917.
