= Valarsace =

Valarsace (Old Armenian: Վաղարշակ Vałaršak, pronounced as Vagharshak) was of Parthian origin and the founder of the Armenian branch of the Arsacid dynasty, according to Movses of Khorenatsi's account. However, scholarship considers him to be a composite of various kings. The first work of the new king was said to wipe out brigandage. He was horrified by the barbarity of the country, whose inhabitants, he reported, lived by murder and pillage. Valarsace organized a subdivision of the Parthian empire and conferred his greatest favors upon Bagarat, one of the ancestors of the Bagratuni dynasty.
