= Agdzhakala =

Agdzhakala or Aghjaghala may refer to:

- Nerkin Bazmaberd, Armenia
- Tsaghkalanj, Armenia
