= Tsaghkalanj =

Village in Armavir, Armenia

Tsaghkalanj Ծաղկալանջ
- Location within Armenia
- Coordinates: 40°12′00″N 44°13′39″E
- Country: Armenia
- Marz (Province): Armavir

Population (2011)
  - Total: 1,283
- Time zone: UTC+4 ( )
  - Summer (DST): UTC+5 ( )

Tsaghkalanj (Armenian: Ծաղկալանջ, also Romanized as Tsakhkalandzh; until 1978, Agdzhakala and Aghjaghala) is a village in the Armavir Province of Armenia. The village's church, dedicated to Saint George (Surb Gevorg), dates to the 1870s. It rests on an earlier circular foundation. Nearby, is the whitewashed Amenaprkich Church of an unknown date. There is also a Neolithic-Chalcolithic tell in the village and Bronze Age burial mounds, while the ruins of Amenaprkich, a medieval settlement are nearby.

== Gallery ==
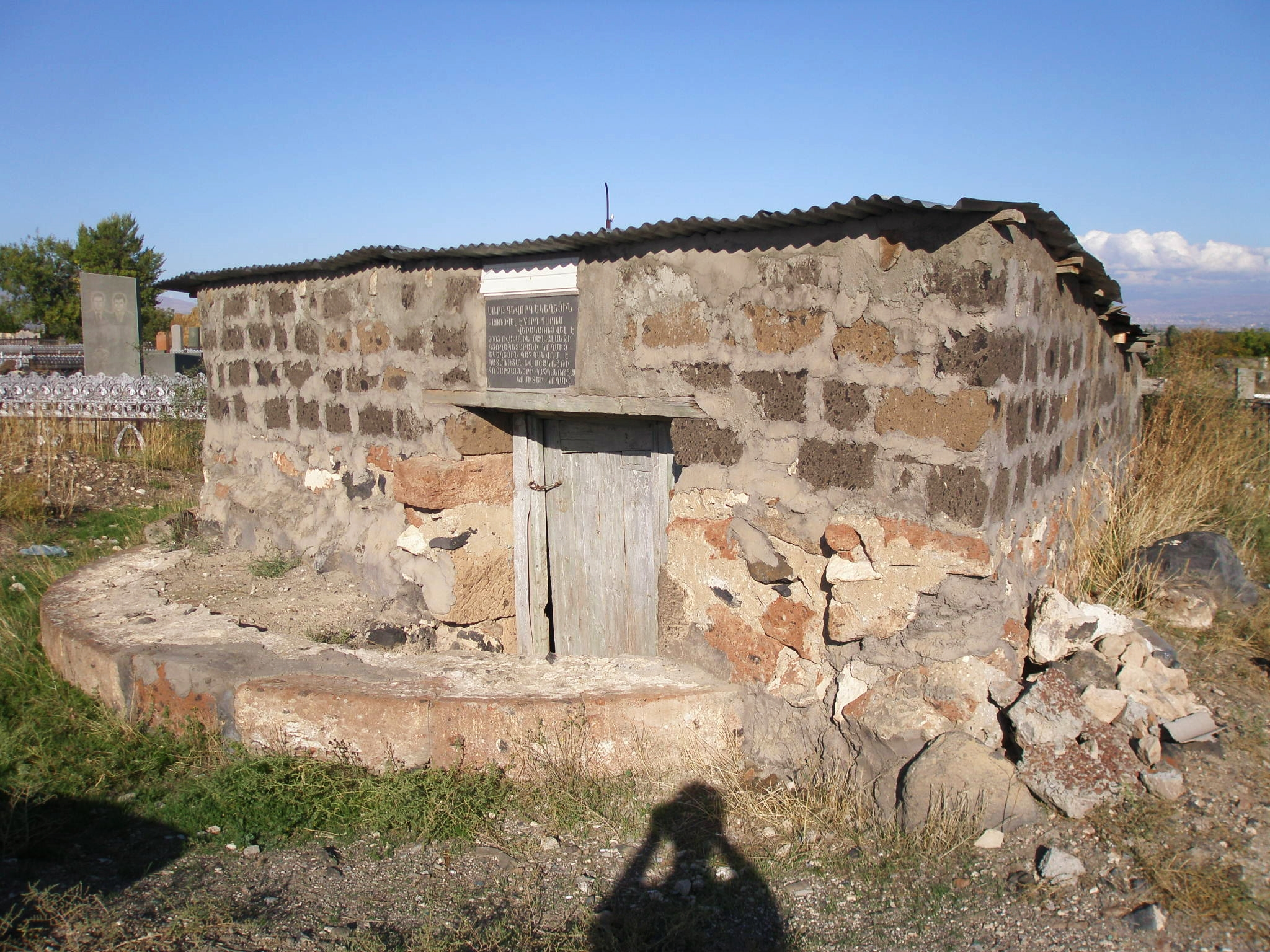
S. Gevorg chapel (1870s, restored 2003)

== See also ==
- Armavir Province
