= Nakhchivan rock signs =

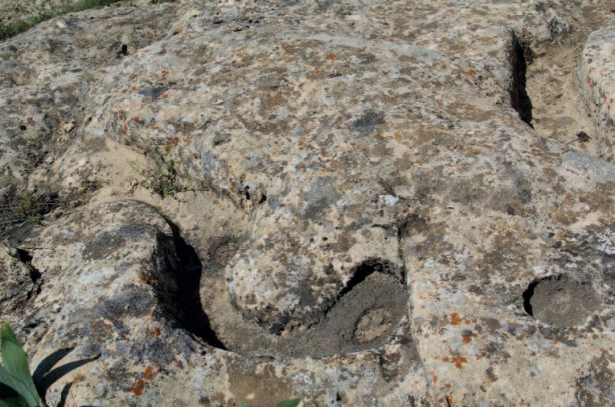
Nakhchivan rock signs

The Nakhchivan rock signs were found in 2016 at Agsal between the villages of Ərəfsə and Milax in the Culfa region of Azerbaijan.

== Description ==
Three rock signs were found in Agsal. A common feature of the rock sign drainage channels is that they are directed towards the canyon, indicating the possibility of fluid flow from them. The presence of rock marks on the graves suggests that some of them were used for cult purposes. The fact that the graves are next to the rock signs and some rock signs are used as wishing wells supports this view. It is interesting that around the Agsal rock shields there is a wishing tree that is visited by today's villagers.

Signs such as those found in Nakhchivan are very common in Southern Azerbaijan and Eastern Anatolia.

== See also ==
- Cup and ring mark
- Gezer
