= Milax =

Milax may refer to:

- Milax, Azerbaijan
- Milax (gastropod), a genus of land slugs in the family Milacidae
