= Hamo Sahyan =

Armenian poet and translator (1914–1993)

Hamo Sahyan Համո Սահյան
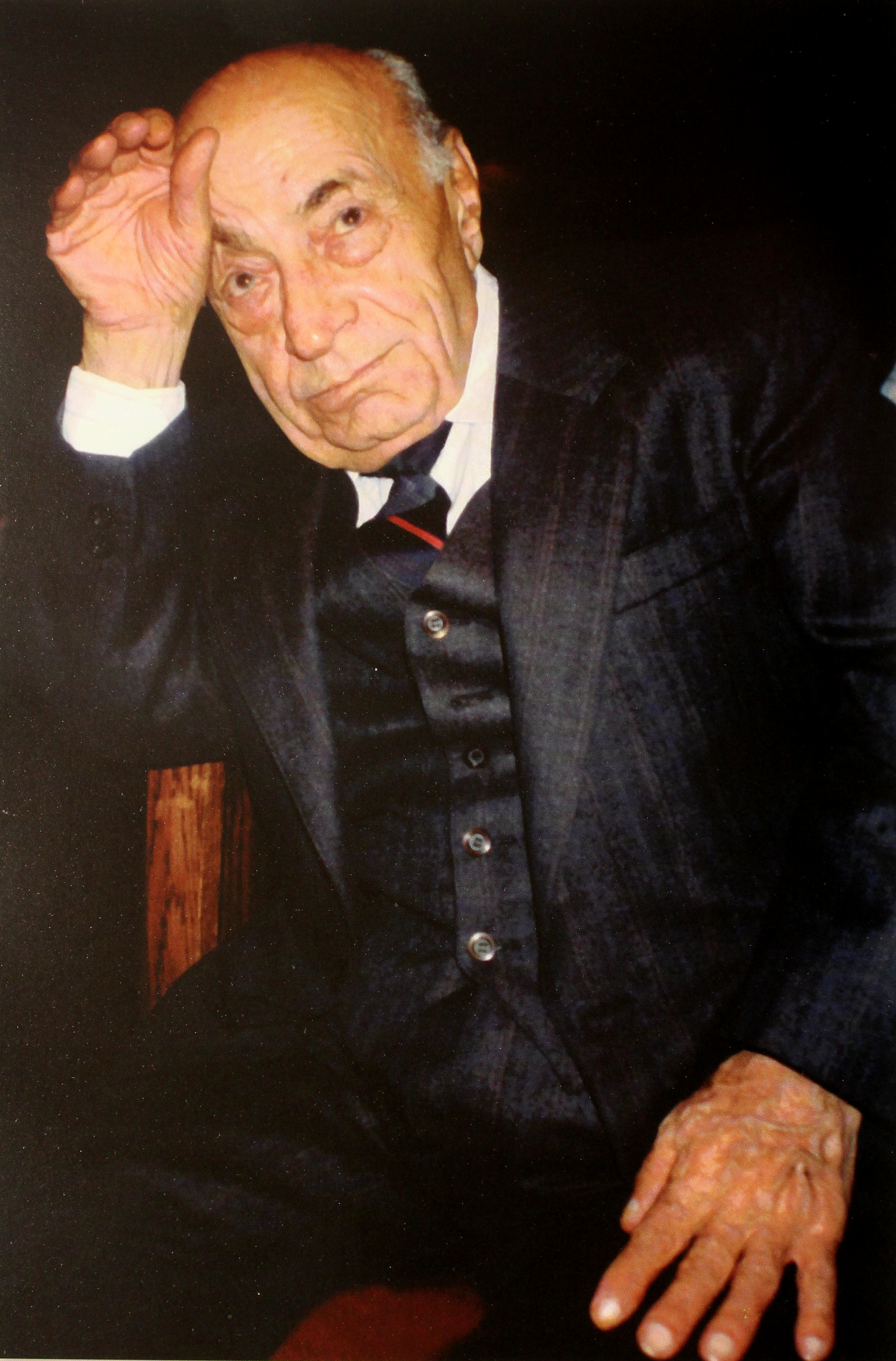
- Hamo Sahyan
- Born: 14 April 1914; Lor, Zangezur uezd, Elizavetpol Governorate, Caucasus Viceroyalty, Russian Empire
- Died: 16 July 1993 (aged 79); Yerevan, Armenia
- Occupations: Poet, translator
- Writing career
- Notable awards: State Prize of the Armenian SSR (1975)

Signature
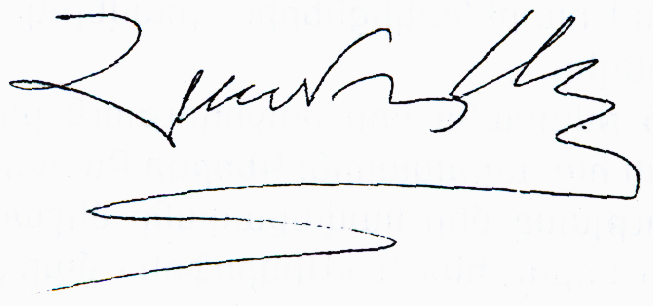

Hamo Sahyan (Armenian: Համո Սահյան, real name Hmayak Sahaki Grigoryan; April 14, 1914 – July 16 , 1993) was an Armenian poet and translator.

== Biography ==
Hamo Sahyan was born on April 14, 1914, in the village of Lor, near Sisian of the present-day Syunik region (then the Zangezur uezd of the Elizavetpol Governorate of the Russian Empire). His literary name was formed from the abbreviation of his name and the beginning of his patronymic.

In 1927, he moved to Baku to live with his uncle. In 1935, he entered and graduated from the Linguistic faculty of the Baku Pedagogical Institute in 1939. Between 1939 and 1941, he worked as a literary employee in the Baku magazine Soviet Writer. During the Great Patriotic War, he served in the navy as a sailor of the Caspian Fleet. Having returned from the 1945-1951 war he worked as a literary employee in the Baku newspaper Communist in Armenian.

In 1951, Sahyan moved to Yerevan and began working at the newspaper Avangard. From 1954 to 1955, at the start of the Khrushchev thaw, he worked at the magazine Vozni. Between 1965 and 1967, he was the editor-in-chief of Grakan Tert. In 1966, Sahyan signed a petition supporting the unification of Nagorno-Karabakh with Soviet Armenia, alongside Martiros Saryan, Yervand Kochar, Paruyr Sevak, and other major Armenian cultural figures.

The first collection of poems by Sahyan, entitled On the Edge of the Gate (Որոտանի եզերքին) was published in 1946. In the final years of Stalin's personality cult, Sahyan published three unsuccessful poetry collections. Later he published the collections On High (Բարձունքի վրա) (1955), Nairyan Dalar Bardi (Նաիրյան դալար բարդի) (1958), Armenia in Songs (Հայաստանը երգերի մեջ) (1962), Before Sunset (Մայրամուտից առաջ) (1964), and Song of stones (Քարափների երգը) (1968).

In 1972, the collection Open Sesame was published, for which Sahyan was awarded the State Prize of the Armenian SSR. During the 1970s and 1980s, the collections Evening Bread (Իրիկնահաց) (1977), Green-Red Autumn (Կանաչ-կարմիր աշուն) (1980), and Mint Flower (Դաղձի ծաղիկ) (1986) were also published. In 1998, a collection of typical poems by Hamo Sahyan, Don't Let Me Go (Ինձ բացակա չդնեք), was posthumously published. He did translations of Pushkin, Yesenin, Garcia Lorca, and others. He died on July 16, 1993, in Yerevan. The remains are buried in the Komitas Pantheon.

== About Hamo Sahyan ==
Hamo Sahyan was the correct man, he played and embarrassed himself during the game, he fought during his fight, he took a long time to realize that he looked like authentic literature, and he withdrew during the withdrawal. Hrant Matevosyan

This poet, Hamo Sahyan, comes from quails that fell in one of the Zangezur gorges. No, these are not just landscapes that Sagyan brought to our poetry, in the folds of these landscapes, in his largest layers, there is a movement of a just and kind, great and noble soul, the whole history of the soul, and a true poem is nothing more than the history of the soul hidden in the depths of images.

— Vahagn Davtyan

Hamo Sahyan's poetry continues to nourish readers, heals their wounded nerves and souls.

Razmik Davoyan
