= Aghitu =

Aghitu Աղիտու
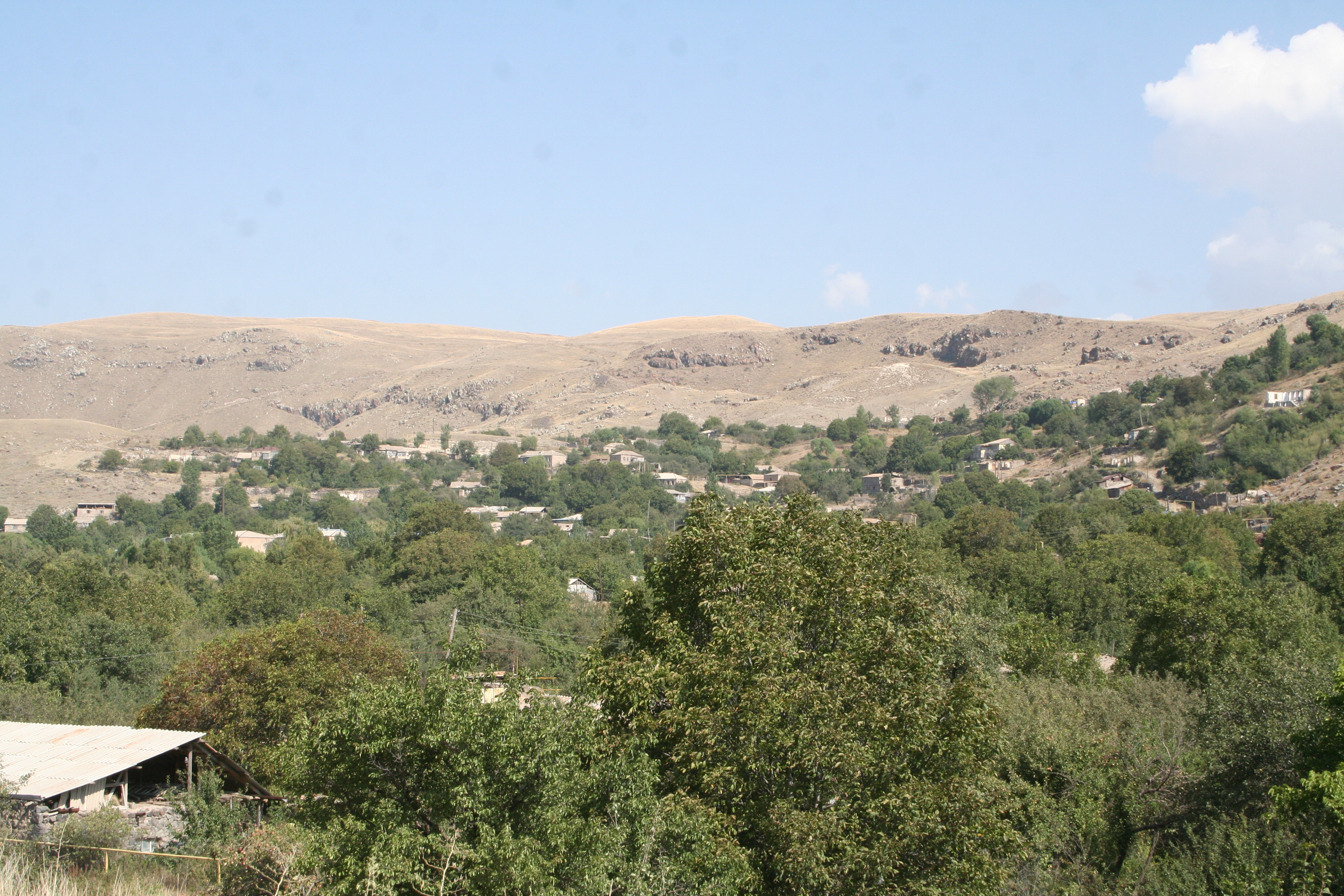
- Aghitu in 2013

- Location within Armenia Location within Syunik Province
- Coordinates: 39°30′55″N 46°04′51″E
- Country: Armenia
- Province: Syunik
- Municipality: Sisian

Area
  - Total: 19.44 km^{2} (7.51 sq mi)

Population (2011)
  - Total: 436
  - Density: 22.4/km^{2} (58.1/sq mi)
- Time zone: UTC+4 (AMT)

Aghitu (Armenian: Աղիտու) is a village in the Sisian Municipality of the Syunik Province in Armenia. It is located on the left bank of the Vorotan river, 7 kilometers east of the regional capital of Sisian.

== History ==
In the 2nd to 1st millennium BC, the territory of Aghitu was one of the southern strongholds of the Etiuni confederation in Armenia, with the archaeological ruins of a fortress from that time period located in the village.

== Mausoleum of Aghitu ==
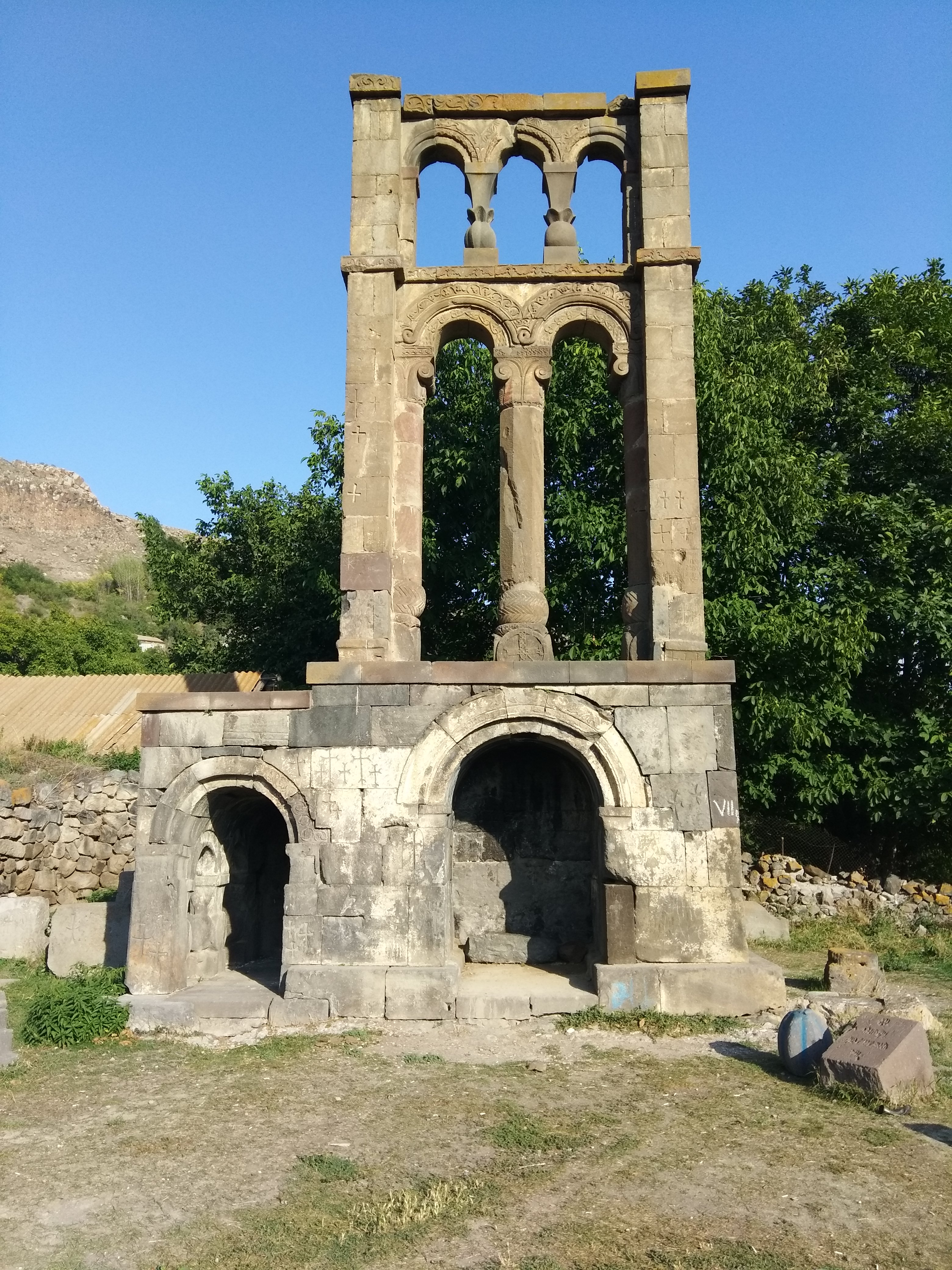
Aghitu Mausoleum (Mahardzan)

The village is famous for the 6th-7th century Aghitu mausoleum and funerary complex. Two rectangular towers rise above the mausoleum with a richly decorated octagonal column in the center. The monument is decorated with carvings of pomegranates, grapes, vegetables, and geometric ornaments similar to the 7th century churches of Sisian and Zvartnots. According to tradition, the mausoleum was in honor of three Armenian princes of Syunik who fought off Persian soldiers. The Persians and Armenians fought a decisive battle near a village called Aghudi where they were able to drive out the Persians. However, that battle took the lives of the three princes. In their honor, the residents of the village buried the princes and built a crypt and monument for them. The monument was damaged in the earthquake of 1931 however it was restored promptly by the Armenian authorities.

== Demographics ==
The Statistical Committee of Armenia reported its population as 304 in 2010, up from 209 at the 2001 census. Prior to 1988, the village was partly inhabited by Azerbaijanis who settled there from Nakhchivan, Iran, and other localities.

== Gallery ==
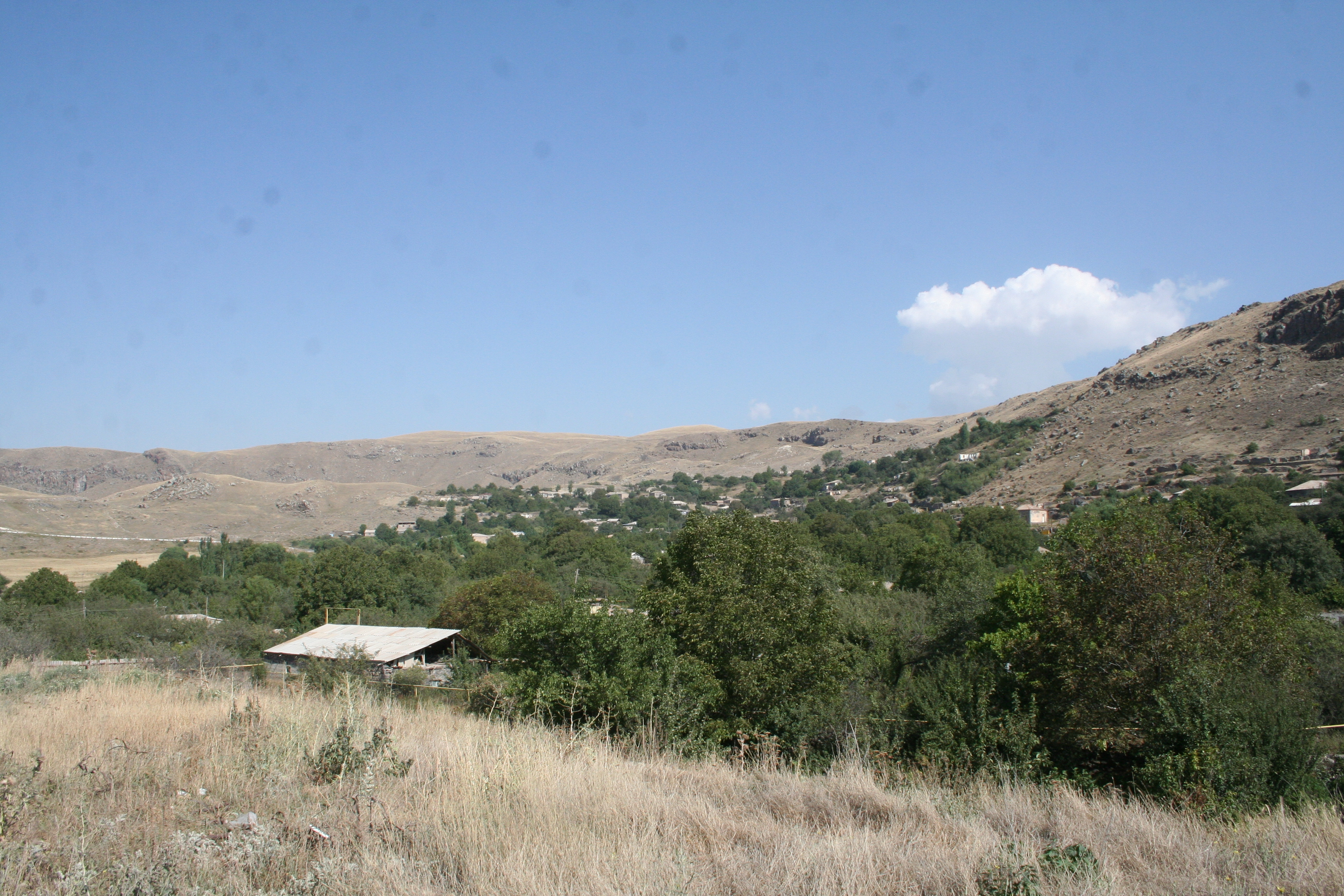
Scenery

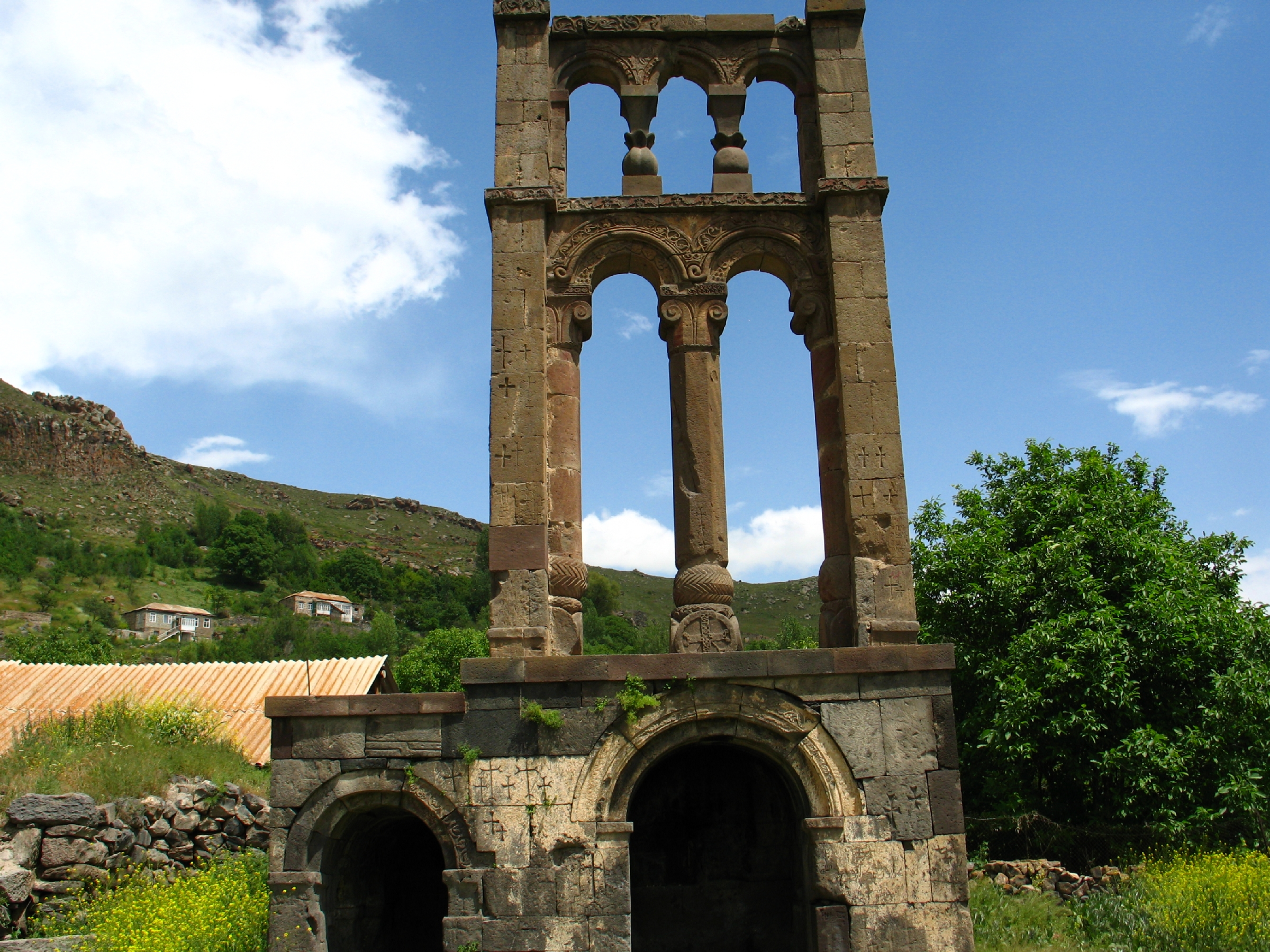
Aghitu monument

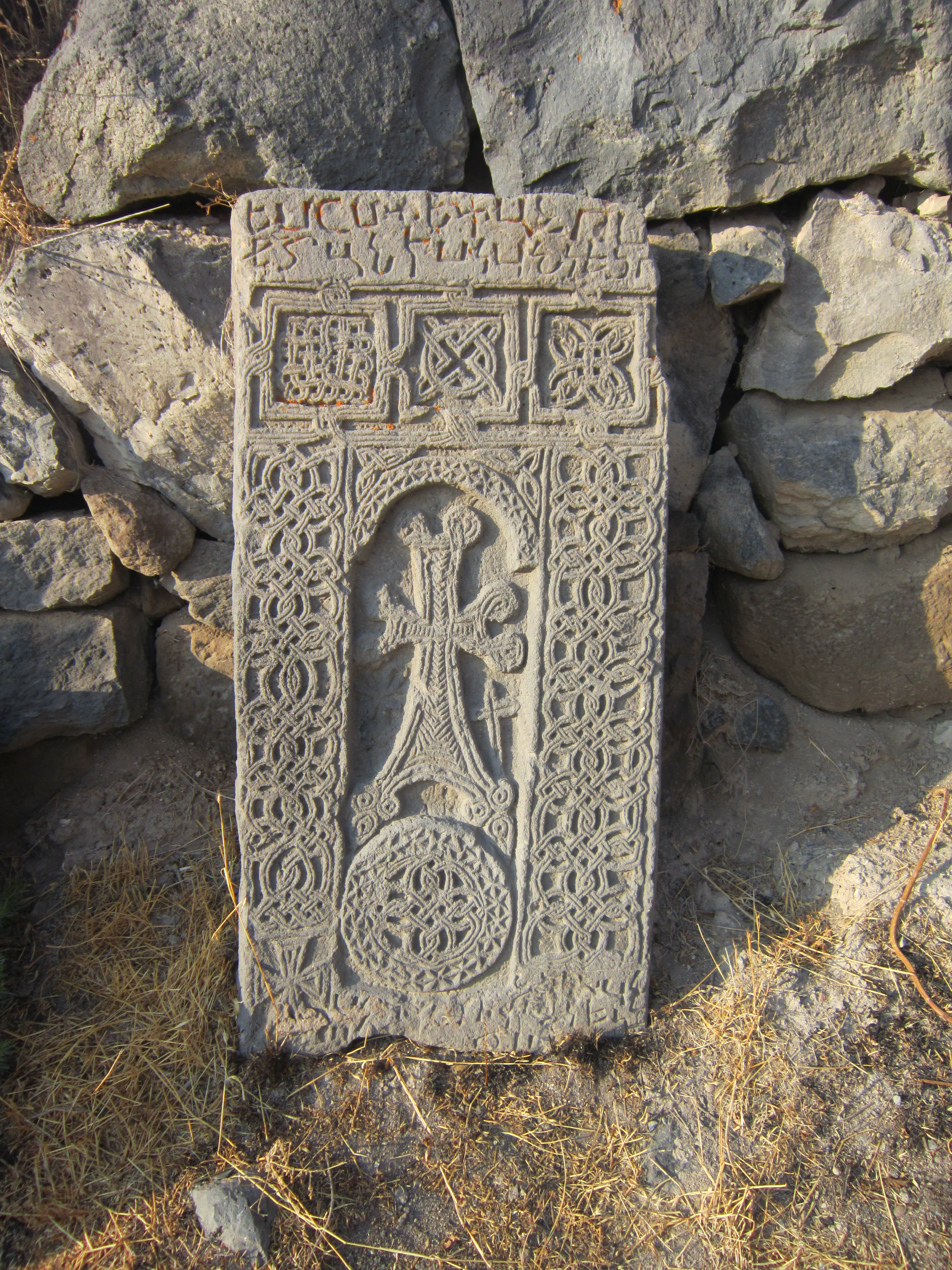
Khachkar in Aghitu

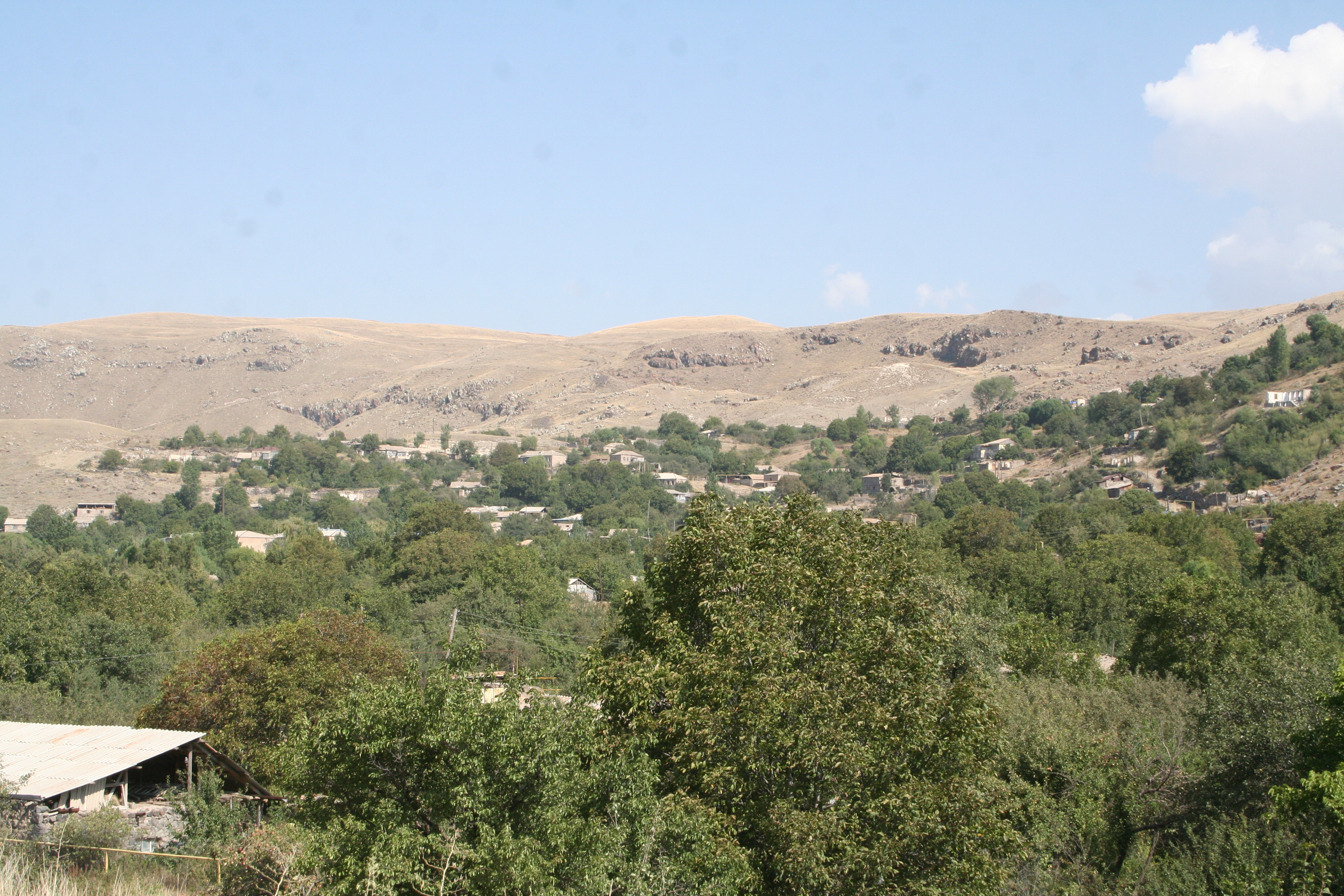
Scenery
