= Sisian =

City in Syunik, Armenia

Sisian Սիսիան
- Town
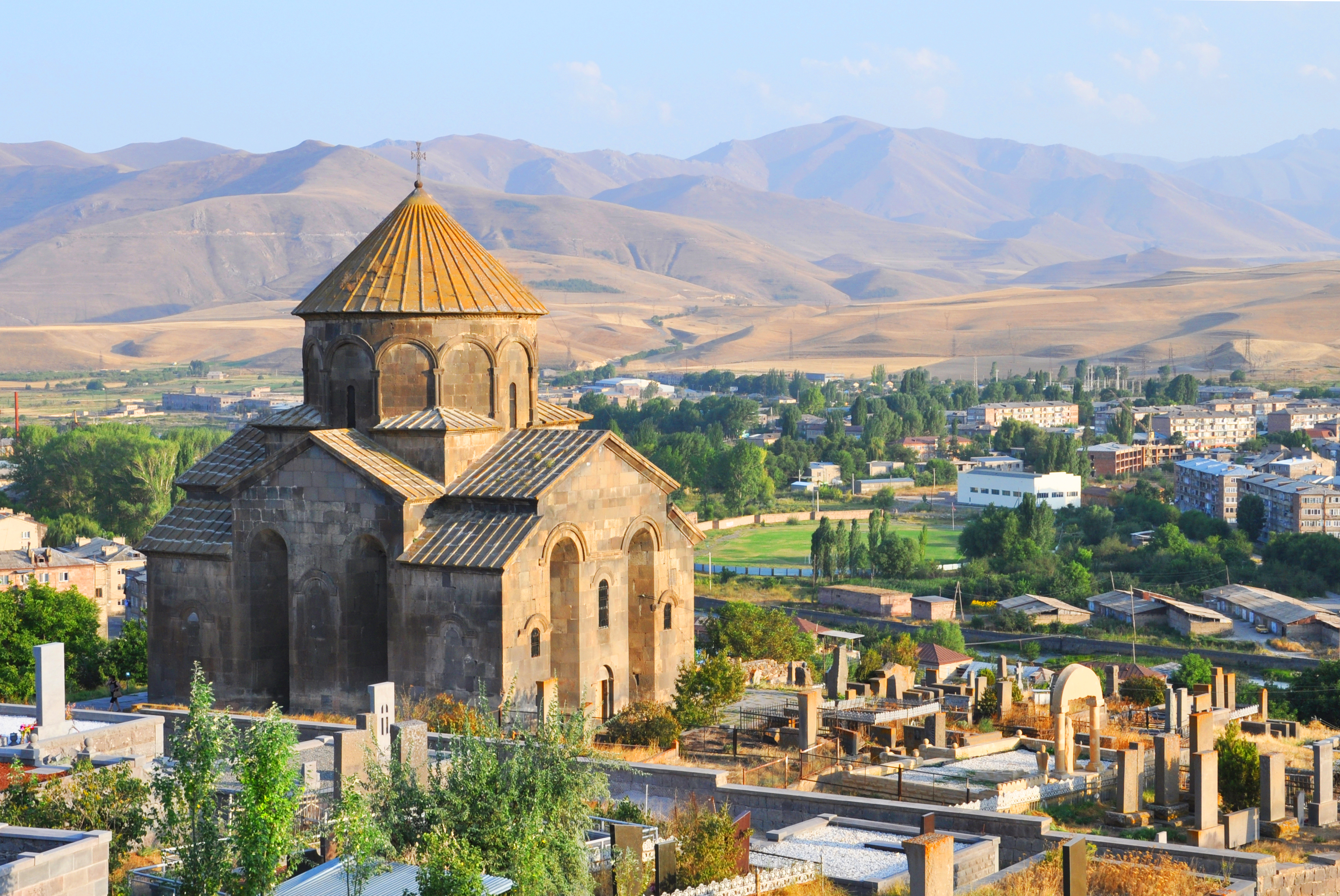
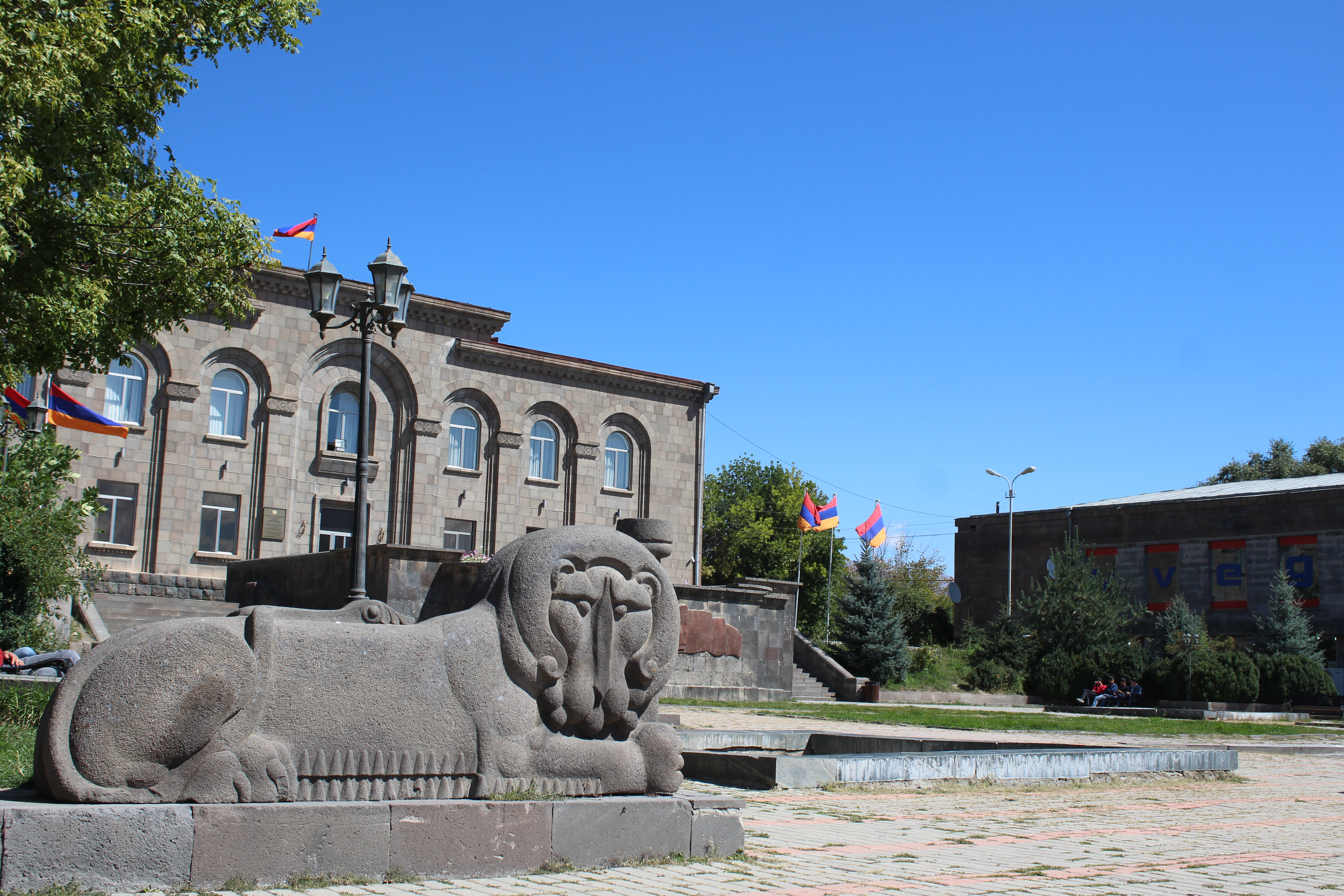
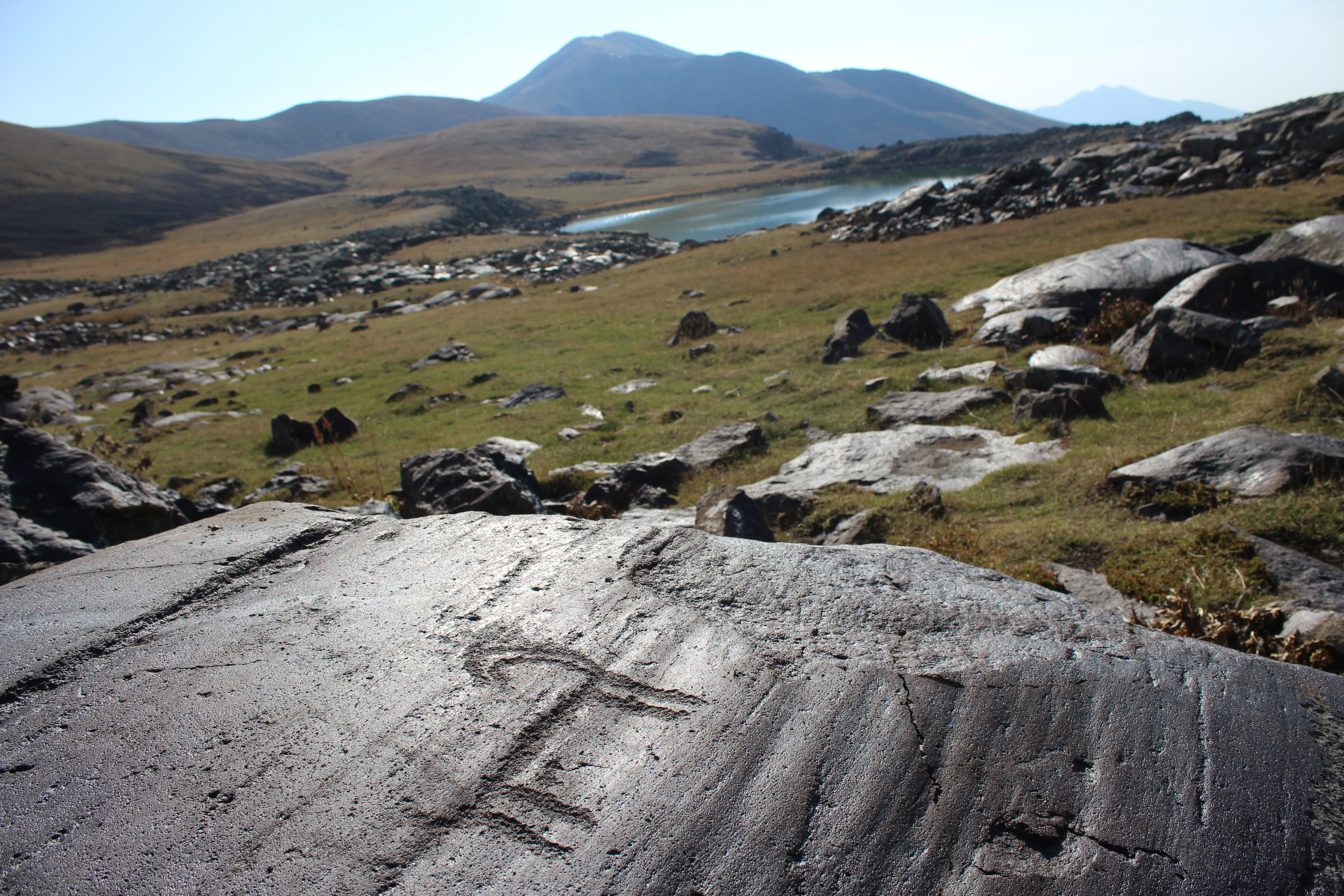
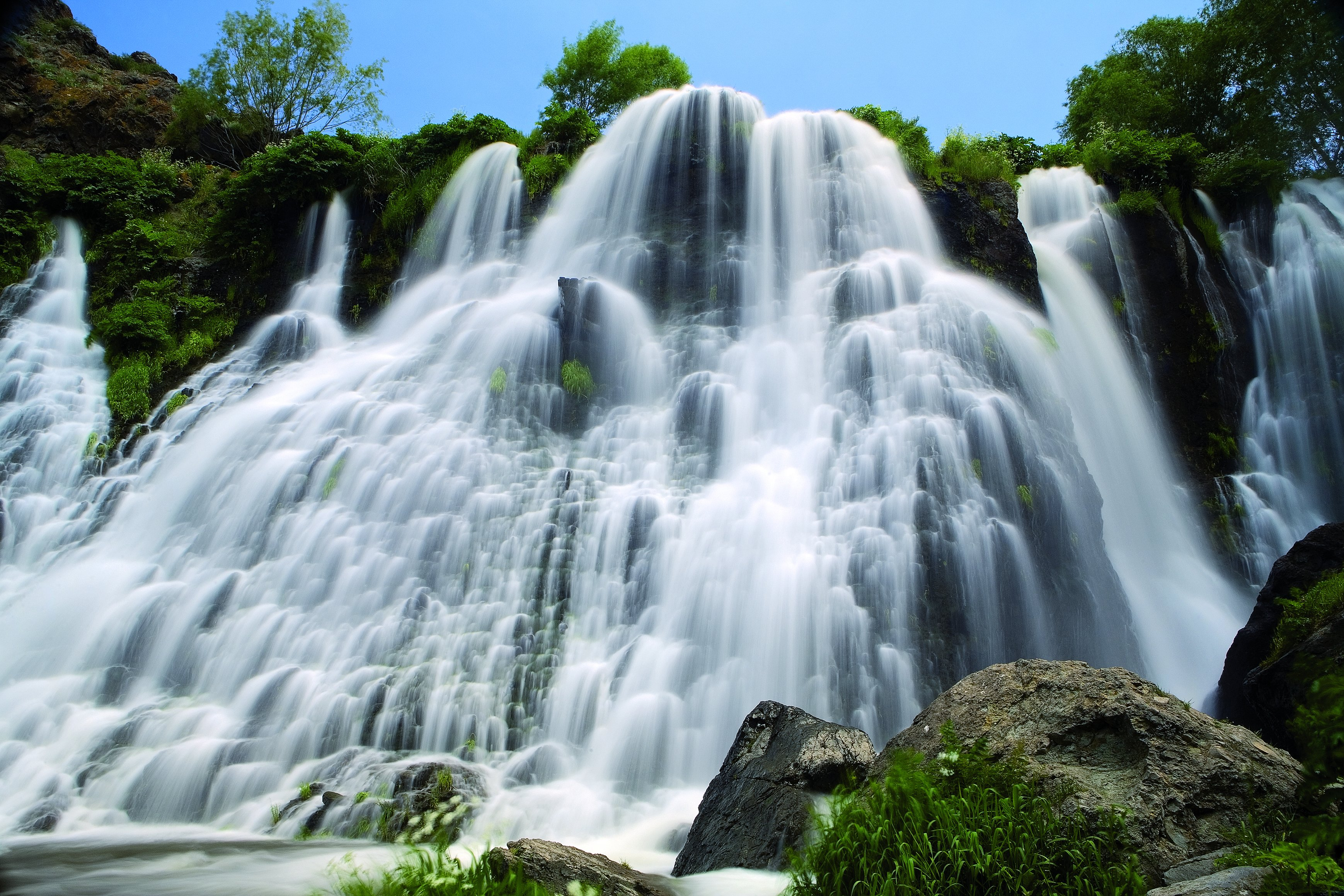
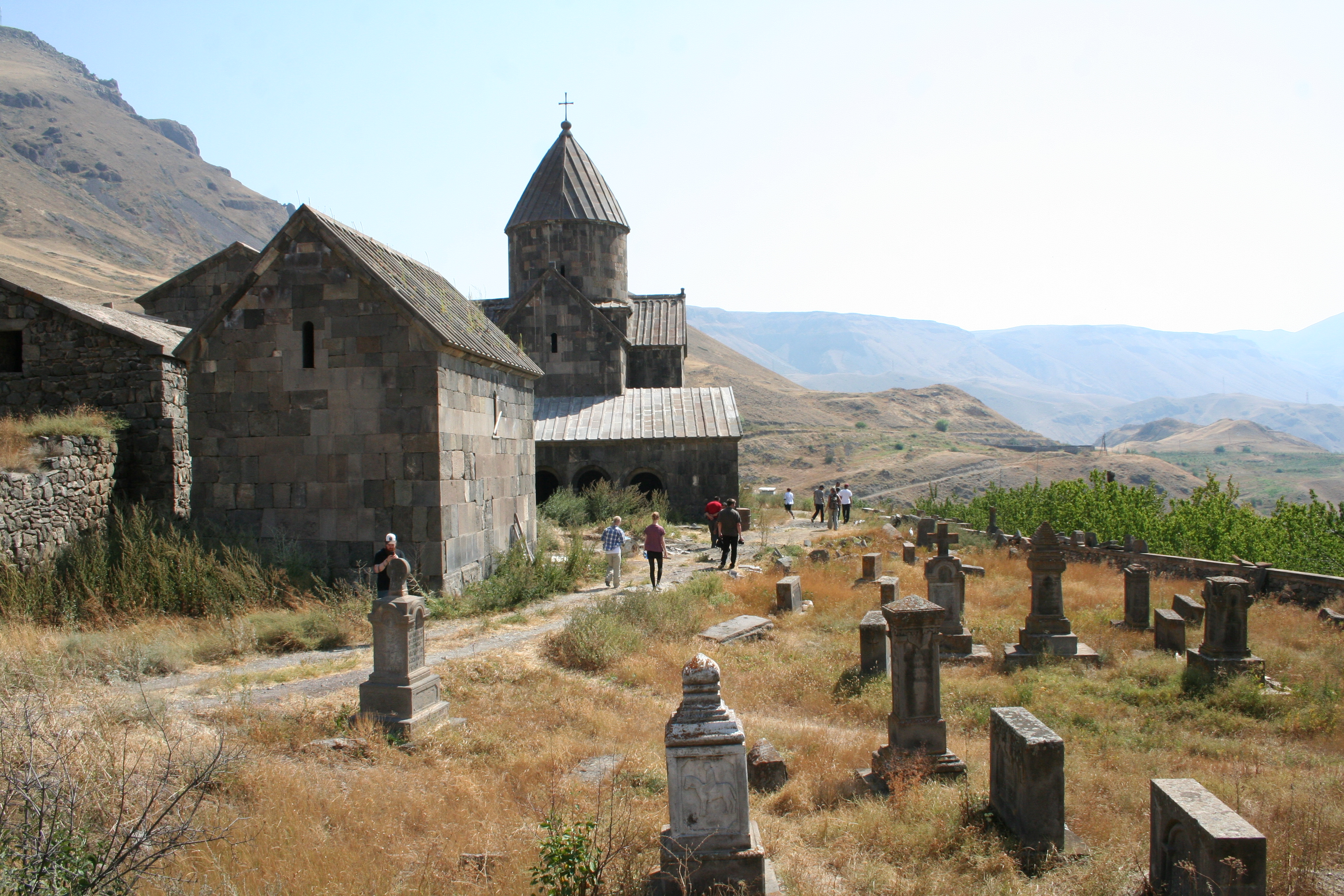
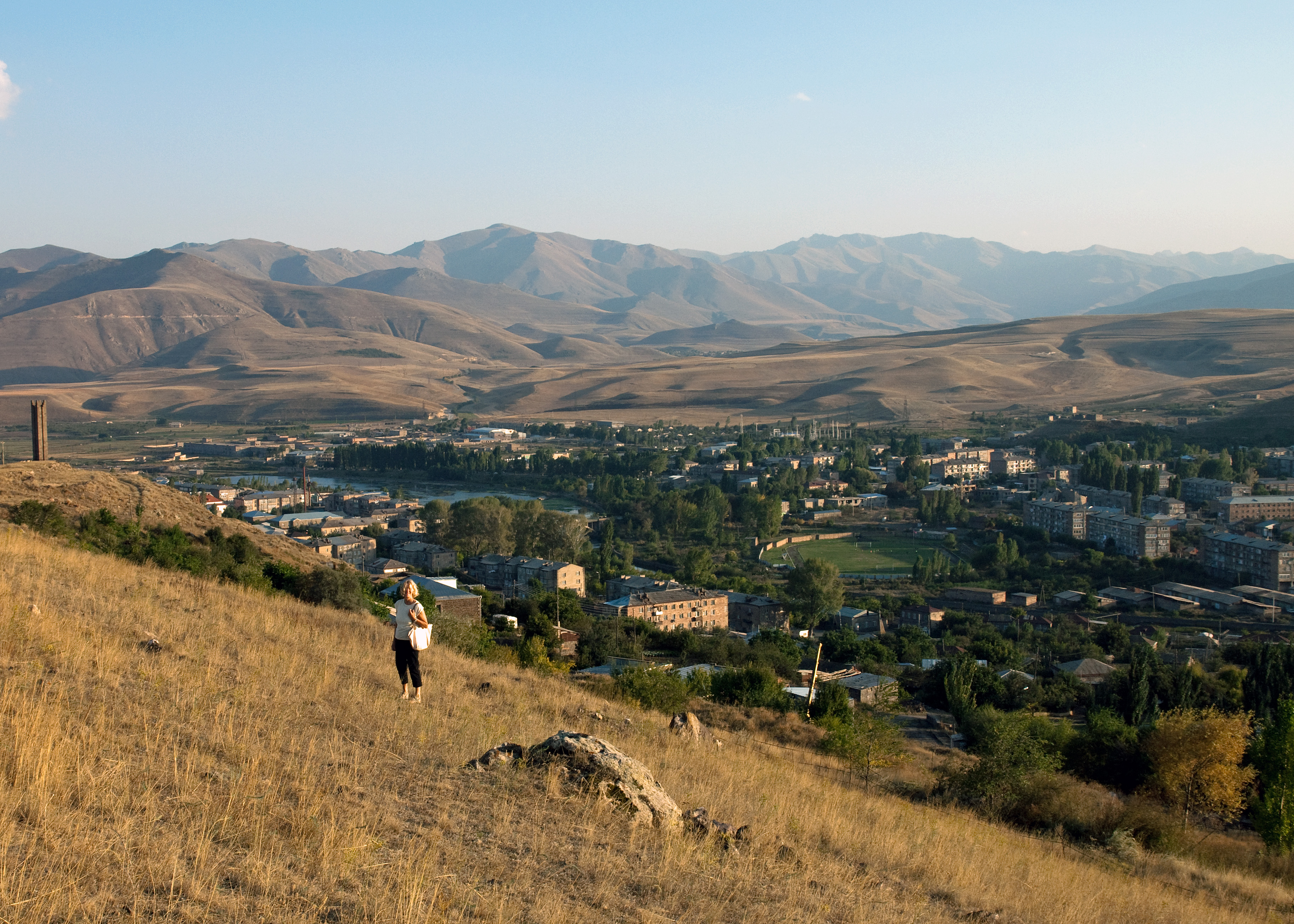
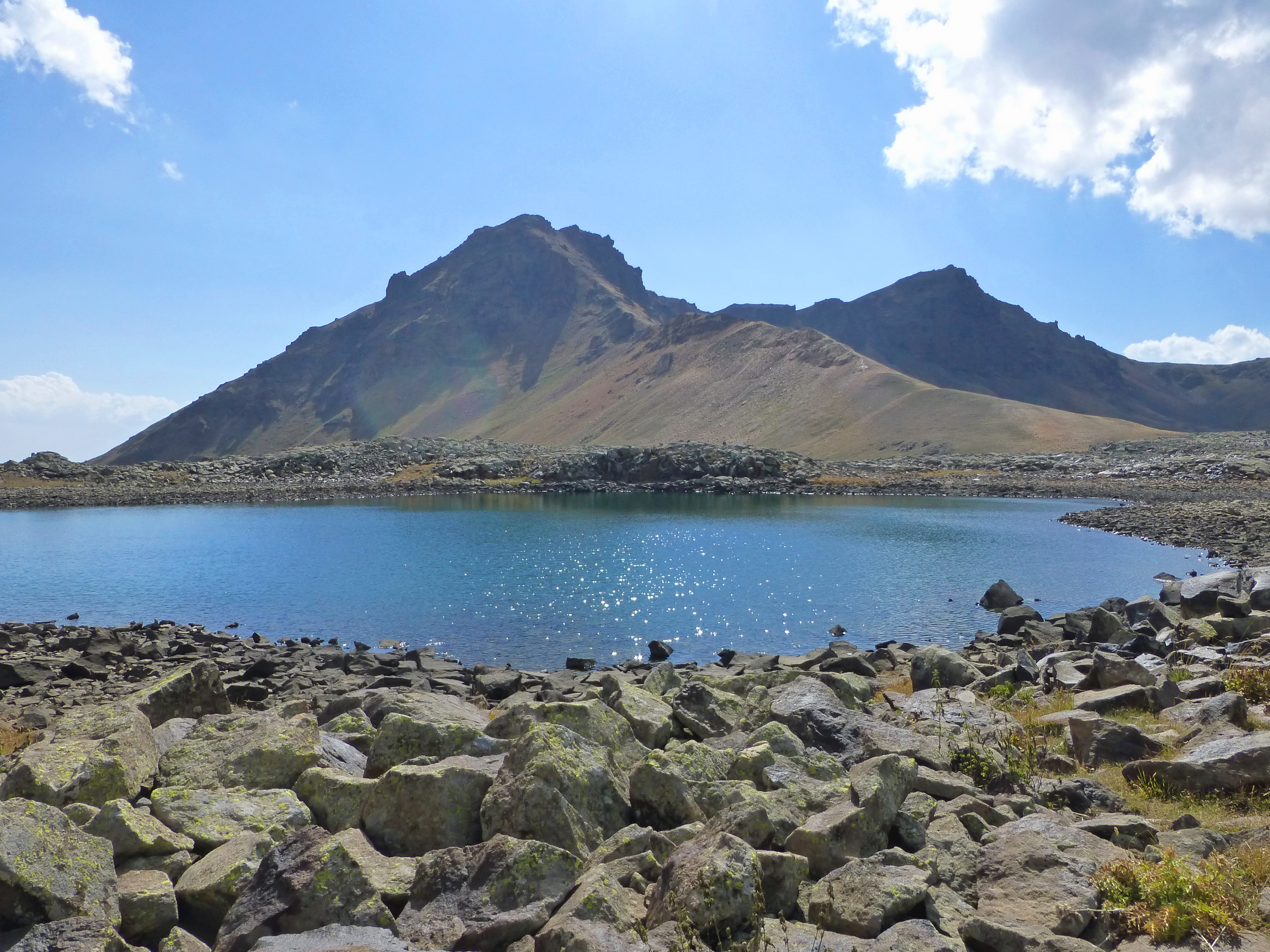
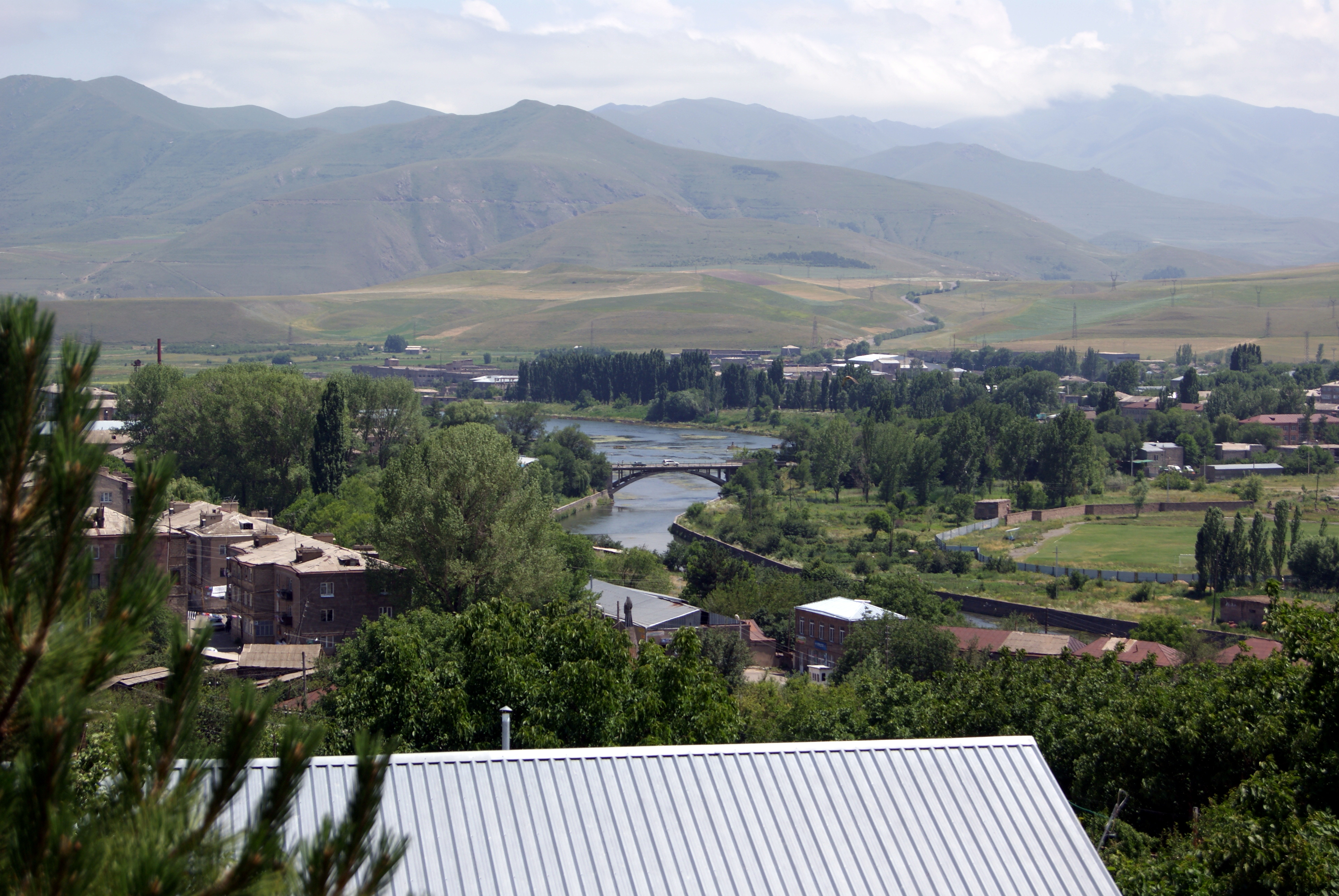
- Saint Gregory Church of 689 Sisian Town Hall Ughtasar Petroglyphs Shaki Waterfall Vorotnavank General view of Sisian Sisian with Mt Mets Ishkhanasar Vorotan River

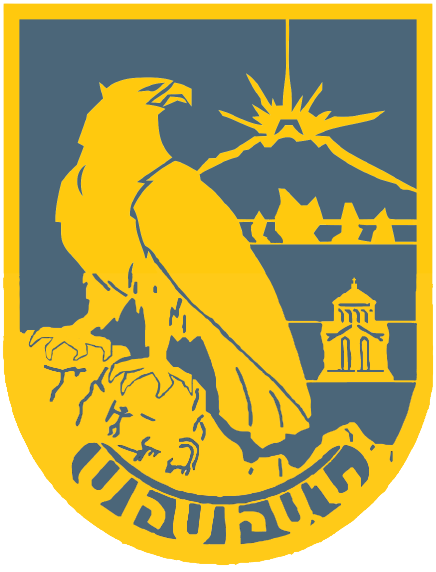
- Coat of arms

- Location within Armenia Location within Syunik Province
- Coordinates: 39°31′15″N 46°01′56″E
- Country: Armenia
- Province: Syunik
- Municipality: Sisian
- First mentioned: 8th century BC

Government
  - Mayor: Armen Hakobjanyan

Area
  - Total: 9 km^{2} (3.5 sq mi)
- Elevation: 1,600 m (5,200 ft)

Population (2022)
  - Total: 13,179
  - Density: 1,500/km^{2} (3,800/sq mi)
- Time zone: UTC+4 (AMT)
- Area code: +374 2830
- Website: Official website

Sisian (Armenian: Սիսիան [sisˈjɑn]) is a town and the centre of the Sisian Municipality of the Syunik Province in southern Armenia. It is located on both banks of the Vorotan River, at an altitude of 1600 m above sea level, 6 km south of the Yerevan-Meghri highway, at a road distance of 217 km southeast of the capital Yerevan, and 115 km north of the provincial capital Kapan.

As of the 2022 census, the population of the town was 13,179.

== Etymology ==
The area of present-day Sisian was also known as Sisakan and Sisavan during ancient times and later in the Middle Ages. According to Movses Khorenatsi, the name of Sisakan—and subsequently Sisian—was derived from Sisak, a legendary ancestor of the Armenian princely house of Syuni.

== History ==
=== Ancient history and Middle Ages ===
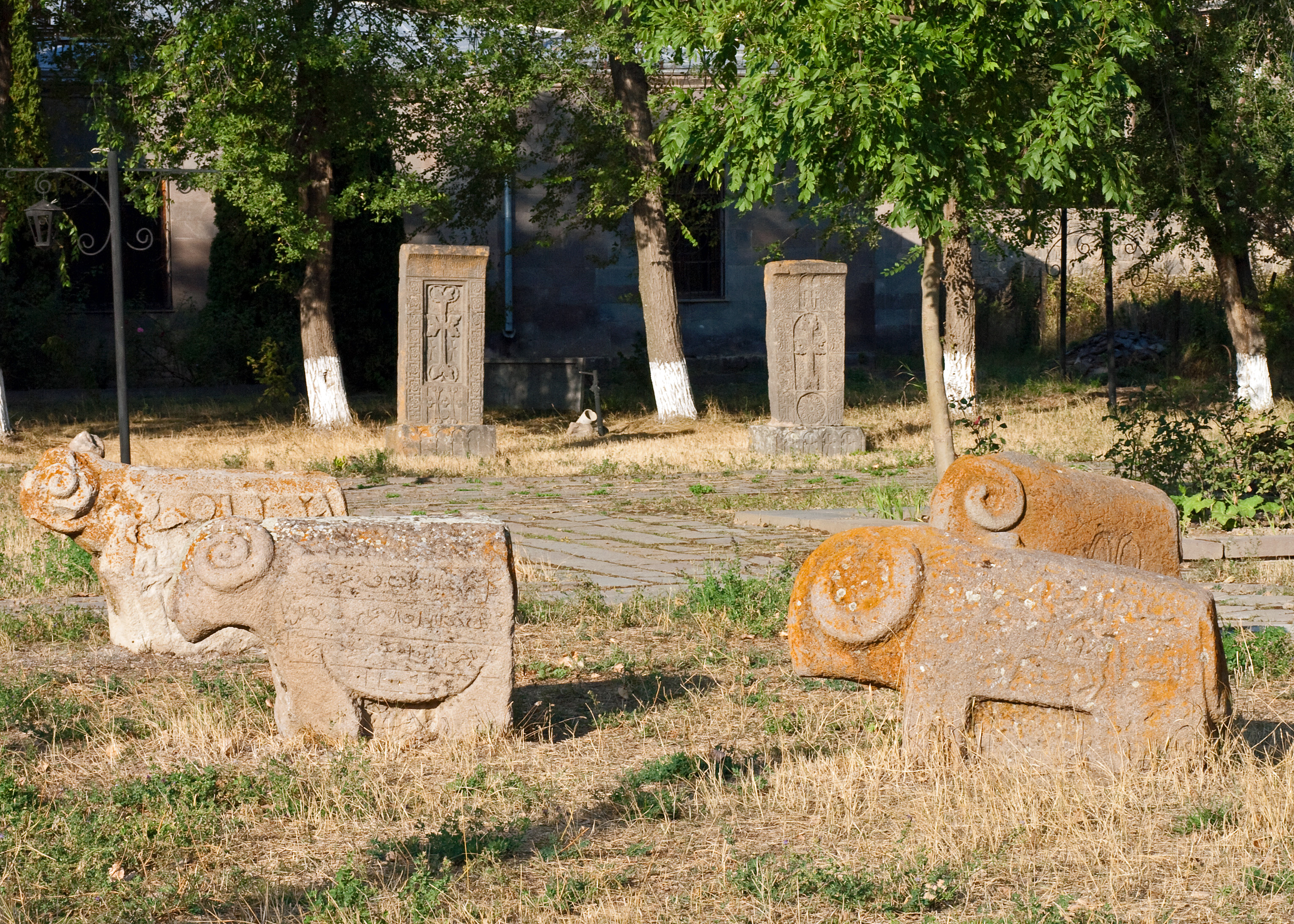
Tombstones of pre-Christian era in Sisian

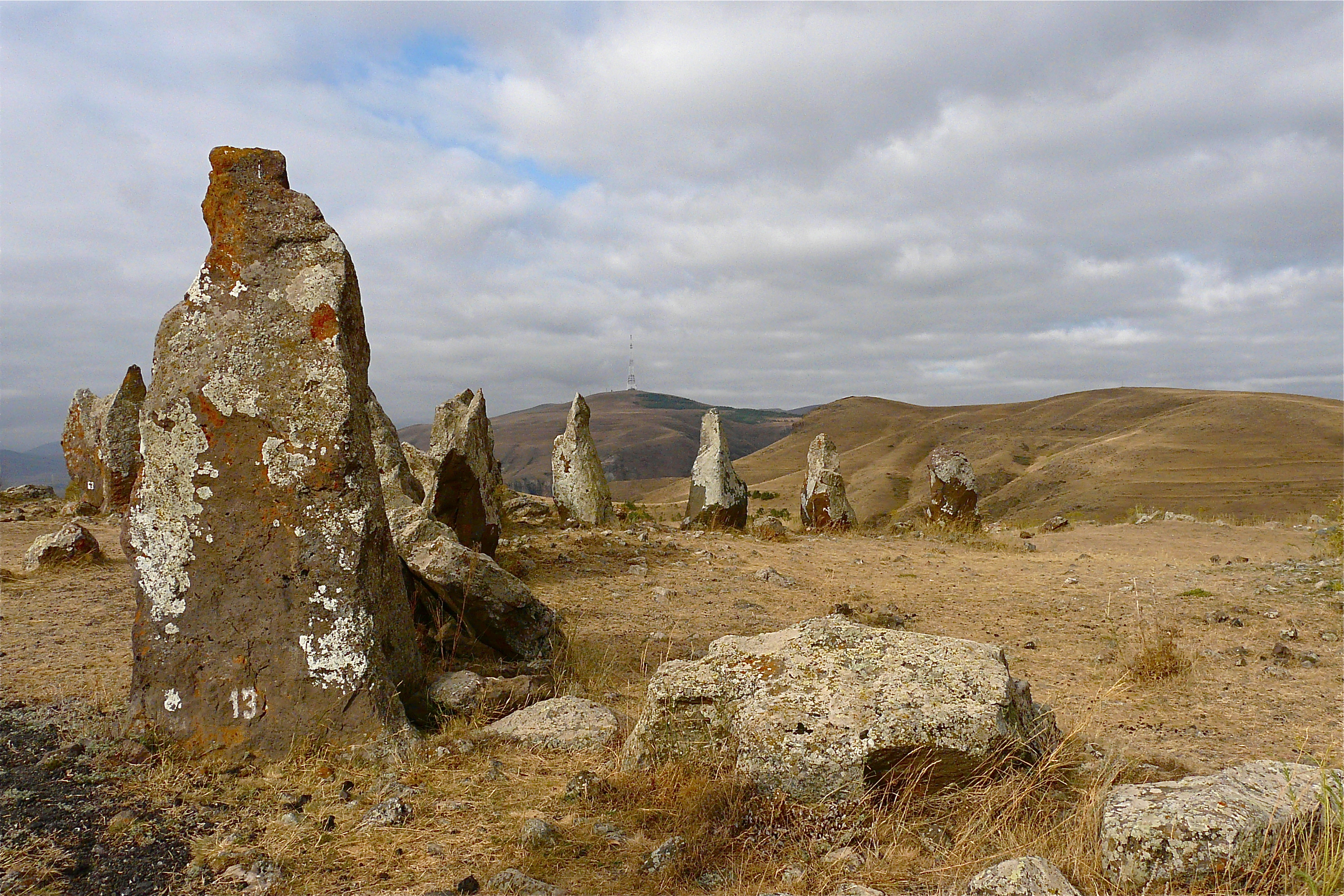
Zorats Karer archaeological site

Archaeological excavations of tombs and ceramics of the middle Bronze Age found in Sisian have been connected to the Trialeti-Vanadzor culture. Historically, the territory of modern-day Sisian was part of the Tsghuk canton within historic Syunik, the 9th province of Greater Armenia. Some scholars identify Tsghuk with Suluqu, a country mentioned in a cuneiform inscription of King Argishti II of Urartu in the 8th century BC.

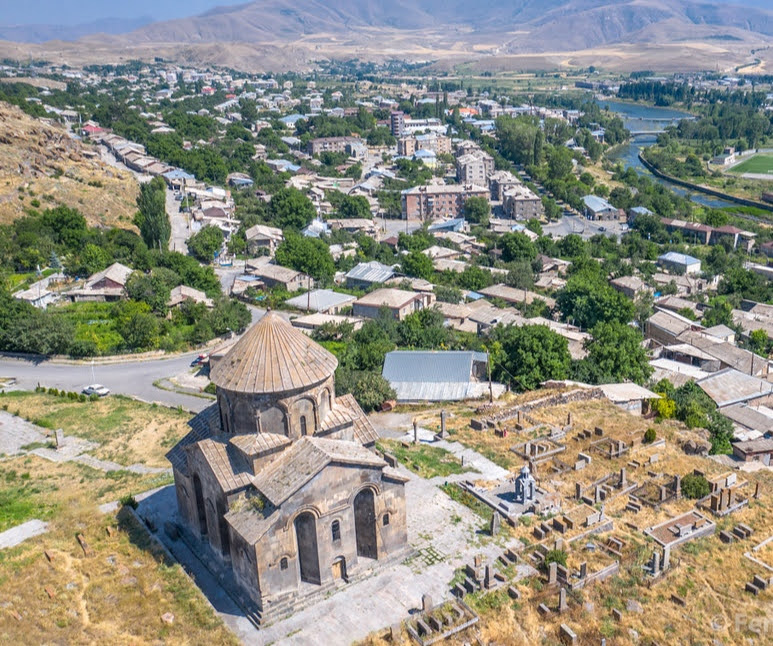
7th-century St. Gregory Church overlooking Sisian

Between 331 BC and 428 AD, the region of Sisian—known as Sisakan—was part of the ancient Kingdom of Armenia under the reign of the Orontid, Artaxiad and Arsacid dynasties. During the 4th century, the historic settlement of Shaghat near Sisakan became the residence of the Syuni princes, the ruling dynasty of historic Syunik. In the medieval period, Armenia became a battleground of invading Byzantine, Persian, and Arab forces. During this period, the medieval monuments of Sisian, notably the St. Gregory Church of Sisian, were constructed in the 7th and early 8th centuries. These churches were largely commissioned by the aristocratic Armenian princes that autonomously ruled the region from the fall of Arsacid Armenia in 428 to the rise of the royal Armenian kingdoms of the 9th century. It remained the spiritual and the political center of the region until the end of the 10th century, when the fortified town of Kapan in the southern Baghk canton became the capital of the newly established Kingdom of Syunik in 987 under the protectorate of the Bagratid Kingdom of Armenia.

In 1103, the region was invaded and looted by the Seljuks. After the fall of the Kingdom of Syunik in 1170, Syunik along with the rest of the historic territories of Armenia suffered from the Seljuk, Mongol, Aq Qoyunlu and Kara Koyunlu invasions, in that order, between the 12th and 15th centuries. In the middle of the 13th century, Sisian was one of the residences of the Mongol Noyan and commander Baiju during the period of Mongol Armenia. In 1247, a Dominican mission, including Simon of Saint-Quentin and Ascelin of Lombardy, sent by Pope Innocent IV, arrived at the great Mongol encampment of the castle of Sisian in Armenia. They were sent to ask for a meeting with the commander Baiju, but were refused due to their arrogance and assertion that Christians were superior and that the Pope refused to bow down to Baiju. After 3 months, Baiju sent them back with a letter to the Pope demanding submission to him.

=== Persian rule ===
At the beginning of the 16th century, Sisakan became part of the Erivan Beglarbegi within the Safavid Persia. It was known as Gharakilisa (Turkic: Qarakilsə, lit. 'Black church') to the Turkic and Persian rulers of Eastern Armenia. From the late Middle Ages, the Armenian Tangian meliks ruled Sisian. By the beginning of the 18th century, Sisakan was associated with the Armenian military leader David Bek, who led the liberation campaign of the Armenians of Syunik against Safavid Persia and the invading Ottoman Turks. David Bek started his battles in 1722 with the help of thousands of local Armenian patriots who liberated Syunik. In 1750, Sisakan became part of the newly formed Karabakh Khanate.

=== Russian rule ===
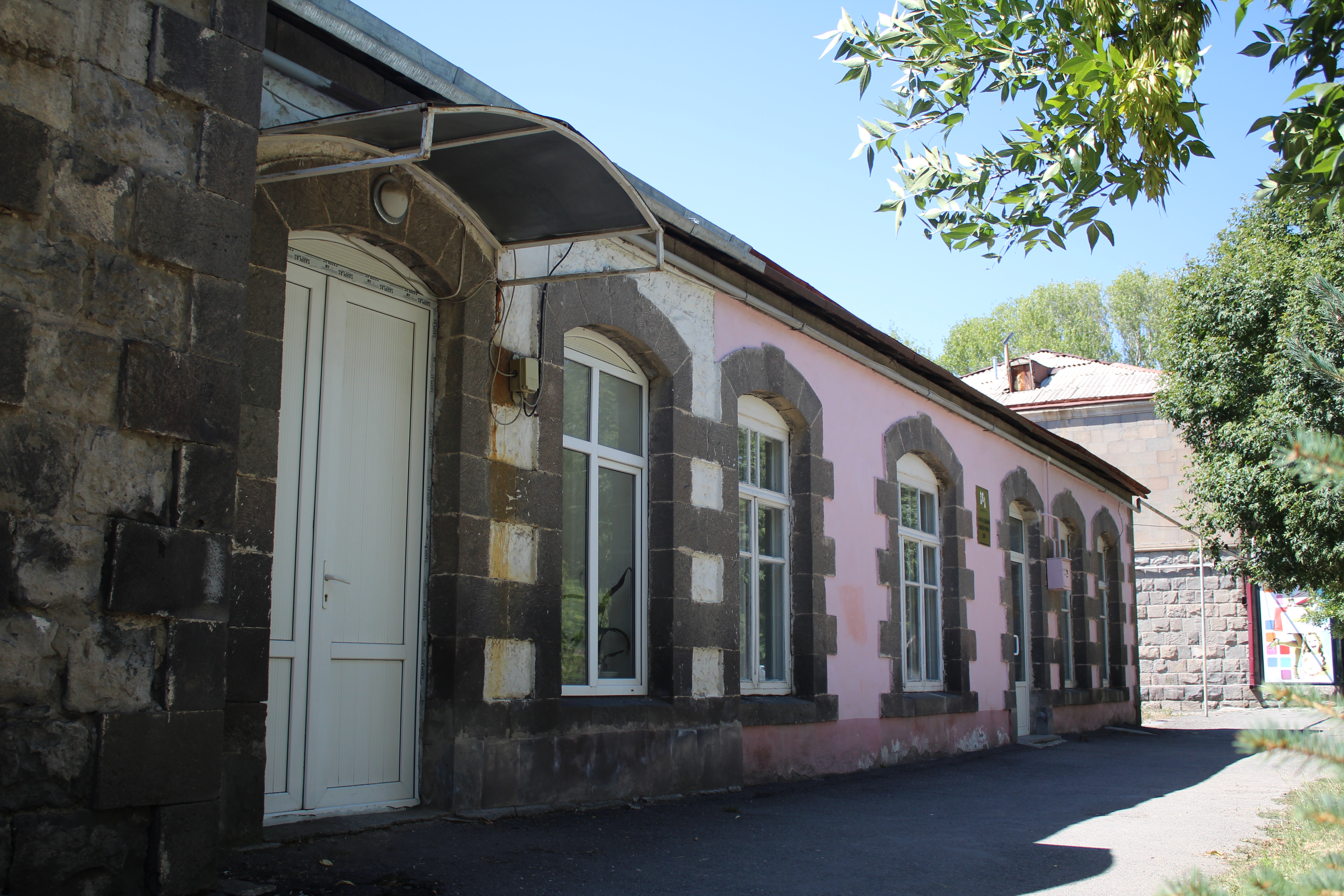
19th century building in Sisian

At the beginning of the 19th century, many territories of southern Armenia including the region of Sisakan became part of the Russian Empire as a result of the Treaty of Gulistan, signed on 24 October 1813 between Russia and Qajar Iran following the Russo-Persian War of 1804–13. In 1828–30, many Armenian families from the Iranian cities of Khoy and Salmast migrated to the region. In 1868, Sisakan became part of the Zangezur uezd, within the Elizavetpol Governorate of the Russian Empire. By 1886, it had a population of around 1,000 people, including 18 local meliks.

=== Modern history ===
After World War I, Sisakan became part of the short-lived independent Republic of Armenia between 1918 and 1920. Following the Sovietization of Armenia in December 1920, Sisian was included in the breakaway Republic of Mountainous Armenia under the leadership of Garegin Nzhdeh, who fought against the Bolsheviks and maintained an independent state between 26 April and 12 July 1921.

After the Soviet Red Army entered the Zangezur region in July 1921, Sisakan along with the towns of Goris, Kapan and Meghri fell under Soviet rule. In 1930, Sisian became the centre of the newly founded Sisian raion. The town and the raion were known as Gharakilisa until 1935, and Sisavan between 1935–40. With the operation of the Vorotan Cascade during the 1960s, the town of Sisian witnessed rapid growth. Many industrial plants and service-providing firms were opened in the region. In 1974, Sisian received the status of a "city of regional subordination" within the Sisian shrjan of the Armenian Soviet Socialist Republic. The major urban plan of the city was adopted in 1976. An airstrip was opened in 1982 at the northeastern suburbs of the town, adjacent to the main north-south highway of Armenia. The Sisian airport no longer operates for civilian aviation and is currently the site of a joint Russian-Armenian military post.

Following the independence of Armenia in 1991, Sisian was incorporated into the newly formed Syunik Province based on the 1995 administrative reforms.

== Geography ==
=== Topography ===
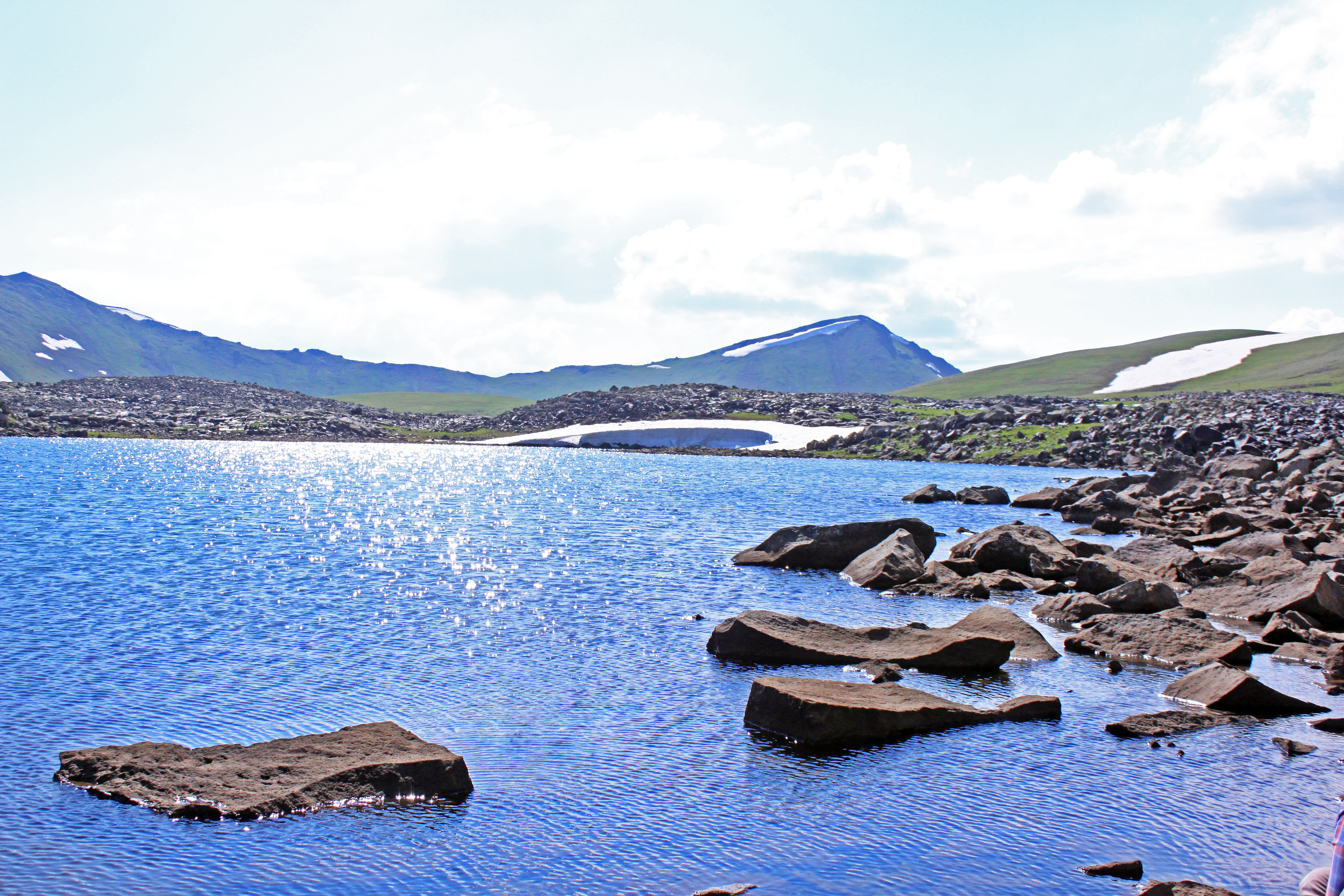
Mount Ughtasar with its volcanic crater lake, 14 km north of Sisian

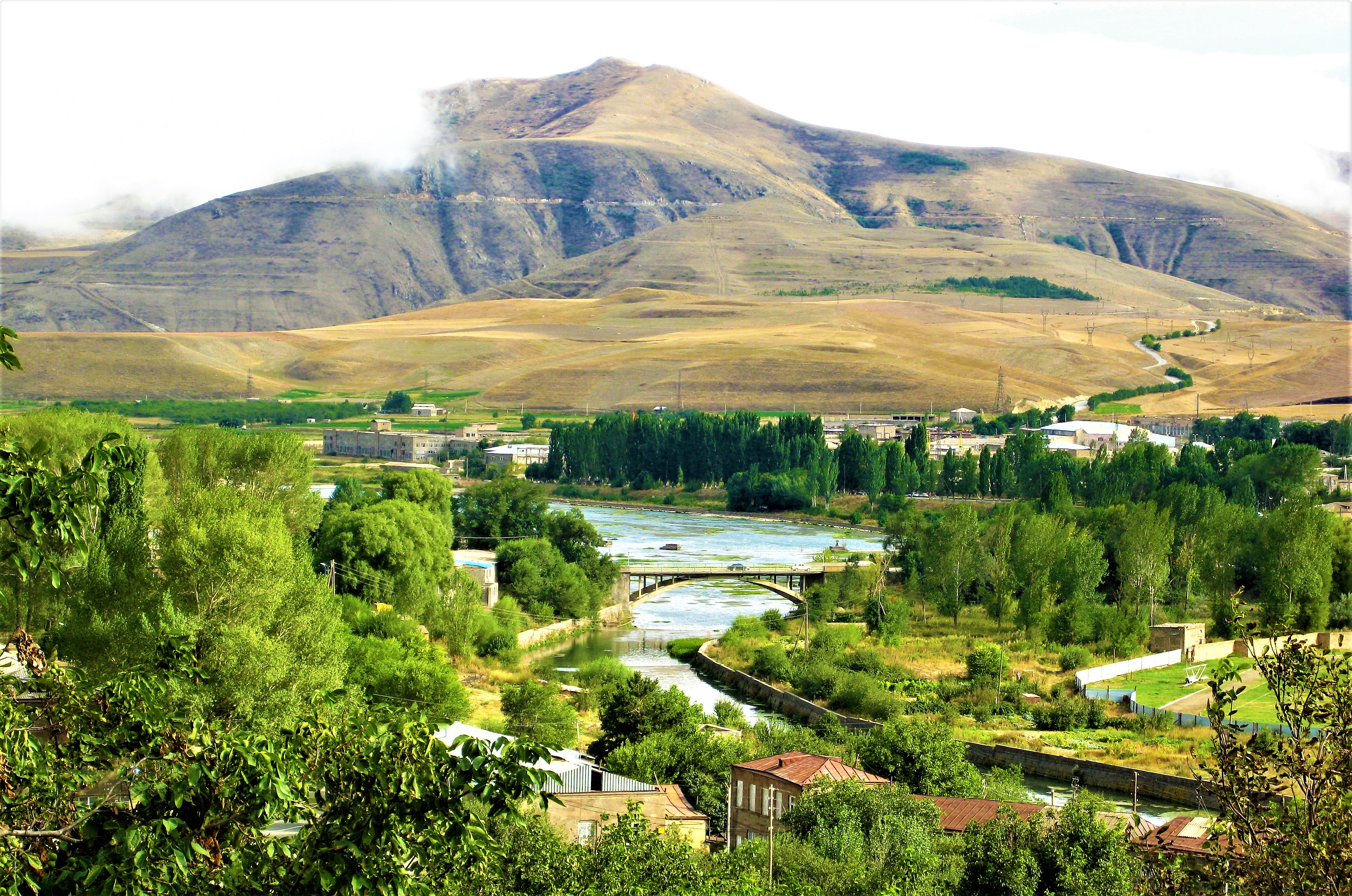
Vorotan River in Sisian

Sisian is located in the southeast of Armenia, in the mountainous region of historic Syunik. Surrounded by the Zangezur Mountains from the west and the Bargushat Mountains from the south, the town is situated on the bank of the Vorotan River, at an average height of 1600 above sea level, only 6 km south of the main highway that connects Armenia with Iran and the region of Nagorno-Karabakh. The Sisian River joins the Vorotan at the southern border of the town.

The Sisian mountain pass north of the town is at a height of 2345 meters, connecting the Vorotan plain at the east with the plains of Nakhichevan at the west. The 3563 meters-high Mount Ughtasar is overlooking at Sisian from the north, while the Mount Mets Ishkhanasar (3552 meters) is located 13 km east of the town.

=== Climate ===
Sisian has a humid continental climate (Dfb/Dwb according to the Köppen climate classification system). The average temperature in January is -6°C and +18°C in July. The annual precipitation level is around 489 mm.

Climate data for Sisian (1991-2020 normals, extremes 1981-2025)
Month	Jan	Feb	Mar	Apr	May	Jun	Jul	Aug	Sep	Oct	Nov	Dec	Year
Record high °C (°F)	14.6 (58.3)	14.5 (58.1)	22.1 (71.8)	27.0 (80.6)	29.0 (84.2)	32.9 (91.2)	36.0 (96.8)	36.0 (96.8)	35.4 (95.7)	27.5 (81.5)	24.3 (75.7)	19.2 (66.6)	36.0 (96.8)
Daily mean °C (°F)	−3.4 (25.9)	−2.2 (28.0)	2.4 (36.3)	7.3 (45.1)	11.8 (53.2)	15.8 (60.4)	18.4 (65.1)	18.3 (64.9)	14.5 (58.1)	9.1 (48.4)	2.7 (36.9)	−1.6 (29.1)	7.8 (45.9)
Record low °C (°F)	−26.9 (−16.4)	−31.0 (−23.8)	−28.9 (−20.0)	−18.2 (−0.8)	−6.2 (20.8)	0.8 (33.4)	3.9 (39.0)	3.1 (37.6)	−2.0 (28.4)	−9.1 (15.6)	−20.8 (−5.4)	−25.7 (−14.3)	−31.0 (−23.8)
Average precipitation mm (inches)	16.2 (0.64)	22.4 (0.88)	34.6 (1.36)	57.6 (2.27)	70.6 (2.78)	50.7 (2.00)	30.4 (1.20)	15.7 (0.62)	28.1 (1.11)	32.1 (1.26)	25.5 (1.00)	19.2 (0.76)	403.1 (15.88)
Average precipitation days (≥ 1.0 mm)	3.8	5.2	7.1	9.6	11.6	7.5	4.2	2.4	3.9	5.3	5	4.4	70
Average relative humidity (%)	73.2	72.6	71.6	70.5	70.7	69.3	66.9	67.1	70.5	72.2	73.4	73.3	70.9
Mean monthly sunshine hours	153.8	146.6	165.3	174.9	236	294.3	309.3	299.9	252.3	198.7	157.5	146.3	2,534.9
Source 1: NOAA
Source 2: Ogimet (November record high)

== Demographics ==
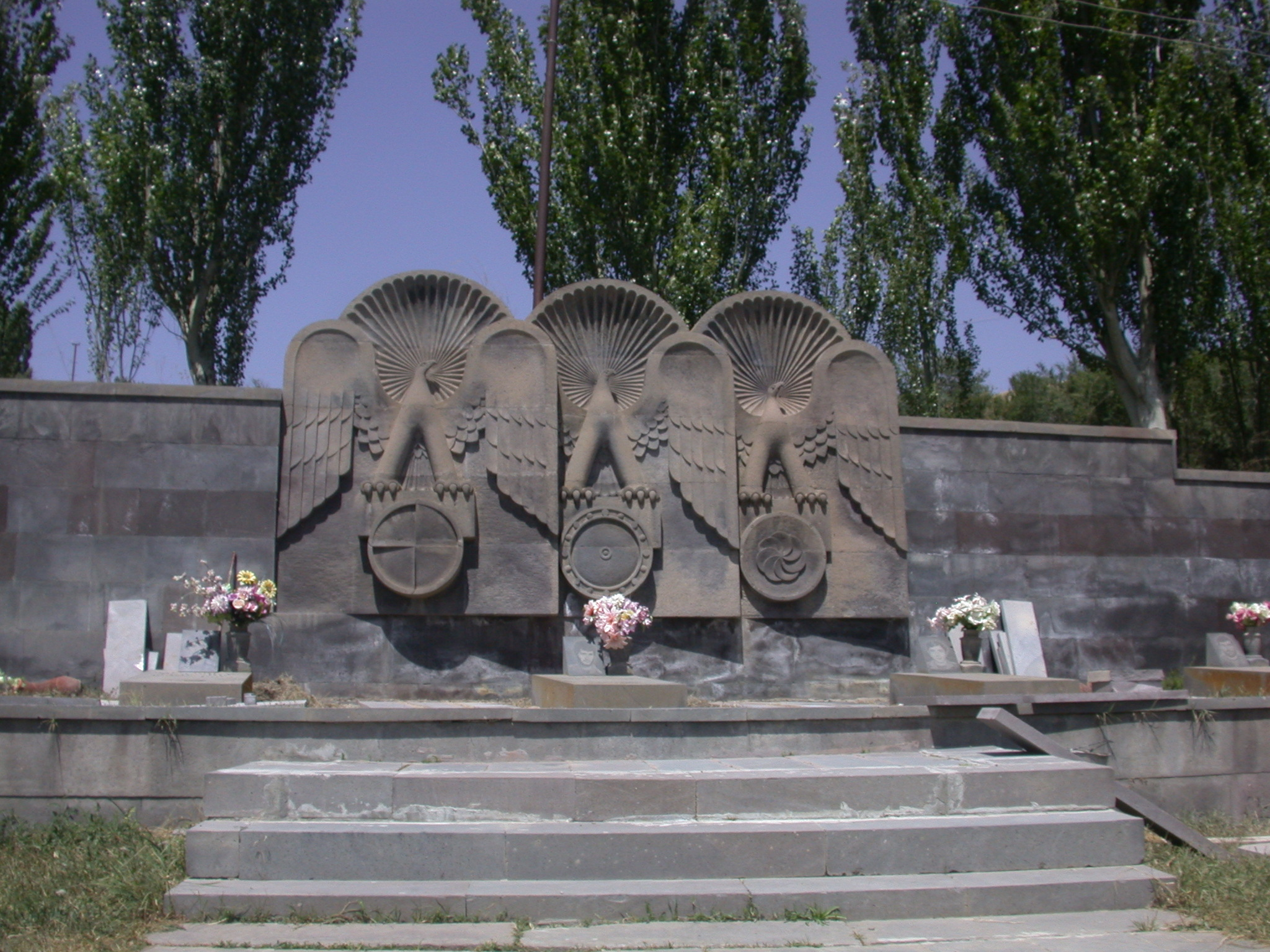
Artsakh war victims memorial

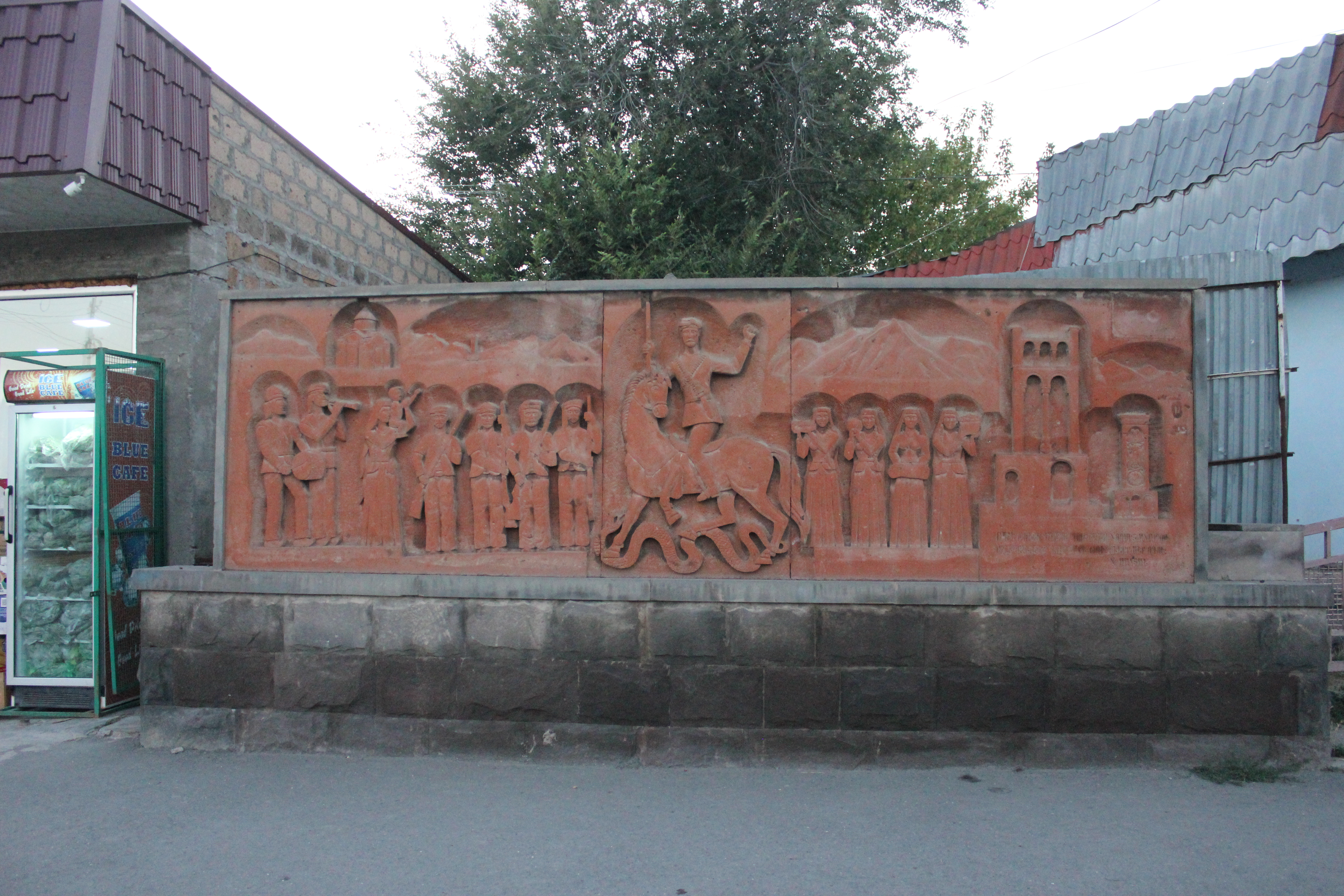

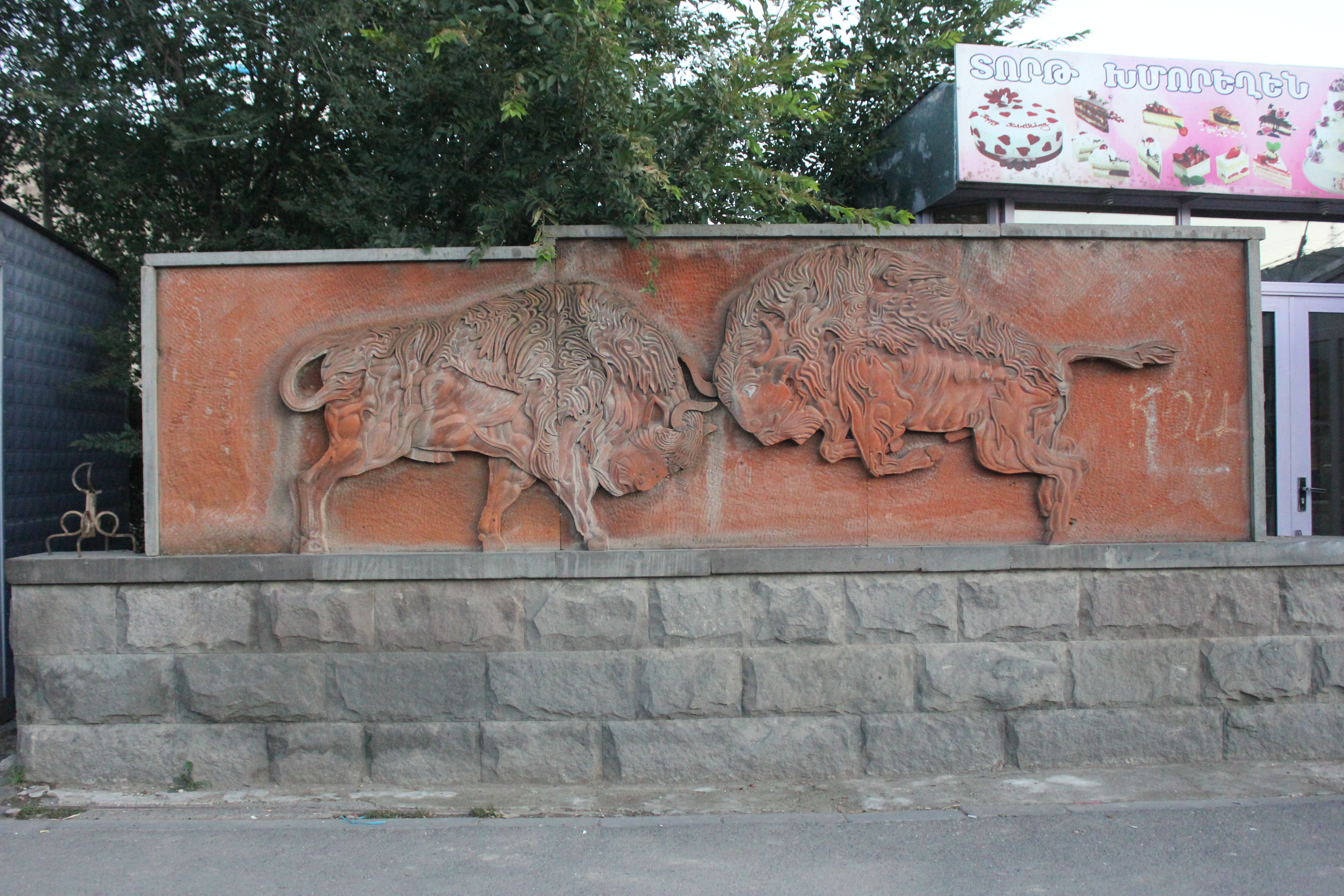
A sculpture of the 70th anniversary of Sisian's self-defense battles

The town has a population of ethnic Armenians who belong to the Armenian Apostolic Church with the 7th-century church of Saint Gregory of Sisavan being the main church of the town. It is regulated by the Diocese of Syunik based in Goris.

The population timeline of Sisian since 1831 is as follows:

Year	Population
1831	116
1897	1,266
1926	1,186
1931	1,635
1939	2,215
1941	1,473
1951	3,016
1959	3,859
1969	6,778
1975	9,100
1979	10,373
1984	12,487
1989	15,292
2001	16,843
2004	16,800
2011	14,894

Healthcare is served by the Sisian Medical Center. The Sisian Military Hospital is based in the nearby village of Aghitu.

== Culture ==
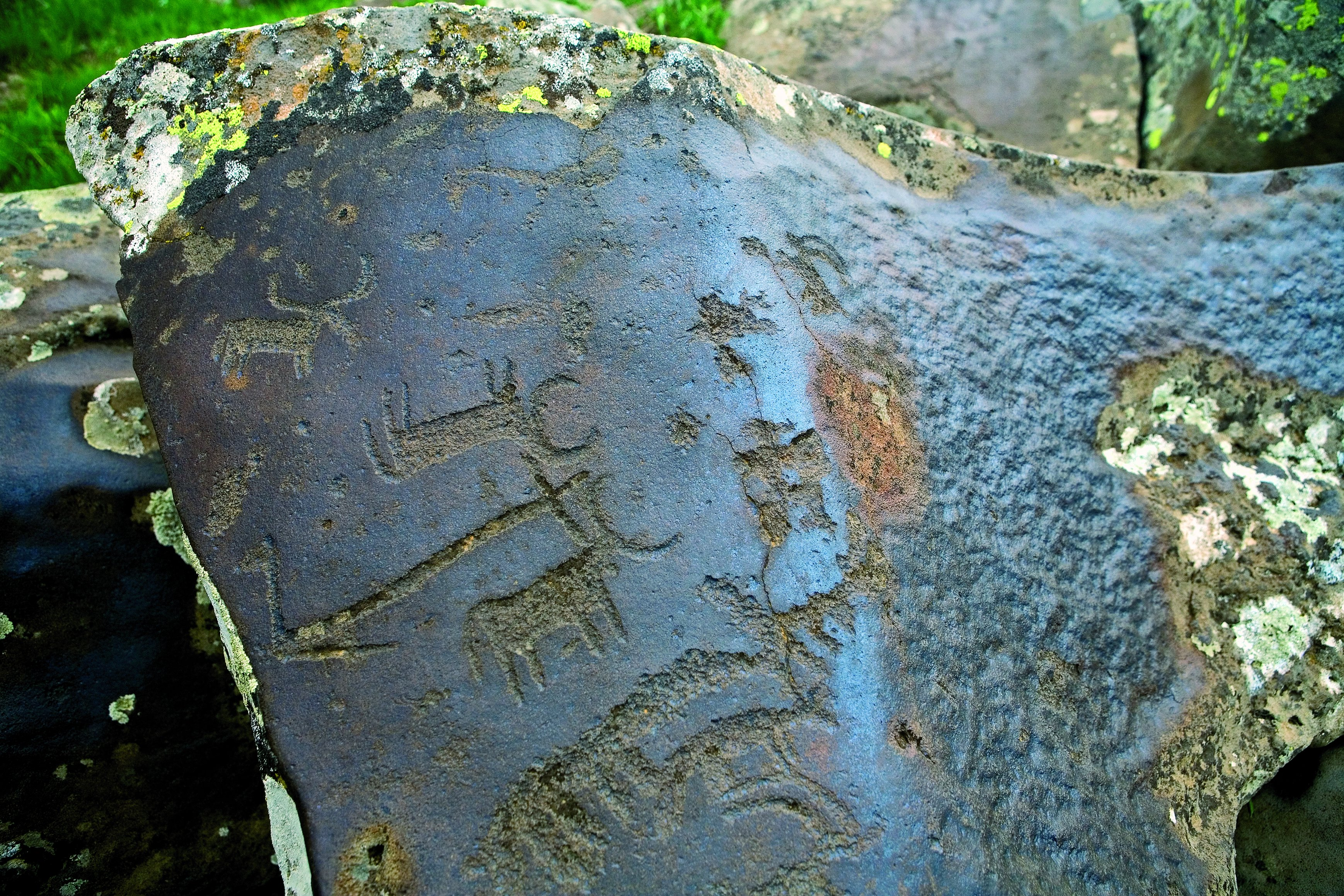
Bull petroglyphs at Ughtasar

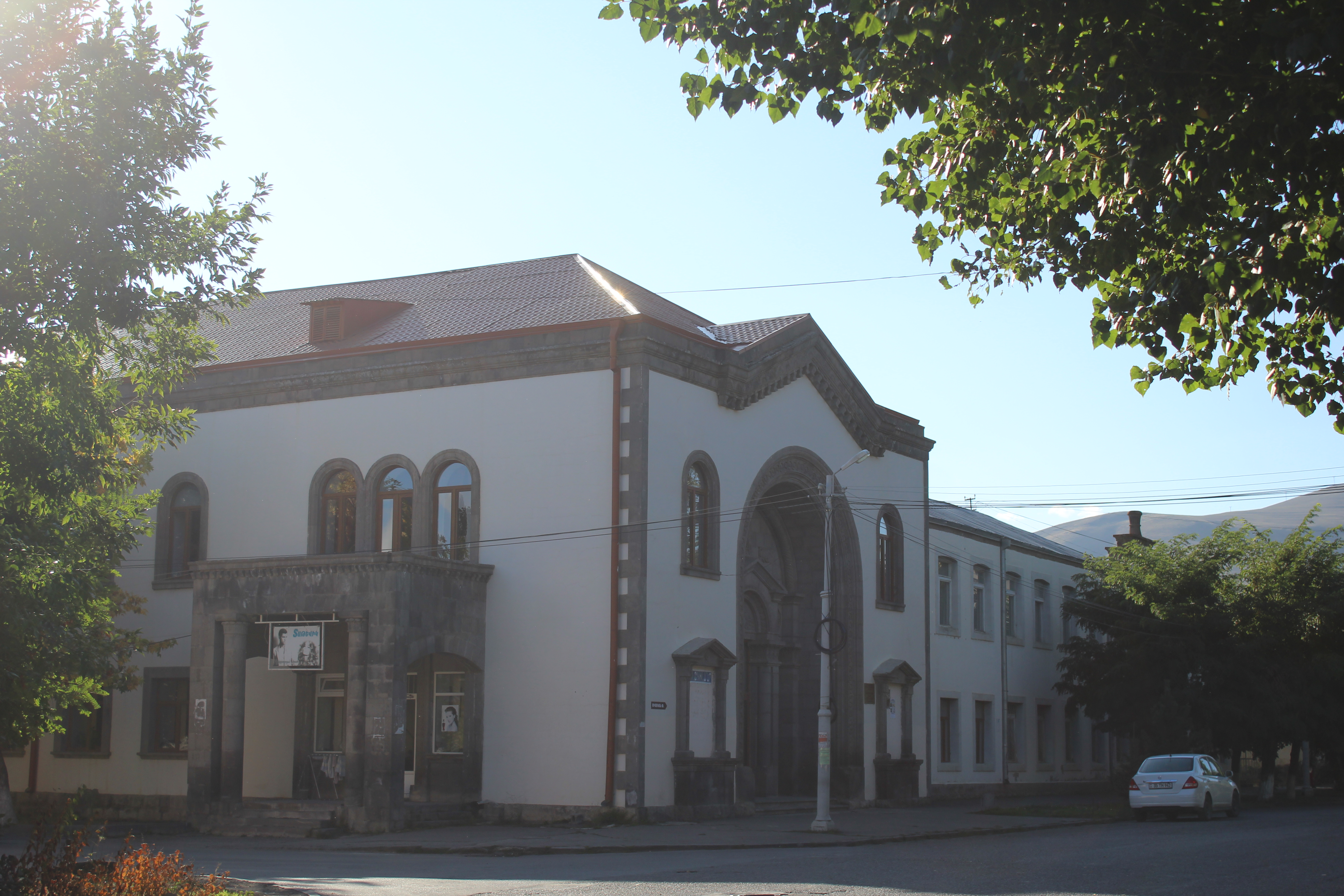
Sisian House of Culture

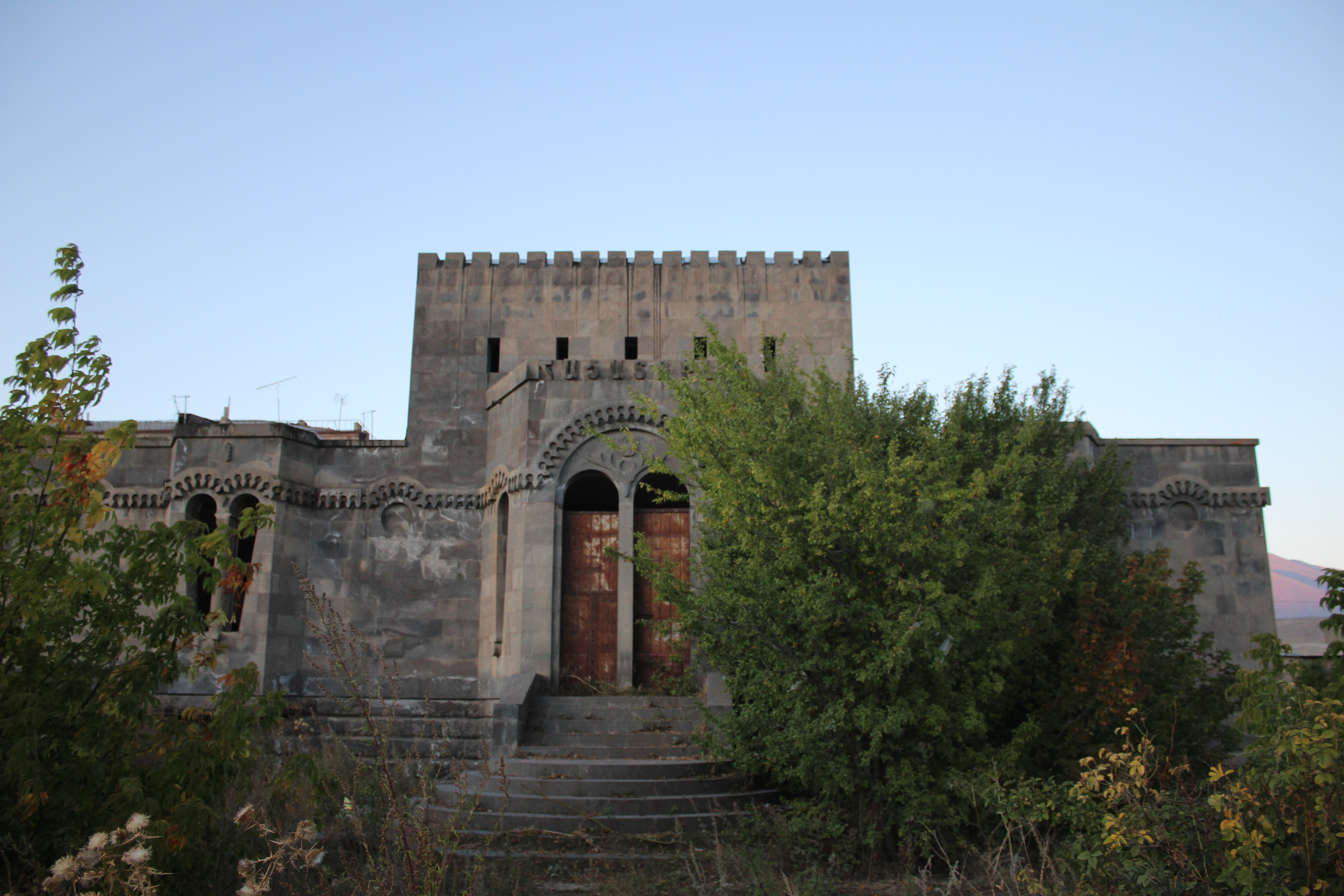
Old Sisian baking house

Sisian is surrounded by many historical sites dating back to the Paleolithic Age as well as the early Bronze Age. The Ughtasar Petroglyphs, one of the largest ancient petroglyph sites in the world which date back to the 12th millennium BC, are located a few kilometers north of Sisian. The Zorats Karer archaeological site—often referred to in international tourist lore as the Armenian Stonehenge—of the 3rd millennium BC is located 3 km north of Sisian. The remains of a Bronze Age cyclopean fortress are found at the northeastern edge of the town, while 2 other medieval fortresses are found at the west and the northeast of the town. The 7th-century Saint Gregory Church of Sisavan (also known as Surp Hovhannes) is among the major historic landmarks of the town, built in 670-689.

The Sisian History Museum named after Nicholas Adontz has operated since its inauguration in 1989, covering the history of Sisian and the surrounding region. The town is also home to a public library opened in 1935, the Hamo Sahyan house of culture, the Sisian branch of the National Gallery of Armenia opened in 1978.

The music academy of the town is operating since 1960, with around 175 students as of 2017. as well as an academy of fine arts. The town has also an academy of fine arts and children's art, operating since the Soviet days, named after Z. Khachatryan.

The town has 2 newspapers: Vorotan and Vorotanian Ghoghanjner.

== Transportation ==
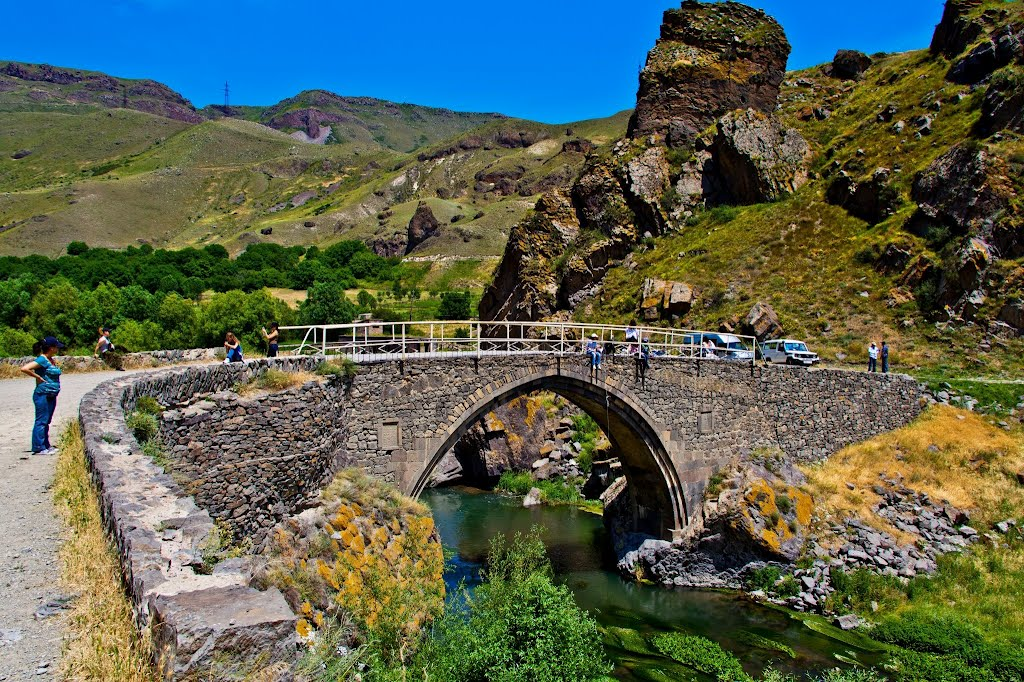
Melik Tang's Bridge near Sisian, constructed in 1855

The Yerevan-Stepanakert highway (M-2 Motorway) that links Armenia with the Republic of Artsakh is only 6 km northeast of Sisian. The Sisian airstrip was opened in 1982 adjacent to the highway. The town is connected with the surrounding villages and towns with a network of regional roads, paved through the mountains passes.

== Economy ==
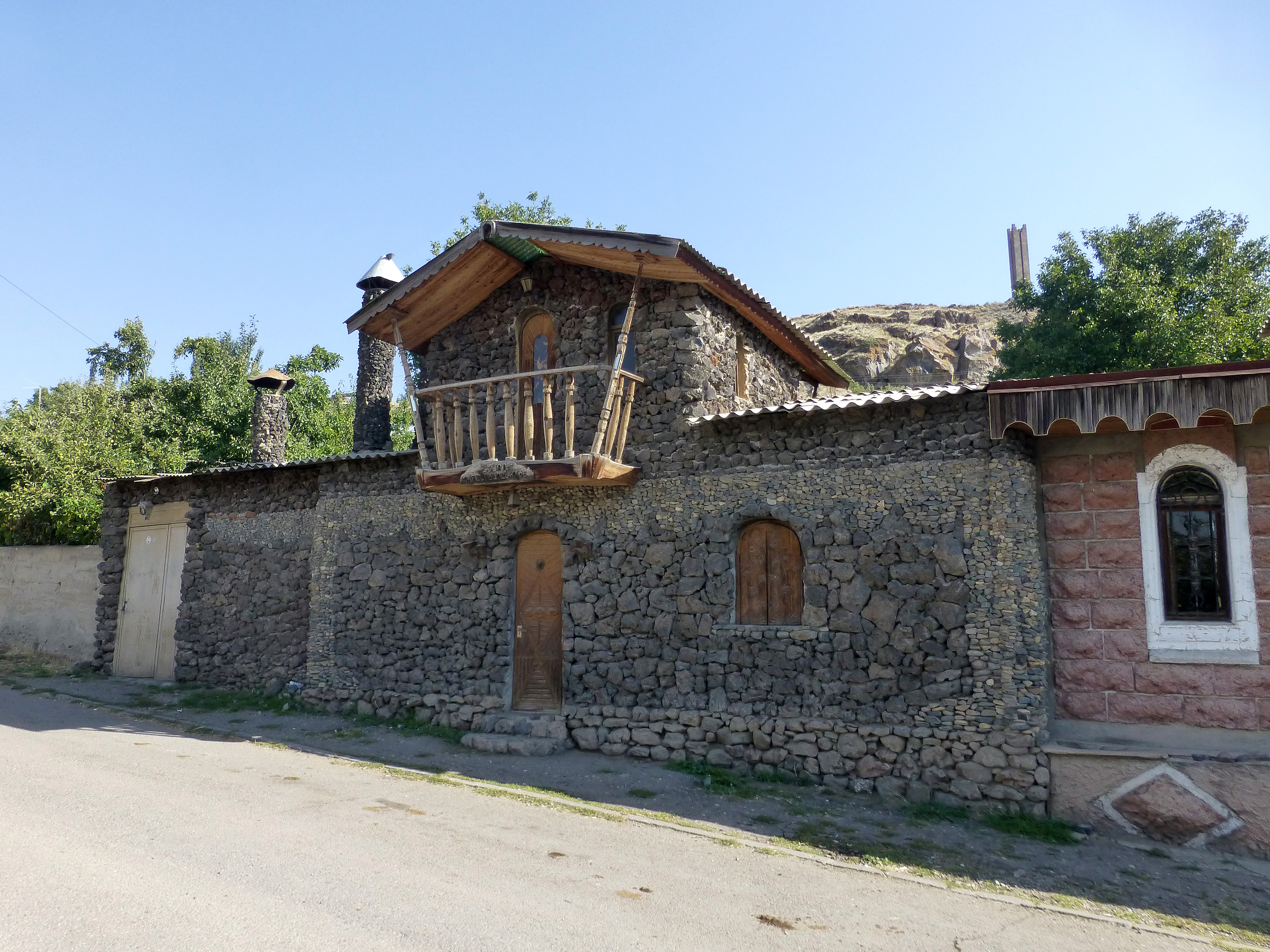
A traditional café

The economy of Sisian was greatly boosted with the inauguration of the Vorotan Cascade in the early 1960s. Many industrial plants and service firms were opened by the Soviet government, including the production of building materials, reinforced concrete, textile and medical equipment. The industry was enlarged with the foundation of the sewing factory, the Armenian rug production unit, and the dairy products plant. Agriculture was also promoted during the Soviet days, with the establishment of many poultry and pig farms.

Following the independence of Armenia and the resulted economic crisis, most of the industrial and agricultural firms of the Soviet period were forced to close.

Currently, many plants for the production of building materials, furniture and canned food are operating in the town, including the Sisian Shik mining plant, Bazalt-M plant for building materials (since 2009), and Sisian Ceramics plant.

With its ancient archaeological sites and attractive nature, tourism is an important sector for Sisian and the region. The town is served with many traditional boutique hotels, bed and breakfasts, restaurants and pubs.

== Education ==
As of 2017, Sisian is home to 5 public schools as well as a number of pre-school kindergartens.

The Sisian branch of the Armenian National Agrarian University was opened in 2004, with seven specialties: agronomy, milk and dairy technology, land management and cadastral survey, economics and management of agrarian production, agrifood system accountancy and audit, veterinary sanitary expertise, and animal husbandry.

The Sisian Adult Education Center is a non-profit organization offering non-formal educational and development programs for the population of the town.

== Sport ==
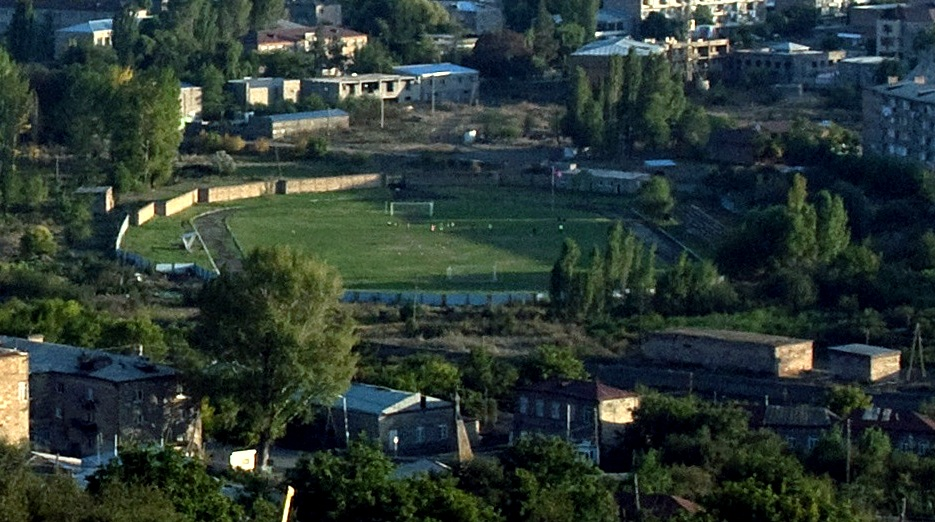
Sisian School Football Stadium

Football, volleyball, futsal, handball, weightlifting, boxing, wrestling and chess are among the popular sports in Sisian. The children and youth sport school of the towns was opened in 1961 by the efforts of volleyball player Manvel Amirkhanyan. Designated for around 500 young trainees, the school was entirely reconstructed and opened in March 2017.

The town is also home to a chess school as well as a football school operating since 2011.

The Sisian Football School Stadium was constructed during 2017. The stadium has an up-to-date artificial turf and a seating capacity of 500 spectators.

== International relations ==
=== Twin towns – Sister cities ===
Sisian is twinned with:

- Nea Smyrni, Greece
- Slutsk, Belarus
- Montélimar, France

== Notable people ==
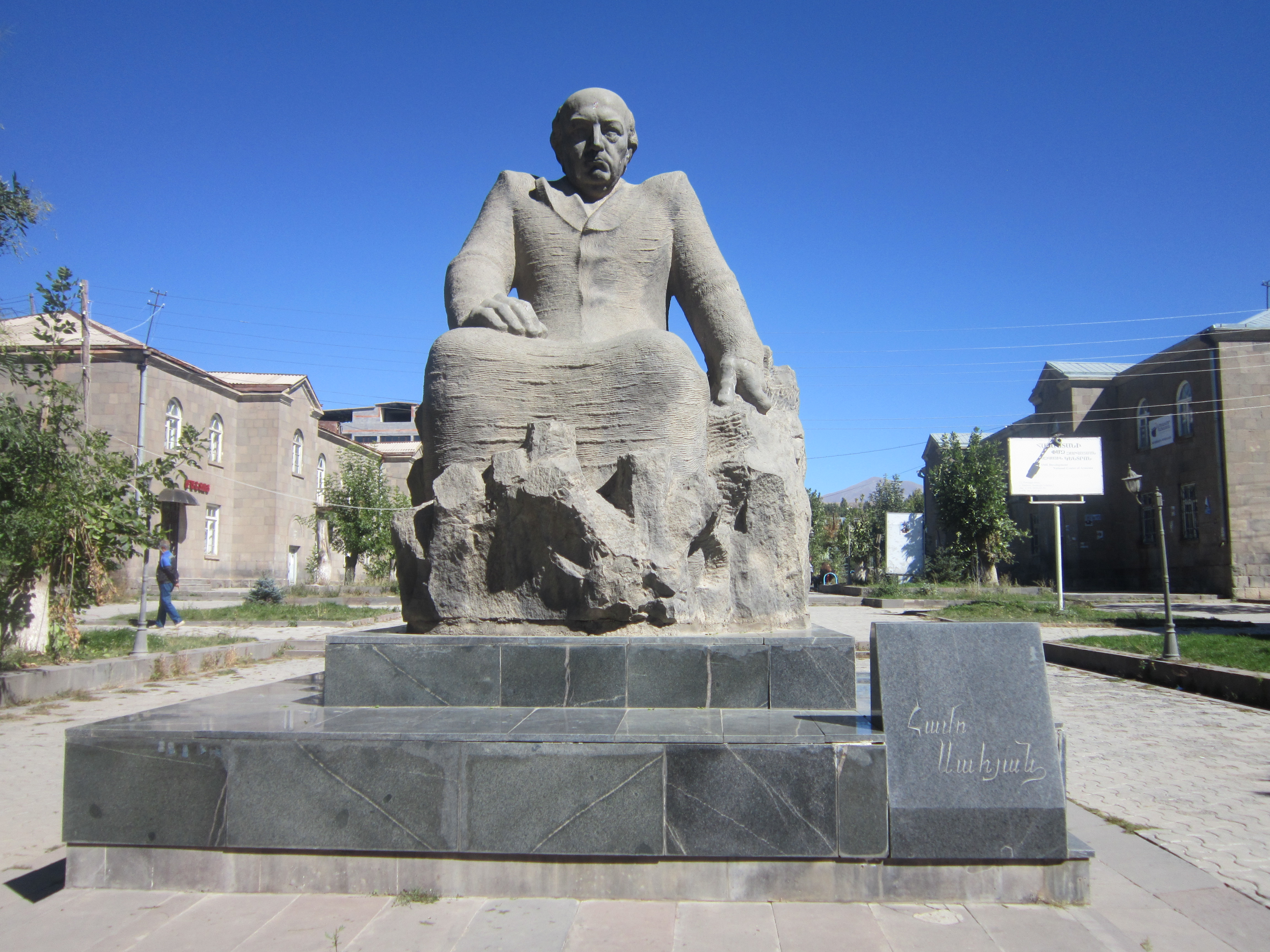
Monument to poet Hamo Sahyan in Sisian

- Israel Ori (1658–1711), nobleman and diplomat, likely born in Sisian
- Hamo Sahyan (1914–1993), poet, born in the village of Lor in the current-day Sisian Municipality, worked in Sisian 1937–1938
- Ashot Avagyan (born 1958), artist
- Vahagn Khachaturyan, (born 1959), politician and current president of Armenia

== See also ==
- Zangezur Mountains
- Ughtasar Petroglyphs
- Zorats Karer
- Kingdom of Syunik
