= Ərəfsə =

- Municipality
- Location within Azerbaijan
- Coordinates: 39°17′31″N 45°47′05″E
- Country: Azerbaijan
- Autonomous republic: Nakhchivan
- District: Julfa

Population (2005)
  - Total: 940
- Time zone: UTC+4 (AZT)

Ərəfsə (also, Arafsa and Aravsa) is a village and municipality in the Julfa District of Nakhchivan, Azerbaijan. It is located 55 km in the north from the district center, on the right bank of the Alinjachay River, on the slope of the Zangezur ridge. Its population is busy with vine-growing, grain-growing and animal husbandry. There are a secondary school, a cultural house, two libraries, a communication center, and a medical center in the village. It has a population of 940.

There exist the Daş Körpü and the Xarabalıq settlements of the Middle Ages in the north-east from the Arafsa village.

== Etymology ==
The name of the Arafsa village is related with the name of Turkic ərəfsəli (arafsali) tribe. They were one of the branch of the Turkic Kengerli. Some sources of the 18th-19th centuries mention the name of ərəfsəli generation among Kengerli tribes living in the Nakhchivan. During the rule of the Iranian ruler Nadir Shah Afshar (1736-47), from the administrative aspect ərəfsəli tribes were ruled by the lawyers and elders who came out from the among own tribes in Nakhchivan. Ərəfsəli tribes who lived in a series of villages of Nakhchivan and Daralayez uyezd were engaged in cattle-breeding. The name of the Ərəfsəli (Arafsali) village of the Sisian province of Armenia also is related from the name of the ərəfsəli tribe.

As it is located near the border with Armenia, it has also been referred to in Armenian literature as Arevek (Armenian: Արեւէք, romanized: Arewēk’).

== Historical and archaeological monuments ==
=== Daş Körpü (Stone Bridge) ===
Daş Körpü (Stone Bridge) is an Azerbaijan architectural monument of the Middle Ages in the north-east from the Arafsa village of Julfa rayon, on the Alinjachay River. It also known as "Julfa Bridge". A Photo and dimensions of the bridge were taken during the researching works of the archaeological expedition of Nakhchivan Regional Scientific Center of the Azerbaijan National Academy of Sciences in this area (1991). The bridge is in the crown form and was built from the river and mountain stones in various sizes; its arch was built at the edges from the hewed white stone, and in the middle from the river stone. The bridge which built on the rock at a height of 1.5 m from the river bed was built on the foundation at a height of 0.8 m from both sides. The width of the bridge is 7 m at the lower part, the height is 5 meters up to the stone foundation, and 6.5 meters down to the river. According to the techniques of construction, it is supposed that the bridge has been built in 16th-17th centuries. The Stone Bridge has been restored and reconstructed in 1998.

=== Xarabalıq (Kharabalyg) ===
Xarabalıq (Kharabalyg) is a settlement of the Middle Ages in the north-east from the Arafsa village of Julfa rayon. It is limited by Gəvik River in the north-west, and in the south-east by the deep canyon which Alinjachay River flows. Its area is 1600 m². The remains of the destroyed building in the northern part of the settlement are clearly visible. Its west side has remained relatively unharmed (the fragments of the clay pot in pink-colored which is typical for the Middle Ages were found). Cultural layer is very little preserved (in some places thickness reaches in 0.5 m). Surface materials are negligible; the bowl and the jug-type pot fractures were found. The Xarabalıq settlement belongs to the 12th–17th centuries.

=== Arafsa ===
Arafsa is a settlement of the late Bronze and early Iron Age near the same named village of Julfa rayon, on the right bank of the Alinjachay River. Its area is 5 ha. During the archaeological excavations (1926, A. Alekperov) samples of the monochrome-painted clay pot of the 2nd millennium of BC have been found. Later (1974, V. Aliyev) it was determined that there is the settlement of the 2nd millennium of BC in the Arafsa village. Here, fragments of obsidian have been obtained, fragments of the monochrome-painted and polished black clay pot, and stone tools (grain stones, graters and pestles).

=== Arafsa Pir ===
Arafsa Pir is a sanctuary of the Middle Ages in the Arafsa village of Julfa rayon. It is located on the top of the hill on the left bank of the Alinjachay River. It hase two large rooms and balconies to the south and east sides. The main visiting object is the grave in the center of the relatively large room. The exact cause why this place is sacred is unknown. There are considerations about the existence of the Khaneghah in the place of the sanctuary.
