= Lor, Armenia =

Lor Լոր
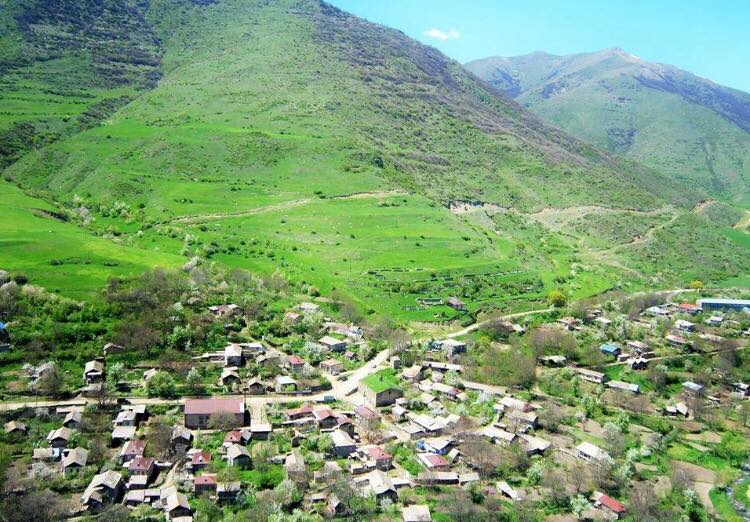

- Location within Armenia Location within Syunik Province
- Coordinates: 39°24′45″N 46°07′35″E
- Country: Armenia
- Province: Syunik
- Municipality: Sisian

Area
  - Total: 17.97 km^{2} (6.94 sq mi)

Population (2011)
  - Total: 365
  - Density: 20.3/km^{2} (52.6/sq mi)
- Time zone: UTC+4 (AMT)

Lor (Armenian: Լոր) is a village in the Sisian Municipality of the Syunik Province in Armenia. The village is home to the house-museum of Hamo Sahyan, a famous Armenian poet native to Lor.

== Demographics ==
Statistical Committee of Armenia reported its population as 420 in 2010, up from 355 at the 2001 census.

== Gallery ==
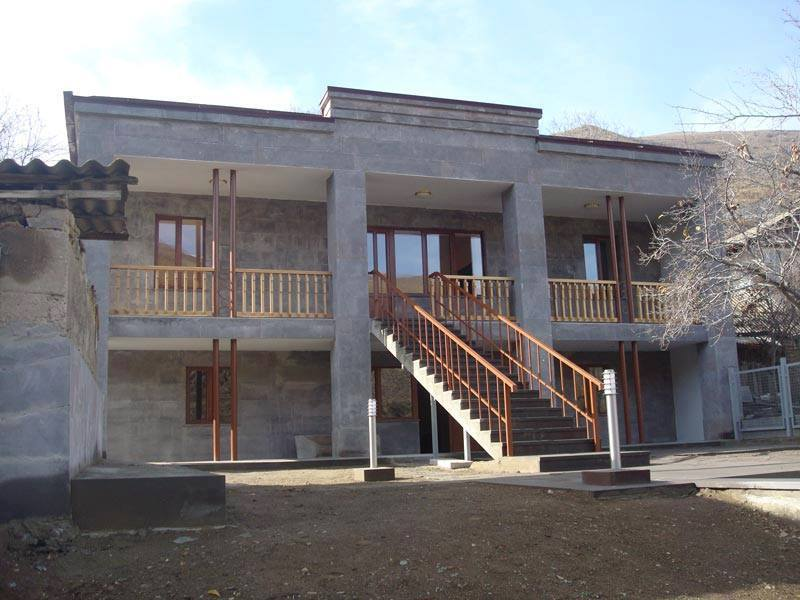
Hamo Sahyan Museum

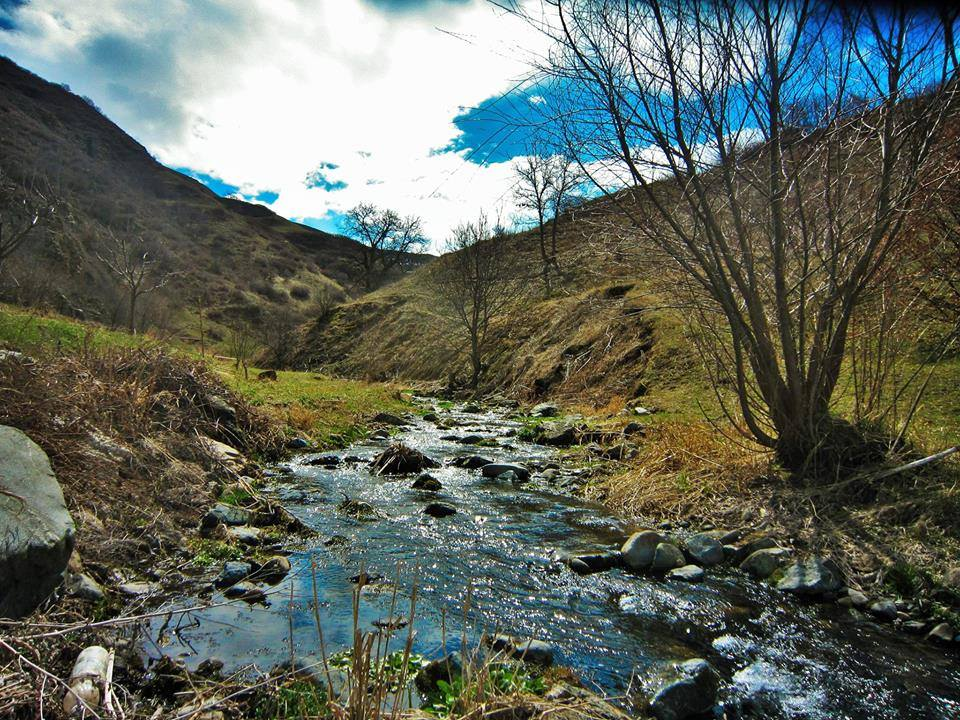
Scenery

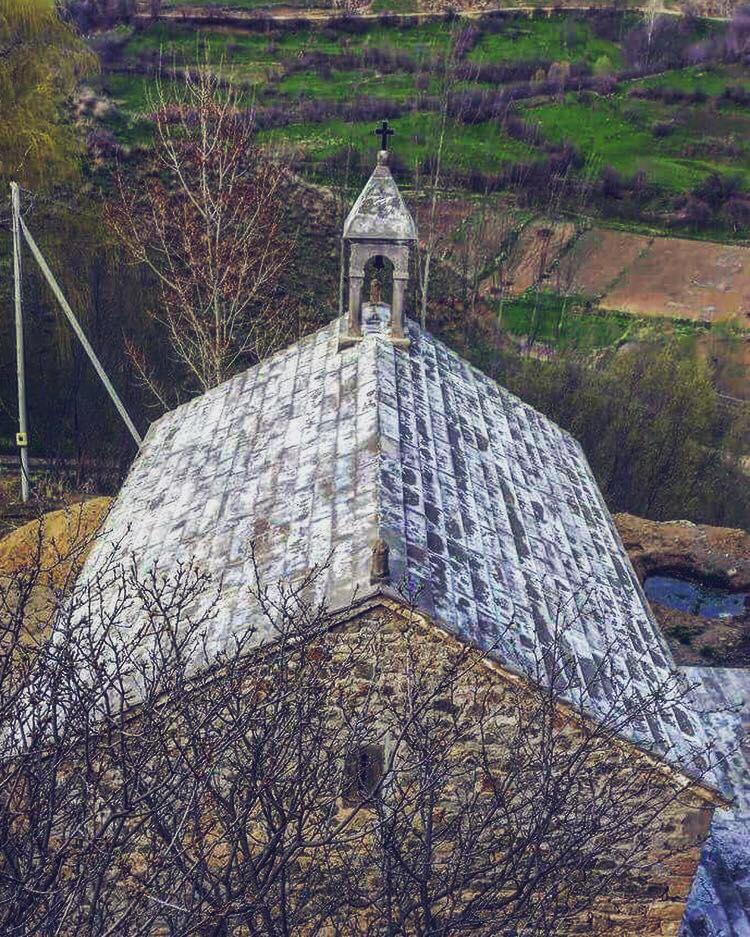
St. John's Church

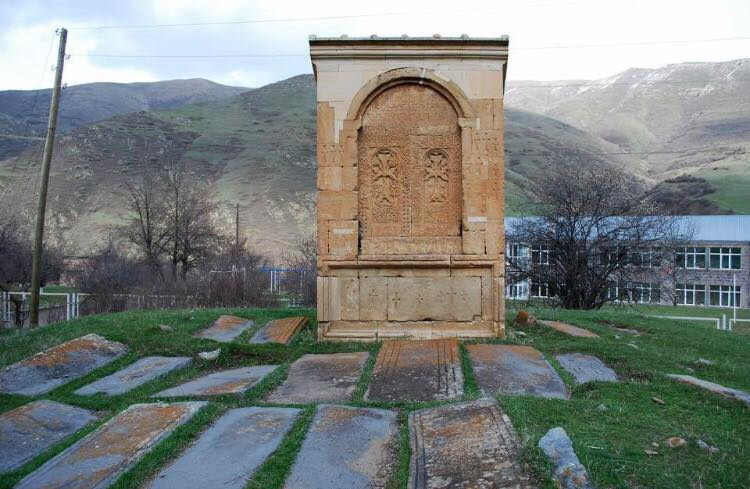
Monument to Prince Lorik

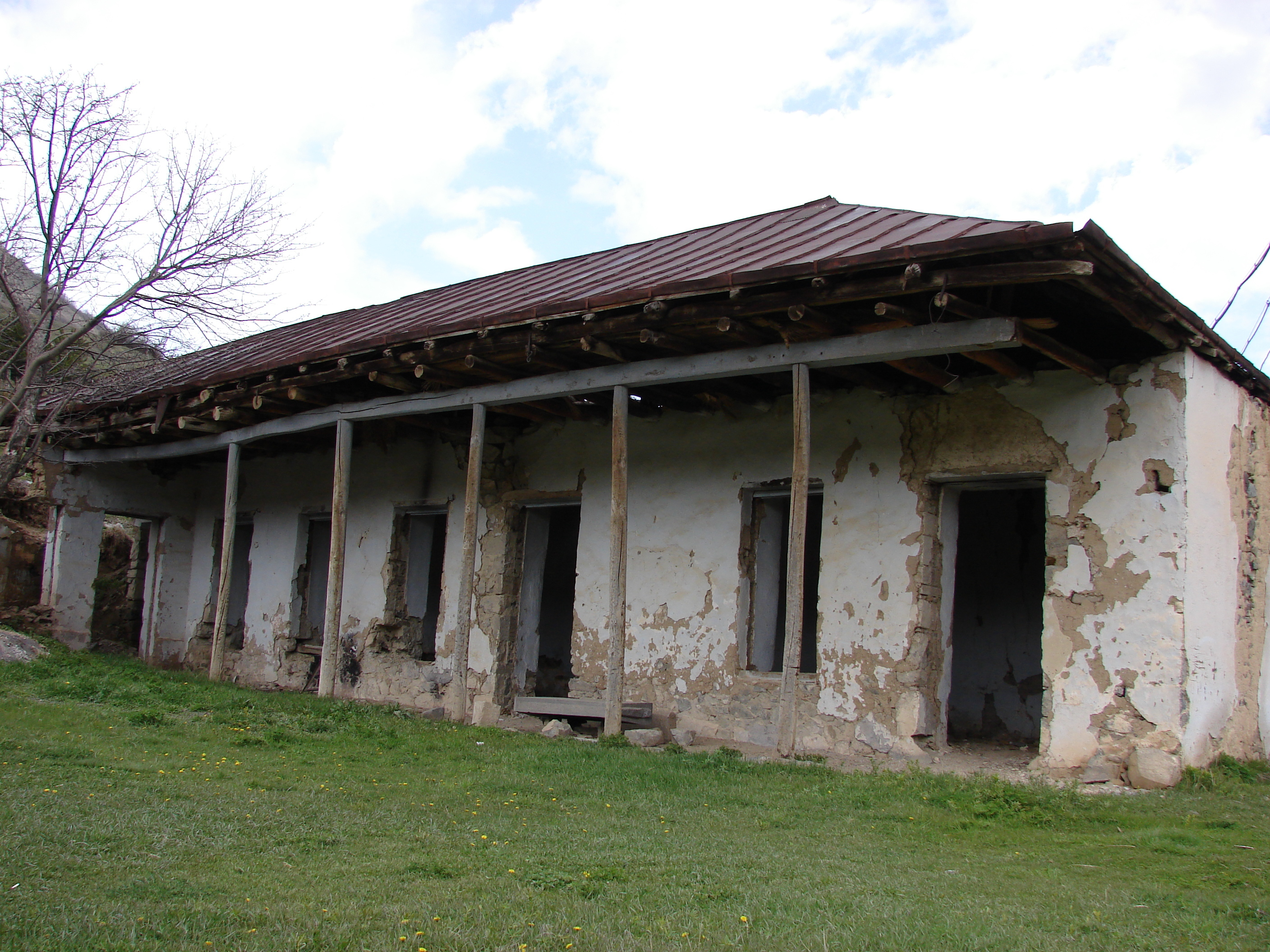
The old school of Lor
