= Milax, Azerbaijan =

Milax
- Municipality
- Location within Azerbaijan
- Coordinates: 39°16′13″N 45°44′16″E
- Country: Azerbaijan
- Autonomous republic: Nakhchivan
- District: Julfa

Population (2005)
  - Total: 924
- Time zone: UTC+4 (AZT)

Milax (also, Milakh) is a village and municipality in the Julfa District of Nakhchivan, Azerbaijan. It is located 55 km in the north from the district center, on the right bank of the Alinjachay River, on the slope of the Zangezur ridge. Its population is busy with farming and animal husbandry. There are secondary school, cultural house, kindergarten, library, communication branch, and a medical center in the village. It has a population of 924. The Zoğala settlement and necropolis of the ancient and Middle Ages were discovered in the north-west from the village.

== Etymology ==
The village was formed out on the place called Milakh as a result of the resettlement of families who moved out from the Gazanchy village during the Armenian-Muslim conflict in 1905. The name of the village means "the flat place, the plain, the wasteland".

== Historical and archaeological monuments ==
=== Zoğala (Zoghala) I ===
Zoğala I, New Zoghala - the ancient and early medieval settlement 6 km in the north-west from the Milakh village of the Julfa rayon, on the right bank of Alinjachay River. It is limited by the Zoghalachay River in the south west and by the deep valleys in the north-east. Two bronze griffins were found from the place of residence (1932). The excavation was carried out and was found stands of the pillar (1987). There were found the samples of clay pot in pink-colored, fragments of the one piece bowl-type container. At the time, the found stands of the pillar of the first Middle Ages were not saved. One of the bronze griffins is kept in the Hermitage (St. Petersburg), the other one is kept at the Museum of Azerbaijan Literature named after Nizami of Azerbaijan National Academy of Sciences. It was noted that Griffins were throne leg. The life in the settlement existed from 4th century of BC till 7th century of AD, in subsequent periods, it has recovered and continued till the late Middle Ages.

=== Zoğala II ===
Zoğala II, the old Zoğala - the settlement of the late Middle Ages not far from the Zoğala I settlement, in the north-west from the Milakh village of Julfa rayon, on the left bank of Zoghalachay River. It is limited by the deep valley in the east, by the Zoghalachay River in the south-west, and in the north by the mountain range. The exploration research works were carried out (1987). The buildings destroyed, in its place are remained the square and oval pits. The buildings, mostly built of stone. The cultural layer in 0.5 –1 m thick is well maintained. It is assumed that the monument belongs to the 16th-18th centuries.

=== Zoğala Necropolis ===
Zoğala Necropolis - the archaeological monument of the Middle Ages near the Zoğala I settlement, in the north-west of the Milakh village of Julfa rayon. Its area is limited by deep canyon in the north-west and south-east. The graves in the necropolis are in the direction of the east west. None of them gravestones were kept. It is supposed that the monument belongs to the 17th-19th centuries.
