= Ashot Avagyan =

Armenian painter

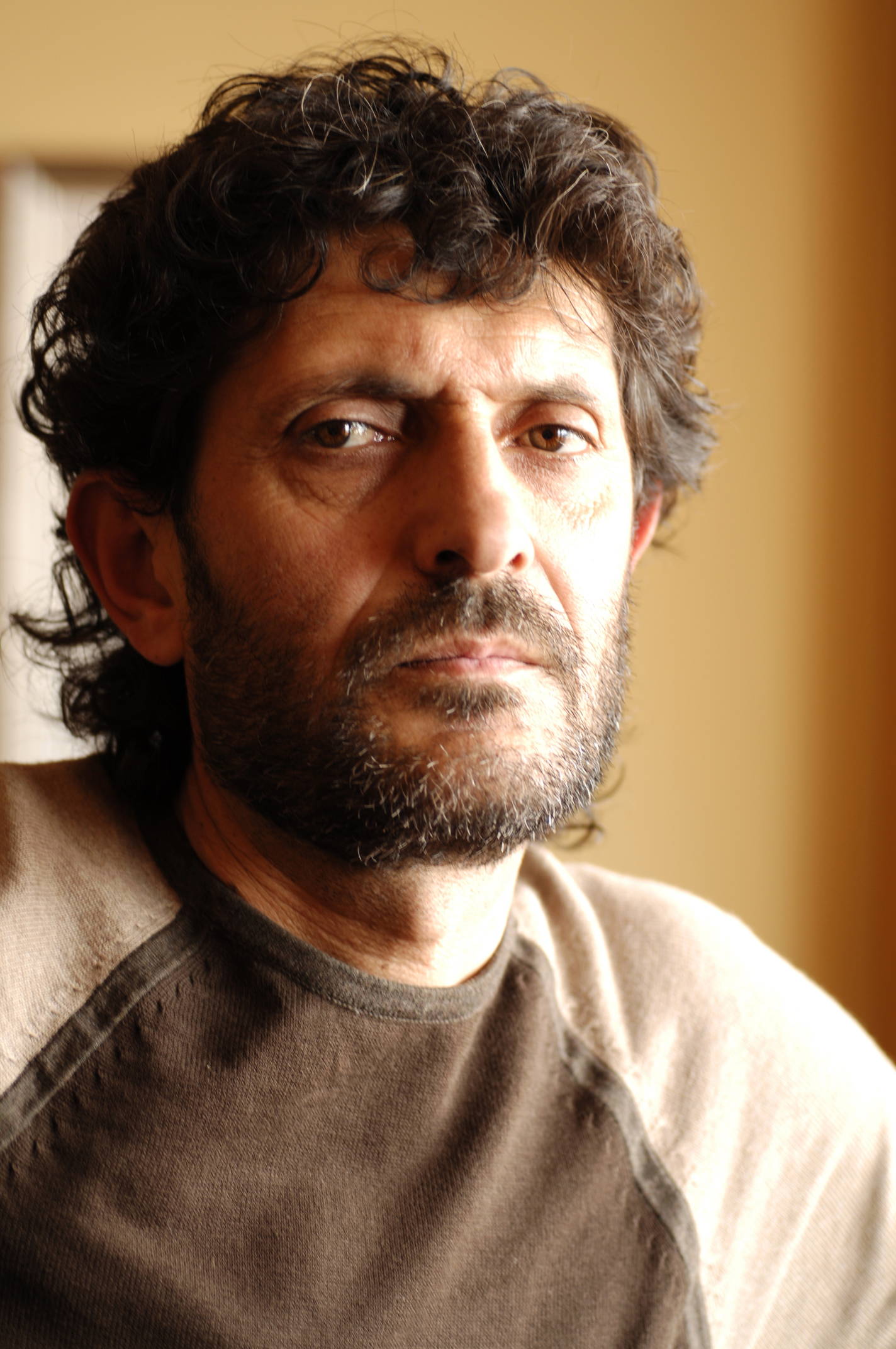
- Ashot Avagyan in 2007, photo by German Avagyan
- Born: May 20, 1958; Sisian, Syunik, Armenian SSR, Soviet Union
- Education: Yerevan Art College after P. Terlemezyan, Yerevan
- Awards: State Prize 2013
- Website: avagyanashot.art

Ashot Avagyan (Armenian: Աշոտ Ավագյան; born May 20, 1958) is a modern Armenian artist who lives and works in Sisian, Armenia.

The cornerstone of Avagyan's artistic work is the cultural heritage of his homeland Sisian and Syunik. Iconography from Neolithic petroglyphs and medieval Armenian gravestones are present in Avagyan's works on canvas, while ancient tales, rituals, and their interpretations and ancient local monuments (Zorats Karer, Portakar, Ukhtasar petroglyphs) are integrated into his performances.

Ashot Avagyan was awarded the state prize in 2013 for the fresco Mashtots, located in the symposium hall of the newly built subsidiary building of the Mashtots Matenadaran.

Besides artistic work, Avagyan taught fine arts at Sisian Children's Art School after Z. Khachatryan from 1981 to 2016. From 2010 to 2018 Ashot was curating works of the megalithic site ''Zorats Karer historical-cultural reserve''.

Since 1988 he has been actively engaged in sociopolitical activities of Armenia, particularly Sisian. He was involved in local politics, elected as a member of the City Council of Elders, and has been a member of the Sisian committee of the Armenian Revolutionary Federation since 1990․ He participated in the First Nagorno-Karabakh War, the 2016 Nagorno-Karbakh conflict, and the Second Nagorno-Karabakh War as a member of the Sisakan volunteer detachment.

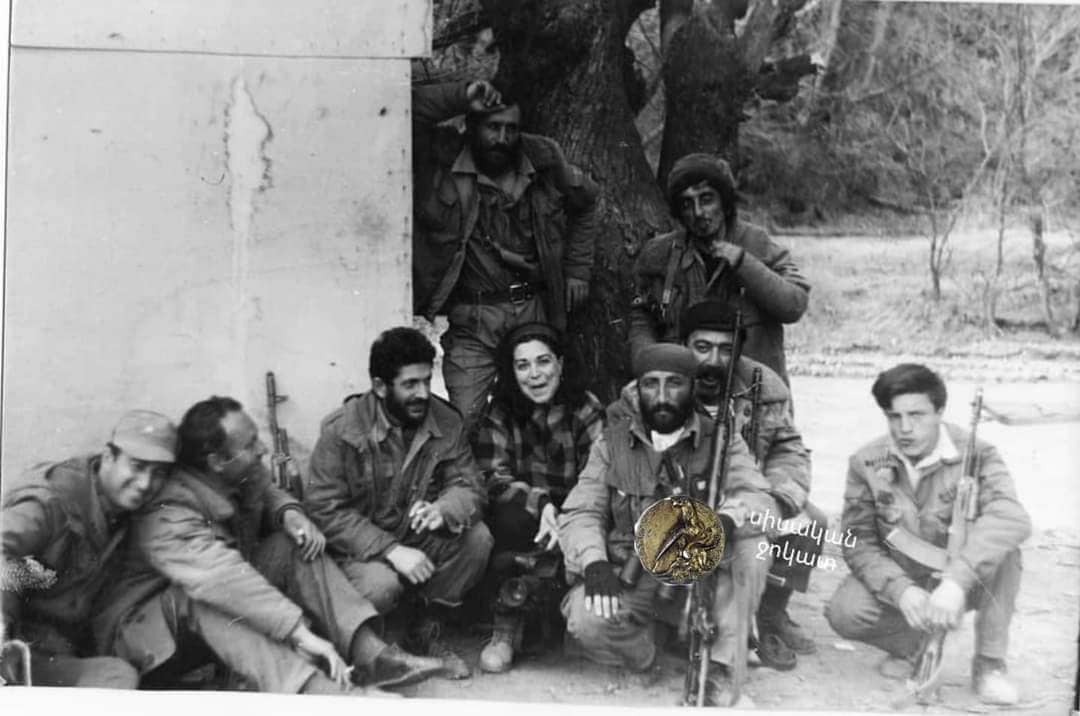
Sisakan volunteer detachment and journalist Tsvetana Paskaleva in Kalbajar, 1993

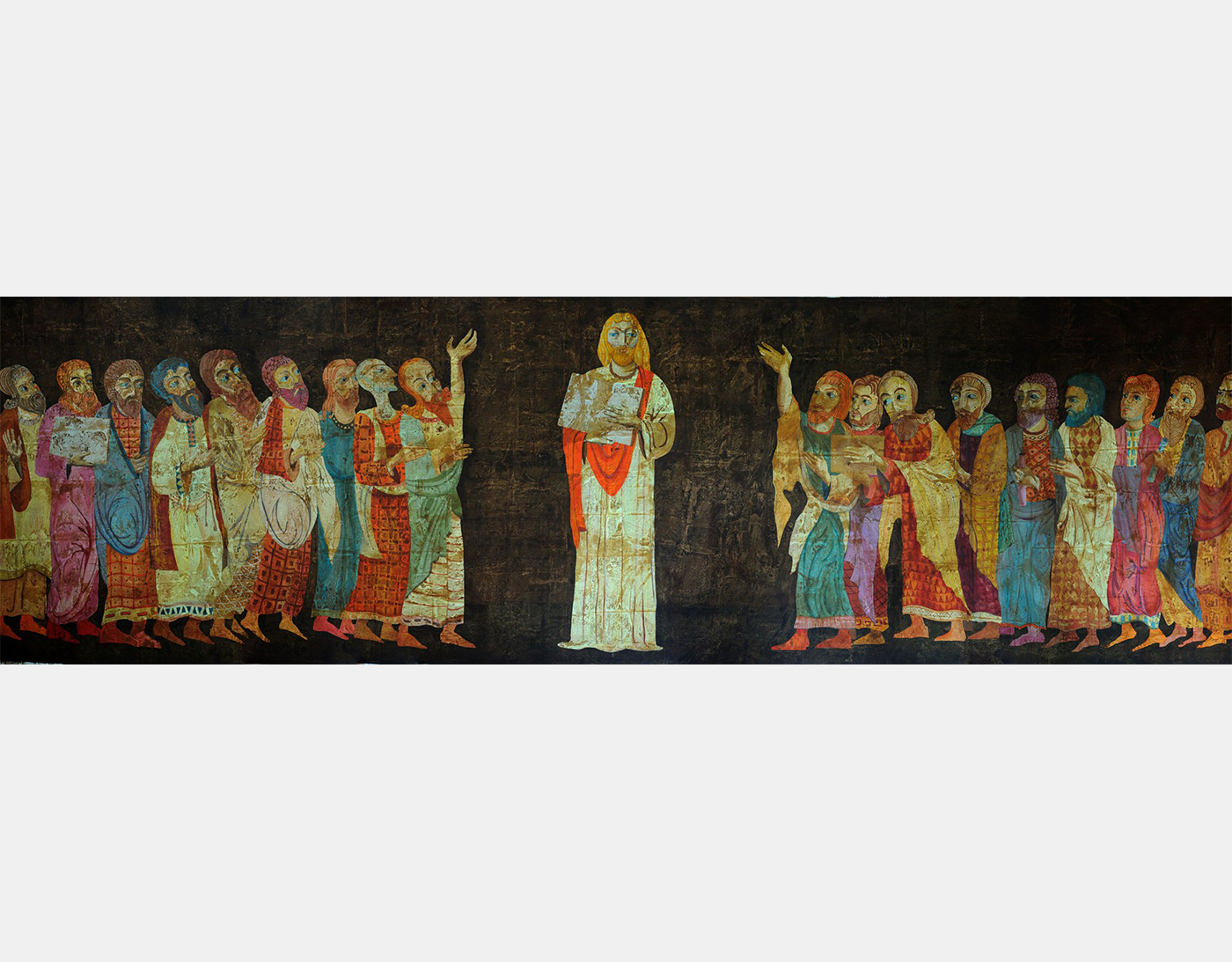
Ashot Avagyan, fresco ''Mashtots'' in Matenadaran

== Early life and career ==
Ashot Avagyan was born in 1958 in Sisian, Soviet Armenia to Ararat Avagyan, father, a history teacher. His mother Parandzem Voskanyan was an accountant. Ashot's interest in fine arts started at the Children's Art School of Sisian, where he attended the studios of E. Hakobjanyan, V. Stepanyan, and Z. Khachatryan.

In 1975 Avagyan entered the Yerevan Art College after P. Terlemezyan, studying in the studio of Samvel Petrosyan. From 1977 to 1979 he joined the Soviet Army and was in military service in Siberia. After graduating in 1981 he returned to his hometown and started teaching at Children's Art School until 2016.

In the frame of the Artsakh movement of 1988, Ashot Avagyan was one of the organizers of protests in Sisian together with his maternal uncle Vurg Voskanyan who later was martyred in 1993 during the First Nagorno-Karabakh War. After the first protests, the Karabakh Committee of Sisian was established with members including Ashot Minasyan, Masis Baghdasaryan, Artush Yesayan, and others. Avagyan's artistic development was paused as he concentrated his efforts on the war and later on in the development of the army as a coordinator of civil issues of Sisian's military unit. He fully returned to art in 1998 after his military service.

== Fine arts and performances ==
The local cultural environment and the surroundings are fundamental for Ashot Avagyan's artistic practice. The artist's fascination with historic sites especially petroglyphs started during childhood, when examining his father's professional literature on local history. However, he discovered for himself the petroglyphs of Ukhtasar during the First Nagorno-Karabakh War and later on returned there a couple of times establishing an off-road path to reach them. This afterward was developed into a gravel route, turning Ukhtasar petroglyphs into one of the most visited tourist attractions of Sisian.

Besides petroglyphs, their motives and the structure of the stones, artist turns to figurative carvings of medieval Armenian gravestones as a source of inspiration.

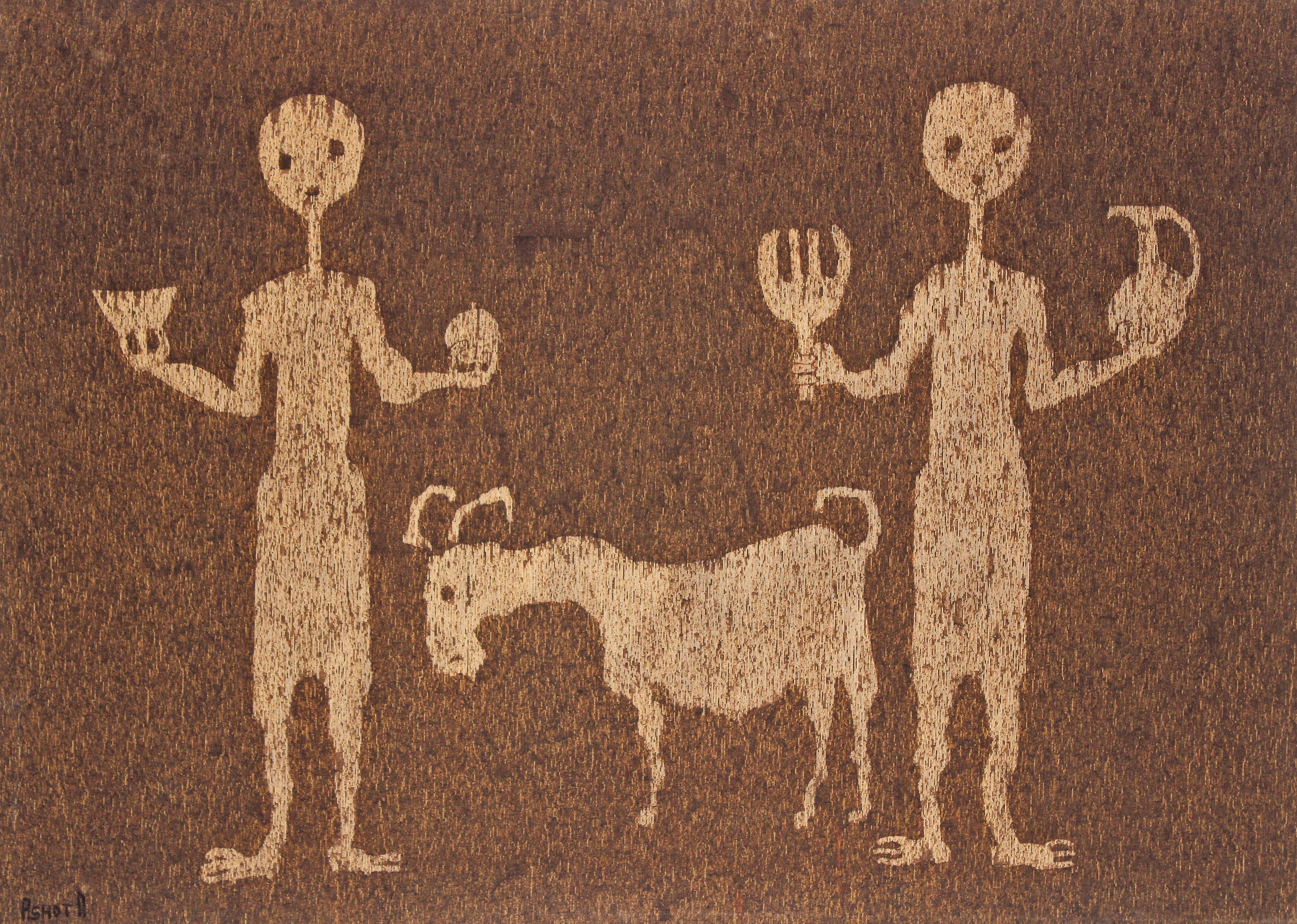
Ashot Avagyan, ''Meeting 1''

Ashot Avagyan's art reveals own characteristics when analyzed and compared. Being contemporary, it misses out many of conceptual tendencies of contemporary art. It doesn't strive for the complex inter-textual and inter-meshed analysis and deconstruction in general. It neither hides messages to audience to interpret. In this sense his art is quite straight forward. The depicted presents everyday life scenes ('Hunt', 'Walk', 'Meeting', 'Idyll'), emotions ('Lamentation', 'Musicians'), which get evident through the action depicted in the picture. Also universal subjects, such as death and birth. In this way he gets close to revealing the most fundamental, universal matters, the life cycle and questions on life. From formal perspective Avagyan's art is astonishing. The surface of the works is developed very finely. The technical characteristics are archived by carefully thought out and considered layering of materials and combination and interaction of presented motives. The whole delicacy of the works is unfolded when the canvas is examined in close up and in details.

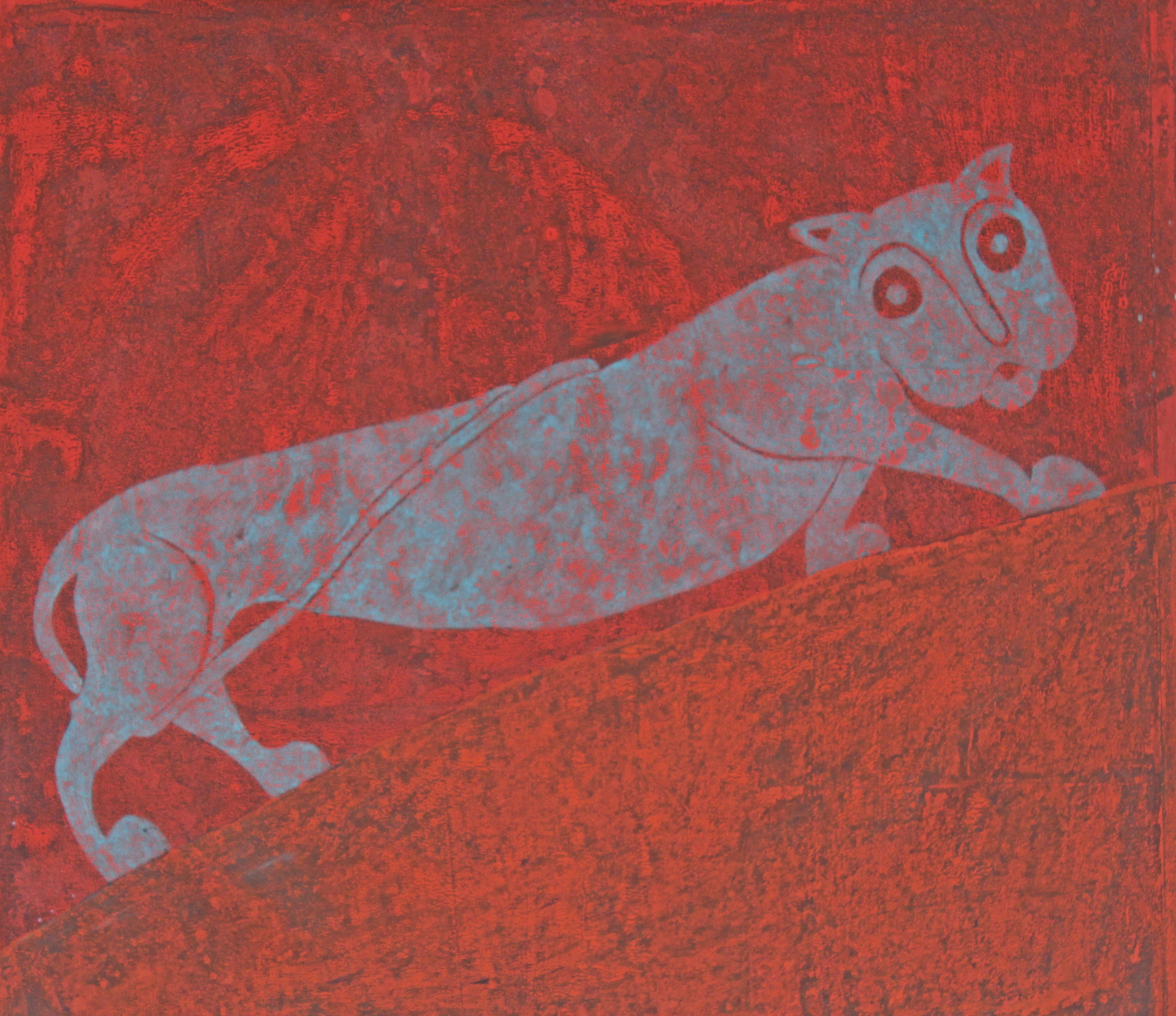
Ashot Avagyan, ''Walk 2''

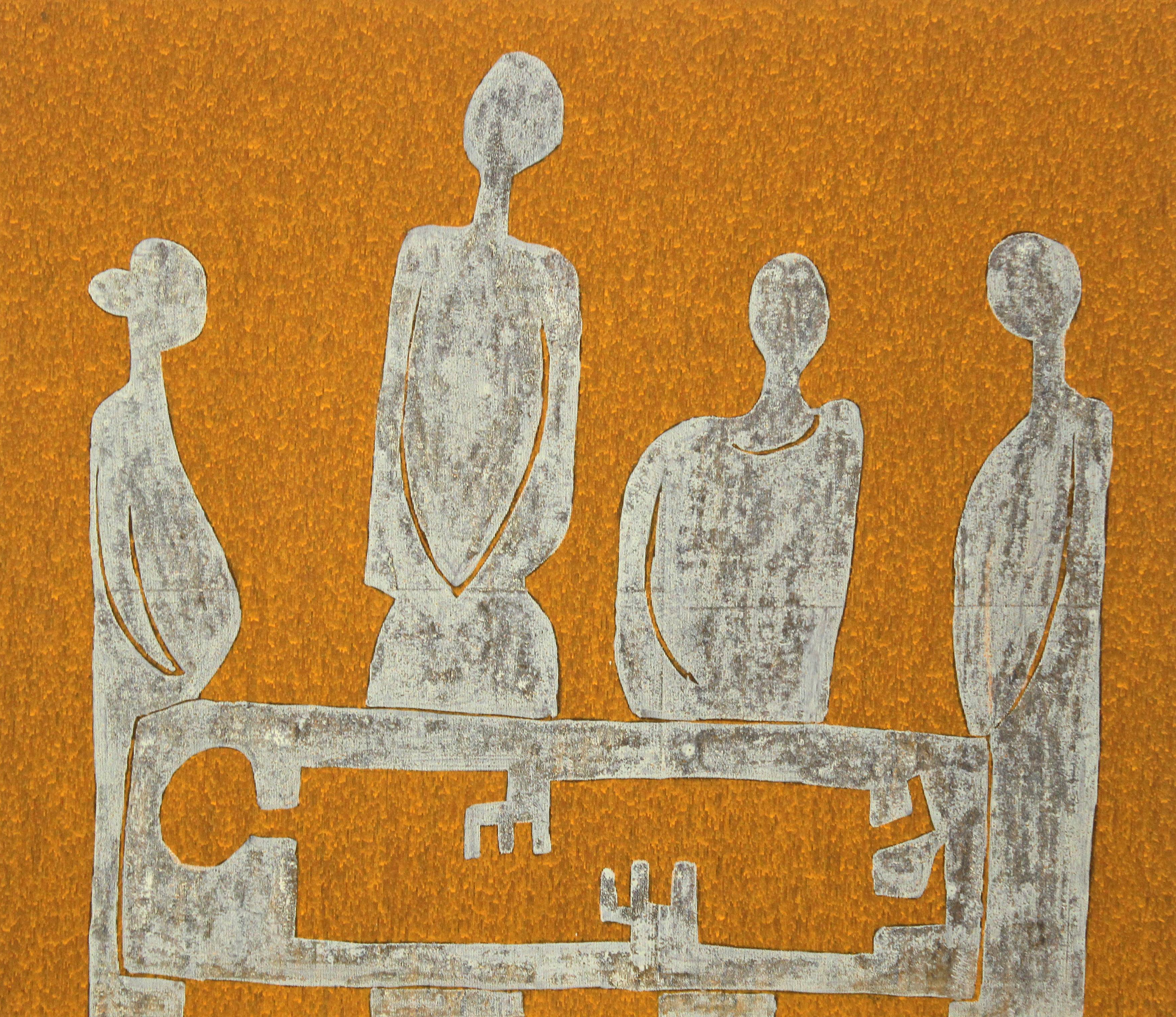
Ashot Avagyan, ''April 2016 Lamentation''

Another dimension of Ashot Avagyna's work is performance. The performances are hybrid of rituals, myths, Armenian and other traditions, local tales. On the other hand, those do not obtain ethnographic character, rather are built on artist's own interpretations, reflections and their prospecting on modern art. Existential narrative like death ("Return" and "Return-2"), where the artist together with Azat Sargsyan, presents elements not only the burial tradition common in Armenia, but also integrates details from ancient times and typical to some other cultures. For example, coffin that resembles a boat that is burned. A practice known in ancient Scandinavia and other cultures. The transport of coffin with horses exchanged with motorcycles is an example of playful interpretation. In another performance "Fertility" artist revises the ancient fertility ritual practiced in Sisian, Portakar, without taking the core narrative of the tradition and cult. While in "Sacrifice" only a part of Armenian fairy tales (the dragon blocking the source of water, is offered a virgin in order to let the water out for the villagers), is brought up in action in order to show the ritual of sacrifice. In other performances, the sacrifice objects become artist's own canvases. For all the performances ritual is an important component, however the main characteristics are that all of them take place in nature and cultural monuments. No gallery or museum space is involved. This creates not only the instantaneous action but also intends to bring the art to nature and nature to art, the action of performance is united with the surrounding monument, combining them as inseparable units. This notion is exposed especially in the first performances, where in "Dialogue" the artist tried to create a relationship between his art, nature and Zorats Karer monument hanging his paintings and letting the wind and the sound of the movement from canvases create a 'conversation'. In the act of "The Way" the creation of the life is rendered by his canvases coming out of water, life being canvases and the water that originated the life being the lake of mount Ukhtasar.

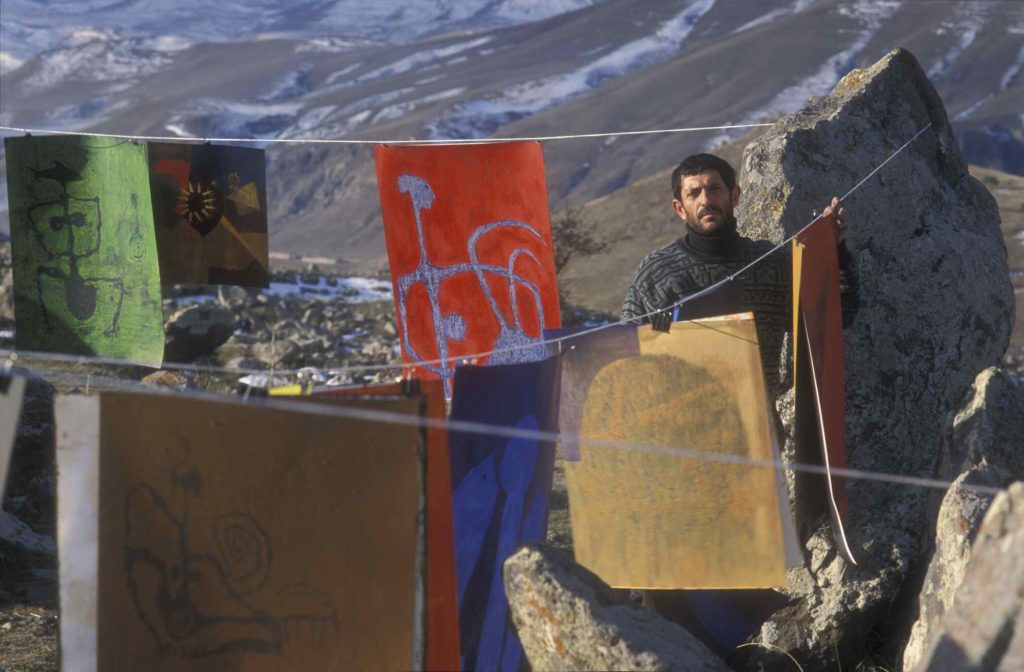
Ashot Avagyan, performance ''Dialogue'', Sisian, Zorats Karer

Both in performances and in his fine arts artist not only attempts to create a bridge between culture of the past and the present but becomes the bridge, the intermediary for connecting the two times, and the filler for the gap between them, the catalyst. And his art not only obtains the independence from the cultural heritage, not only carries it but also turns into a way of preservation of that same cultural heritage.

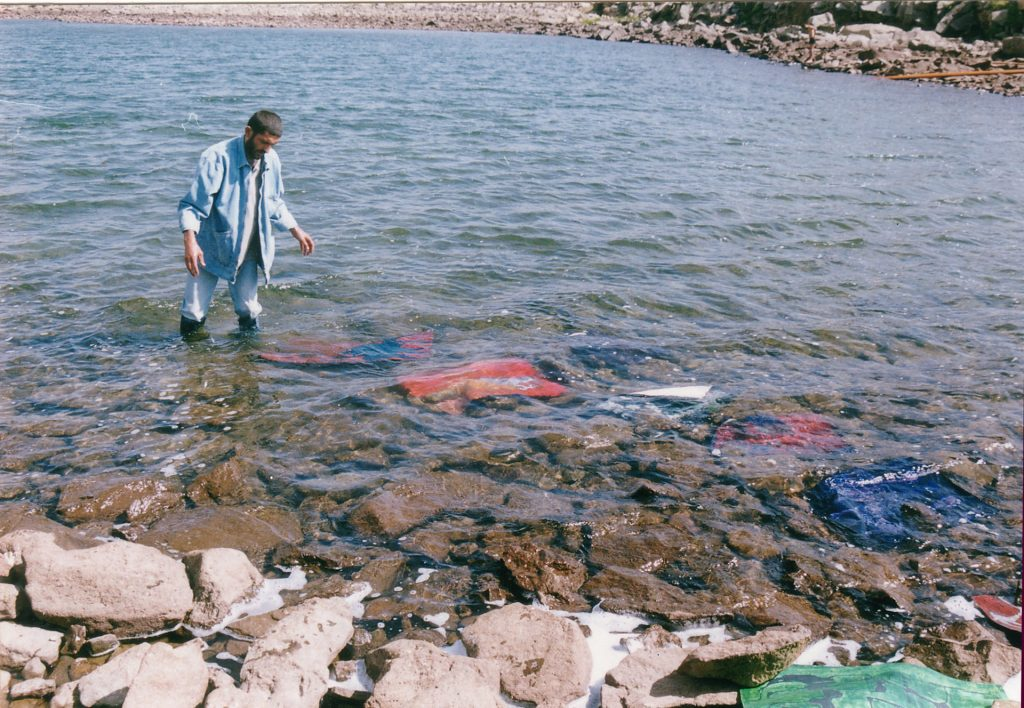
Ashot Avagyan, performance ''The Way'', Sisian, Ukhtasar

== Epicenter Art Laboratory ==
In 2014 Ashot Avagyan established 'Epicenter Art Laboratory', where he conducts his performances. It is an open-air site outside of Sisian resembling a megalithic cromlech. The artist considers it as a sacred place, and the site is under constant development.

== List of solo shows ==
2017- April 2016, 'Whore’s Stocking' military position, Sargis Muradyan Gallery, Yerevan, Armenia

2015 - Mashtots, Hamazkayin Lucy Tutunjian Art Gallery, Bourj Hammoud, Lebanon

2015 - Untitled, German Embassy in Armenia, Yerevan, Armenian

2013 - The inheritor of the heritage, Zvartnotc historical-cultural reserve-museum, Armenia

2013 - 48 th 'Salon de peinture de la ville de Montelimar', Hotel de Ville, Montelimar, France

2012 - Untitled, Consulate of the Republic of Armenia, Los Angeles, USA

2012 - Mashtots 1650, Abrahamyan Art Center, Yerevan, Armenia

2011 - Untitled, Matenadaran (Institute of Ancient Manuscripts), Yerevan, Armenia

2010 - Untitled, Embassy of the United States, Yerevan, Armenia

2009 - Untitled, Zhorats Karer, Sisian, Armenia

2008 - Memories from previous life, Gevorgyan Gallery, Yerevan, Armenia

2004 - Magic double circle, Gevorgyan Gallery, Yerevan, Armenia

2000 - The seven papers of Demiurge, Chamber Theater, Yerevan, Armenia

== List of performances ==
Involve the areas of cultural sites and monuments of and around Sisian (Ukhtasar petroglyphs, Zorats Karer, Portakar).

2021 – There will be revanche, Epicenter Art Laboratory, Sisian, Armenia

2018 - Regret, Epicenter Art Laboratory, Sisian, Armenia

2017 - Reconstruction, Epicenter Art Laboratory, Sisian, Armenia

Fertility – 2, Epicenter Art Laboratory, Sisian, Armenia

Solstice, Epicenter Art Laboratory, Sisian, Armenia

2016 - Solstice, Epicenter Art Laboratory, Sisian, Armenia

2015 - Solstice, Epicenter Art Laboratory, Sisian, Armenia

2014 - Solstice, Epicenter Art Laboratory, Sisian, Armenia

2012 - Sacrifice – 2, in the frames of Shushi Art Project ''Land and Technology'', Shushi, Nagorno-Karabakh

2011 - Return – 4, Sisian, Armenia

2010 - Return – 3, Sisian, Armenia

2008 - Sacrifice, Sisian, Armenia

2007 - Return – 2, Sisian, Armenia

2006 - Return, in the frame of the 5 th Gyumri International Biennale, with Azat Sargsyan, Sisian, Armenia

2004 - Fertility, Sisian, Armenia

2003 - Reincarnation, Sisian, Armenia

2002 - Magic double circle, Sisian, Armenia, with Levon Tarumyan and Yerevan State Pantomime Theater

2001 - Forgive me, Mama!, Sisian, Armenia

2000 - The way, Sisian, Armenia

1999 - Dialogue, Sisian, Armenia

== List of selected group exhibitions ==
2019 – Born in Syunik, in the frame of Aurora forum, Tatev Monastery Complex, Tatev, Armenia

2019 - Colors of freedom, Modern Art Museum of Yerevan, Yerevan, Armenia

2018 - Armenian Artist Fair, Quadriennale of Lyon, Palais de Bondy, Lyon, France

2012 - Armenian Artists in Firenze, Circolo Ufficiale di Presidio, Florence, Italy

Armenian Artists in Scafati, Centro per la Cultura e le Arti, Scafati, Italy

Untitled, Art World, Yerevan, Armenia

2011 - Armeni, Embassy of the Republic of Armenia, Rome, Italy

S. Petrosyan and students, Museum of Modern Art, Yerevan, Armenia

20 years of Interdependency of the Republic of Armenia, National Gallery of Armenia, Yerevan,

Armenia

2010 - Armeni, Castel dell'Ovo, Naples, Italy

Tigran the Great, National Gallery of Armenia, Yerevan, Armenia

2008 - Generation freedom: Armenia’s new vanguard, InterArt Gallery, New York, USA

The 6 th Gyumri International Biennale, Gyumri, Armenia

2007 - Armenian landscapes in contemporary art, ewz-Unterwerk Selnau Kultur- und Eventhaus,

Zurich, Switzerland

Contemporary artists form Armenia, Armenian General Benevolent Union, Pasadena, USA

From Ararat to Fuji, National Gallery of Armenia, Yerevan, Armenia

Colors of Armenia, Armenian General Benevolent Union, Damascus, Syria

Colors of Armenia, G. Gyulbenkyan Center, Aleppo, Syria

2006 - Meeting with Saryan, National Gallery of Armenia, Yerevan, Armenia

Colors of Armenia, IFEFEL, Saint-Petersburg, Russia

Colors of Armenia, Abdala Al-Salem Hall, Kuwait, Kuwait

The 5 th Gyumri International Biennale, Gyumri, Armenia

2005 - Art Caucasus Art Expo, Tbilisi, Georgia

2004 - Art Caucasus Art Expo, Tbilisi, Georgia

The 4 th Gyumri International Biennale, Gyumri, Armenia

2003 - Transcendent, Albert & Tove Boyajyan Gallery, Yerevan, Armenia

Armenian Genocide, Cooper Union, New York, USA

Four Armenian artists, Contemporary & modern art, Dublin, Ireland

Four Armenian artists, Montreal, Canada

2002 - Show of avant-garde art, ACCEA, Yerevan, Armenia

Four Armenian artists, Arshile Gorky gallery, Toronto, Canada

Four Armenian artists, Royal Library, Copenhagen, Denmark

== List of selected catalogues ==
2017 - Armenian Artists: Yerevan [Eng.]

2015 - Mashtots: Hamazkayin Lucy Tutunjian Art Gallery. Beirut [Arm., Eng.]

2013 - Armeni: Turin [Eng.]

2008 - Generation Freedom: Armenia's New Vanguard. New York: RAH [Eng.]

Recovering Wounds. Yerevan: GCCA [Arm., Eng.]

2007 - Armenian Landscapes in Contemporary Art. Yerevan [Germ., Eng.]

4 Contemporary Artists from Armenia. Pasadena: AGBU [Eng.]

2006 - The colors of Armenia, contemporary Armenian artists. Yerevan: Tigran Mets [Rus.]

The 5 th Gyumri International Biennale. Yerevan: GCCA [Arm., Eng.]

2005 - Art Caucasus. Art Expo-2005. Tbilisi: Art Caucasus [Arm., Eng.]

2004 - The 4 th Gyumri International Biennale. Yerevan: GCCA, 2004[Arm., Eng.]

Gevorgyan Gallery. Yerevan: Gevorgyan Gallery [Arm., Eng.]

Art Caucasus. Art Expo-2004. Tbilisi: Art Caucasus [Arm., Eng.]

== Work with Zorats Karer archaeological site ==
From 2010 to 2018 Ashot Avagyan was the director of Zorats Karer megalithic historical complex in Sisian. His engagement in different projects targeted the development of tourism on the site, as well as surroundings. He also assisted different local and international archaeological expeditions, among them the Oxford University Expedition (leader Mihran Vardanyan), aimed ratifying scientific evidence related to the site, disclosing the myths and conspiracy created and spread by non-scientific circles (P. Herouni and his followers). The latter circles occasionally targeted artist, his art and persona with fake news and offenses, however, these harassment and insults, especially in social media, were extremely intensified in 2018. On top of that, disagreements with newly established government led the artist to terminate his position.

== Political engagement and repressions ==
In February 1988 Ashot Avagyan together with his maternal uncle Vurg Voskanyan organized and coordinated the demonstrations for Karabakh Movement in Sisian. This of course, was discouraged by the communist authorities of the town, neither KGB was delighted. However, as the demonstrations picked up a massive wave, and many more joined the movement, the organizers avoided imprisonment.

After independence, Avagyan was elected as a member of local committee of Sisian, and since then actively participated in shaping local politics of the town.

During the ban of Armenian Revolutionary Federation activities in Armenia from 1994 to 1998, Ashot Avagyan's political engagement with ARF went underground. Massive repressions from the governing regime took over the ARF work, while he continued his military service.

In 2008 Avagyan was elected as a member of Council of Elders in Sisian having an active role in it.

In November 2020, days after prime minister Nikol Pashinyan signed ceasefire agreement on third Nagorno-Karabakh war, Ashot Avagyan, together with Ashot Minasyan, Artur Vanetsyan and Vahram Baghdasaryan, was accused for assassination attempt on prime minister. Security service arrested Ashot and others basing on an audio record that National Security Service broadcast on national television. Prior to that, Ashot's house was illegally searched (with no evidence found), and he was brought to National Security Service headquarters in Yerevan as a witness. There he then was accused and arrested. During the first trial the judge released the artist and others as it was proven that the audio record was fake. Security service, using phone tapping, recorded mobile conversations of defendants and editing them fabricated the record. Since prosecuting side could not provide a single evidence that the defendants planned an assassination, the case didn't progress. A year later, in December 2021, all the defendants were justified, and the case was closed. Avagyan is known for publicly criticizing Nikol Pashinyan, his party and later on his government, and this case, obviously demonstrates Pashinyan's attempt to repress the artist for his political views.

== Personal life ==
Ashot Avagyan has a younger sister and a younger brother (who also participated in Nagorno-Karabakh wars) and two children.
