= Funzie Girt =

Ancient wall in Shetland, Scotland

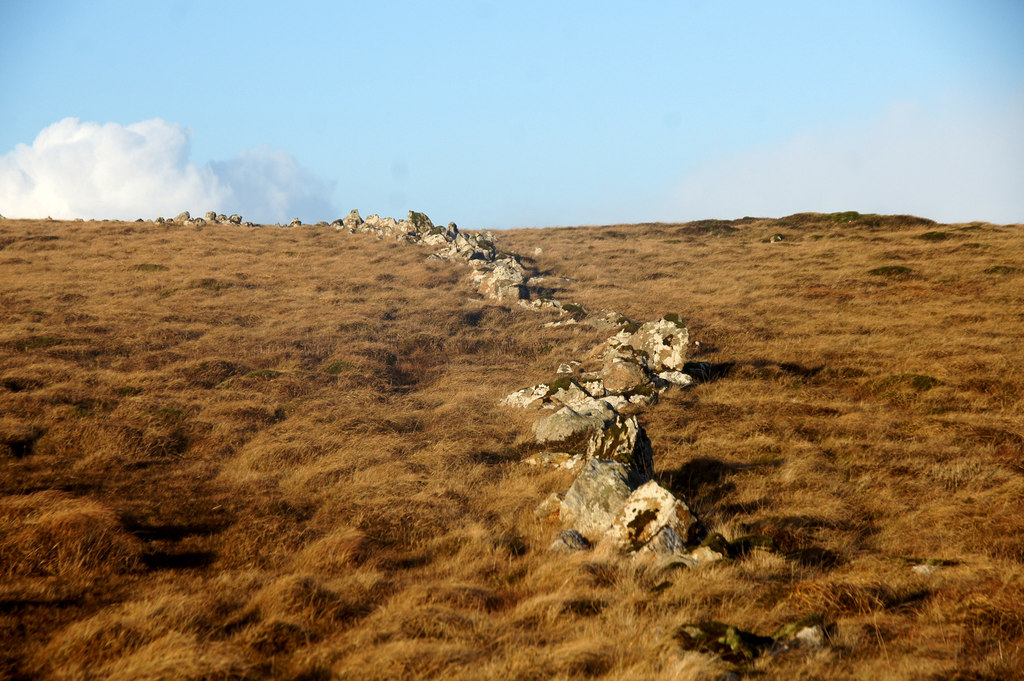
- The wall in 2015

- Location in Scotland, United Kingdom
- 60.623°N 0.868°W
- Type: Wall
- Location: Scotland, United Kingdom

History
- Built: c. 1500 BC

Site notes
- Material: Stone

Funzie Girt (/ˈfɪni ɡɜːrt/; Scots: Funyie Girt "Finns' dyke") is an ancient wall that was erected from north to south across the island of Fetlar in Shetland, Scotland. Some sources describe it as having been built in the Neolithic, but the date of construction is not certainly known. The line of the wall, which ran for over 4 kilometres (2.5 mi), once divided the island in two almost equal sections. Also known as the Finnigirt Dyke, it has vanished in places at the southern end, although the ruins are clearly visible along much of the uninhabited north of the island, where it is a conspicuous feature of the landscape. The dyke's original purpose is not known, nor is its relationship to other archaeological sites of a similar age nearby. There are various folk tales about its construction, and it is the subject of various pieces of Shetland folk music.

== Etymology ==
The name "Funzie Girt" means "Finns' dyke", the Finns being the legendary pre-Norse inhabitants of the islands who were said to possess magical powers. (The later Iron Age inhabitants of the Northern Isles were actually Pictish, although the historical record is fairly sparse.) The variation between Finn and Funzie is due to widespread confusion of the letter ȝ (yogh) with the cursive form of the letter z. An earlier name for the dyke was simply "Finnigord" and Finnigirt dyke is thus tautologous as gord already means "dyke".

The dyke could have had a role in the naming of Fetlar itself. The division of the island by the dyke was so marked that the Norse seemed to treat Fetlar as two distinct islands—which they called "Est Isle" and "Wast Isle". Haswell-Smith (2004) suggests that the derivation of the name is from fetill, the Old Norse for a "strap" or a "tie", and that Fetlar could therefore mean "two islands tied together" by the dyke. Gammeltoft (2010) however, argues that fetlar actually means "shoulder-straps", that this description is hardly an obvious one for an island name and Fetlar is thus most probably a Norse adaptation of a precursor language. This was probably the Pictish language although there is no unequivocal evidence for this.

== Geography ==
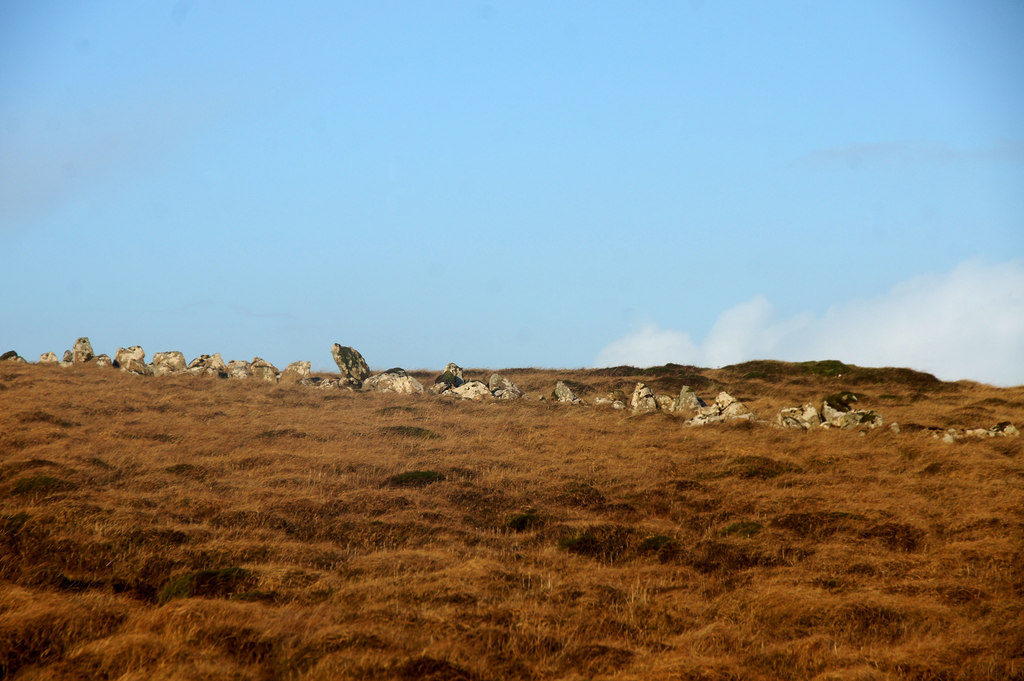
Funzie Girt, south-west of Vord Hill and north of Whilsa Pund and Fiddler's Crus

Originally 1 metre (3 ft) wide it begins at the north shore by the cliffs of Muckle Funziegord Geo ("big Finns' dyke gully"), crosses an RSPB reserve to the west of Vord Hill, then vanishes near the enclosure of Whilsa Pund. It can be seen again passing the Haltadans stone circle as it heads for the northern shore of Skutes Water. It reappears at the southern shore of Skutes Water, which may suggest that Skutes Water itself was employed as a kind of barrier. It is particularly well-preserved between Riggin of Setter and Rivs Dale. It can be seen again in the form of several large stones to the west of Hubie where it passes through a field there on the southern side of the road. It may have crossed an area known as Vallahamars by the ruins of a later broch reaching the south coast of Fetlar near Stack of Billaclett, although local tradition asserts that it ended at the edge of the cliffs of Clemmels Geos (HU620905). The total length would therefore originally have been 4 kilometres (2.5 mi) or more.

Whilsa Pund is constructed using a similar technique and was probably built at a similar time to Funzie Girt. Its stone-built perimeter is oblong in shape and measures roughly 293 metres (320 yd) from north to south and 128 metres (140 yd) transversely. The remains of various structures lie within it and on the west side there is a shallow bay that forms an enclosure approximately 15 square metres (161 sq ft) in area.

There are various other prehistoric ruins near the line of the wall, including the Bronze Age Hjaltadans stone circle north of Skutes Water, which is only 6 metres (20 ft) from the dyke, and the three stone circles of Fiddler's Crus to the north-west. There are also two Neolithic heel-shaped cairns, a style of chambered cairn unique to Shetland, near the summit of Vord Hill.

The hamlet of Funzie and the nearby Bay of Funzie and Loch of Funzie are some 3 kilometres (1.9 mi) east of Houbie and appear to have no direct connection with the dyke itself.

== Construction ==
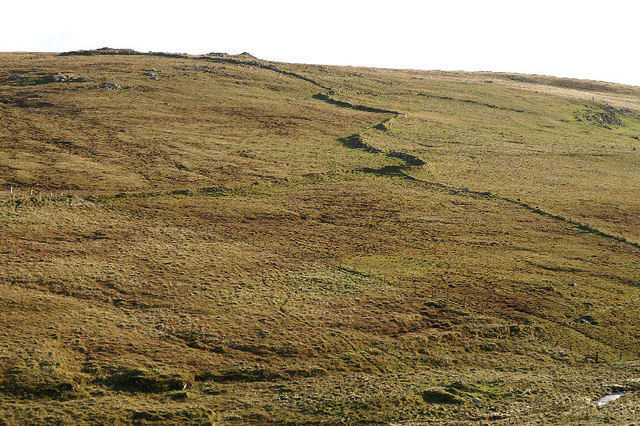
A fealie dyke at Burn of Feal on Fetlar

The date of construction is unknown. Haswell-Smith (2004) speculatively implies a Mesolithic provenance and a Bronze Age date has also been mentioned although the Neolithic is quoted by some authoritative sources. However the distinction between the Neolithic and Bronze Ages is not especially marked in Shetland and a date prior to the 1st millennium BC is likely.

There are numerous old boundary dykes in Shetland and Funzie Girt is considered to be the best surviving example. It both divides the island west to east and also marks an upland/lower land boundary, with the higher slopes of Vord Hill to the east of the dyke. It is constructed from local stones with the largest slabs and boulders placed either on end or on edge and forming the base. The human effort required would have been considerable and suggests a relatively high Neolithic population for Shetland—perhaps as much as 10,000. Although most likely built as a territorial boundary of some kind, the original purpose of the dyke is not certain. In historic times it acted as a boundary marker or hagri, but its huge scale is difficult to reconcile with the available prehistoric human resources. It has been described as a "Bronze Age Berlin Wall", which may have separated two competing tribes.

By contrast, "fealie dykes" were made of turf such as the nearby example at Burn of Feal less than 0.5 kilometres (550 yd) east of the line of the Funzie Girt south of Skutes Water. Even when they had stone bases these dykes needed regular maintenance and in historic times were often mounted with fences to make them stock-proof.

== History and scheduling ==
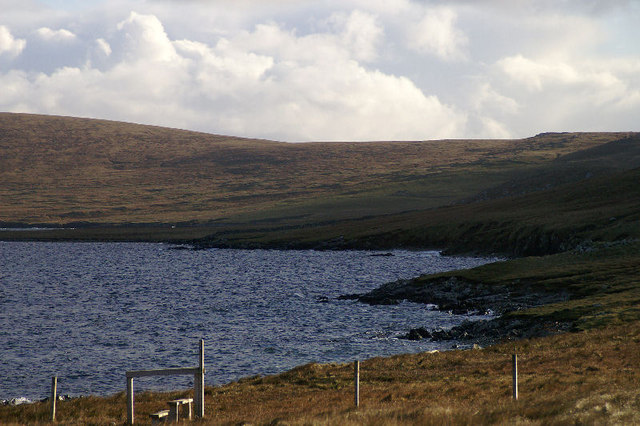
Vord Hill from the west - Funzie Girt runs along the side of the hill at about 90 metres (295 ft) above sea level

A strip of land 1 kilometre (0.62 mi) wide that ran along the dyke's eastern side was once known as "Houbie", now the name of Fetlar's principal settlement. Fetlar was surveyed in 1850, at which time part of the Funzie Girt formed the east end of one of the important "marches" or property boundaries for Russeter, west of Colbinstoft on north Fetlar. At that time the oldest man on the island, one Andrew Johnson, claimed to have been on the last "riding" of the bounds in 1820.

The northern, and most complete section of Funzie Girt has been protected as a scheduled monument since December 1957. The notification to Sir Harold Stanley Nicolson of Brough Lodge, Fetlar states that the protected area is "2000 yards or thereby" (i.e. about 1,828 metres) in extent. The text provides a detailed description and the associated map indicates the line of the wall. No land on either side is included. The scheduled area is however contiguous with that of the "irregular polygon" surrounding Whilsa Pund that received similar protection in 1998.

== Folklore and music ==
A large rock known as "the Haljer o' Fivlagord" lies near the south end of the dyke. Fivl means "troll" (or "trow" in Shetland dialect), suggesting that there was a belief at one time that the dyke had been constructed by these mythical creatures. Trolls were also supposed to inhabit a nearby cave on the coast. A local story concerns the farm at Colbinstoft to the west of the dyke on the north coast of Fetlar. The farmer desired a boundary fence for his property and promised that if one appeared during the night he would give up his best cow to the Finns. The next morning the dyke had appeared but the cow was gone. There is also a tradition that it was constructed as a result of a disagreement between two landowners.

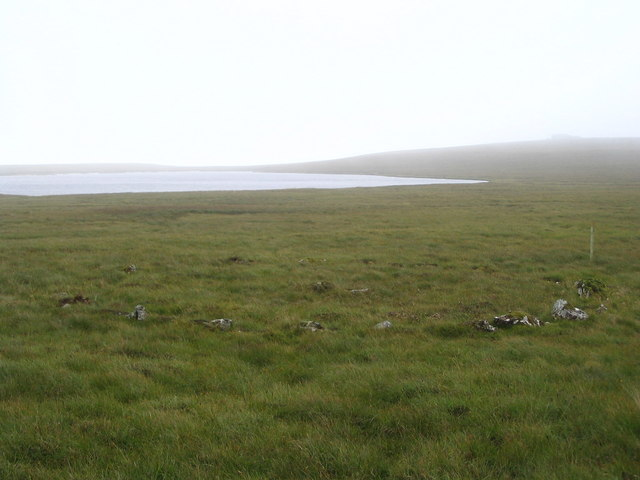
Haltadans stone circle

Haltadans means "limping dance" and local folklore has it that a fiddler and his wife were dancing at night with trolls. They failed to notice the dawn and were all petrified in place when the sun rose, so turning the trolls into the circle of stones, with the two recumbent stones at the centre being the resting place of the humans.

Debbie Scott, a fiddle player from Papa Stour recorded the song "Da Hill o' Finnigirt – Da Burn o' Finnigirt" on her 1985 album The Selkie's Song which features guitarist Peerie Johnson. There is also a fiddle tune called the "Muckle Reel O' Finnigirt", which accompanied a dance whose steps have now been lost, although it is known that it was played as a break from the more strenuous reels.

== See also ==
- Biruaslum
- Hartashen Megalithic Avenue, parallel rows of Neolithic menhirs in Armenia
