= Hartashen Megalithic Avenue =

Megalith site in Armenia

- Location within Armenia
- 41°0′47″N 43°56′1″E
- Type: Megalith
- Periods: Neolithic / Bronze Age
- Location: Hartashen, Shirak Province, Armenia

Hartashen Megalithic Avenue is a megalithic monument in Armenia. There are two avenues of megalithic rocks which do not intersect. These avenues are composed of basalt stones which are placed at an angle, and menhirs are arranged in three rows in each. The purpose of these three rows of menhirs in unclear and further research is underway. There is no firm dating of the monument. It has been attributed in recent years to anti-tank defences constructed in the Second World War, but recent research favours an interpretation that the site, if not its arrangement, dates to the Neolithic or Bronze Age and perhaps shares a context with the Carnac stones of France.

== Context ==
The monument comprises 760 preserved menhirs. Some menhirs have been disturbed, and it is estimated there may have been up to 1,200 originally. The flat surface between the monuments comprises an unexcavated funerary monument. No connection has been discovered between the avenue and the funerary monuments. The rows of stele begin at a rocky outcrop and follow the valley topography for 500 metres (1,600 ft). The monument is not astronomically aligned, nor aligned with any features within the topography.

The arrangement of the stone rows were integrated into a modern anti-tank military barrier. As there is no firm dating, it is unknown to what extent and in what form the avenues predate this modern use.

== See also ==
- Carahunge
- Desert kite
- Funzie Girt, an ancient dividing wall that runs for over 4 km (2.5 mi) across the island of Fetlar in Scotland.

== Bibliography ==
- Allen, T (8 September 2023). Armenia and Nagorno Karabagh (2023 ed.). Buckinghamshire: Bradt Guides. p. 264. ISBN 9781784779436.
- "Expedition to Hartashen". Carahunge. 25 June 2021.
- Cassen, S (2016). "Sites de passage (2). Le modèle carnacois des pierres dressées à l'épreuve des steppes et des légendes." (PDF). Fonctions, utilisations et représentations de l'espace dans les sépultures monumentales du Néolithique européen/Functions, uses and representations of space in the monumental graves of Neolithic Europe. Préhistoires Méditerranéennes (in French). pp. 343–362.
- Neal, Meagan (20 August 2024). "Walk along a slice of prehistory at Hartashen's Megalithic Avenues".
- Schunke, T; Yeganyan, L; Khachatryan, H (2011). "Ein steiniges Tal – rätselhafte Steinstrukturen im Ashotsk-Tal bei Hartashen, Provinz Schirak,". In Meller, H; Avetisya, P (eds.). Archäologie Armenien: Ergebnisse der Kooperationsprojekte 2010: ein Vorbericht. Halle: Landesamt für Denkmalpflege und Archäologie Sachsen-Anhalt - Landesmuseum für Vorgeschichte. pp. 73–105.
