= Artashen =

Artashen may refer to:

- Aratashen, Armenia
- Hartashen, Shirak, Armenia
- Hartashen, Syunik, Armenia
- Ardeşen, Turkey
