= Paris Herouni =

Soviet and Armenian physicist and engineer

- Born: December 17, 1933; Yerevan, Soviet Armenia
- Died: December 5, 2008 (aged 74); Yerevan, Armenia
- Education: Moscow Power Engineering Institute
- Known for: creation of the “Herouni Mirror Radio telescope"
- Awards: USSR State Prize (1986)
- Scientific career
- Fields: Radiotechnical systems
- Workplaces: National Polytechnic University of Armenia

Paris Misaki Herouni (Armenian: Պարիս Միսակի Հերունի, December 17, 1933 – December 5, 2008) was a Soviet and Armenian physicist and engineer. He was a member of the Armenian National Academy of Sciences in the fields of radio-physics, radio-engineering, and radio-astronomy and the head of the Antenna Systems chair, which he founded, at the National Polytechnic University of Armenia and Radio Physics Research Institute (RRI). In 1986, he was awarded the USSR State Prize.

== Biography ==
Herouni was born in Yerevan, Armenia, on December 17, 1933. His father was a survivor of the Armenian genocide from Hadjin. Upon completion of his undergraduate studies in Yerevan, Herouni attended the Moscow Power Engineering Institute, where he earned his graduate degree in radio technology in 1957. He earned his doctorate of philosophy in radio techniques from the same institution in 1965. Herouni became an associate professor in 1968 and a full professor in 1983.

Because of his many scientific discoveries, Herouni received numerous awards such as: the Order of the Red Banner of Labour, the Silver Medal of Catholicos of All Armenians (given to him by Vazgen I), the State Prize of Soviet Armenia in the field of Science (1985), the Medal "Veteran of Labour", a Bronze Medal from the Ministry of Foreign Affairs of France, and the Lomonosov Gold Medal from the Russian Academy of Sciences. In addition, Herouni held over 20 patents and published over 340 scientific works, including two monographs during his lifetime.

== Scientific works ==
=== Radio Astronomy ===
Herouni's scientific discoveries and theories include his theory and calculations on the Method of the Large Double Mirror Antennas with Fixed Spherical Main Mirror, his theory and equations of electromagnetic field diffraction on the apertures of different configurations. He also developed radio holography—methods of field determination in space by measurements of complex fields near (NF) emitting or scattering objects. In addition, he created methods of Near-to-Far (NF - FF) measurements of antennas and scattering objects parameters. He created the Theory of Field Diffraction in antenna edges when illuminating the part of the main aperture and Antenna Metrology direction.

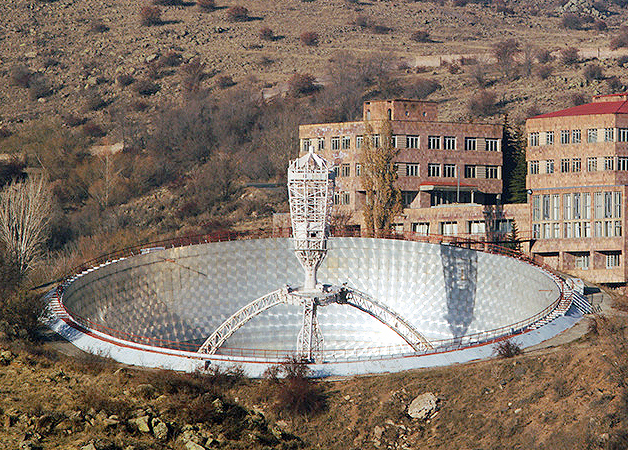
The Orgov Radio-Optical Telescope in Orgov, Armenia

Herouni proposed and developed the Orgov Radio-Optical Telescope, also known as the "Herouni Mirror Radio telescope". It has a large antenna with a diameter 54 m (177 ft) and one of the best parameters among all large antennas in the world. He concluded and built an Antenna Parameters and Phase Shift Angle, being the first 11, based on the World National Primary Standards.

He was the first to come across the powerful radio-flare on the Eta Geminorum star, a red giant and the powerful flares associated with that type of star. He also was the first to measure an aperture of an antenna, in the World Radio Hologram. Using this, he designed and built many highly, effective automatic complexes of equipment for NF - FF antenna measurement.

==== Rejections of Cosmic Background Radiation and Big Bang ====
Herouni conducted parameter measurement of the Orgov Radio-Optical Telescope from 1985 to 1990, determining the self-noise of the telescope across its observational spectrum of 3-200mm wavelength (Far Infrared to EHF Microwave). In the 8mm wavelength, it was found to have self-noise of 2.6 Kelvin, which was the lowest and therefore the most sensitive among the world's largest antennas. The 8mm wavelength is near the strongest frequency component of the Cosmic Microwave Background Radiation (CMB).

On observation of 8mm wavelength during clear midnights of 23 and 24 November 1988 at 23-24h o'clock, there was no residual signal of the CMB at zenith (observing straight up):

In positions "on the way to zenith" and "zenith" we have the proportion for Antenna Self Noises (T_{SN}) [...] = 2.6K

The next important question is what means so low Self Noises (2,6 K or 2,8 K). According to the theory of the Big Bang in Universe it must have been Relict radiation of 2,7 K.

If it is right, then our measured noises near Zenith had to be 2,6 + 2,7 = 5,3K. But they are absent. It is also impossible that our 2,6 K is 2,7 K of Relict. Because it will be only in case, if our Antenna is ideal and its Self Noises are equal 0K. But it is impossible on Earth.

So there is only one explanation, that Relict radiation is absent in Universe, and it is that there never was any Big Bang in Universe.

Notably, the paper has only five references, all of which are self-citations.

== Anthropology ==
Later, Herouni turned his attention to megalithic structures, such as Carahunge (sometimes referred to as Zorats Karer) in Armenia. By using four telescopic methods, and the precession laws of Earth, he argued that Zorats Kaher is more than 7,500 years old; dating it to around 5500 BC. According to him, some of the stones mirror the brightest star of the Cygnus constellation—Deneb. Herouni wrote about his claims in his 2004 book, Armenians and Old Armenia. Archaeostronomer Clive Ruggles, writing about the site, stated that, "Inevitably there have been other claims—more speculative and less supportable—relating to the astronomical significance of the site. One is that it can be astronomically dated to the sixth millennium B.C.E. And direct comparisons with Stonehenge, which few now believe was an observatory, are less than helpful."

An overview of ancient astronomy in the Caucasus region briefly discussed Carahunge, citing a preliminary report of a recent survey as evidence that Carahunge indicated astronomical alignments to the Sun, Moon, and selected stars. The authors consider that Carahunge may have been a dual purpose site: a burial place for a significant person and a place for astronomically related ritual. A critical assessment found several problems with the archaeoastronomical interpretations of the site. The northeast avenue, which extends about 50 metres (160 ft) meters from the center, has been inconsistently associated with the summer solstice, the major northern lunistice, or the rising of Venus. However, this must remain conjectural as the holes are relatively unweathered and may not even be prehistoric in origin. Herouni had postulated that in order to use the holes in the megaliths for astronomical observations sufficiently precise to determine the date of the solstices, it would have been necessary to restrict the field of vision by inserting a narrow tube into the existing perforations. Without these modifications, for which there is no archaeological evidence, the claimed astronomical significance of the orientations of the holes vanishes. As a consequence, González-Garcia concluded that the archaeoastronomical claims for the site are untenable, although further investigations to determine the astronomical potential of Carahunge and similar sites are merited.

=== Armens as the origin of modern humans ===
Herouni made some claims in anthropology and history. Specifically, he claimed that modern humans derived from Armens, a group of people originated from the area of modern Armenia some 12000 years ago. This claim had no scientific evidence of support.

== Other works ==
=== AREV Solar Power Plant ===
Herouni worked on the AREV-1 which is a 100 kW solar thermal power plant based on heat absorption of reflected sunbeams and rotating a compressor by the heated air to generate power.

== Publications ==
=== in English ===
- Herouni P. M., Theoretical problems of double mirror spherical radio telescopes. Report at the XI General Assembly of Internat. Astronomical Union, San-Francisco, 8 p., USA, 1960.
- Herouni P. M. The First Radio-Optical Telescope. Trans. of the Sixth International Conference on Antennas and Propagation ICAP-89, pp. 540–546, IEEE-URSI, UK, 1989.
- Herouni P. M. Constructions and Operation of Radio-Optical Telescope ROT-32/54/2,6.- Trans. of the URSI Internat. Meeting of Mirror Antenna Construction, pp. 34–41, Riga, 1990.
- P. M. Herouni About Self Noises of Radio-Optical Telescope ROT- 54/2.6 Antenna, Journal of Applied Electromagnetism, Trans- Black Sea Region Union of Applied Electromagnetism, pages 51–57, Athens, Greece, June 1999.
- P. M. Herouni Armenians and Old Armenia: Archaeoastronomy, Linguistics, Oldest History, Yerevan, Armenia, 2004.

=== in Russian ===
- П. М. Геруни, ”Вопросы расчета сферических двухзеркальных антенн.”-Радиотехника и электроника, т.19, N1, с. 3–12., Москва, 1964.
- П. М. Геруни, ”Пятиметровая сферическая антенна миллиметрового диапазона”- Сб. “Антенны”, вып. 4, с. 3–15, “Связь”, Москва, 1968.
- П. М. Геруни, “Зеркальный радиотелескоп Геруни.” АС N 1377941 от 01.11.87 (приоритет от 02.01.86).
