= Orgov =

Orgov Օրգով
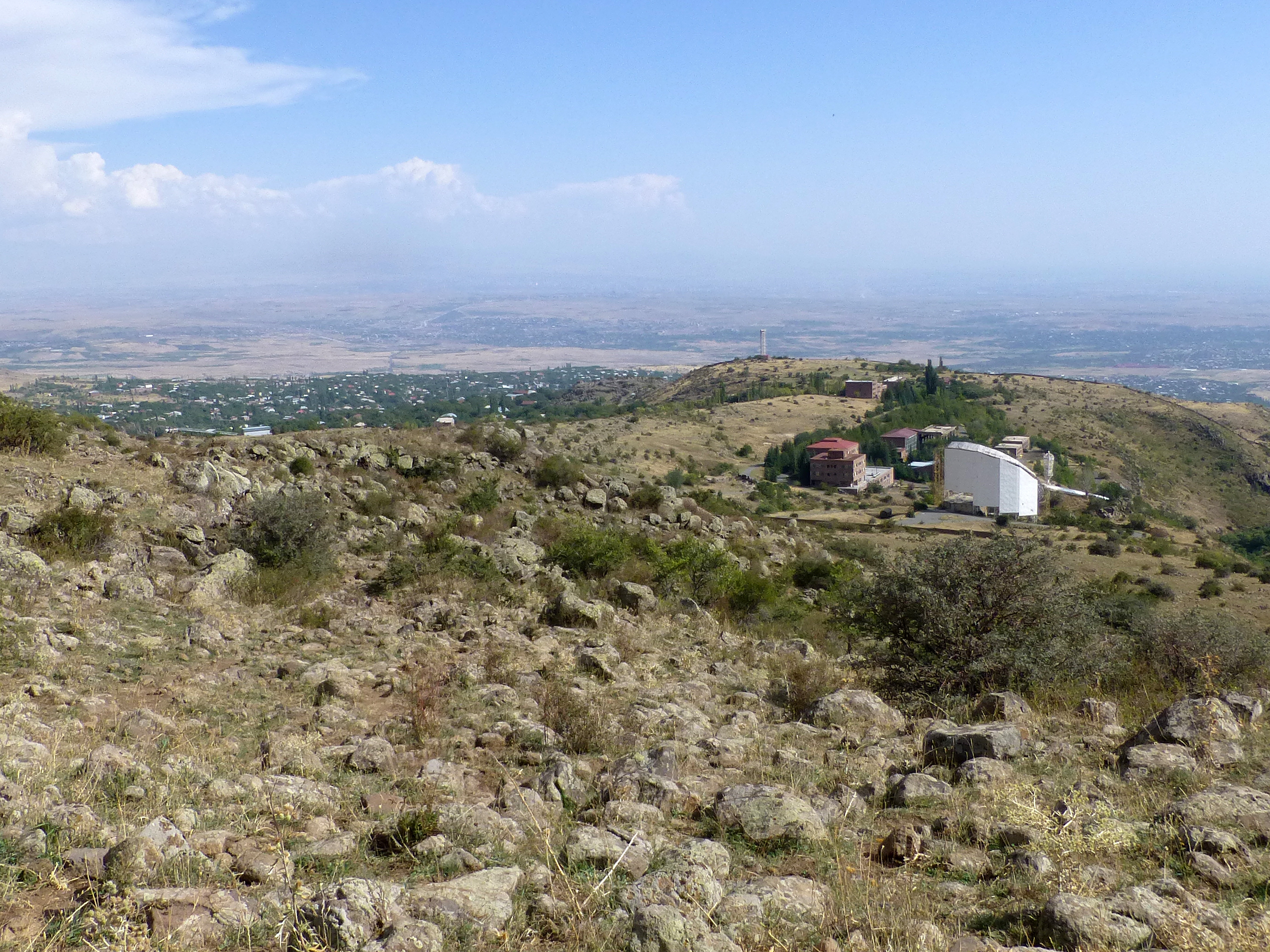
- Tegher-Centrale solaire et radiotélescope abandonnés

- Location within Armenia Location within Aragatsotn
- Coordinates: 40°20′52″N 44°15′09″E
- Country: Armenia
- Province: Aragatsotn
- Municipality: Ashtarak

Population (2011)
  - Total: 418
- Time zone: UTC+4
  - Summer (DST): UTC+5 ( )

Orgov (Armenian: Օրգով) is a village in the Ashtarak Municipality of the Aragatsotn Province of Armenia. Orgov is home to the Orgov Radio-Optical Telescope and remains of a Bronze Age fort.
