= Orgov Radio-Optical Telescope =

Telescope in Armenia

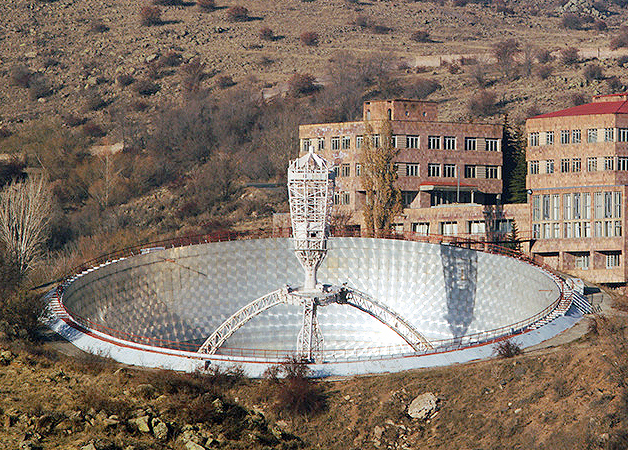
- Alternative names: Radio Optical Observatory ROT54
- Location(s): Orgov, Aragatsotn Province, Armenia
- Coordinates: 40°21′03″N 44°14′27″E
- Altitude: 1,711 m (5,614 ft)
- Built: 1975–1985
- First light: 1986
- Diameter: 54 m (177 ft 2 in)
- Secondary diameter: 5 m (16 ft 5 in)
- Location of Orgov Radio-Optical Telescope
- Related media on Commons

The Orgov Radio-Optical Telescope, also known as ROT54 or the Herouni Mirror Radio Telescope, is a radio telescope in Orgov, Armenia. It was built between 1975 and 1985 and was active between 1986 and 1990 before its use was halted. It was again operational until ceasing in 2012. Subsequently, many attempts have been made to restore and restart the ROT54.

== Specifications ==
The telescope is located at the RRI Aragats Scientific Centre in Orgov, Armenia. It is on Mount Aragats, at a height of 1,711 metres (5,614 ft).

The radio telescope has a diameter of 54 m (177 ft). It is hemispherical, and fixed to the ground, with a movable secondary mirror with a diameter of 5 m (16 ft). This provides a useful diameter of 32 m (105 ft). It has a surface accuracy around 70/100 μm, giving an operating wavelength of 30-3mm (10-100 GHz), and was originally designed to observe down to 1 mm (300 GHz).

The optical telescope has a 2.6 m (8.5 ft) mirror, with a 10 m (33 ft) focal length.

== History ==
=== Development ===
In 1964, Paris Herouni proposed the concept to Sergei Korolev. Korolev approved the project and, after various delays, work began in 1975. Active construction took place between 1981 and 1985.

Demolitions were set on the slope of Mount Aragats, to create a pit for the dish. Subsequently, concrete was poured into the pit, and 3600 flat metal panels were "walled up" in the pit, attached to iron pipes, to form the telescope's mirror. On average, each panel is one square meter in size. The panels were made of high-strength alloys of aluminum with copper, magnesium, and manganese. Of particular technical difficulty was the polishing of the panels. A very uniform surface is needed to receive radio waves in the millimeter and sub-millimeter ranges. Each panel was hand-molded and precision-finished to within 70 microns.

The telescope became operational in 1986. In the same year, Heruni received patent number 1377941 for "Mirror Radio Telescope Heruni". The remaining infrastructure was completed in 1987.

=== Operations and observations ===
The observatory was active between 1987 and 1990. It was affected by the 1988 Armenian earthquake but suffered no significant damage.

=== Decommission and restoration attempts ===
Telescope operations ceased around 1990. In the mid-1990s restoration of the telescope was proposed. In 1995–2010, the telescope was modernized with new control computers and new feeds, and observations resumed, in collaboration with the Astronomical Society of Russia and the National Technical University of Athens.

In 2012, ROT 54 / 2.6 operations ceased again, when a control arm failed, immobilizing the secondary mirror. The Armenian state could not cover the cost of repairs, and the research complex was mothballed. More than half the buildings at the GETSAI site were left vacant.

Future operation requires further upgrades to the control systems, comprehensive adjustments, replacement of outdated analog sensors with digital ones, and modernization of the data processing systems. According to experts, these upgrades will cost approximately $25 million.

In 2018–2019, a restoration project was prepared, to join the telescope to the European VLBI Network. Implementation was planned to begin in 2019.

== See also ==
- Arecibo Telescope (ground bowl fixed radio telescope in Puerto Rico)
- FAST (ground bowl fixed radio telescope in China)
- Byurakan Observatory, also on Mount Aragats
