= Portakar =

Traditional ritual stones in Armenia

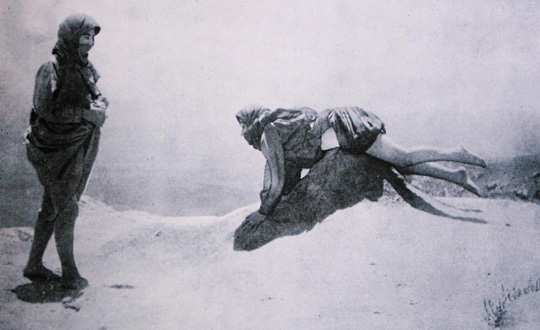
Portakar, ritual ceremony, Armenia, 19th century

Portakar or navel stones (Armenian: պորտաքար) are traditional ritual stones in Armenia. They are bound up with cult of the fertility goddess, called in ancient Armenia, like the cult of the goddess Anahit.

== History ==
According to Armenian mythology, women who wished to become pregnant must lean their stomach against the stone. Candle lighting was part of the cult. If a woman became pregnant she should come back and make a mark at the stone.
