= Carahunge =

Prehistoric archaeological site in Armenia

- Քարահունջ (Armenian)
- Karahunj, Qarahunj, Zorats Karer, Dik-Dik Karer, Tsits Karer, Karenish
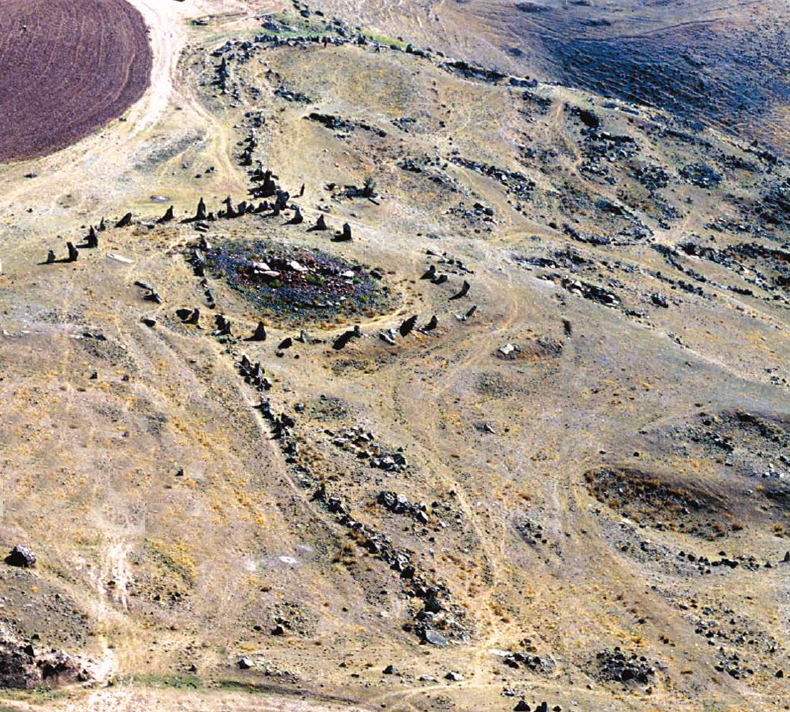

- Location within Armenia Location within Syunik Province
- 39°33′2.52″N 46°1′42.96″E
- Type: Possibly a necropolis and observatory
- Periods: Middle Bronze Age to Iron Age
- Location: Near Sisian, Syunik Province, Armenia

History
- Built: Construction date unknown

Site notes
- Condition: Protected by the government of Armenia
- Website: carahunge.com

Carahunge (Armenian: Քարահունջ, also romanized as Karahunj and Qarahunj), also known as Zorats Karer (Զորաց Քարեր), Dik-Dik Karer (Դիք-Դիք Քարեր), Tsits Karer (Ցից Քարեր) and Karenish (Քարենիշ), is a prehistoric archaeological site near the town of Sisian in the Syunik Province of Armenia. It is also often referred to among international tourists as the "Armenian Stonehenge".

== Location ==
The Carahunge site is at latitude 39° 34' longitude 46° 01' on a mountain plateau at an altitude of 1,770 metres (5,810 ft) and occupies an area of about 7 hectares on the left side of the canyon of the River Dar, a tributary of the river Vorotan (at 2 km). It is located on a rocky promontory near Sisian.

== Etymology ==
Thirteenth-century Armenian historian Stepanos Orbelian, in his book History of Syunic (I—XII centuries), mentions that in the Tsluk (Yevalakh) region of Armenia, near the town Syunic or Sisian, was a village called Carunge. Its name means "stone treasure" or "foundation stones" in Armenian.

The name Carahunge is interpreted as deriving from two Armenian words: car (or kar) (Armenian: քար), meaning stone, and hunge or hoonch (Armenian: հունչ), meaning sound. Thus the name Carahunge means "speaking stones". This interpretation is related to the fact that the stones make whistling sounds on a windy day, presumably because of multiple reach-through holes bored into the stones at different angles in prehistoric times.

In 2004, the site was officially named the Karahunj (Carahunge) Observatory, by parliamentary decree (Government Decision No. 1095-n, July 29, 2004).

Carahunge is also known in local lore as Zorats Karer (Զորաց Քարեր), Dik-Dik Karer (Դիք-Դիք Քարեր), and Tsits Karer (Ցից Քարեր), meaning "vertical stones" in vernacular Armenian.

== Stones ==
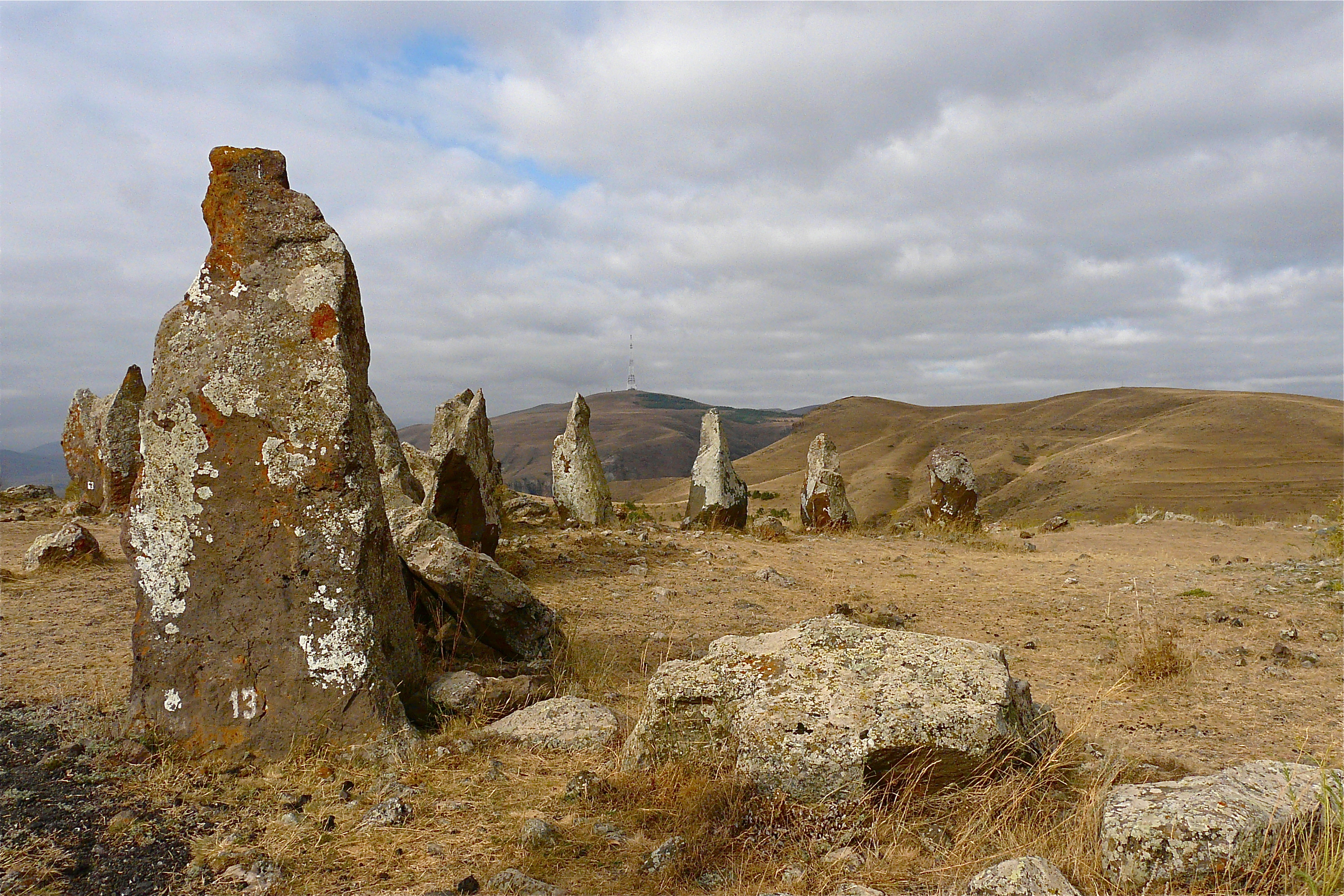
Part of the stone circle

Map showing the layout of the upright stones at Carahunge

The Carahunge monument consists of the central circle, the north arm, the south arm, the north–east alley, the chord across the circle, and separated standing stones. The site is rich with stone settings, burial cists and standing stones (menhirs). In total, 223 stones have been identified. There are also many unnumbered stones and fragments.

The stones are basalt (andesite), eroded by time and covered with moss and lichen of many colours. The heights of the stones above ground-level varies from 0.5 to 3 m, and their weights range up to 10 tons.

About 80 (or around 1/3) of the stones feature a circular hole. Only 37 of those stones, with a total of 47 holes, are still standing. They have been of interest to Russian and Armenian archaeoastronomers, who have suggested that the standing stones could have been used for astronomical observation. Seventeen of the stones were associated with observations of sunrise or sunset at the solstices and equinoxes, and 14 with the lunar extremes.

The inner surfaces of the holes bored into some of the stones are much better preserved than the outer surfaces. Since the holes are relatively unweathered, they may not be prehistoric in origin, so conjectures about their purpose must remain provisional.

== Archaeological research ==
The astronomical significance of the megalithic structures at Zorats Karer was first explored by Armenian archaeologist Onik Khnkikyan in 1984. A year later, Armenian astrophysicist Elma Parsamyan hypothesised about the existence of an astronomical observatory at Zorats Karer (Carahunge), and analysed other megalithic sites at Metzamor and Angeghakot.

An investigation by radiophysicist Paris Herouni and his research team in 1994–2001 led them to the now disputed conclusion that Carahunge is the world's oldest astronomical observatory. In 1999, Herouni got in touch with British-born American astronomer and archaeo-astronomer Gerald Hawkins, renowned for his analysis of Stonehenge in which he proposed its purpose as an ancient astronomical observatory. In a letter to Herouni, Professor Hawkins confirmed his Armenian colleague’s similar conclusions about Zorats Karer, stating, in particular: “I admire the precise calculations you have made. I am most impressed with the careful work you have done, and hope that the result will ultimately get recorded in literature.”

Zorats Karer was investigated in 2000 by archaeologists from the Institut für Vorderasiatische Archäologie, LMU Munich, as part of a field survey of prehistoric sites in southern Armenia. They identified the site as a necropolis dating mainly from the Middle Bronze Age to the Iron Age, finding enormous stone tombs from those periods within the area. Team leader Stephan Kroll also concluded that the lines of stones were the remains of a city wall, possibly from the Hellenistic period, that had been constructed mostly of rubble and loam, and in which the upright stones had acted as reinforcements.

Archaeoastronomer Clive Ruggles wrote that "Inevitably there have been other claims—more speculative and less supportable—relating to the astronomical significance of the site. One is that it can be astronomically dated to the sixth millennium BCE and direct comparisons with Stonehenge, which few now believe was an observatory, are less than helpful."

An overview of ancient astronomy in the Caucasus region briefly discussed Carahunge, citing a preliminary report of a recent survey as evidence that Carahunge indicated astronomical alignments to the Sun, Moon, and selected stars. The authors consider that Carahunge may have been a dual-purpose site: a burial place for a significant person and a place for astronomically related ritual.

A critical assessment of the site found several problems with the archaeoastronomical interpretations of the site. The northeast avenue, which extends about 50 meters from the center, has been inconsistently associated with the summer solstice, the major northern lunistice, or the rising of Venus. Herouni had postulated that in order to use the holes in the megaliths for astronomical observations sufficiently precise to determine the date of the solstices, it would have been necessary to restrict the field of vision by inserting a narrow tube in the existing perforations. Without these modifications, for which there is no archaeological evidence, the claimed astronomical significance of the orientations of the holes vanishes. As a consequence, González-Garcia concluded that the archaeoastronomical claims for the site are untenable, although further investigations to determine the astronomical potential of Carahunge and similar sites are merited.

About 15 km west of Carahunge is located the prehistoric site of Godedzor that goes back to about 4000 BC. This was an important centre for obsidian trade in Syunik obsidian that had links with the sites located as far as Lake Urmia in Iran.

== Museum ==
In the nearby city of Sisian is a small museum dedicated to findings in the area. These include palaeolithic petroglyphs found on mountain tops in the area, and grave artefacts from the Bronze Age burial site, which has more than 200 shaft graves.

== Gallery ==
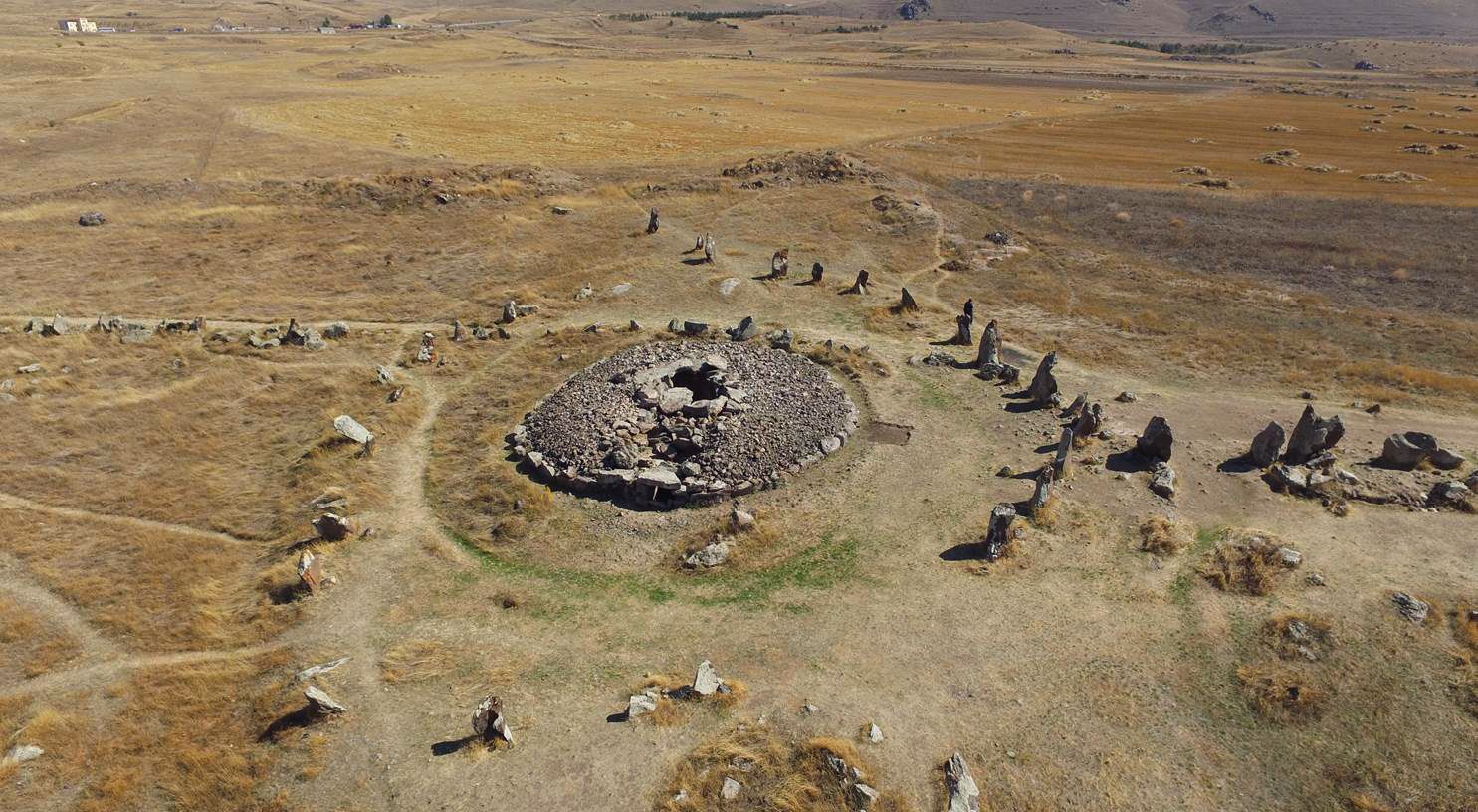

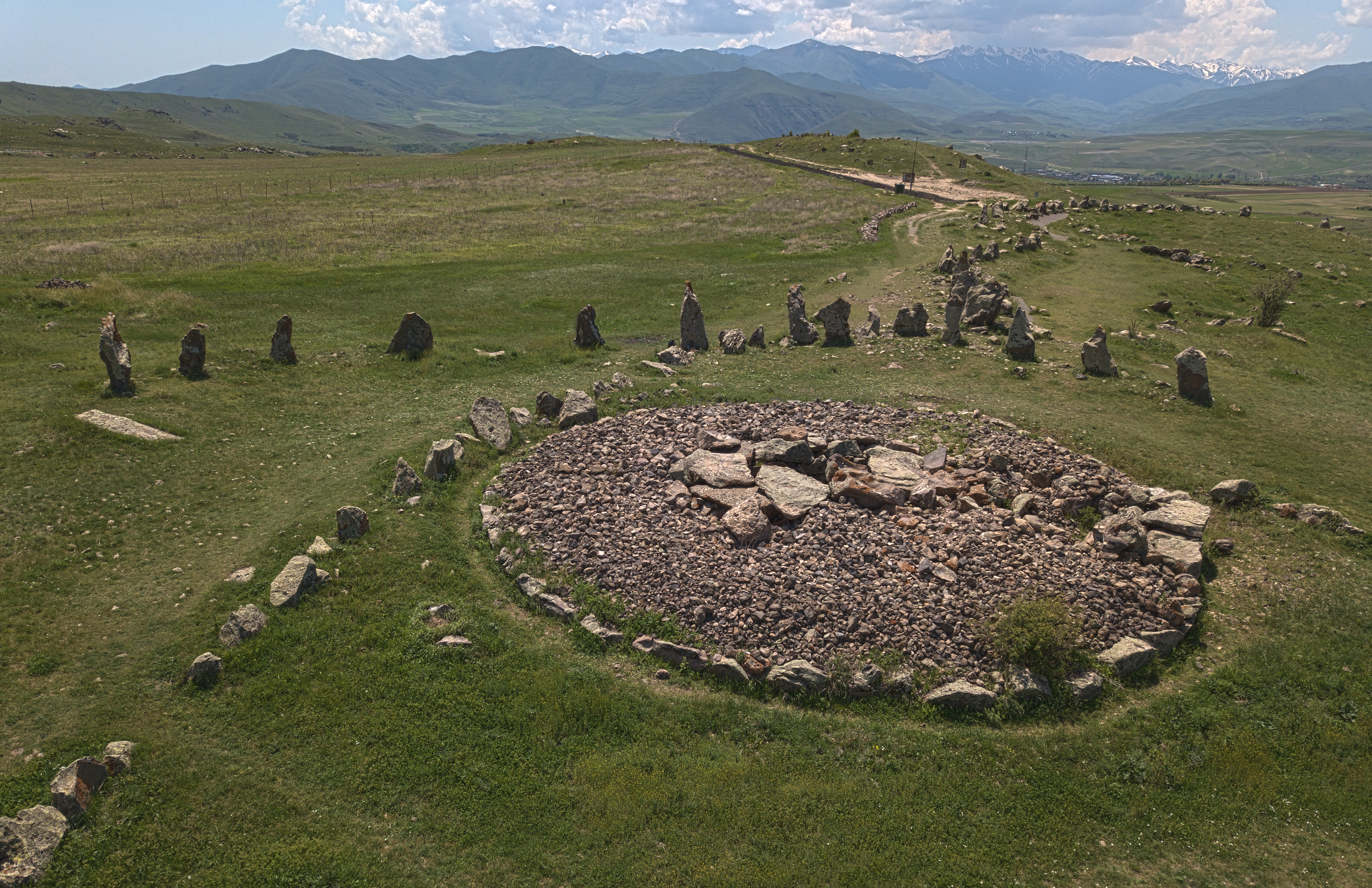

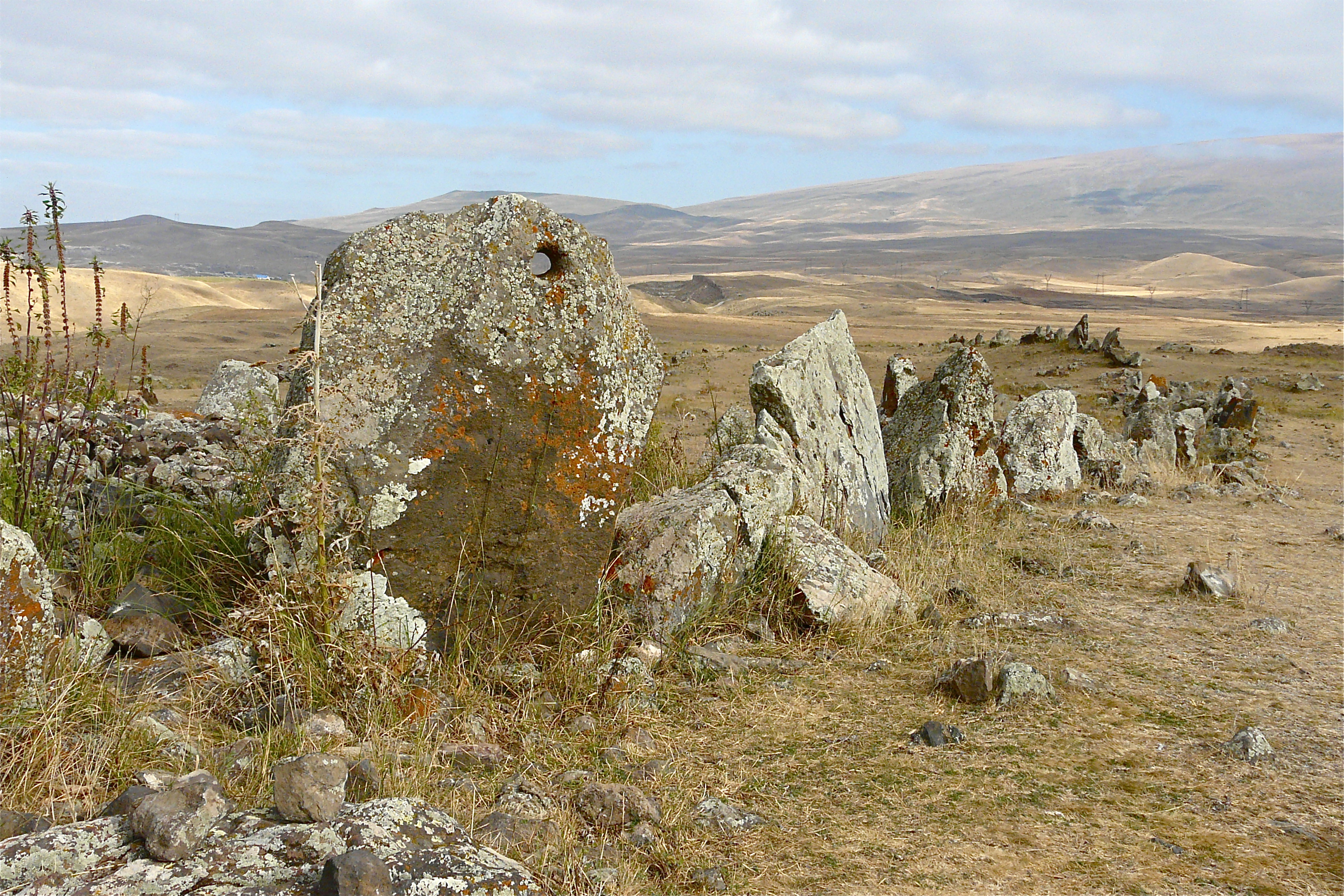

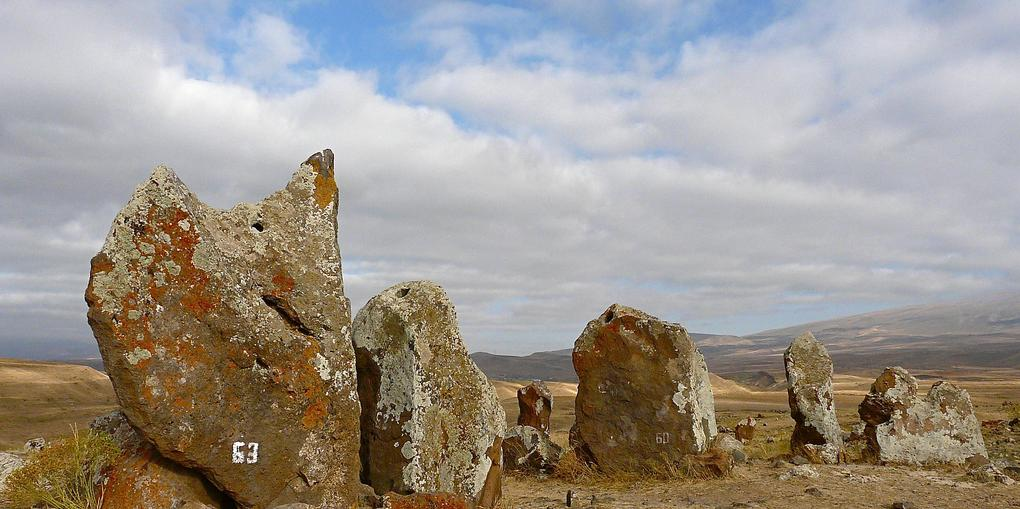

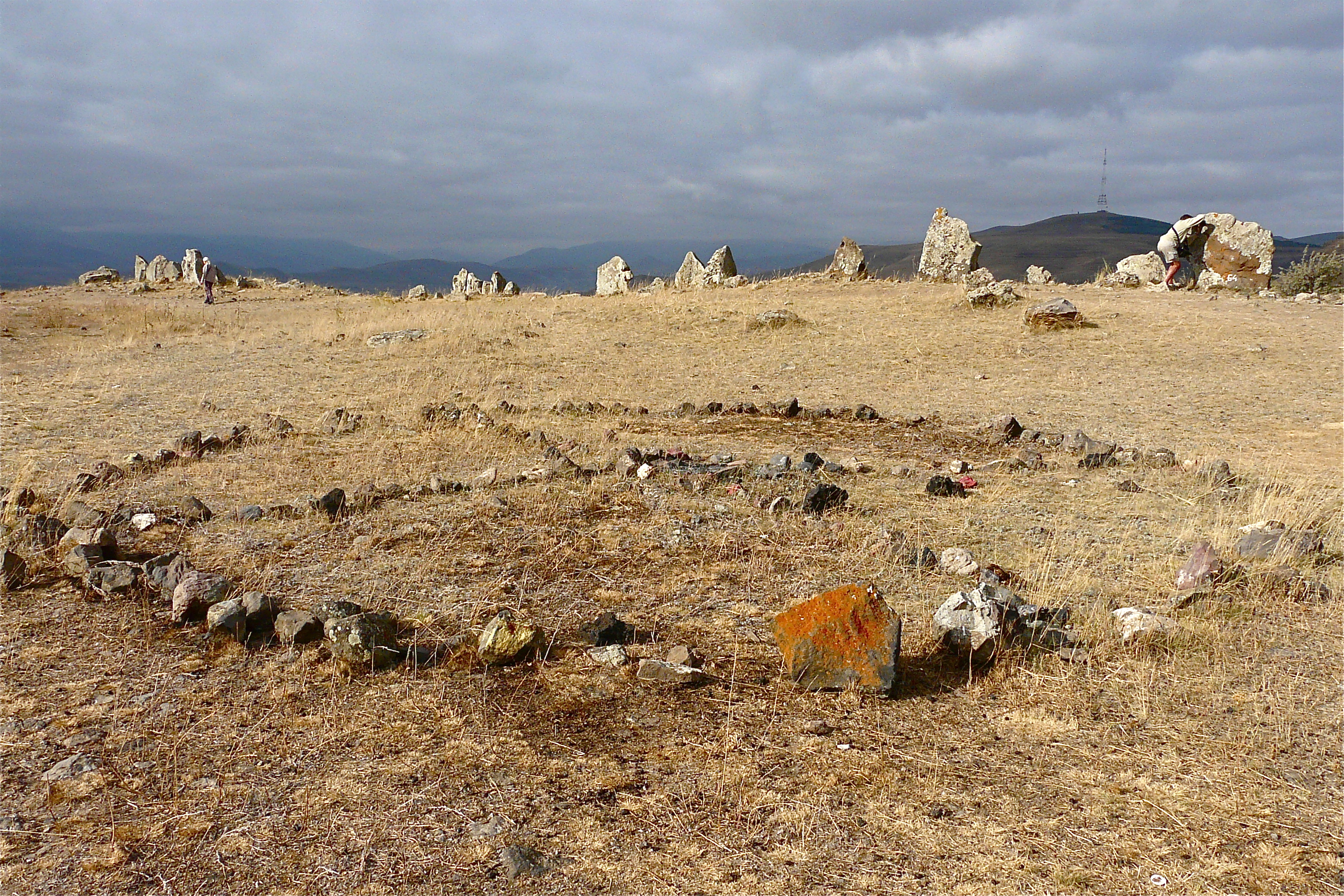
Interior part

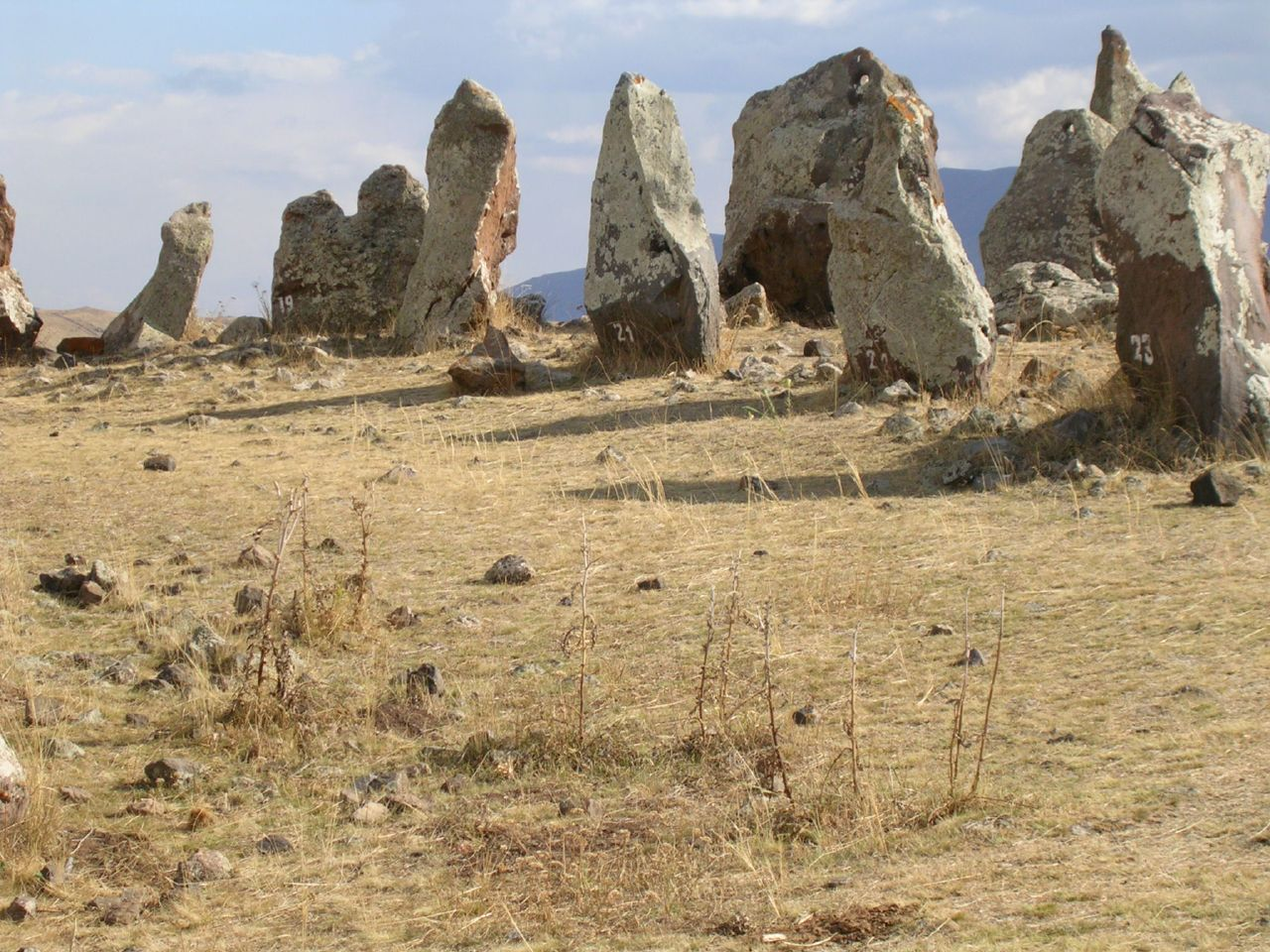

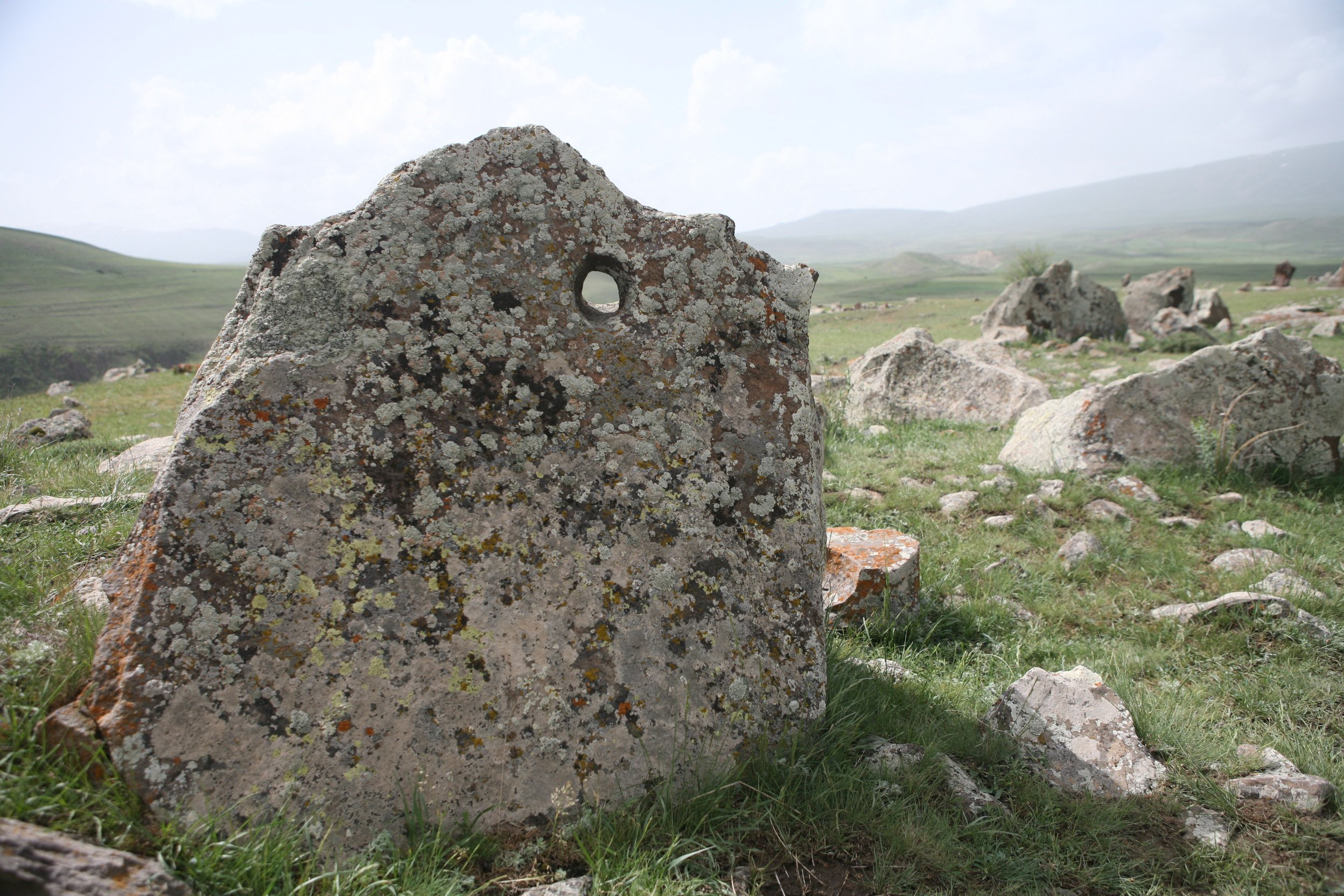

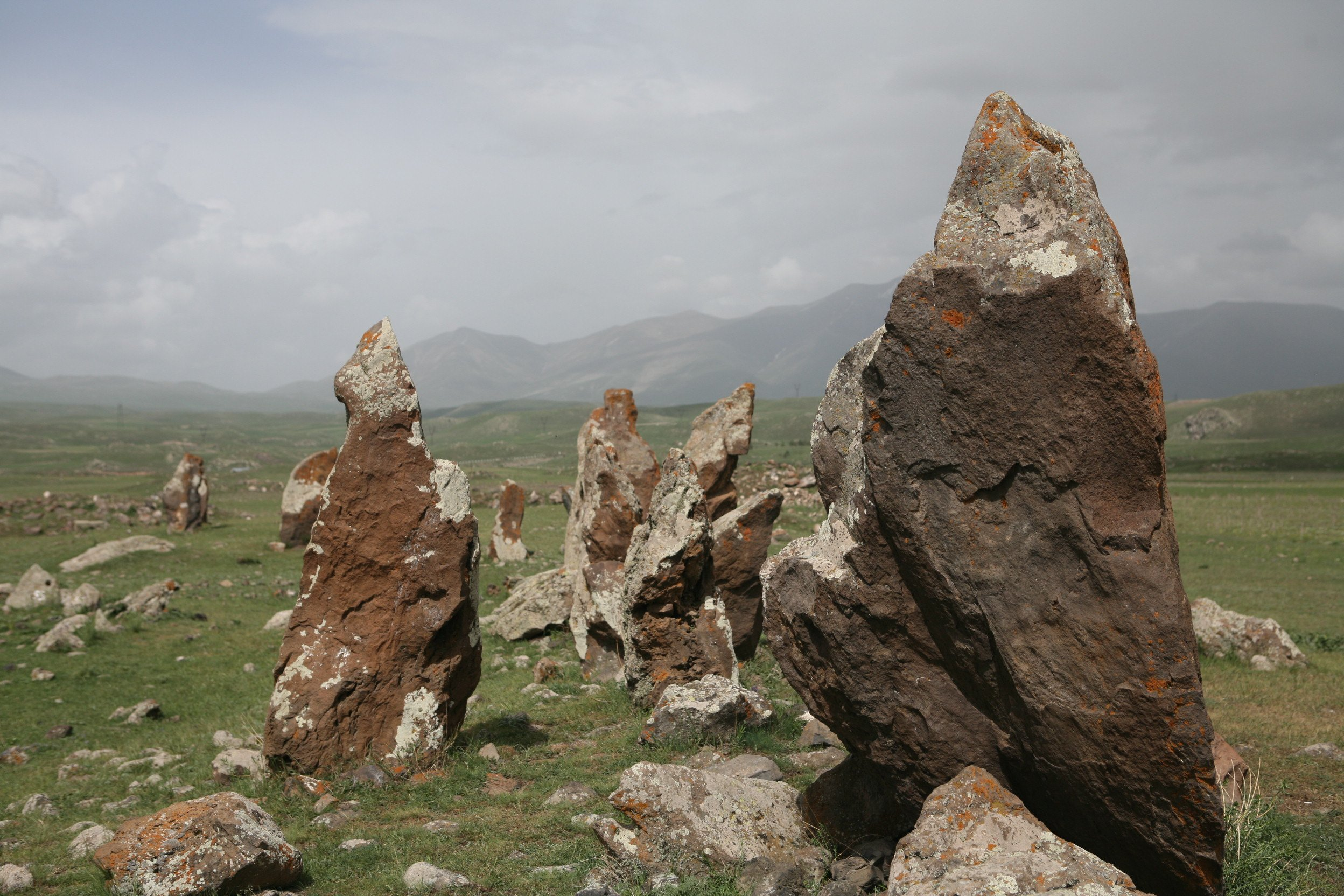

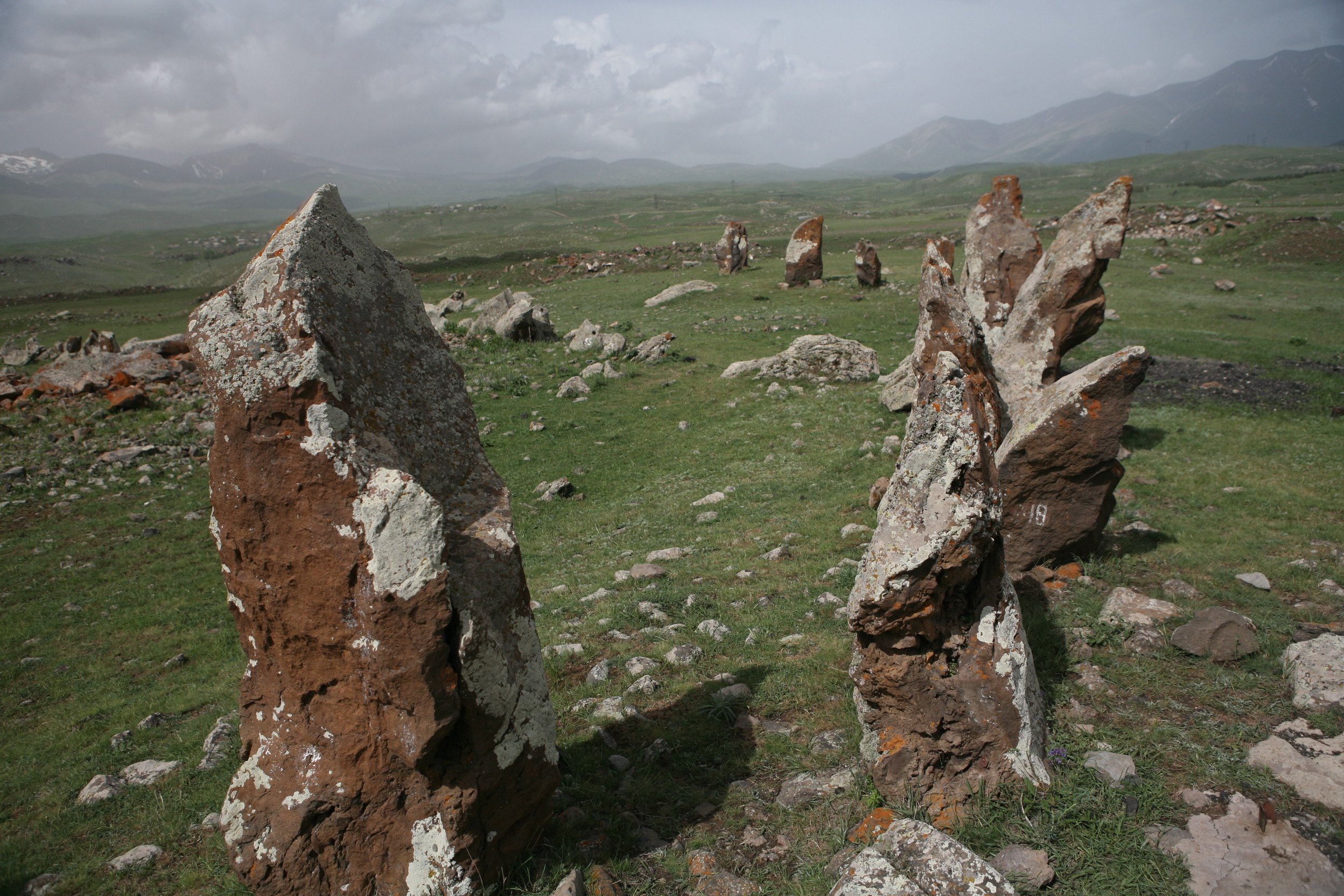

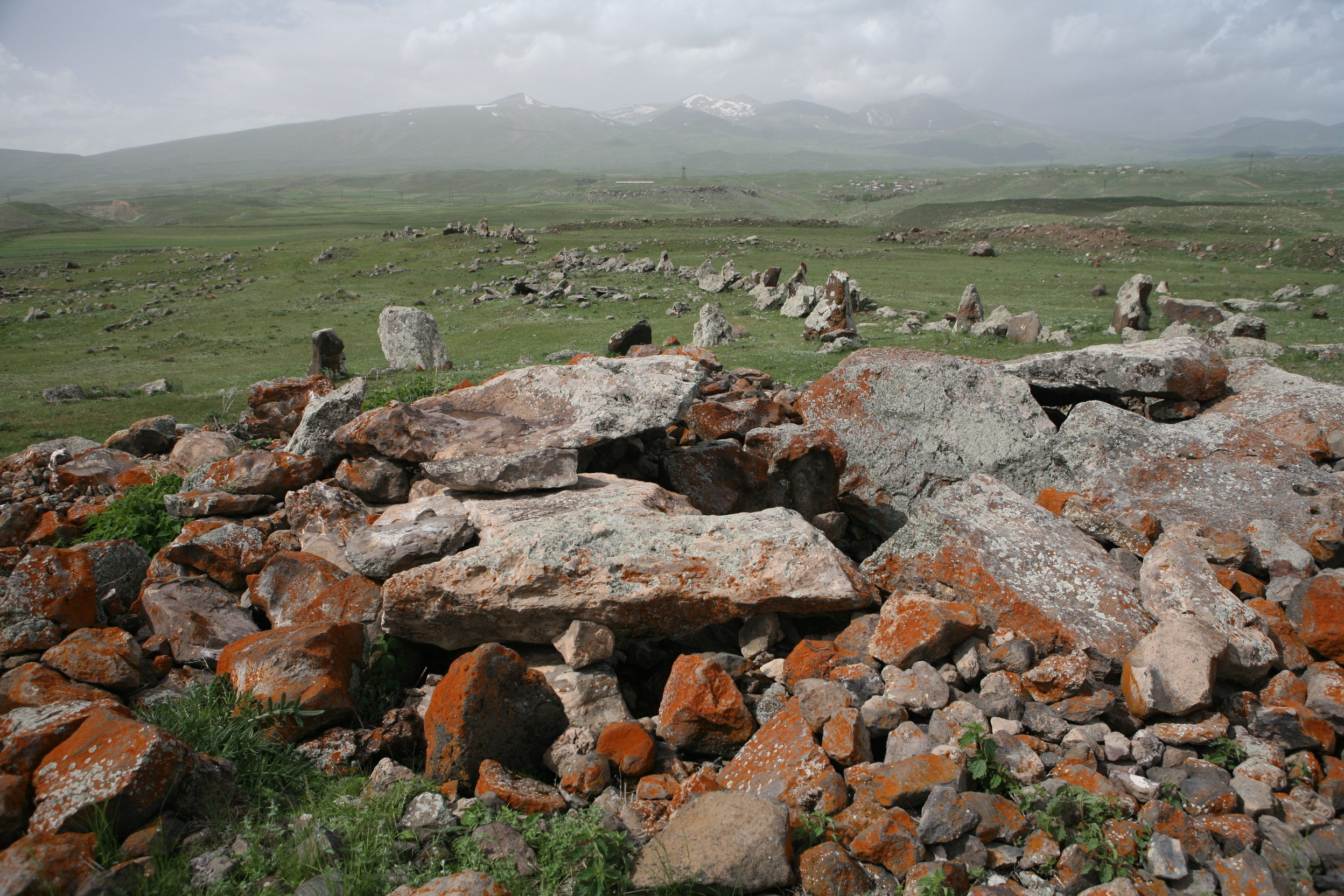

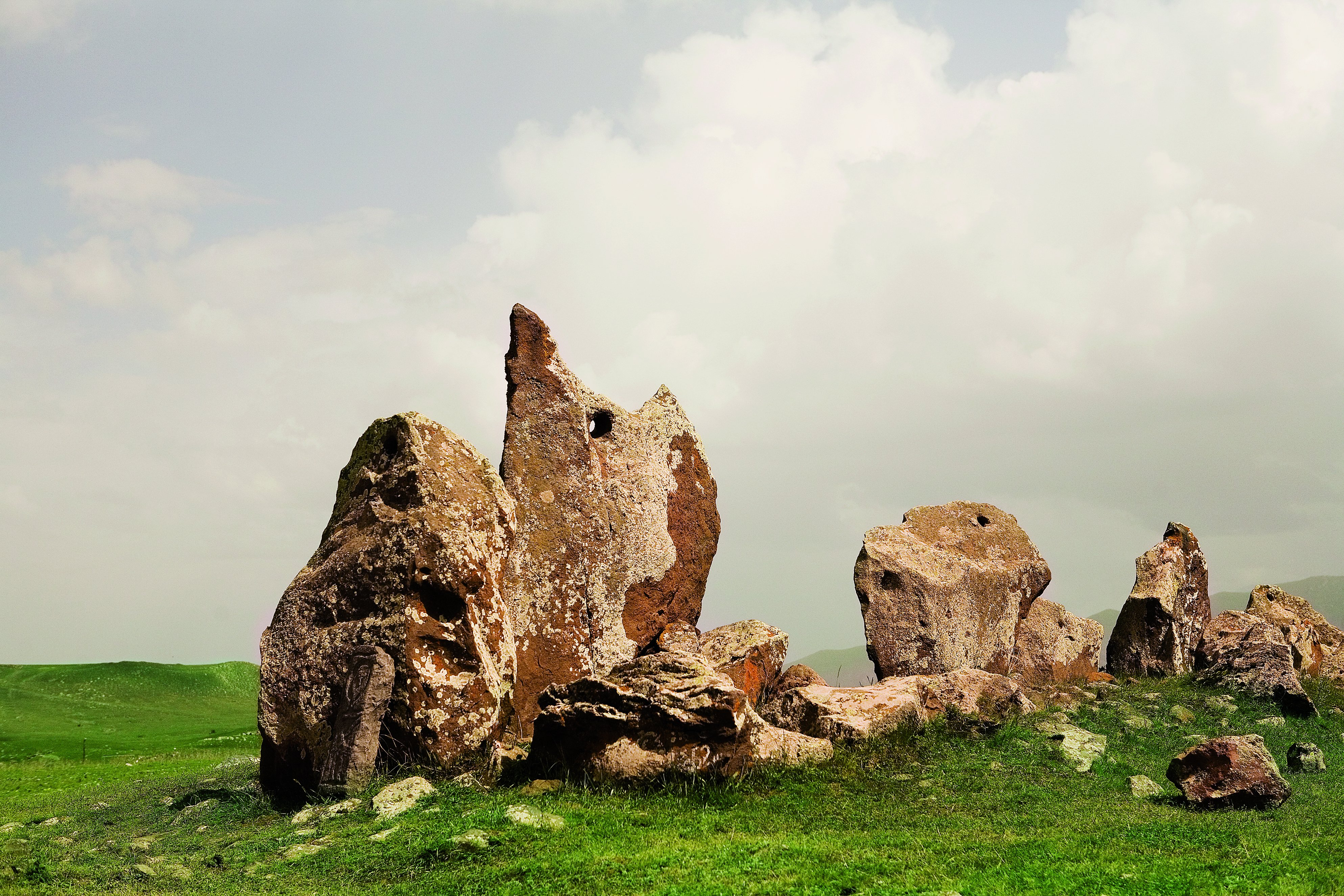

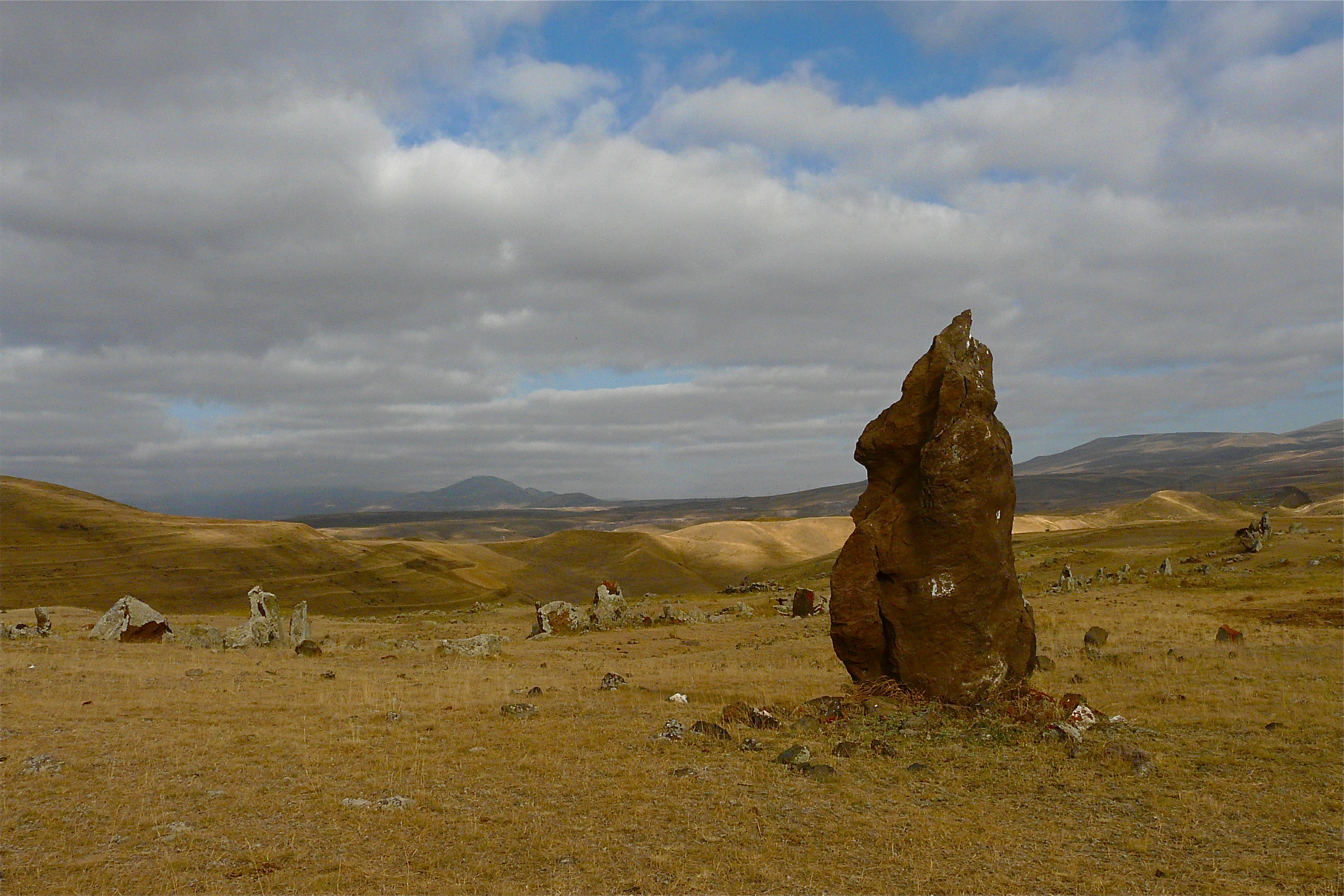

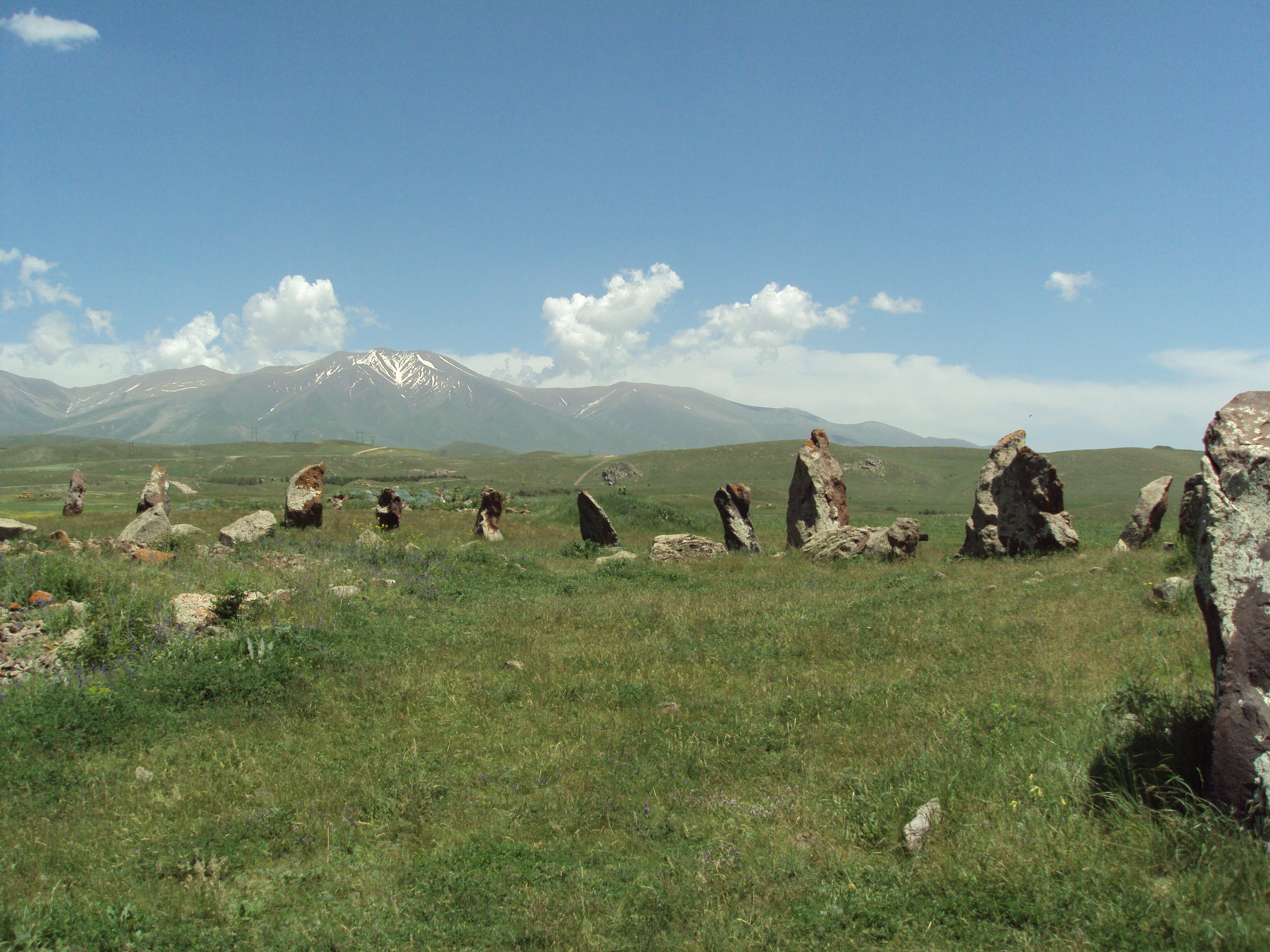

== See also ==
- Hartashen Megalithic Avenue
- Megalith
- Ughtasar Petroglyphs
