= Peerie Willie Johnson =

Scottish folk guitarist and bassist

"Peerie" Willie Johnson (William Henry Johnson) (10 December 1920 in Yell, Shetland – 22 May 2007 in Lerwick, Shetland) was a Scottish folk guitarist and bassist. He was respected as an influential and innovative musician in the Shetland folk scene. Since 2005 there has been a "Peerie" Willie Guitar Festival" each year on the islands.

"Peerie" is a Shetland dialect word, meaning "small" or "little".

== Early life and career ==
Johnson was well known for a playing style described as "dum chuck" combining elements of American Western swing and jazz with traditional Shetland fiddling music. He was associated with the stylistically opposite fiddle player Dr Tom Anderson, and was an influence on Aly Bain (fiddle) and Martin Taylor (guitar).

Johnson's childhood was plagued by ill health which interrupted his schooling; he left school without qualifications. However, he took up music after seeing a photograph of a ukulele-playing cowboy. Starting on the instrument, he soon switched to the guitar, despite the fiddle's status as lead instrument in Shetland's folk music.

A meeting with Anderson in 1936 got him a job with the local Islesburgh Dance Band, then the biggest band in Shetland. Hearing Eddie Lang and Django Reinhardt on the radio, he adapted their guitar style to Shetland's music, creating a sound that sounded "like a bass and a guitar playing together" according to fellow musician and writer Archie Fisher. Fisher states that at one festival in Johnson's last years he was surrounded by guitarists from around the world, listening to him play. "They were all sitting there like disciples", such was the respect that Johnson held in the folk music world.

In 2005 Johnson was one of the first inductees into the Scottish Traditional Hall of Fame.

== Recordings ==
Johnson made recordings of his music which can be found on anthologies such as Shetland Folk Fiddling, and on records and DVDs by Aly Bain, who also featured him on his Aly Bain and Friends television programme.
