= Hartashen, Shirak =

Village in Shirak, Armenia

Hartashen Հարթաշեն
- Location within Armenia Location within Shirak
- Coordinates: 41°00′34″N 43°55′22″E
- Country: Armenia
- Province: Shirak
- Municipality: Ashotsk
- Elevation: 2,030 m (6,660 ft)

Population (2011)
  - Total: 153
- Time zone: UTC+4

Hartashen (Armenian: Հարթաշեն) is a village in the Ashotsk Municipality of the Shirak Province of Armenia.

== Demographics ==
The population of the village since 1873 is as follows:

Historical population
Year	Pop.	±% p.a.
1873	328	—
1897	428	+1.11%
1926	442	+0.11%
1939	652	+3.04%
1959	241	−4.85%
1970	241	+0.00%
1979	219	−1.06%
2001	188	−0.69%
2011	153	−2.04%
