= Ughtasar Petroglyphs =

Rock-carvings on Mount Ukhtasar Pilgrim Mountain, Sisian, Syunik, Armenia

Coordinates: 39.684°N 46.050°E

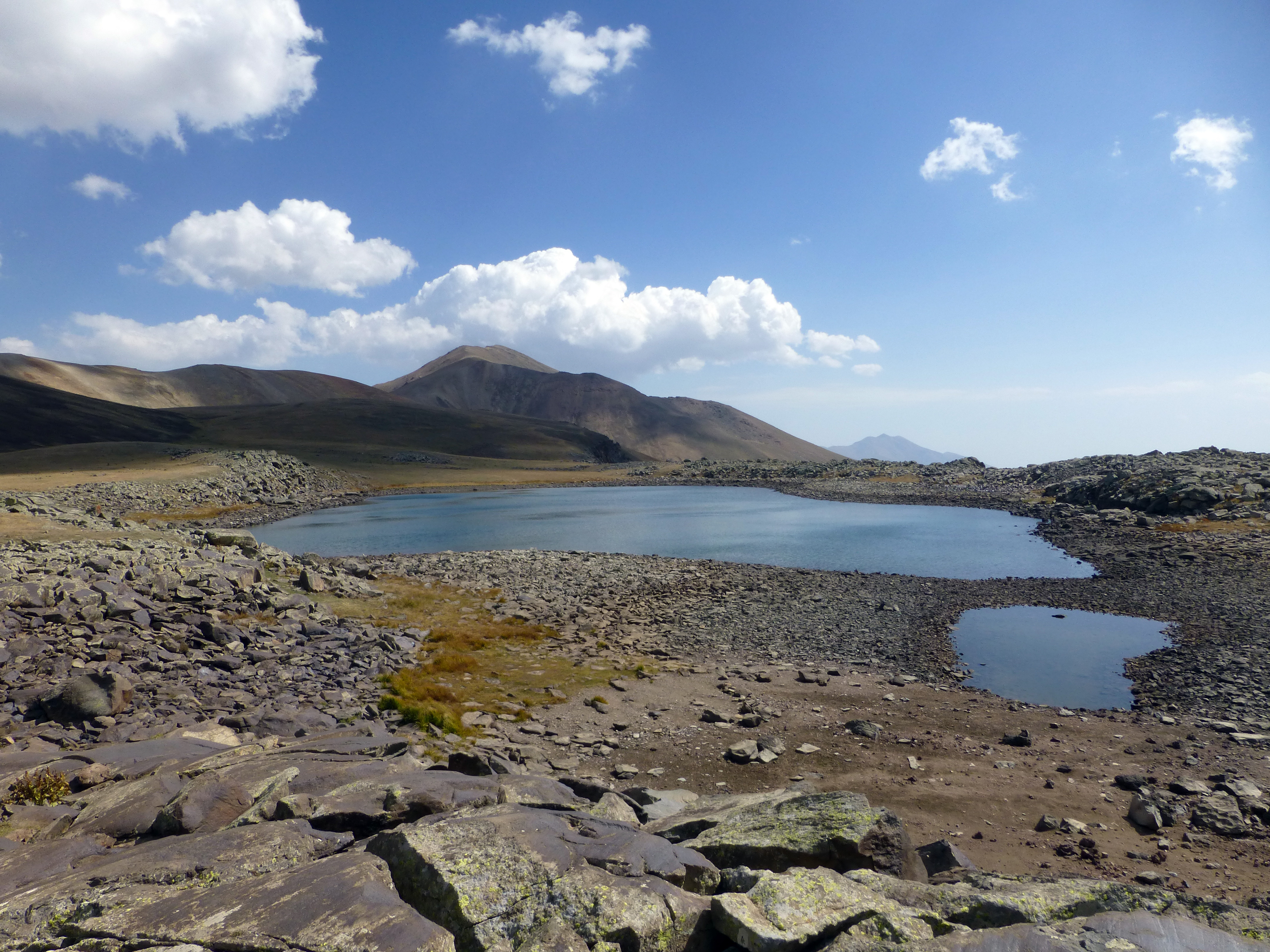
Ughatasar lake

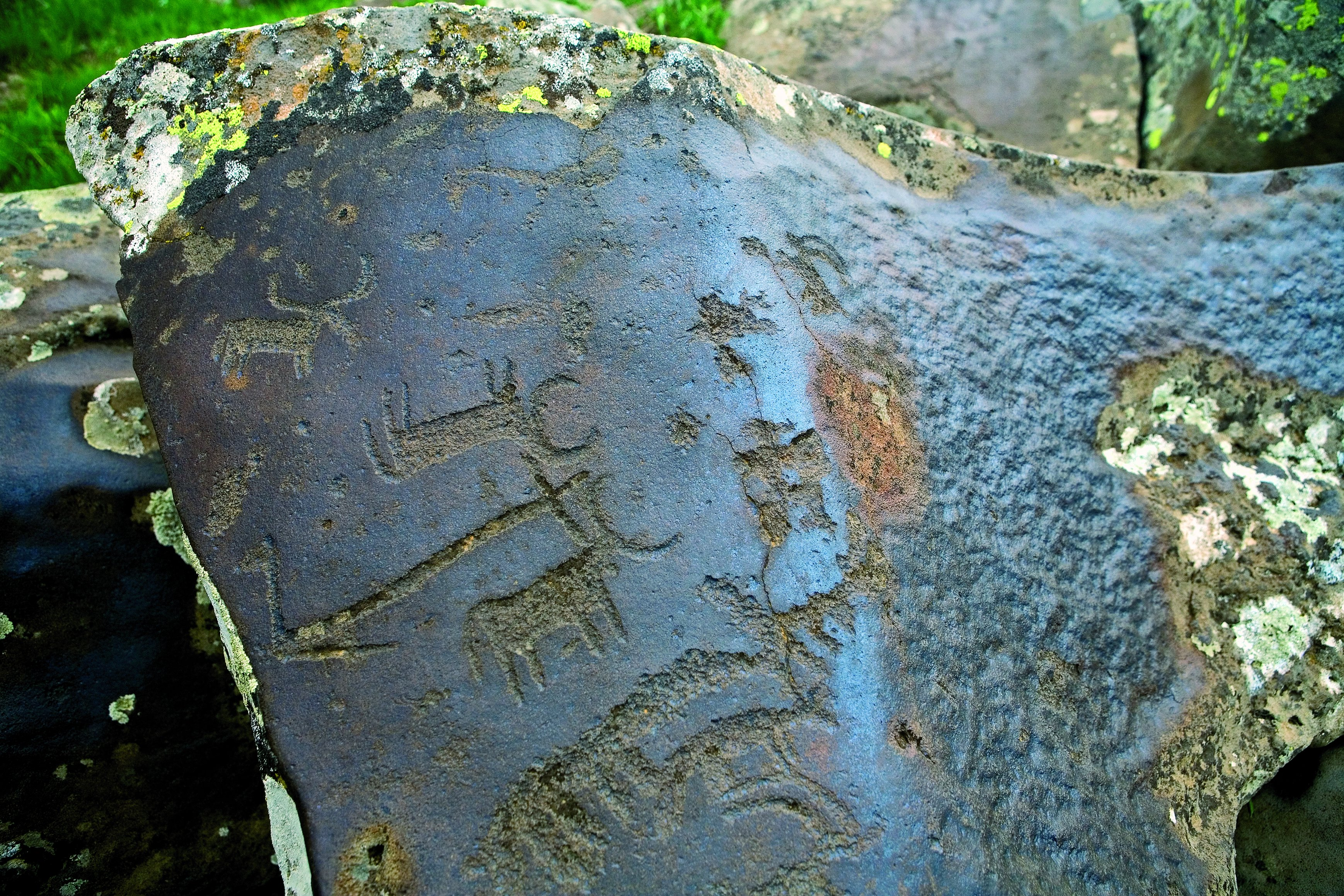
Bull petroglyphs

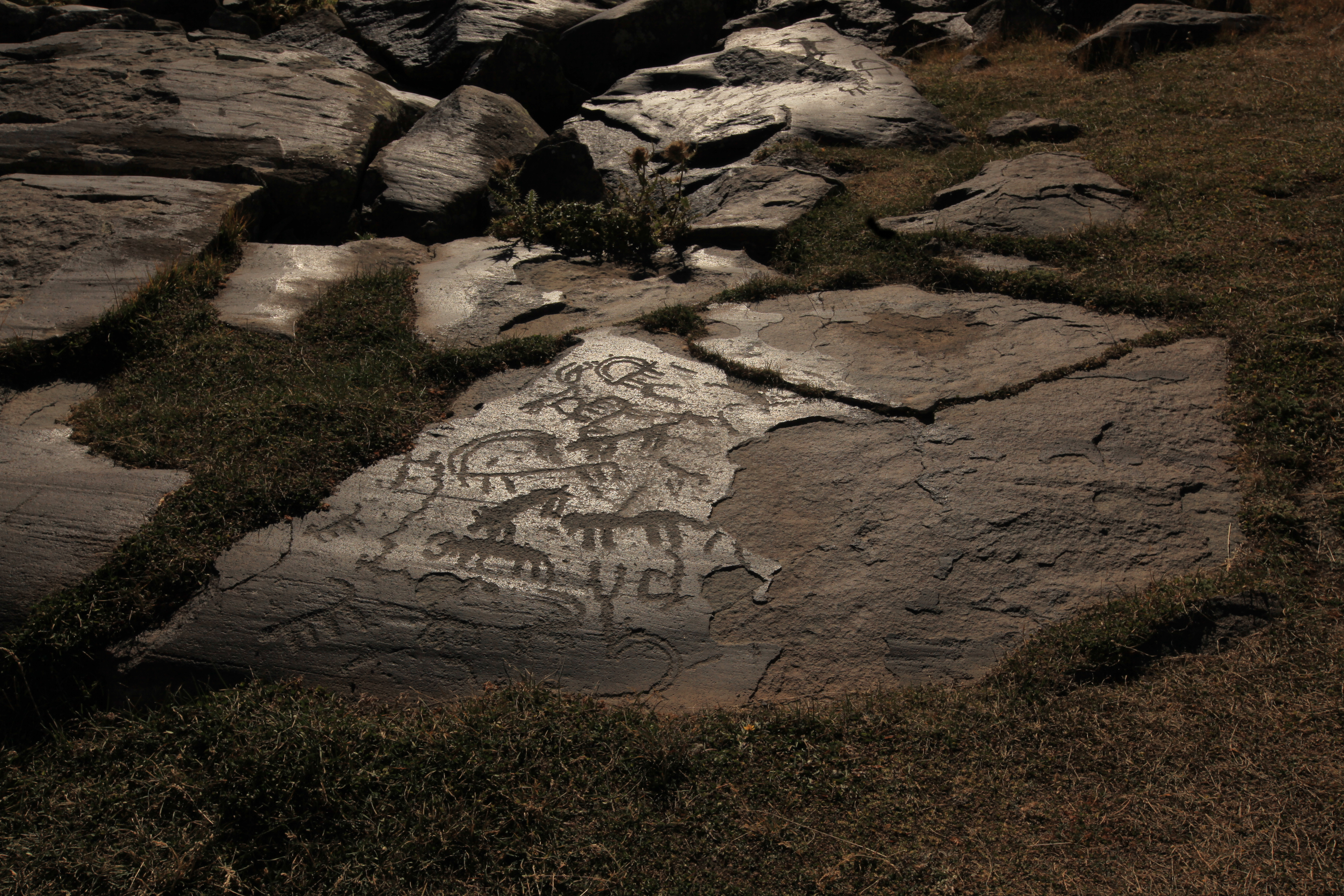
Petroglyphs of goats and others

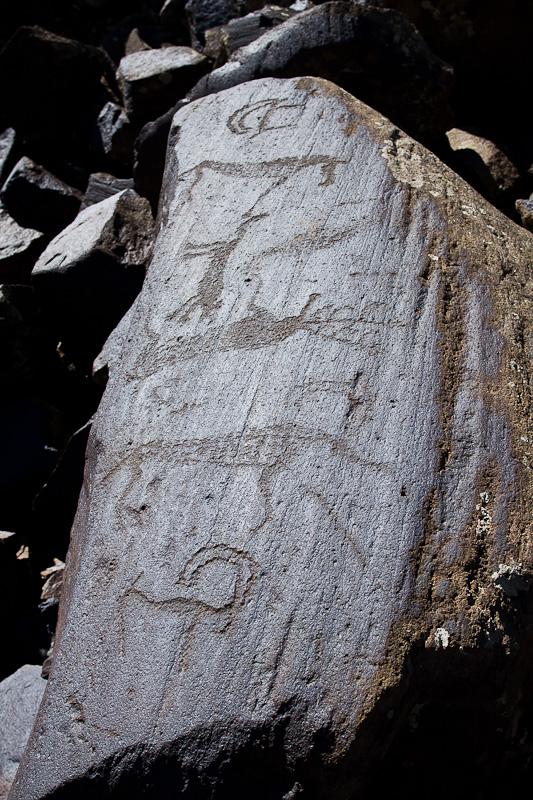
Petroglyphs of animals

The Ukhtasar Petroglyphs (Armenian: Ուխտասարի ժայռապատկերներ) are rock-carvings found on Mount Ukhtasar near the town of Sisian in Armenia's southern province of Syunik.

Over 1,000 decorated rock fragments extend to the foot of the mountain. These petroglyphs, some believed to date back to the Paleolithic (12,000 BCE), are carved onto dark brownish-black volcanic stones left behind by an extinct volcano. Later Chalcolithic and Bronze Age cultures continued to create petroglyphs at the site; "the largest variety and number of carvings date to this period and the early Iron Age, before it was finally abandoned except for a few carvings made by lonely shepherds spending their summers on the mountain top." Although the site was discovered in the early 20th century, it was not really studied until the 1920s and again in the late 1960s; it is still not fully understood today.

The carvings on the rock fragments depict hunting scenes, a wide array of animals, spirals, circles and geometric shapes, and even zodiac signs. Research suggests that the area served as a temporary dwelling for nomadic cattle-herding tribes, and studies of the rock carvings indicate that they were in use for hundreds of years, with peoples of later eras adding their own engravings to the stones.

Reproductions of the petroglyphs, or rock engravings, of Ughtasar can be found all over Yerevan; they are inscribed onto silver jewelry, painted onto coffee cups, traced into hand-made pottery, and they adorn the walls of cafes. Reaching the petroglyphs of Ughtasar can be challenging.

== Gallery ==
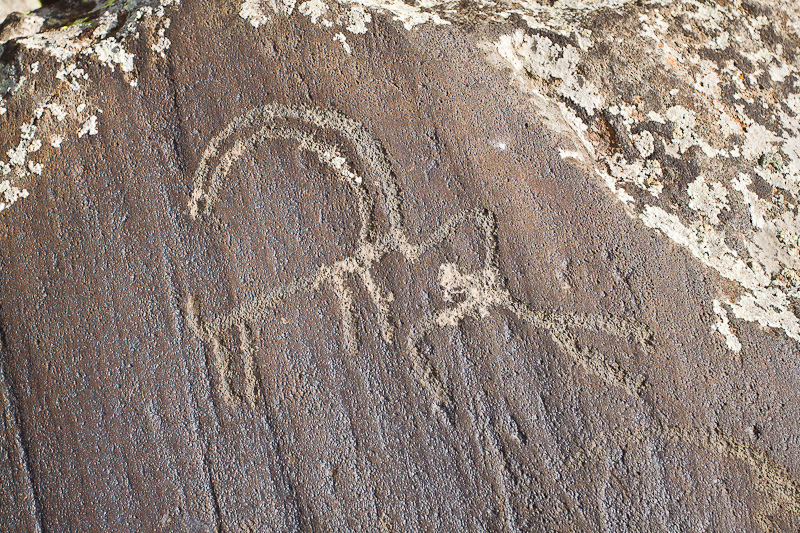

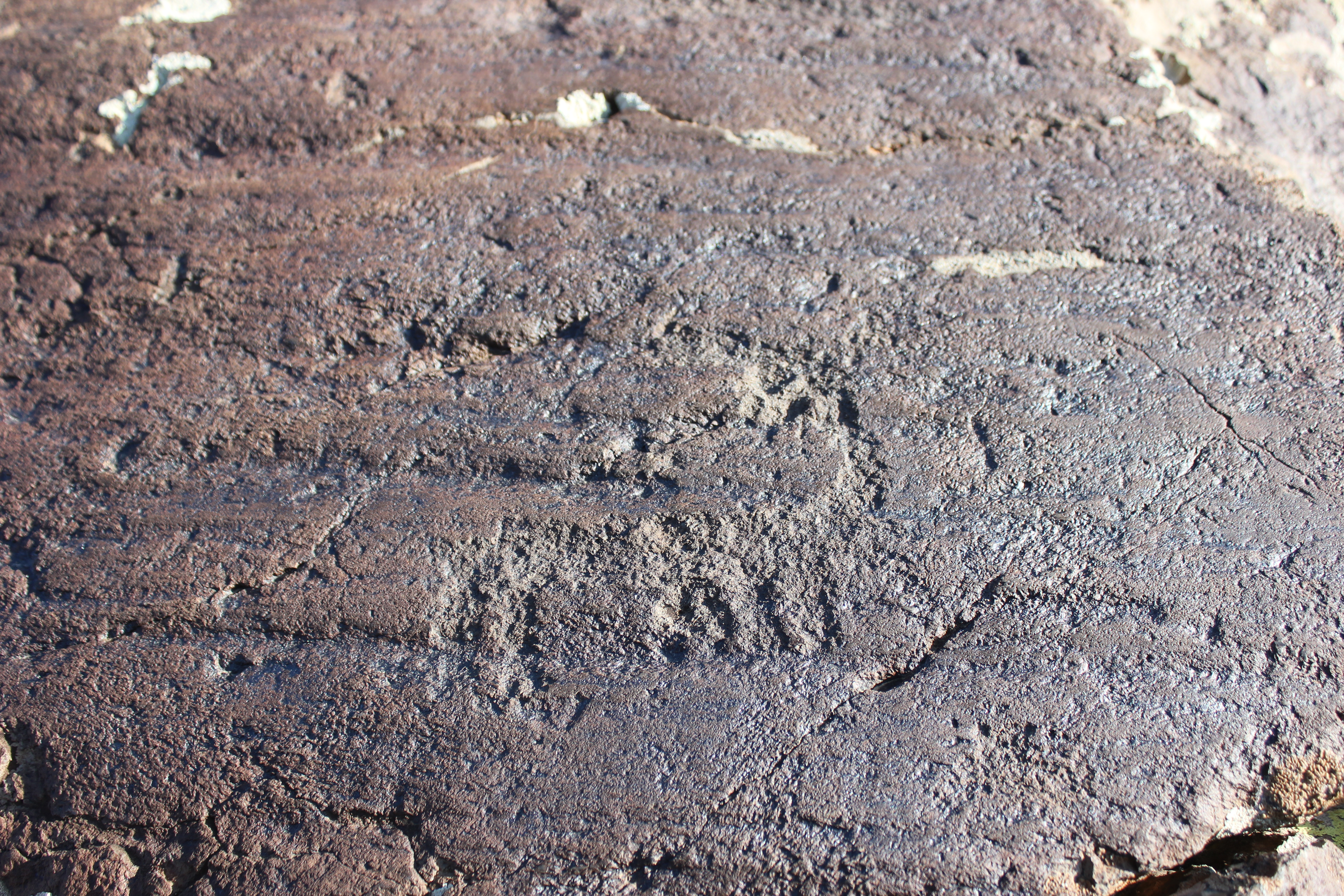

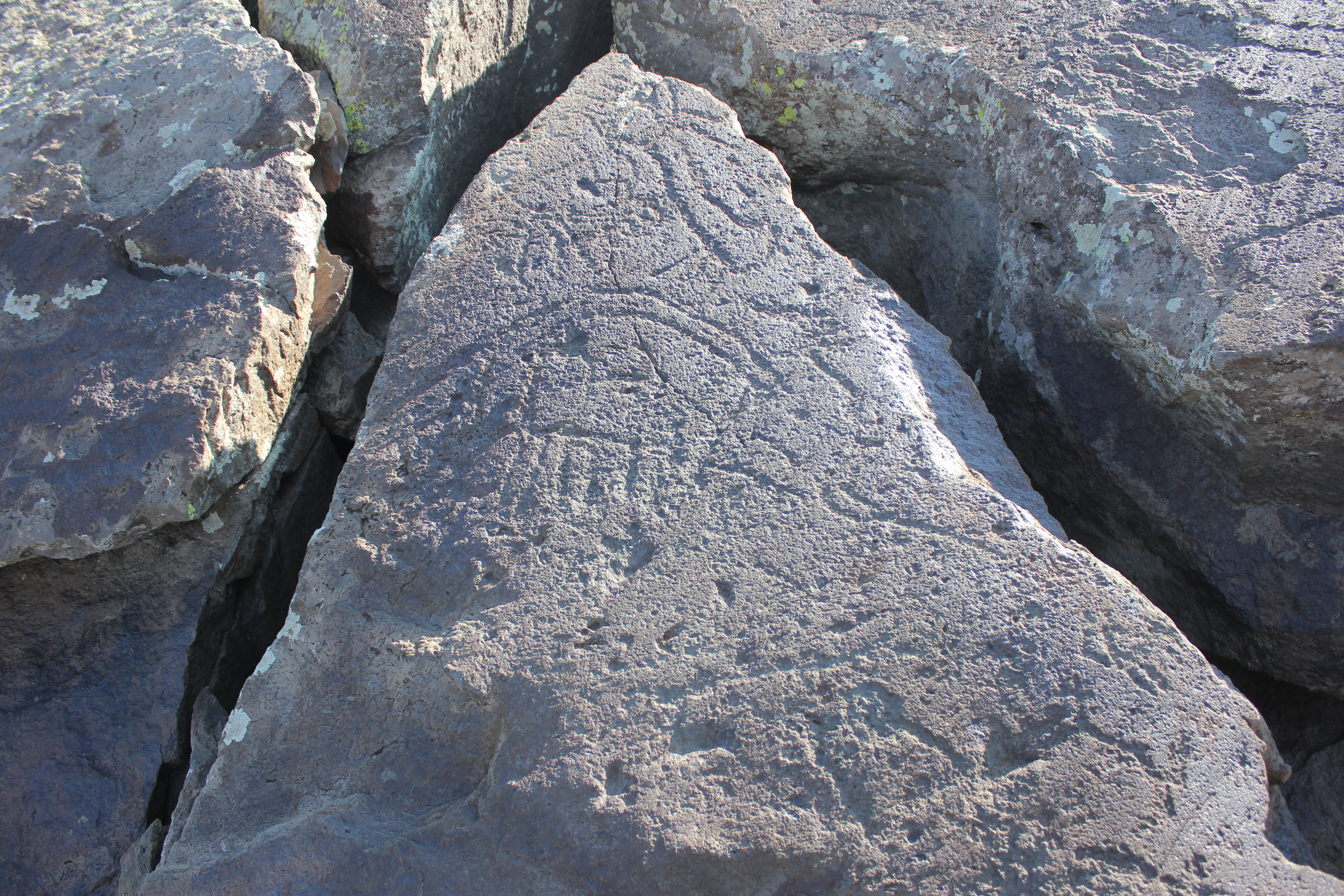

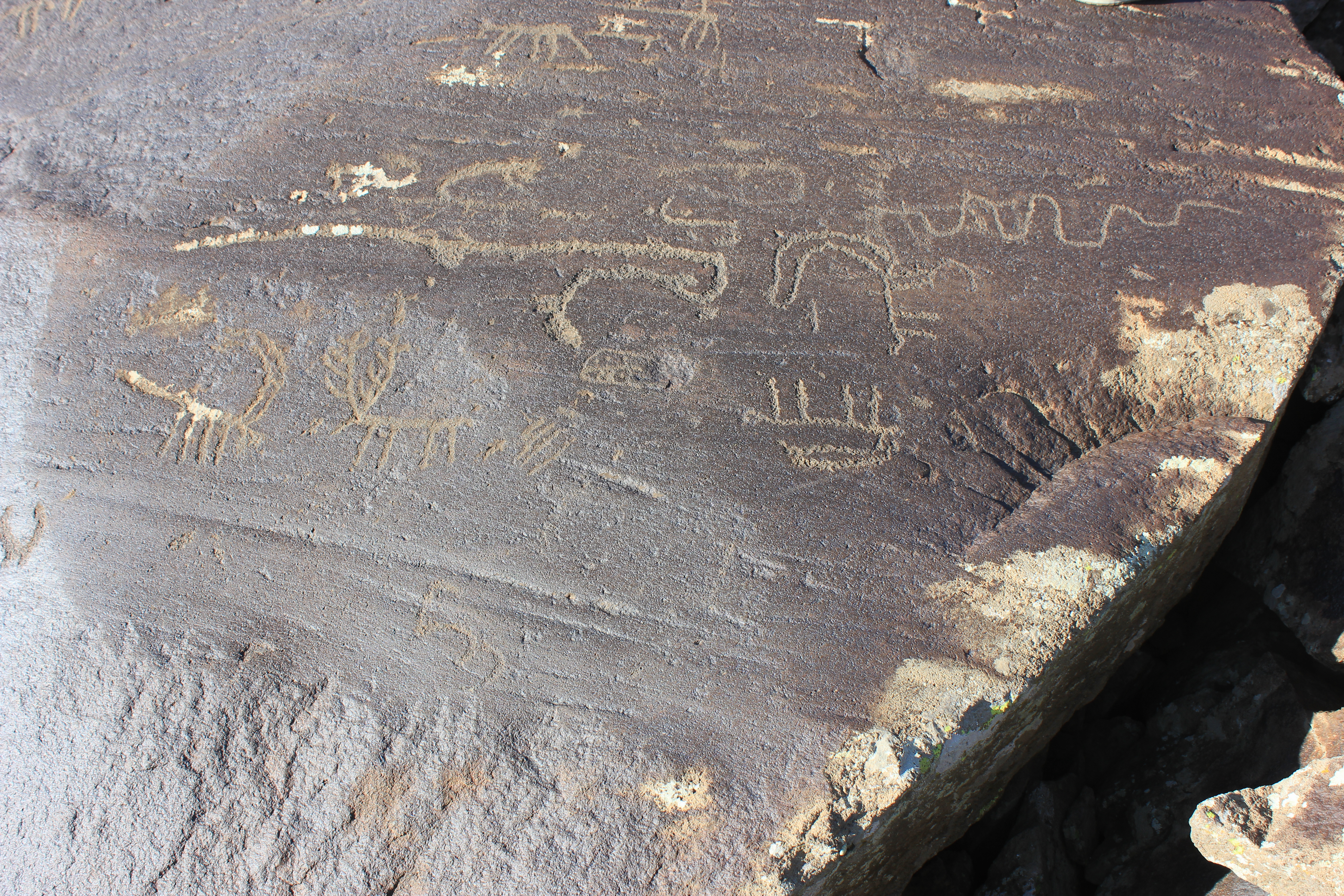

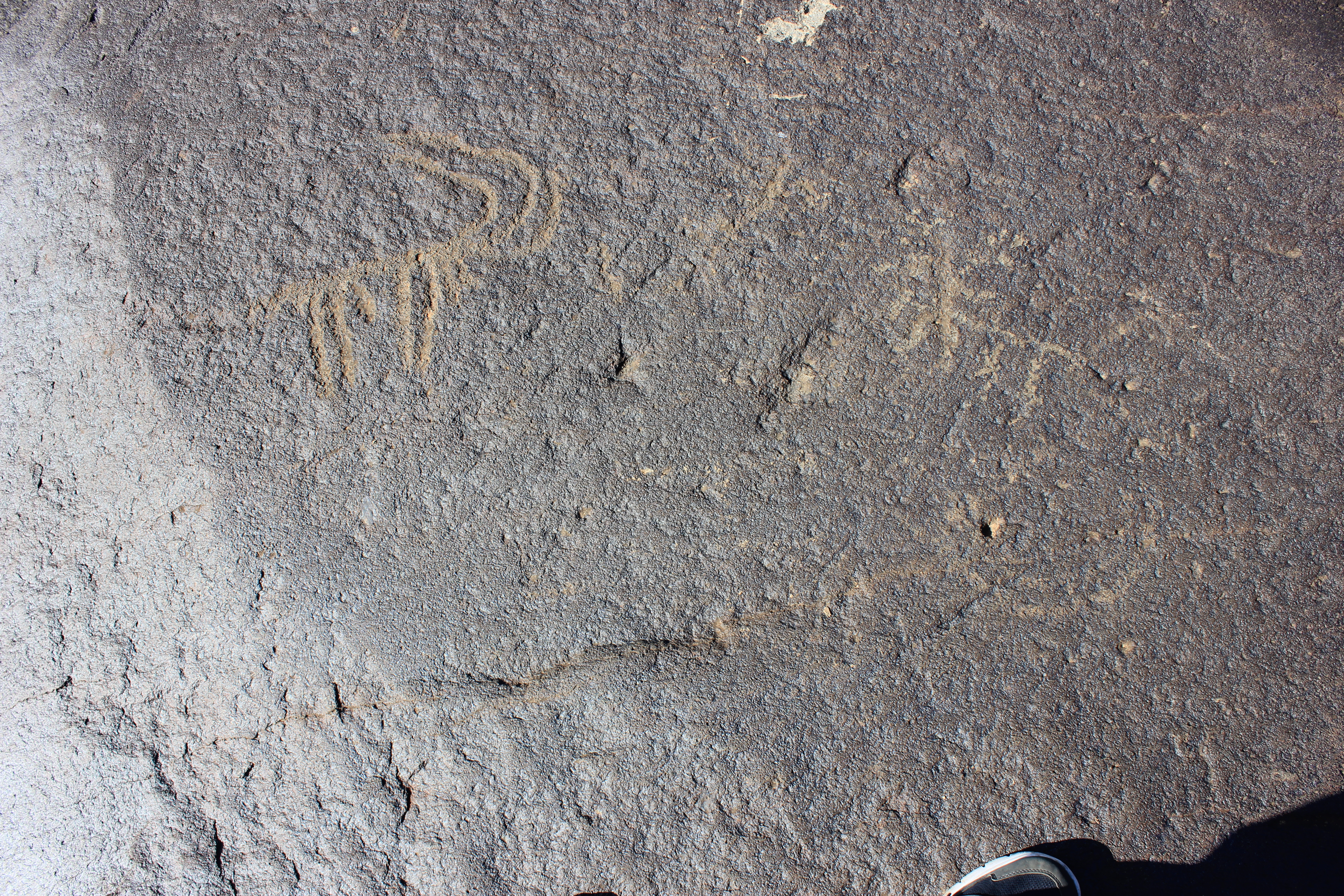

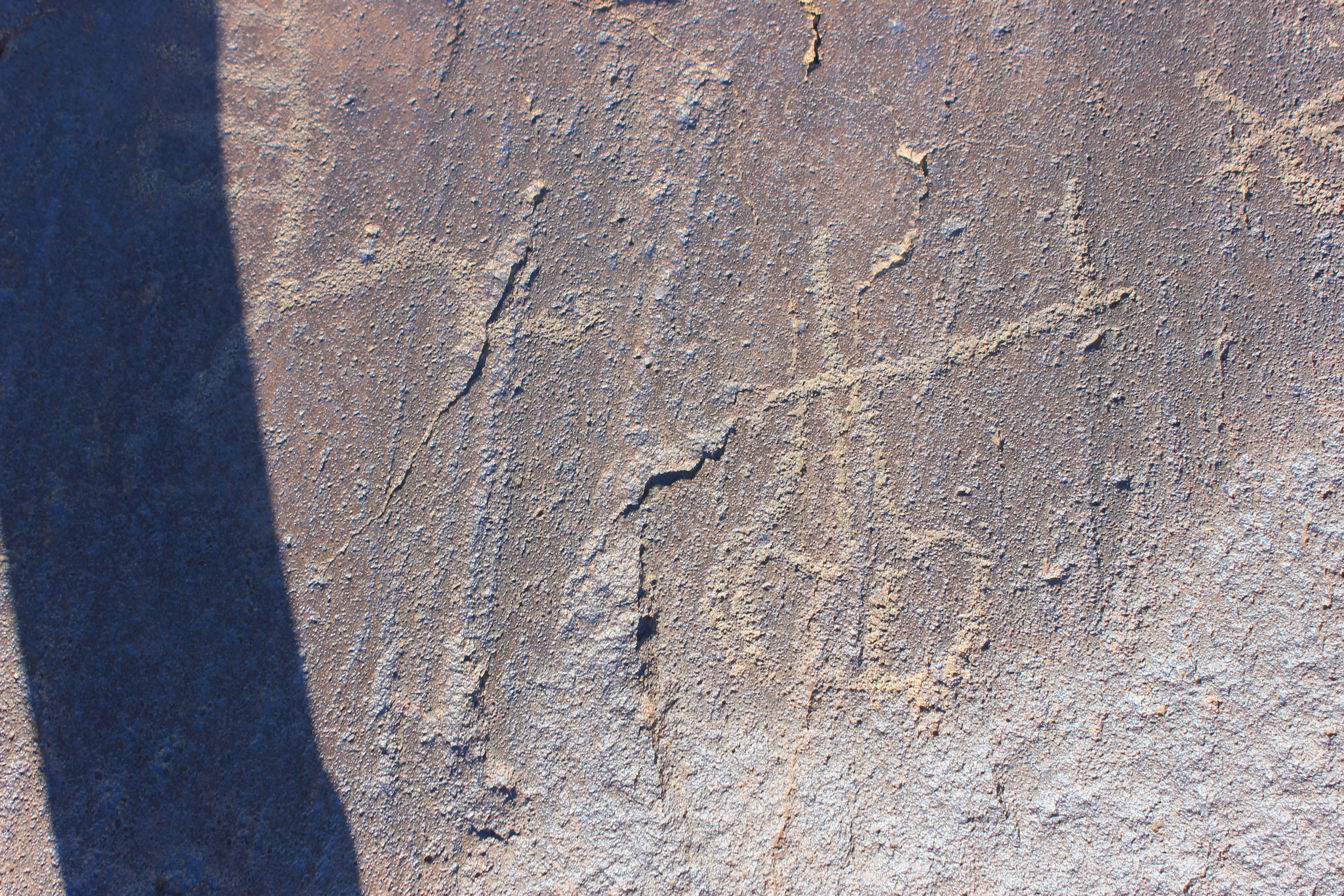

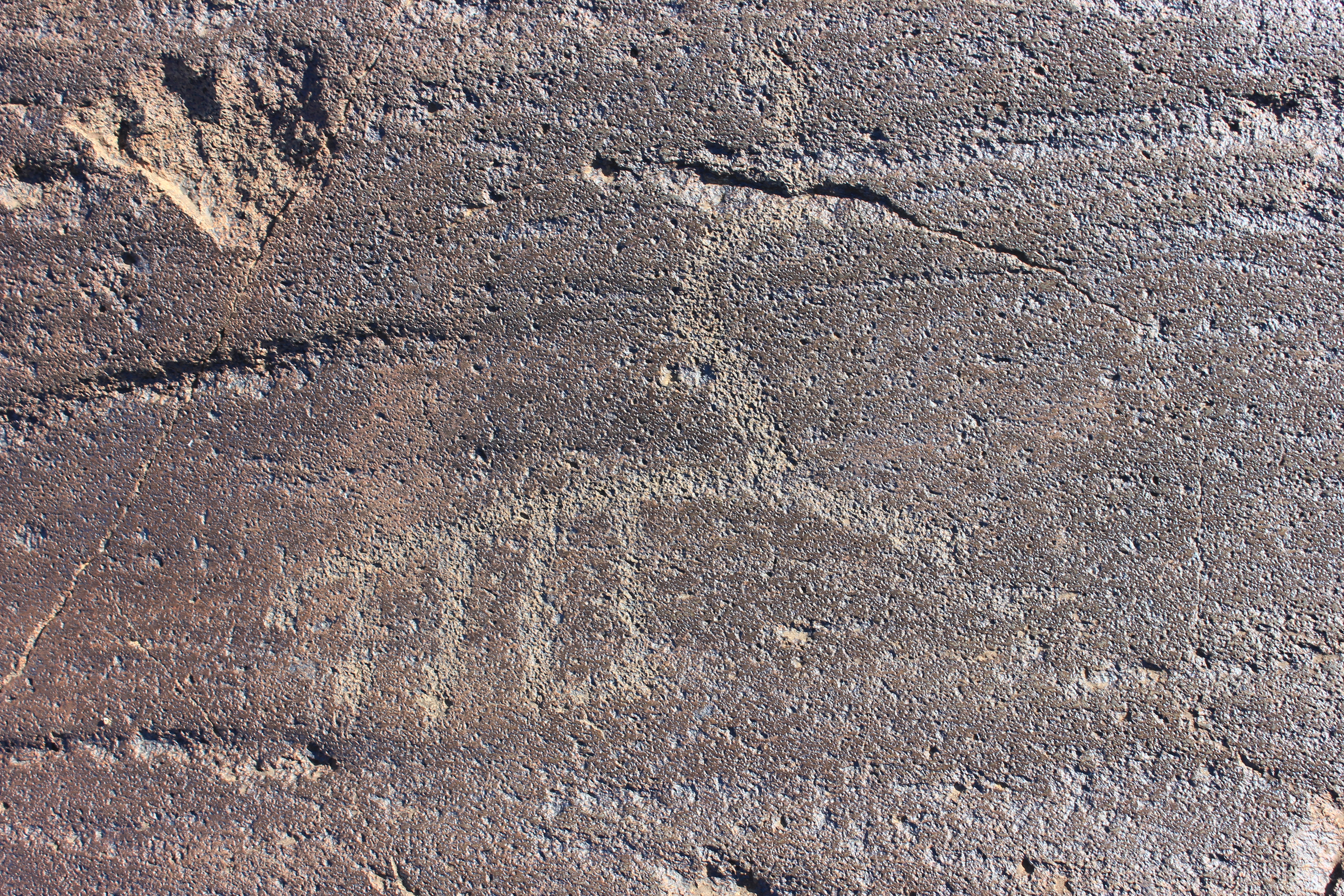

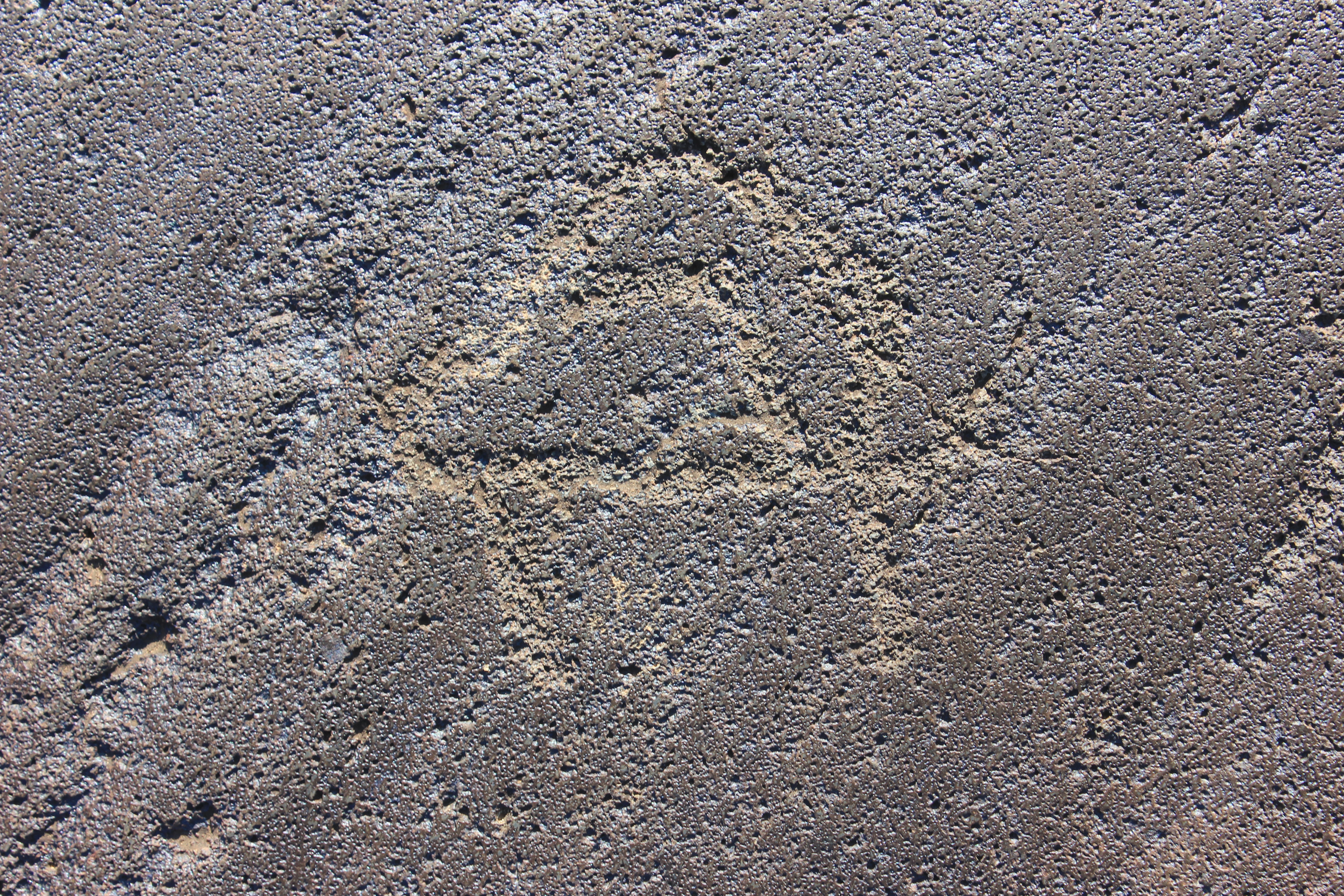

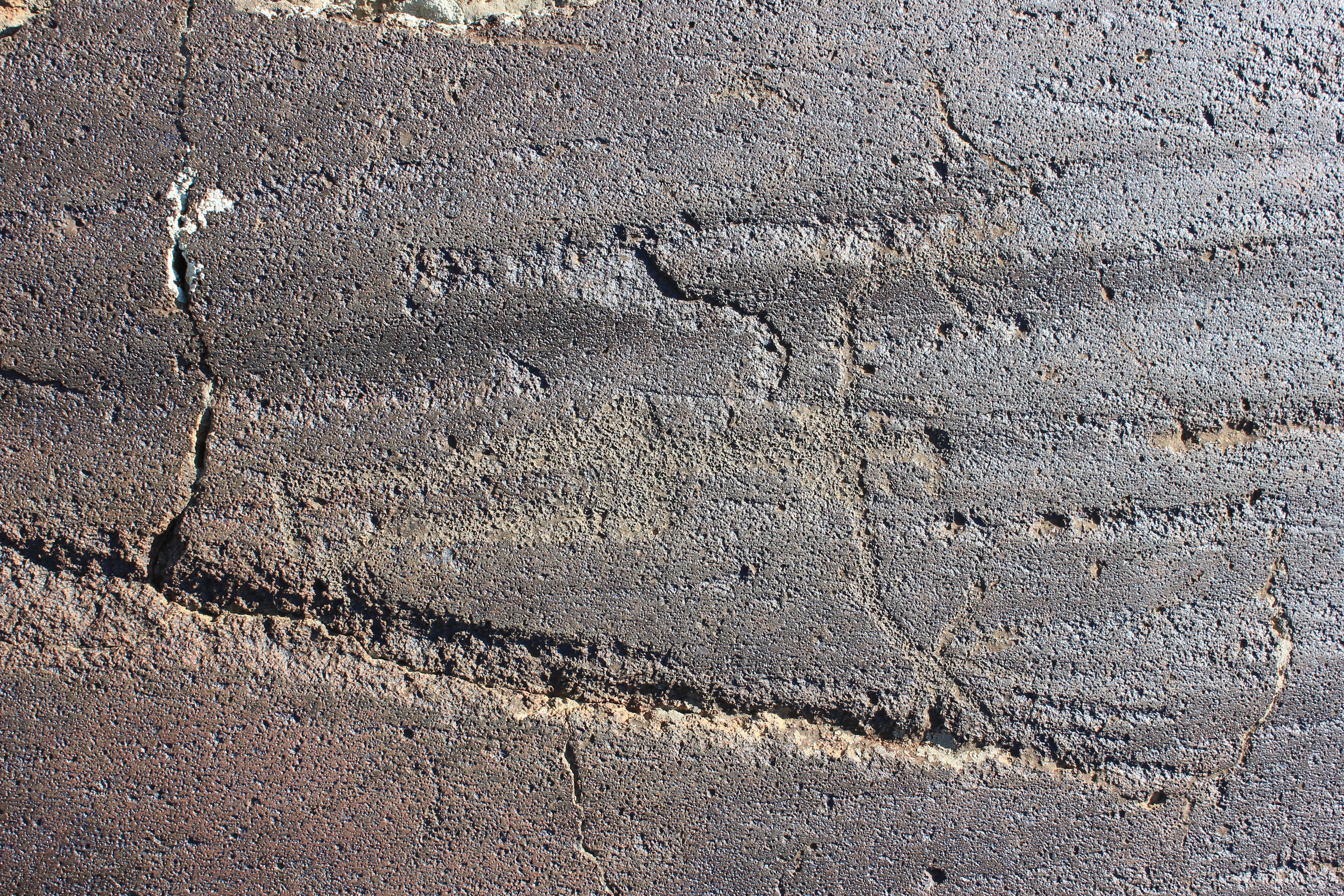

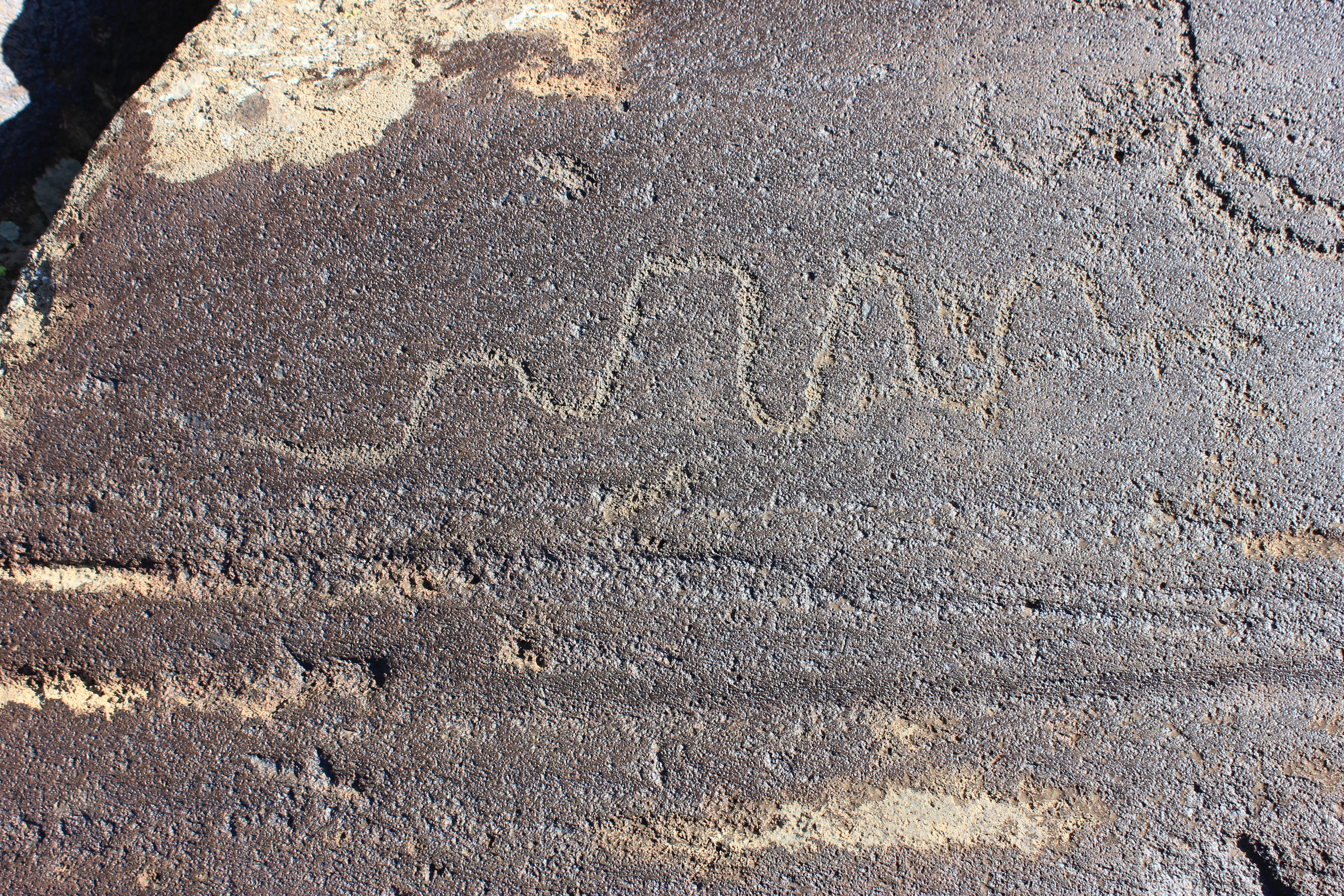

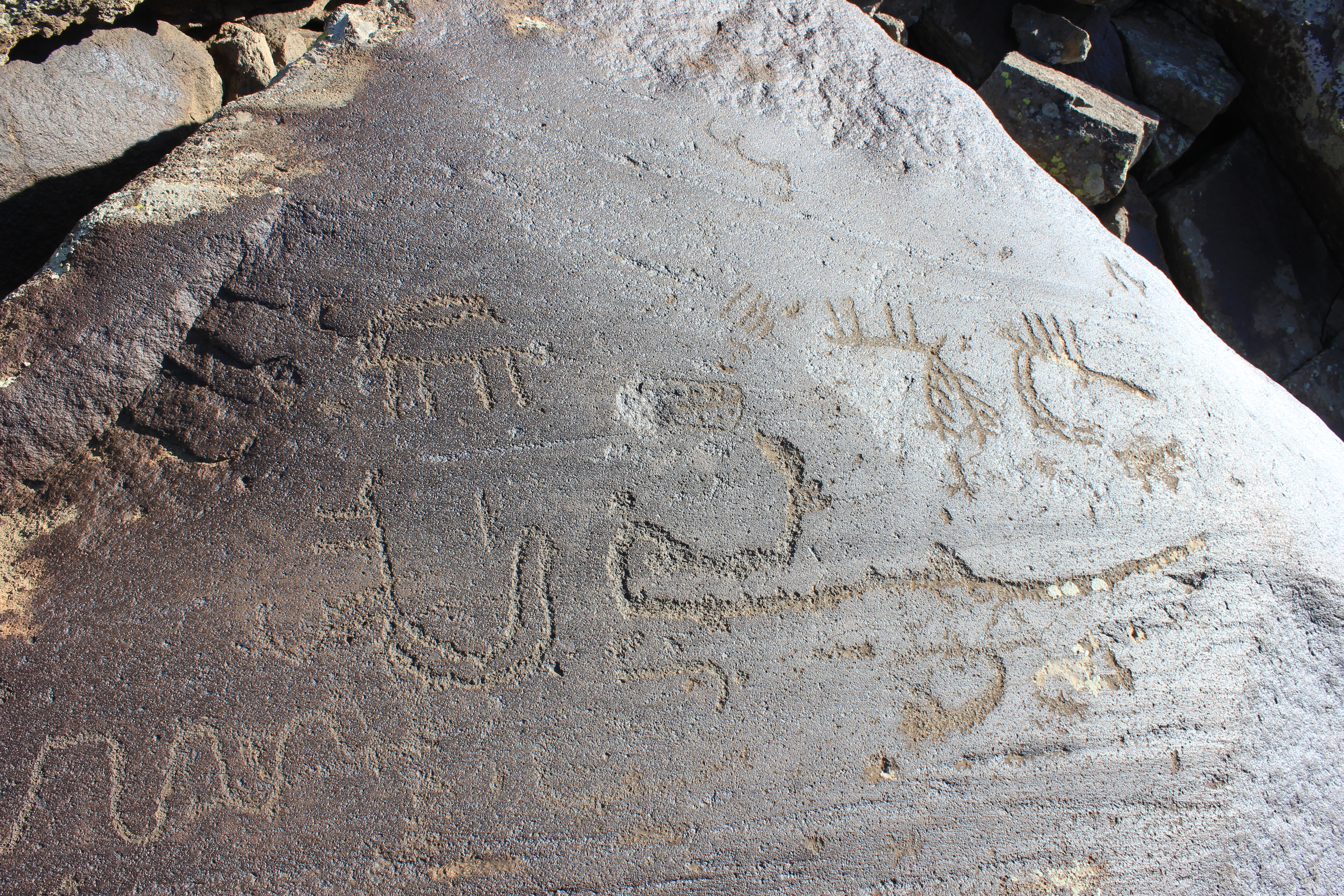

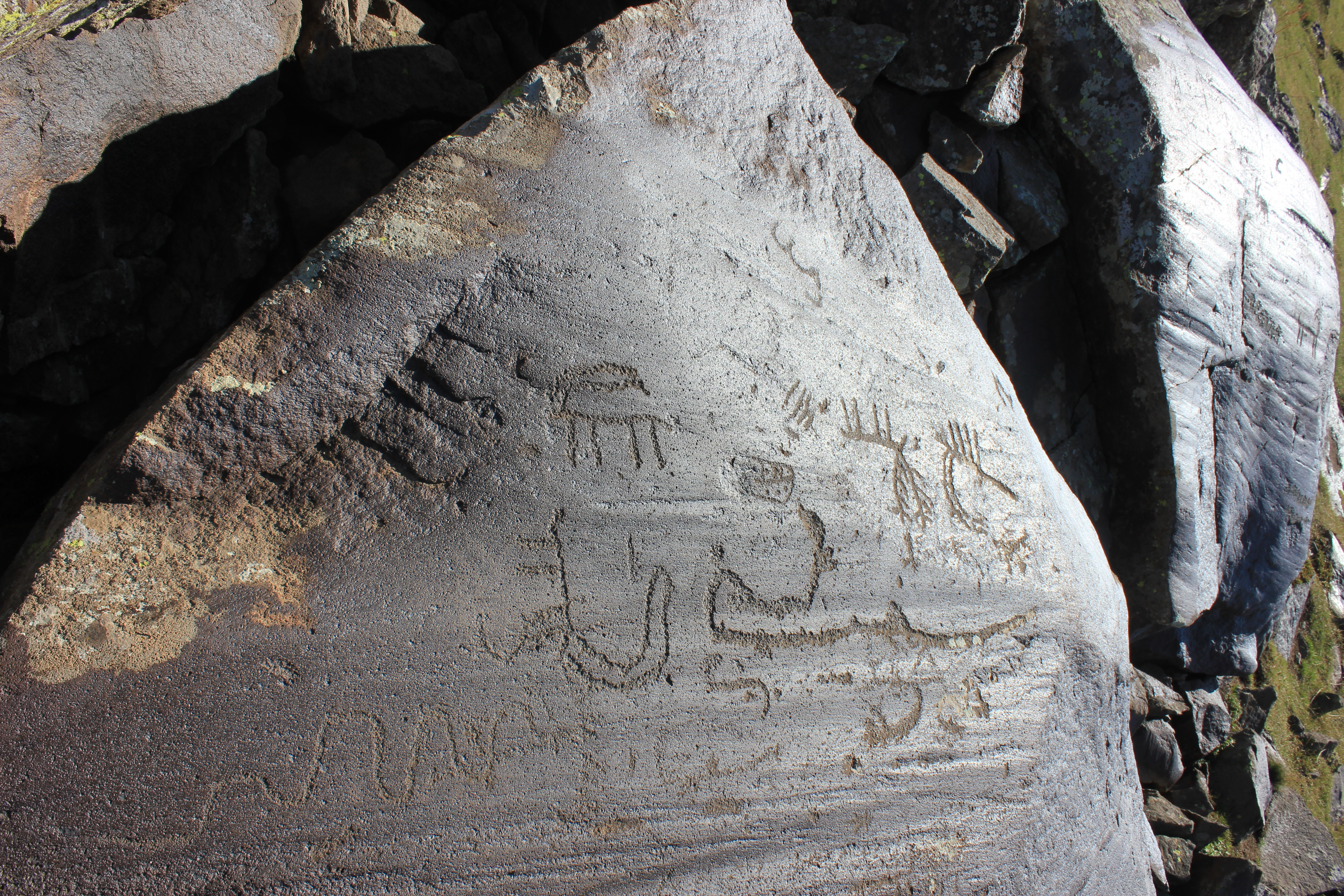

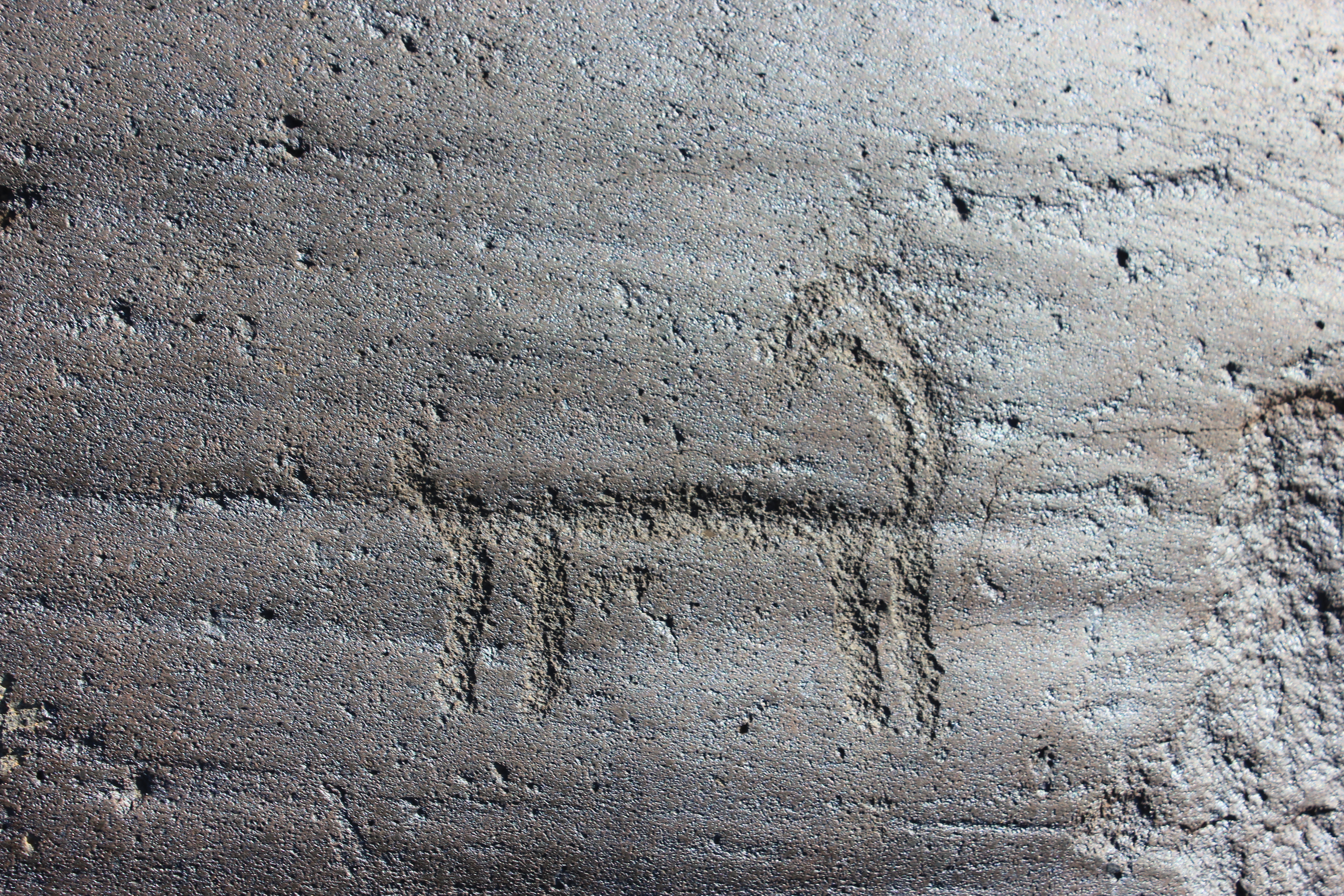

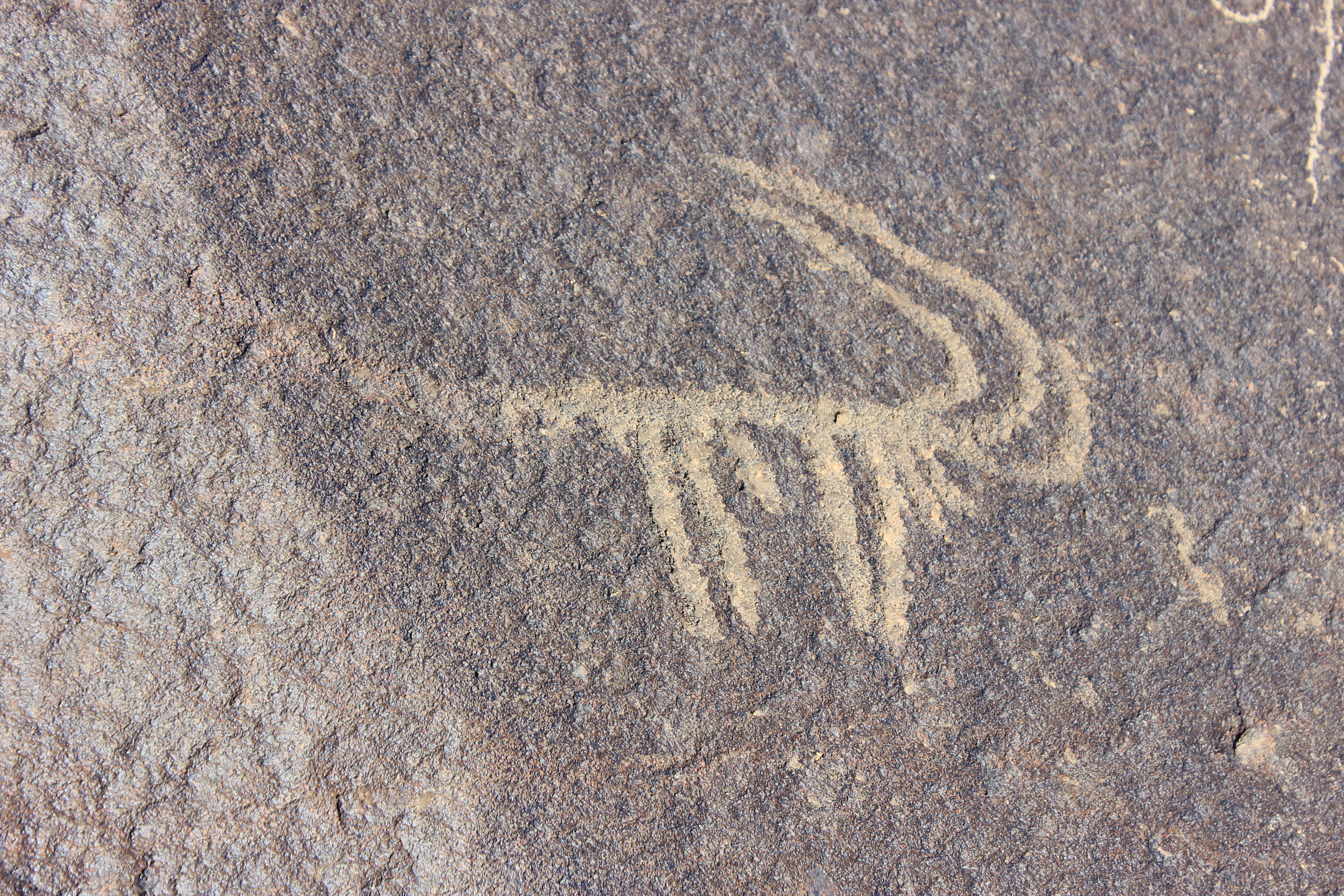

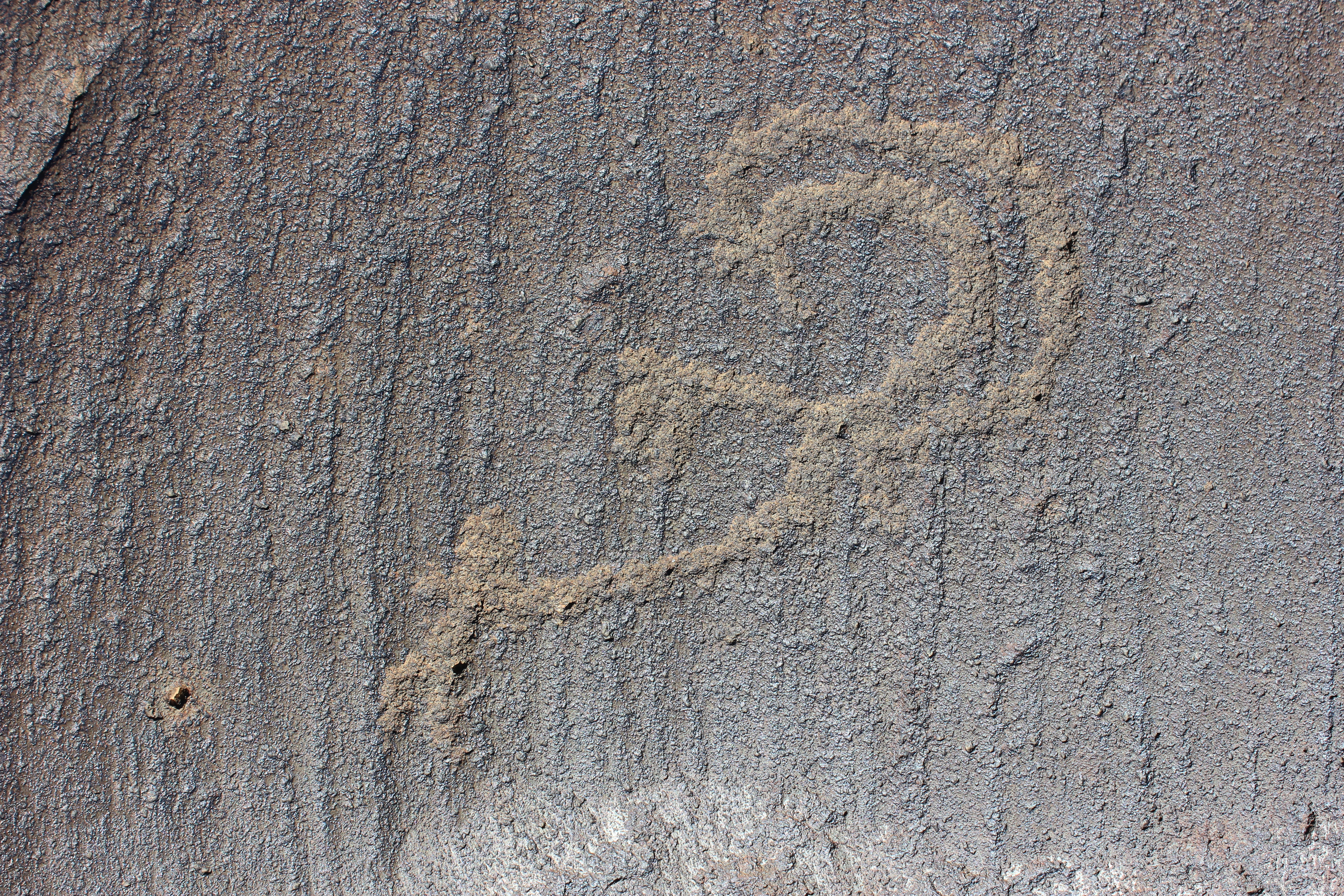

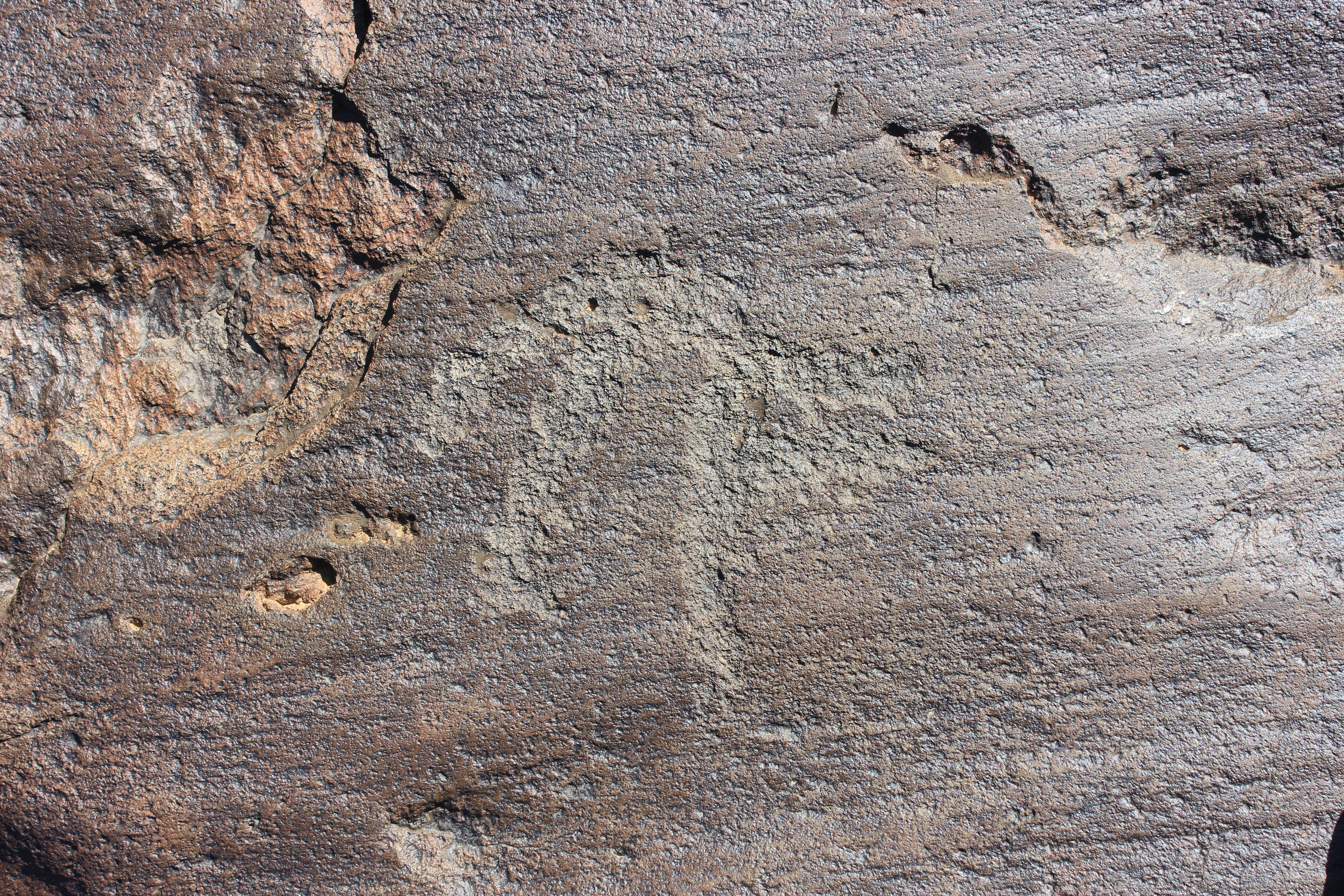

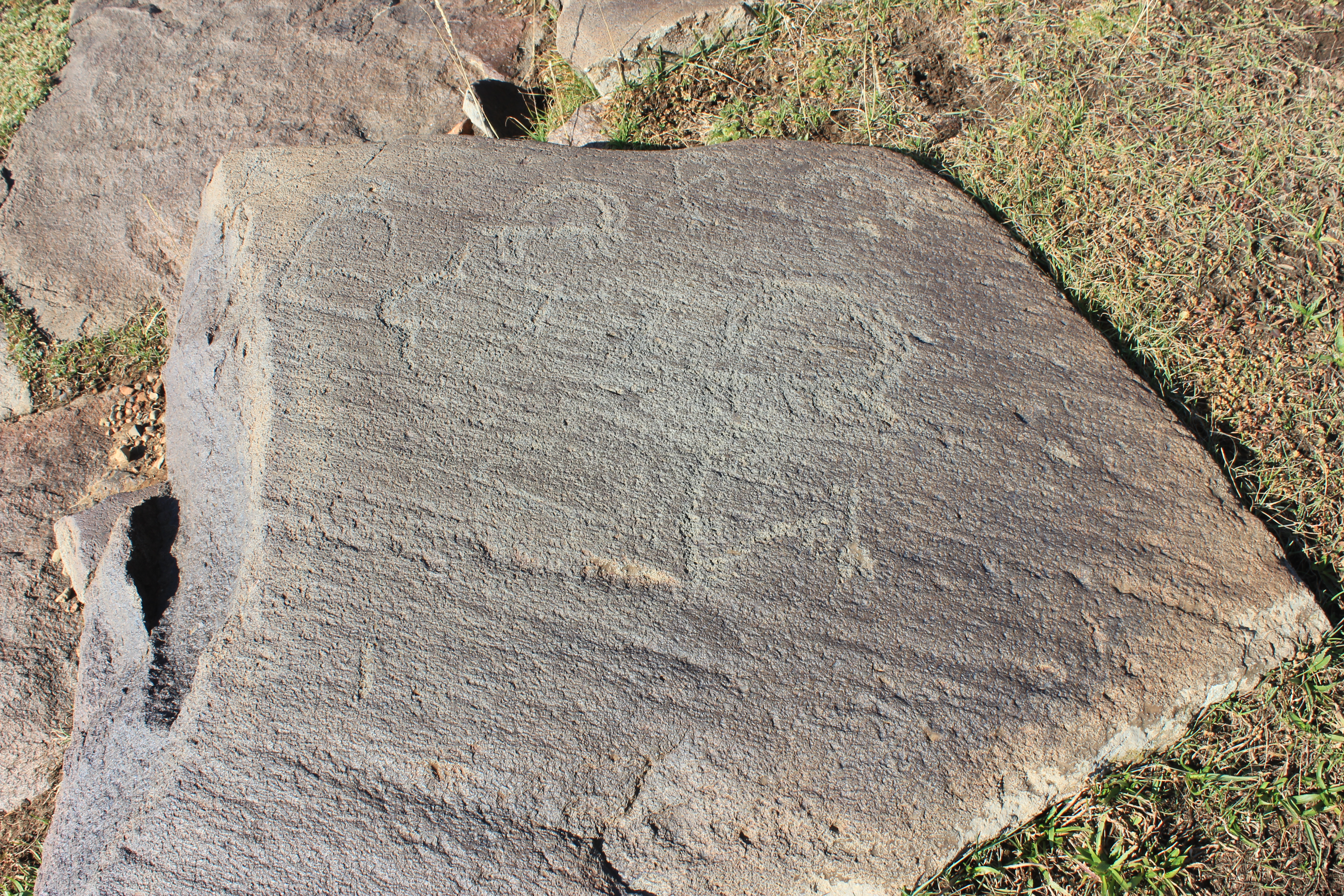

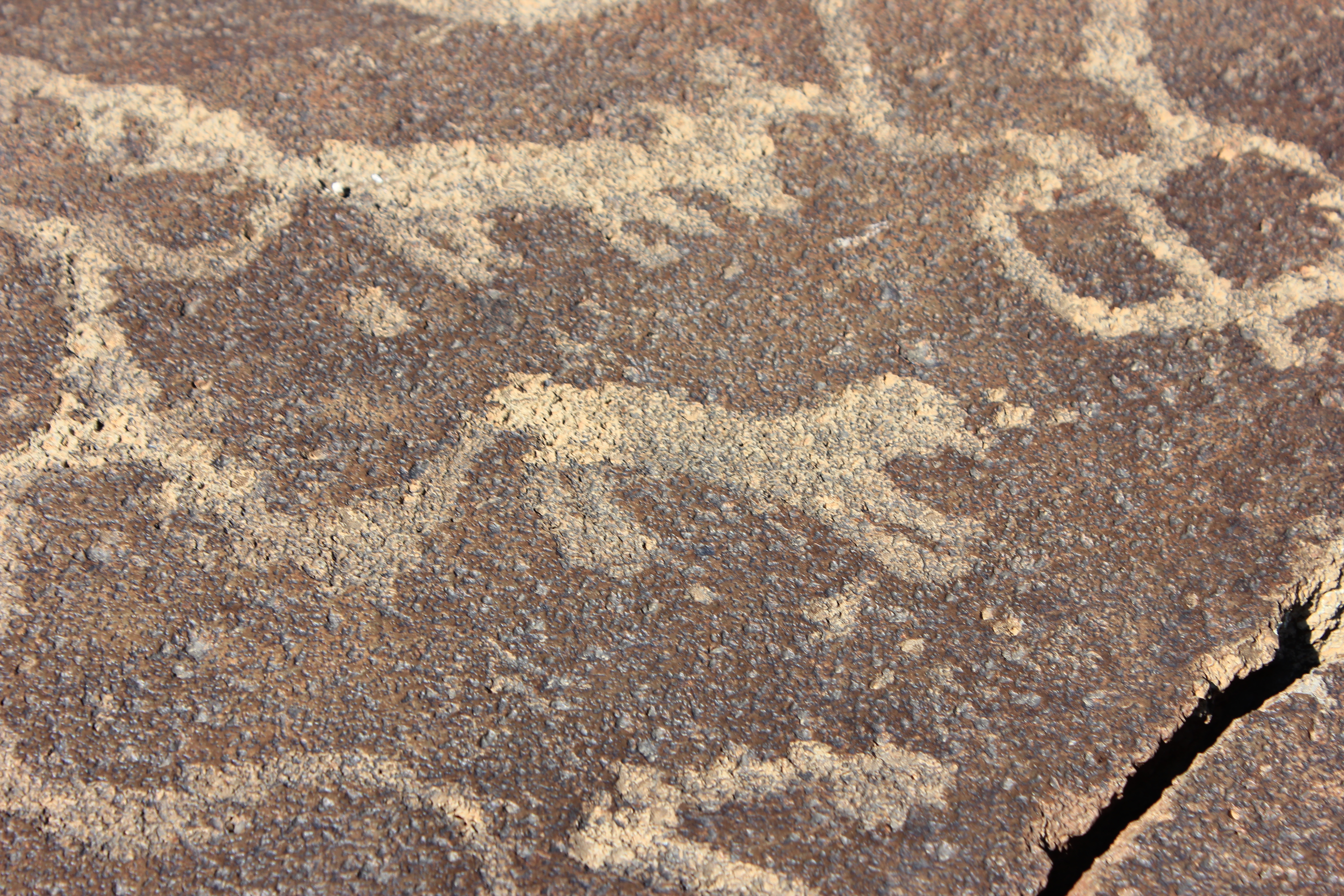

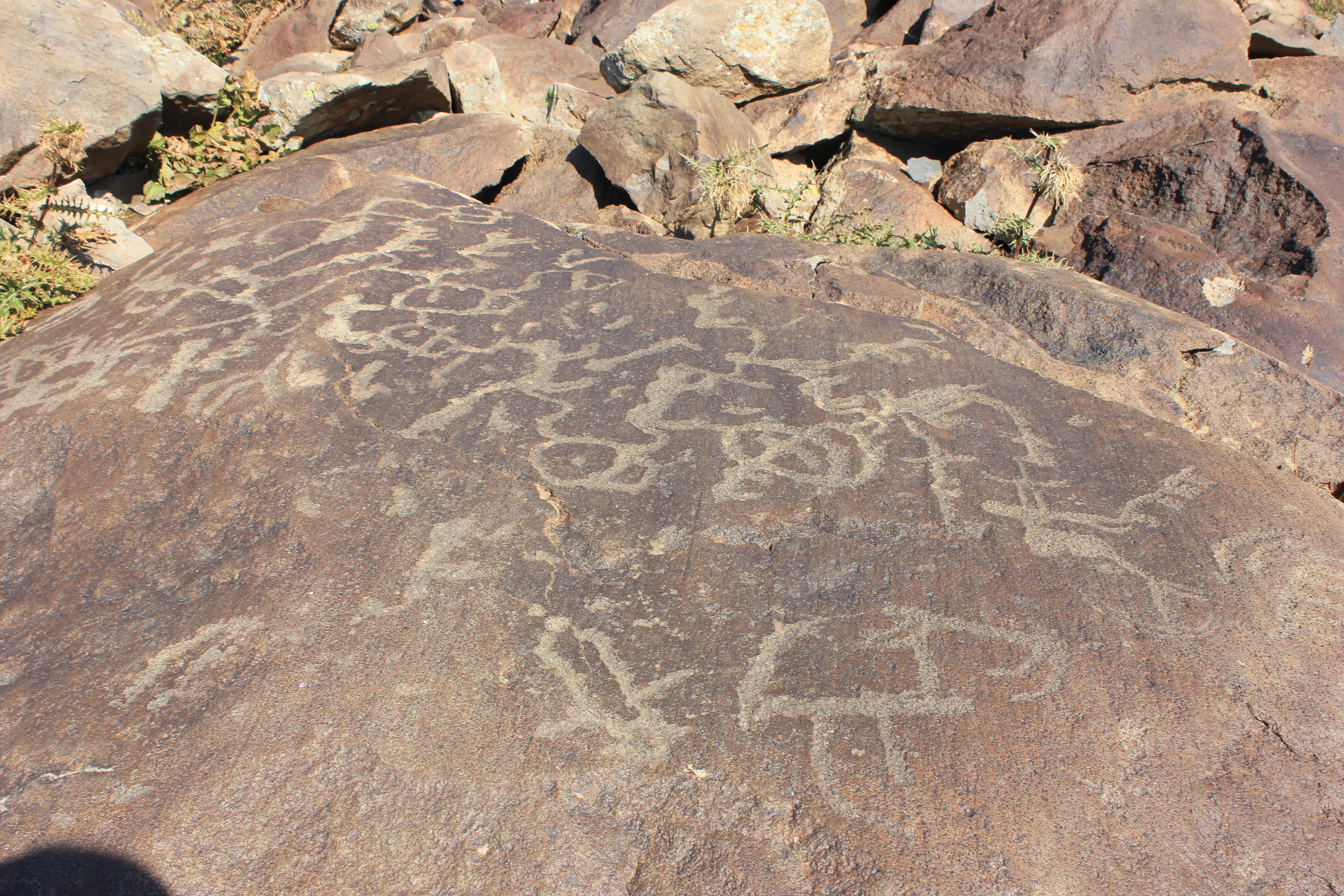

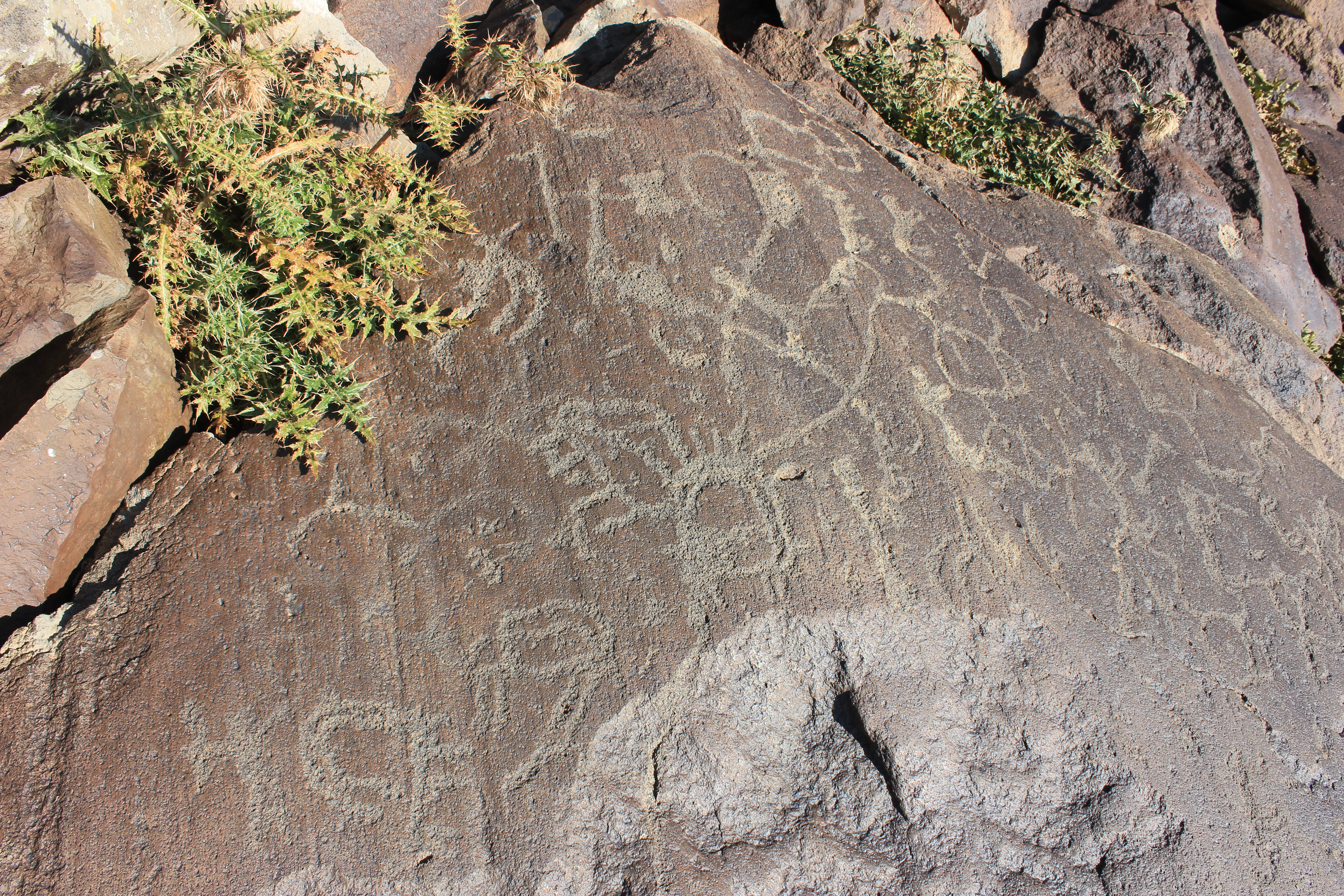

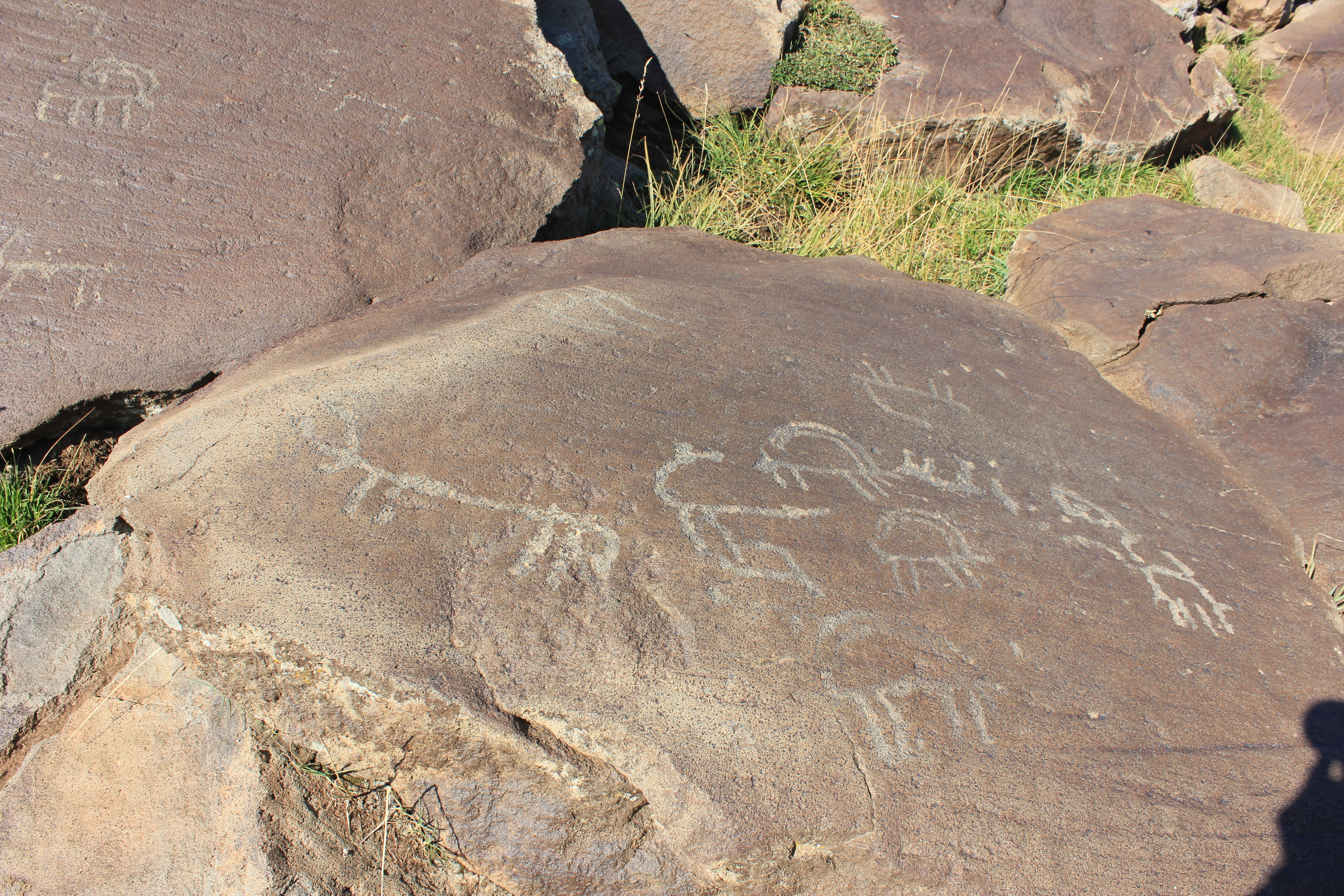

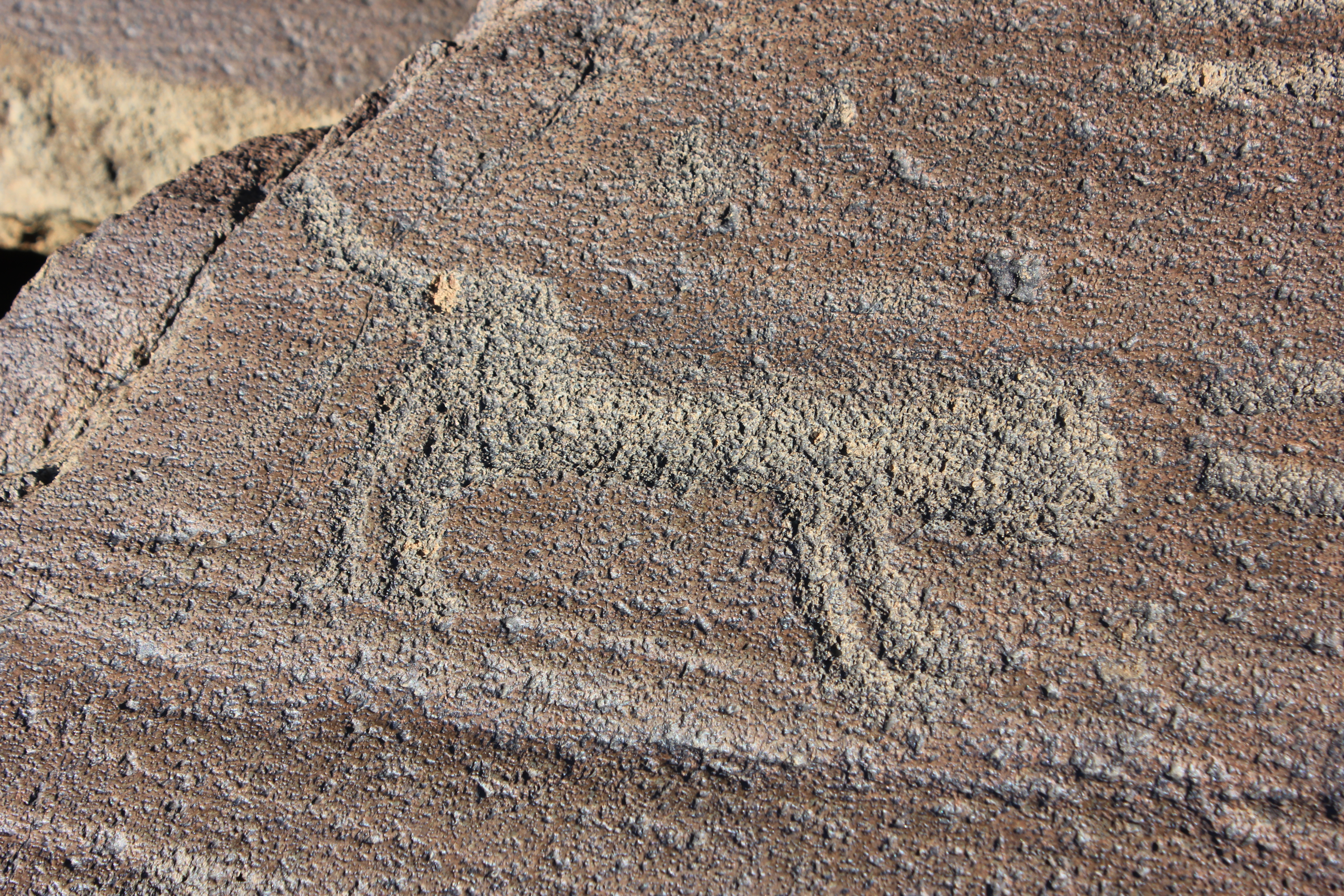

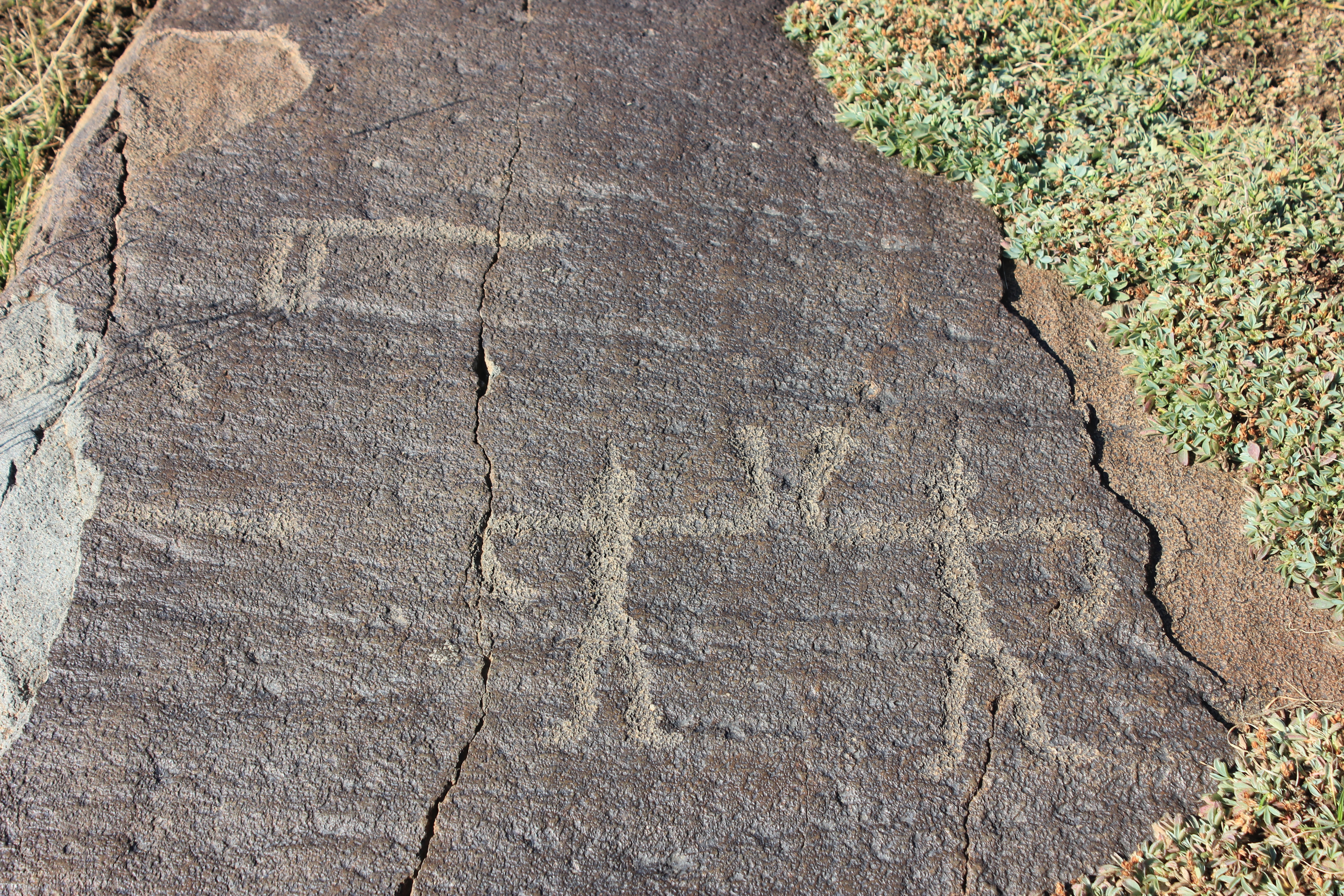

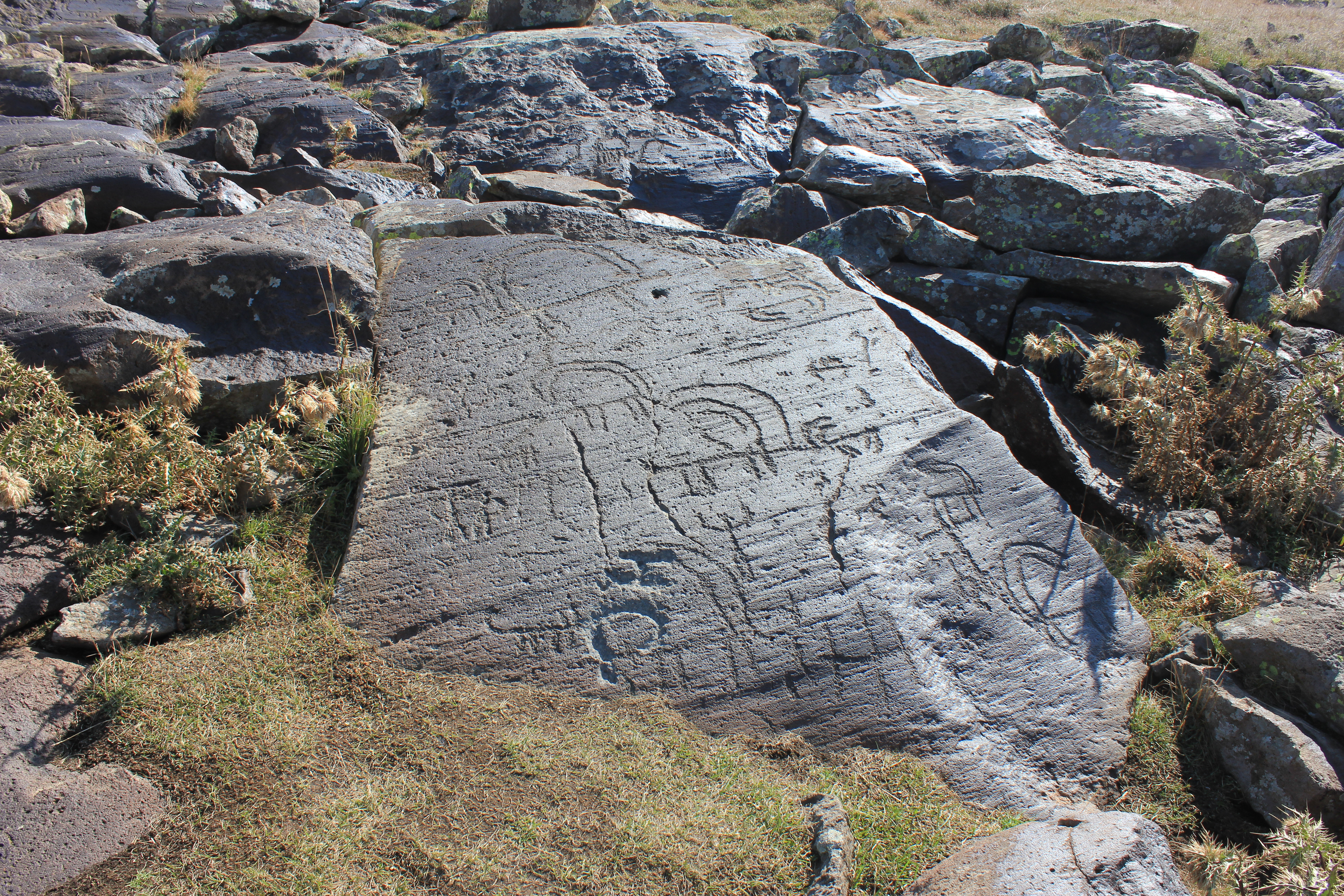

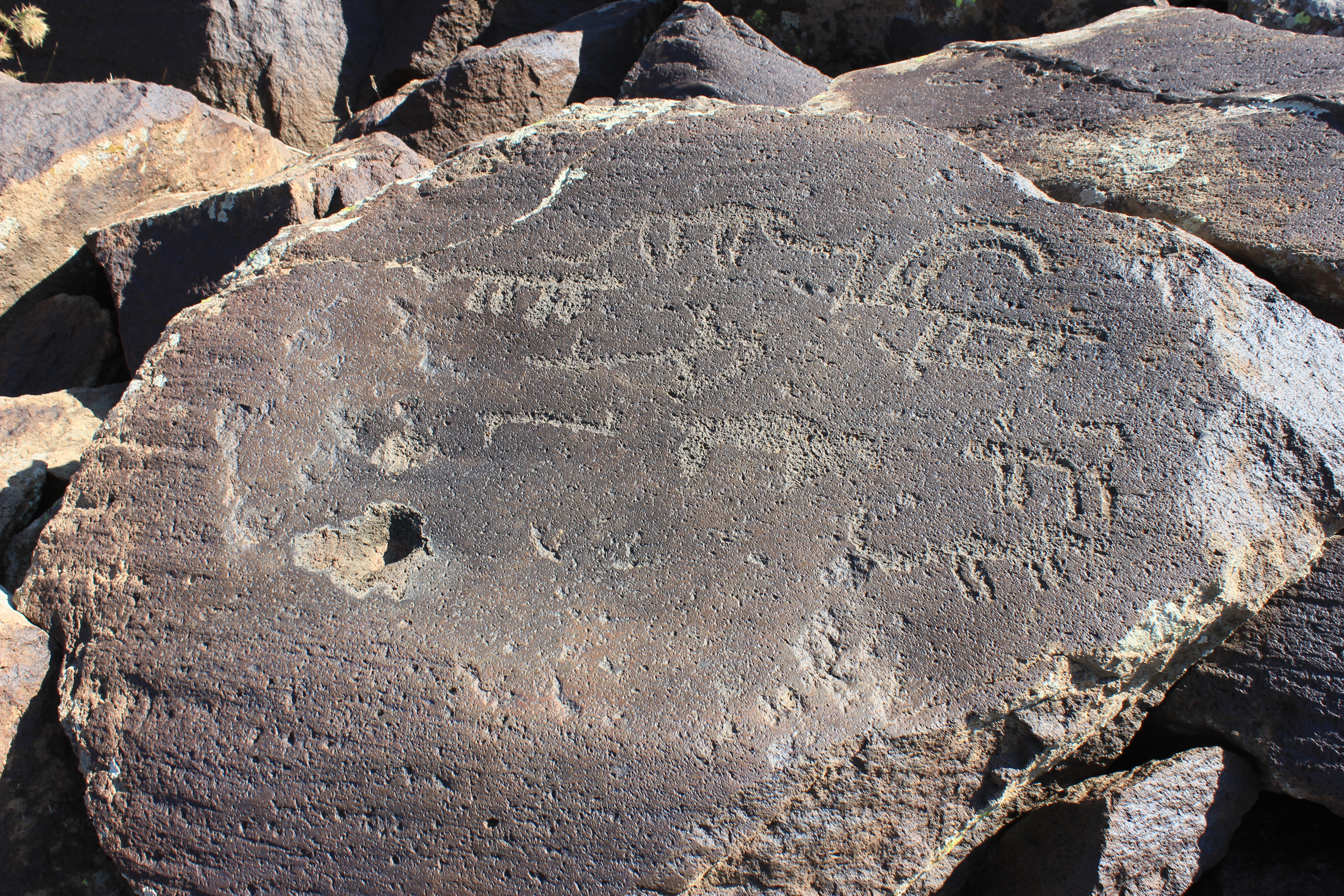

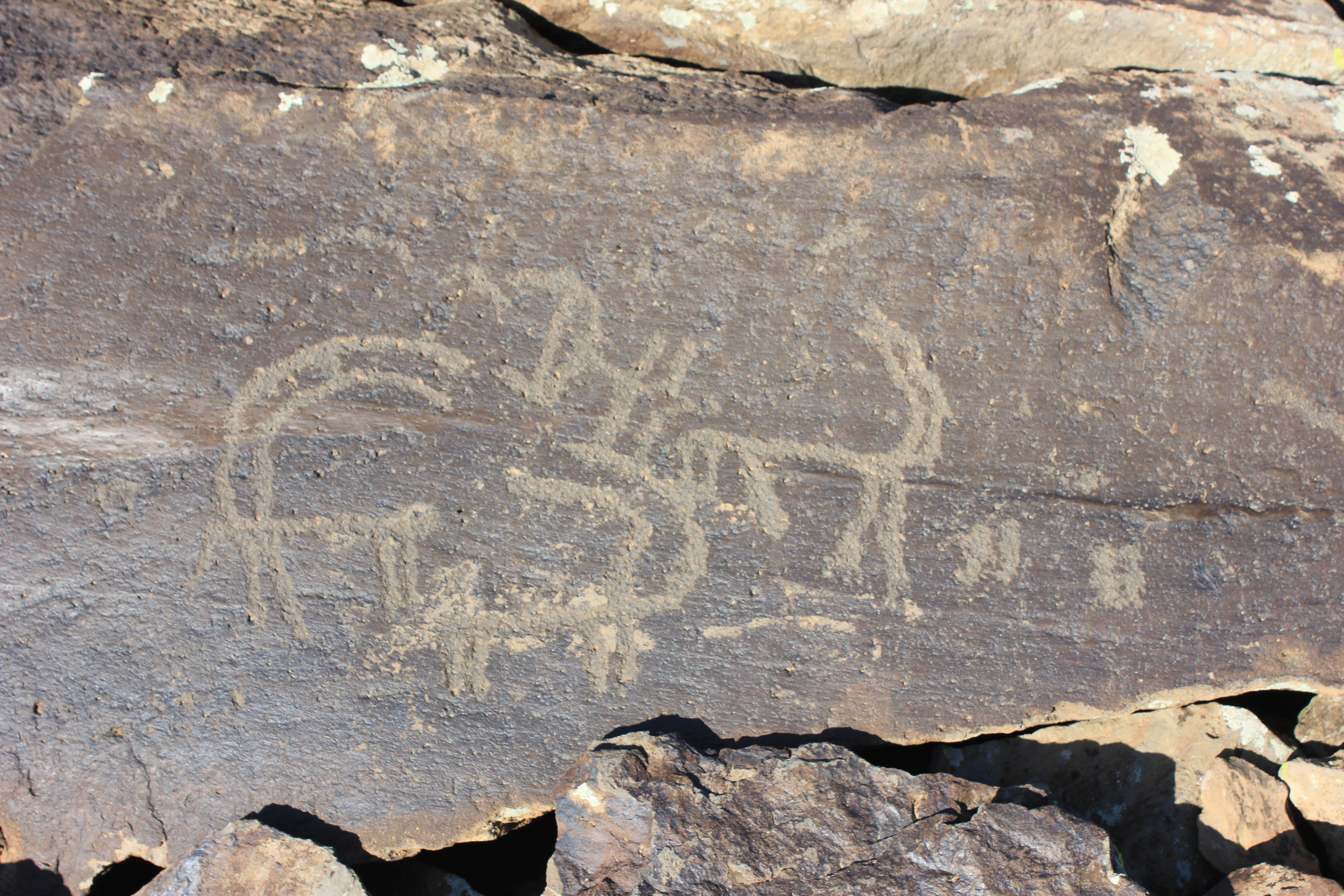

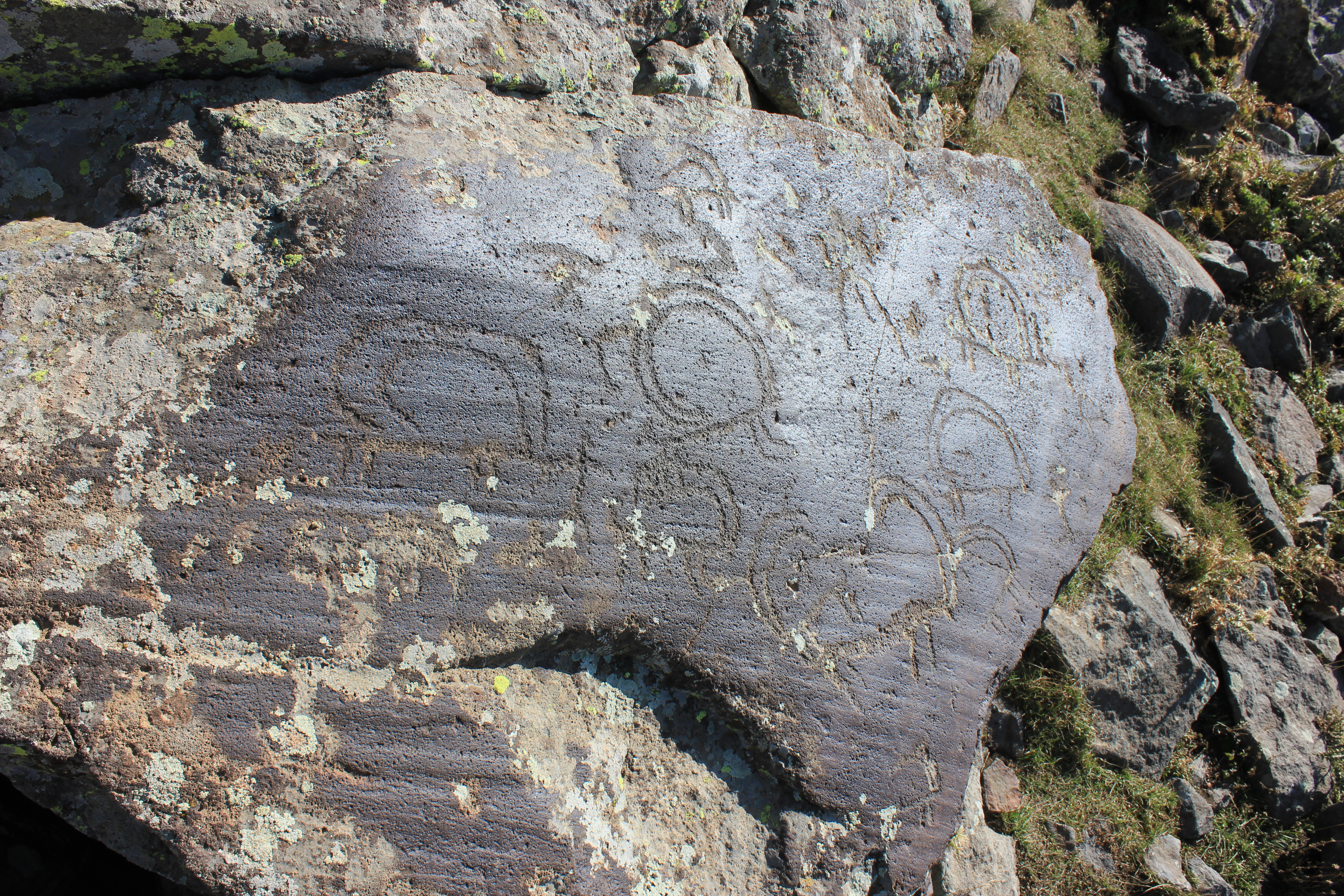

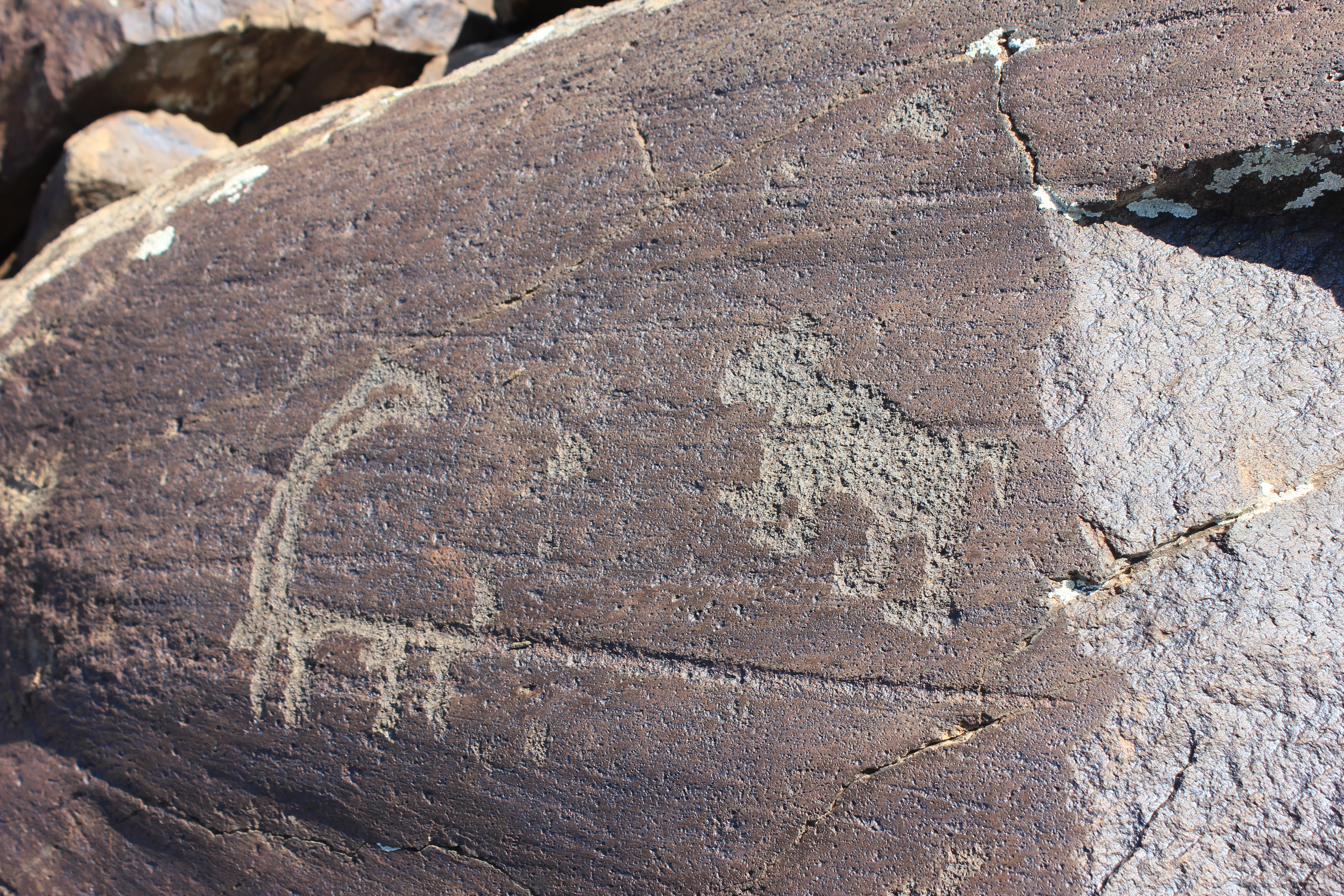

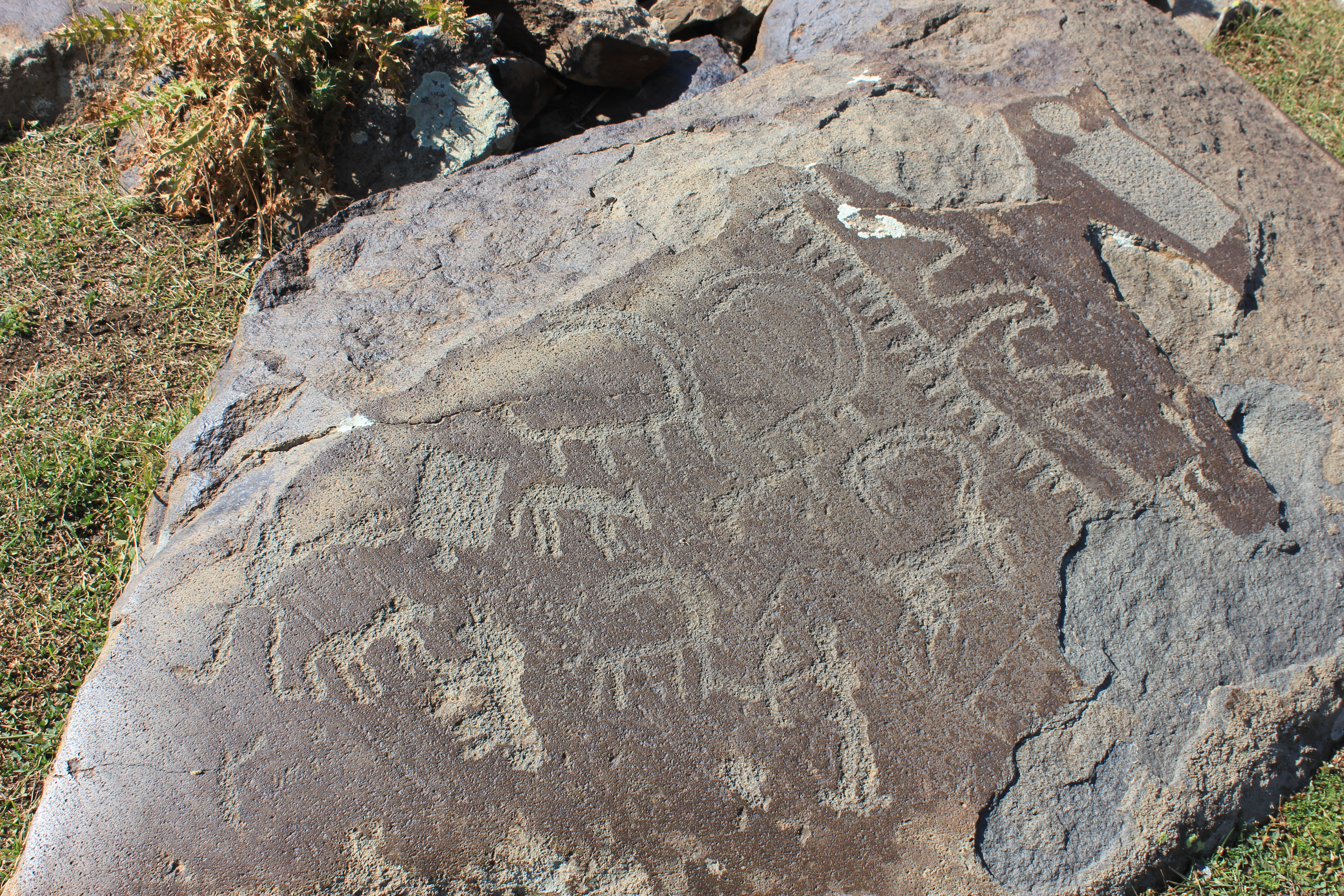

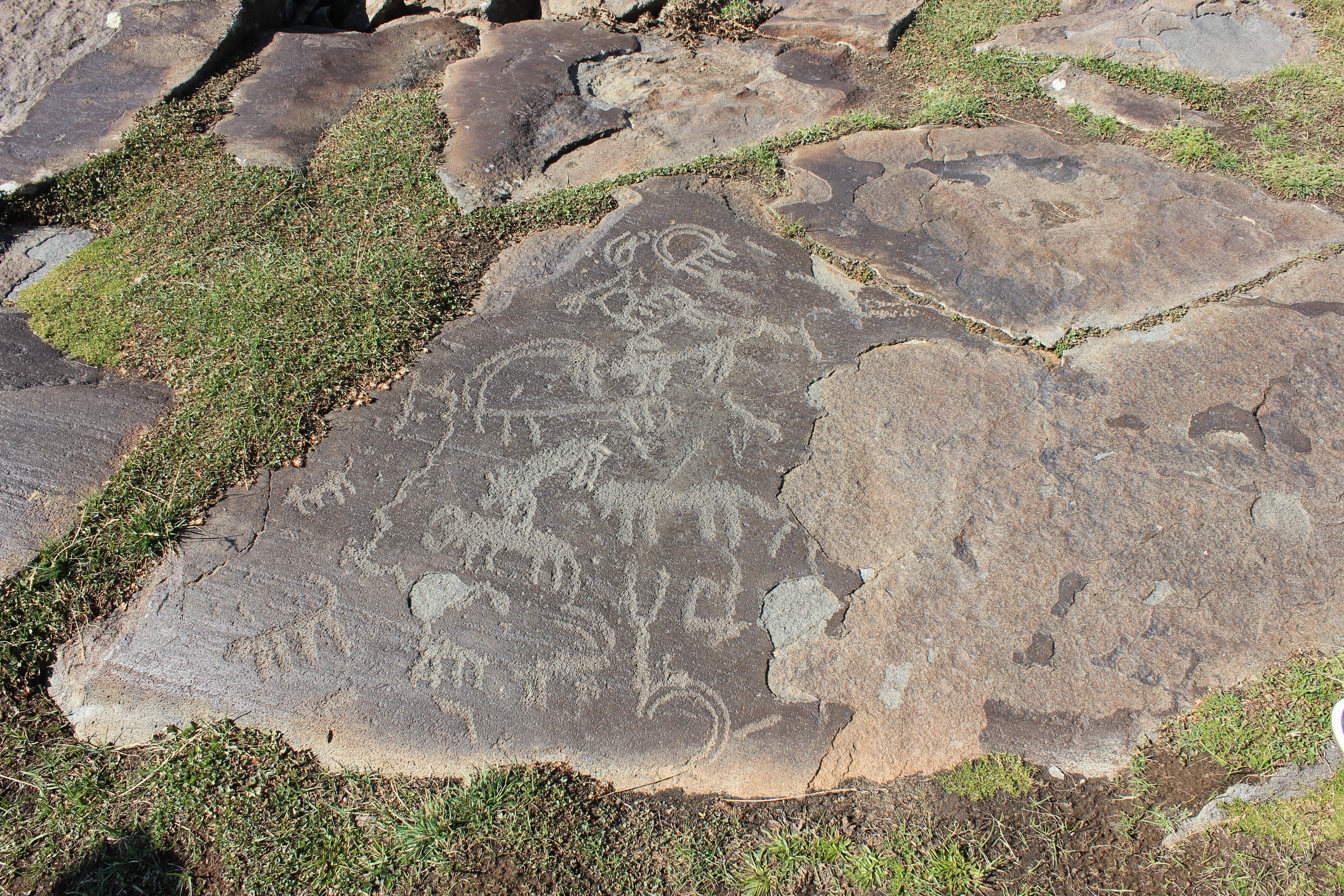

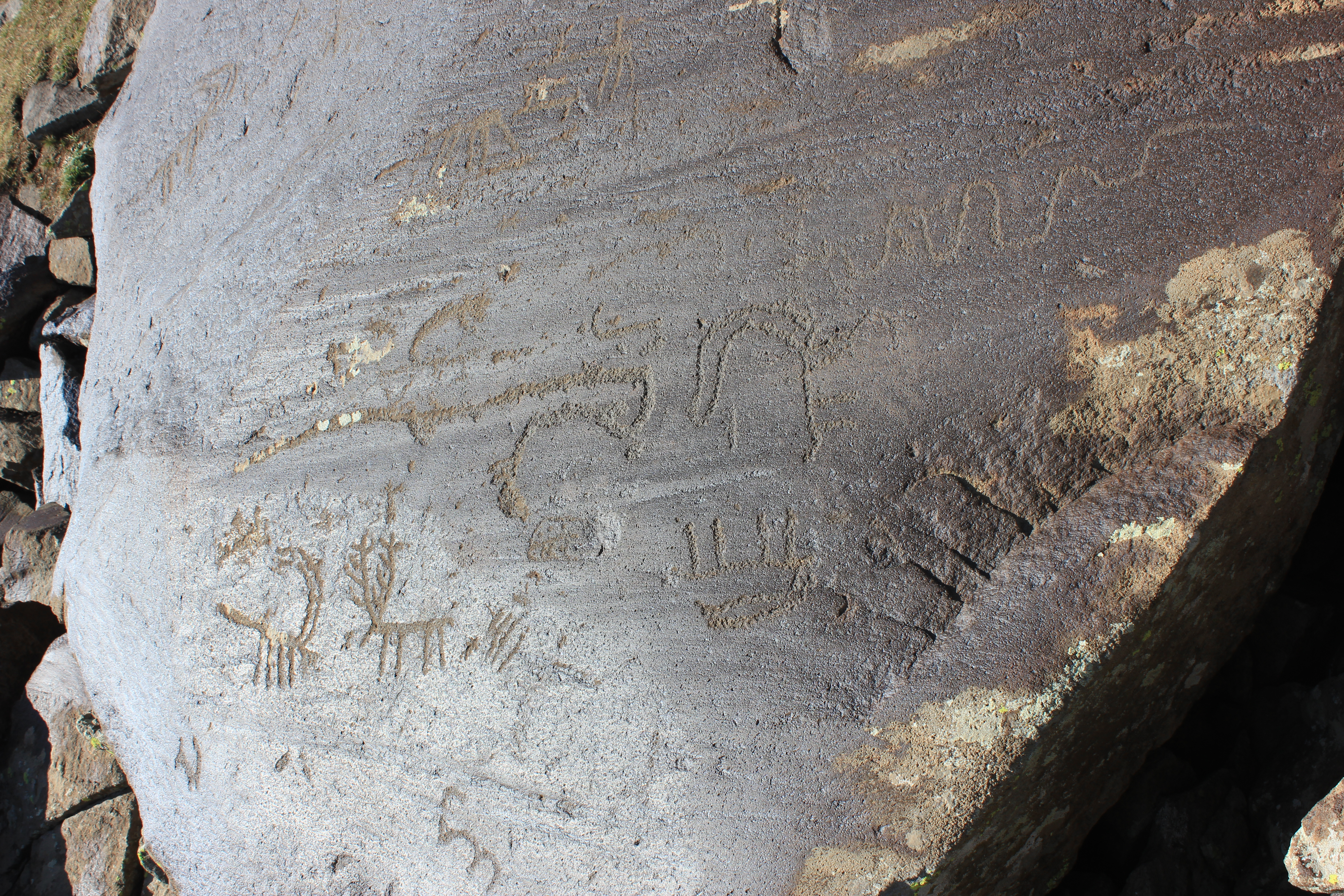

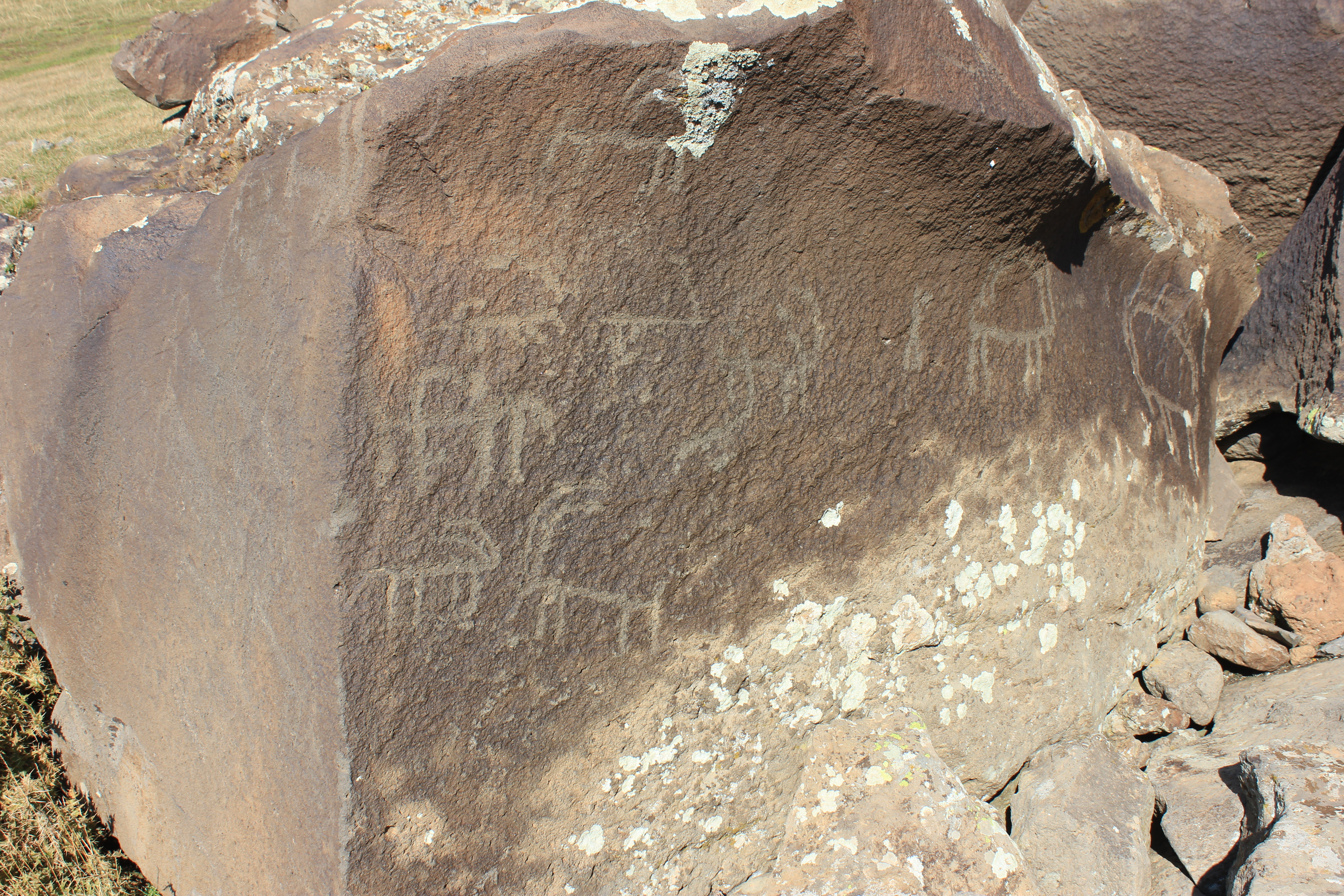

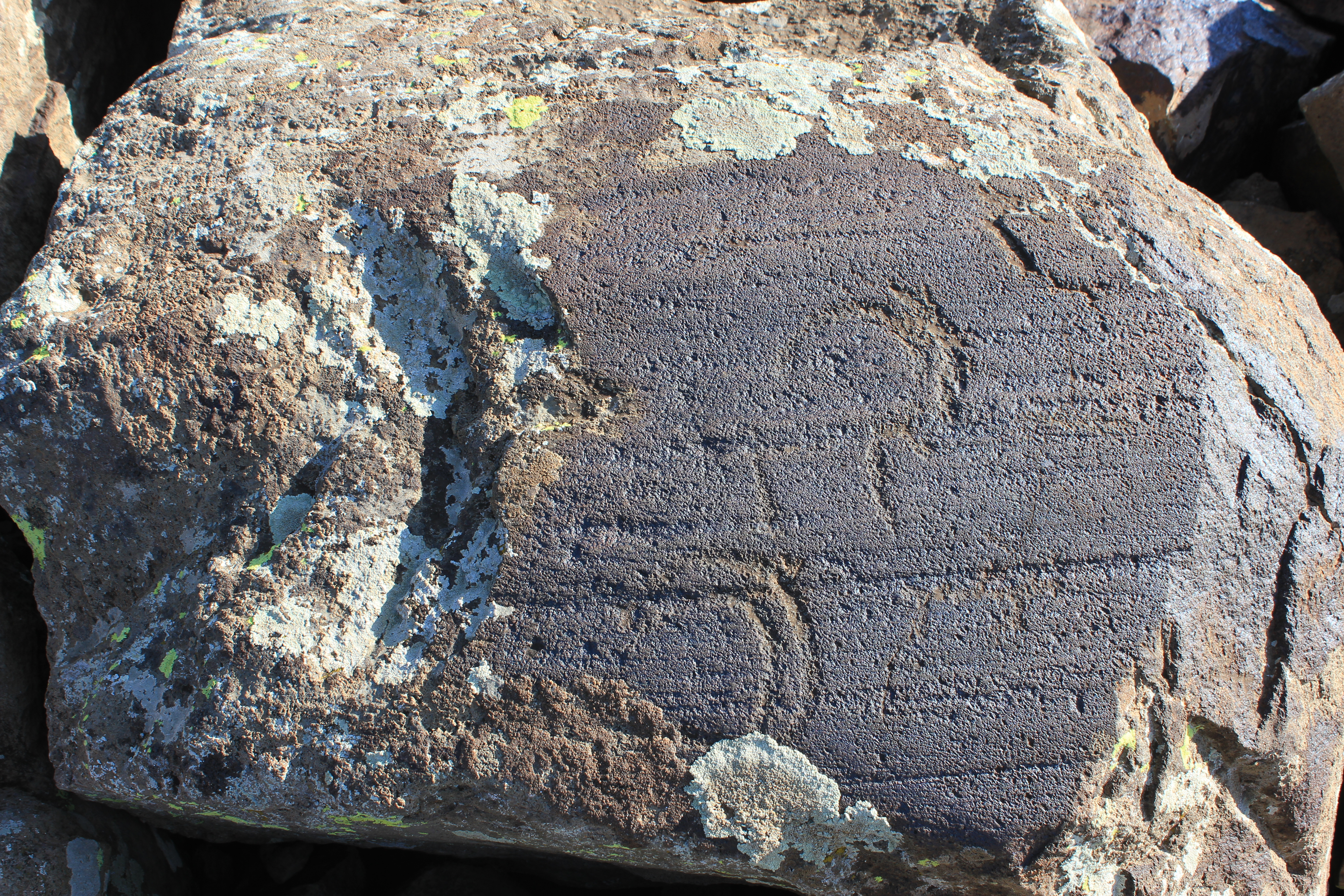

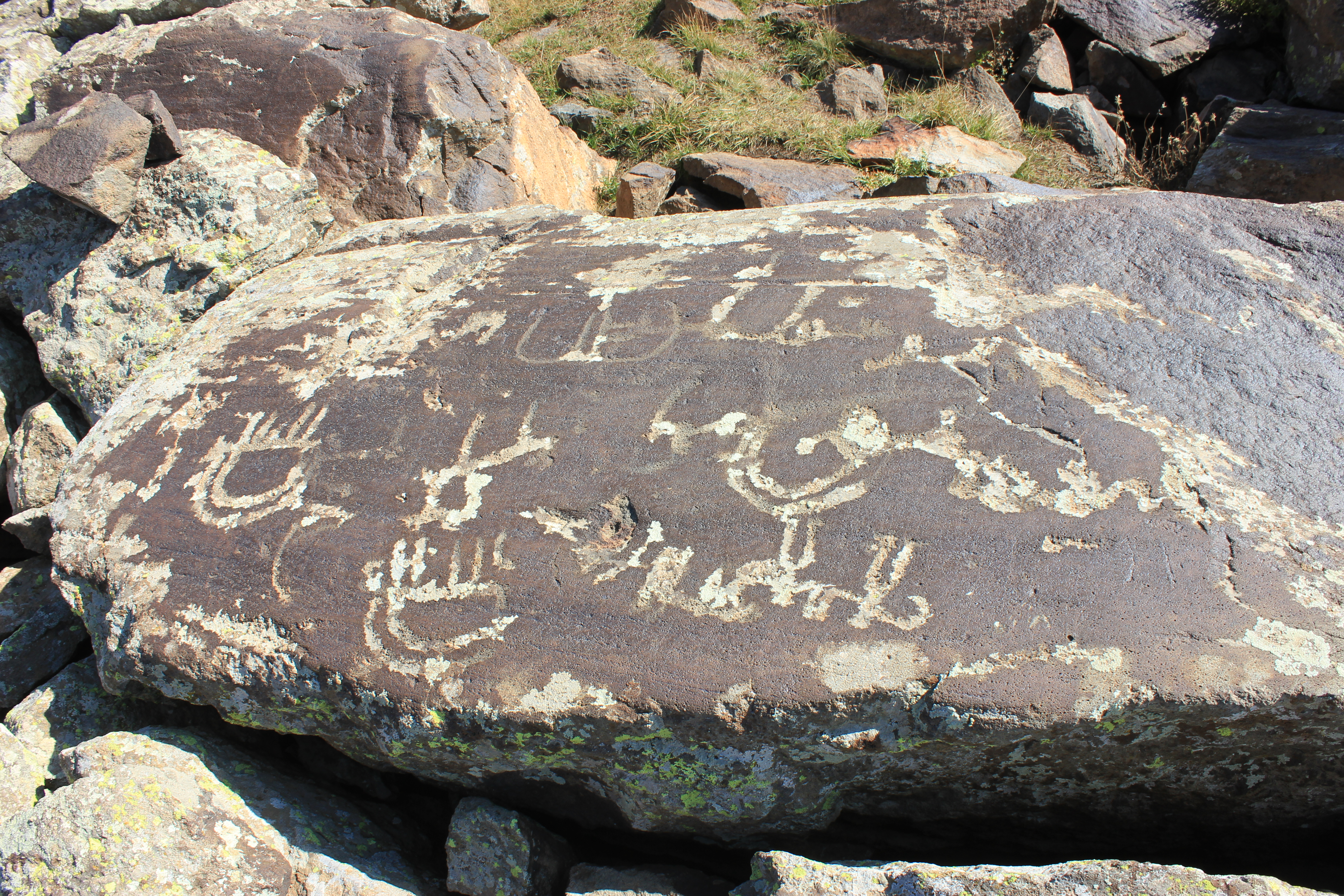

== See also ==
- Armenian Gampr dog
- History of Armenia
- Karahunj or Zorats Karer, a nearby prehistoric site also known as the "Armenian Stonehenge"
