= List of Important Bird Areas in Armenia =

There are 18 Important Bird and Biodiversity Areas (IBAs) designated for Armenia. The following is a list of Important Bird Areas in the country:

== Armenia ==
| Site Code | Name | IBA Criteria |
| AM001 | Lake Arpi | A4i, B1i |
| AM002 | Pombak mountains | A1, B2 |
| AM003 | Khosrov Reserve | A1, A3, B2 |
| AM004 | Armash | A1, A4i, B1i, B2 |
| AM005 | Lake Sevan | A1, A4i, B1i |
| AM006 | Amasia | A1, A4i, B1i, B1iv, B2 |
| AM007 | Tashir | A1, B1iv, B2 |
| AM008 | Dsegh | A1, A2, B2 |
| AM009 | Haghartsin | A1, A2, A3, B2 |
| AM010 | Mount Ara | A1, A2, B2, B3 |
| AM011 | Sardarapat | A1, B1iv, B2 |
| AM012 | Metsamor | A1, B1iv, B2 |
| AM013 | Gndasar | B1iv, B2 |
| AM014 | Noravank | A1, B2 |
| AM015 | Jermook | A1, B2, B3 |
| AM016 | Gorayk | A1, B2 |
| AM017 | Zangezoor | A1, A2, A3, B2 |
| AM018 | Meghri | A1, A2, A3, B2, B3 |
