= Vorotan (river) =

River in Armenia and Azerbaijan

Vorotan Bargushad, Bazarchay
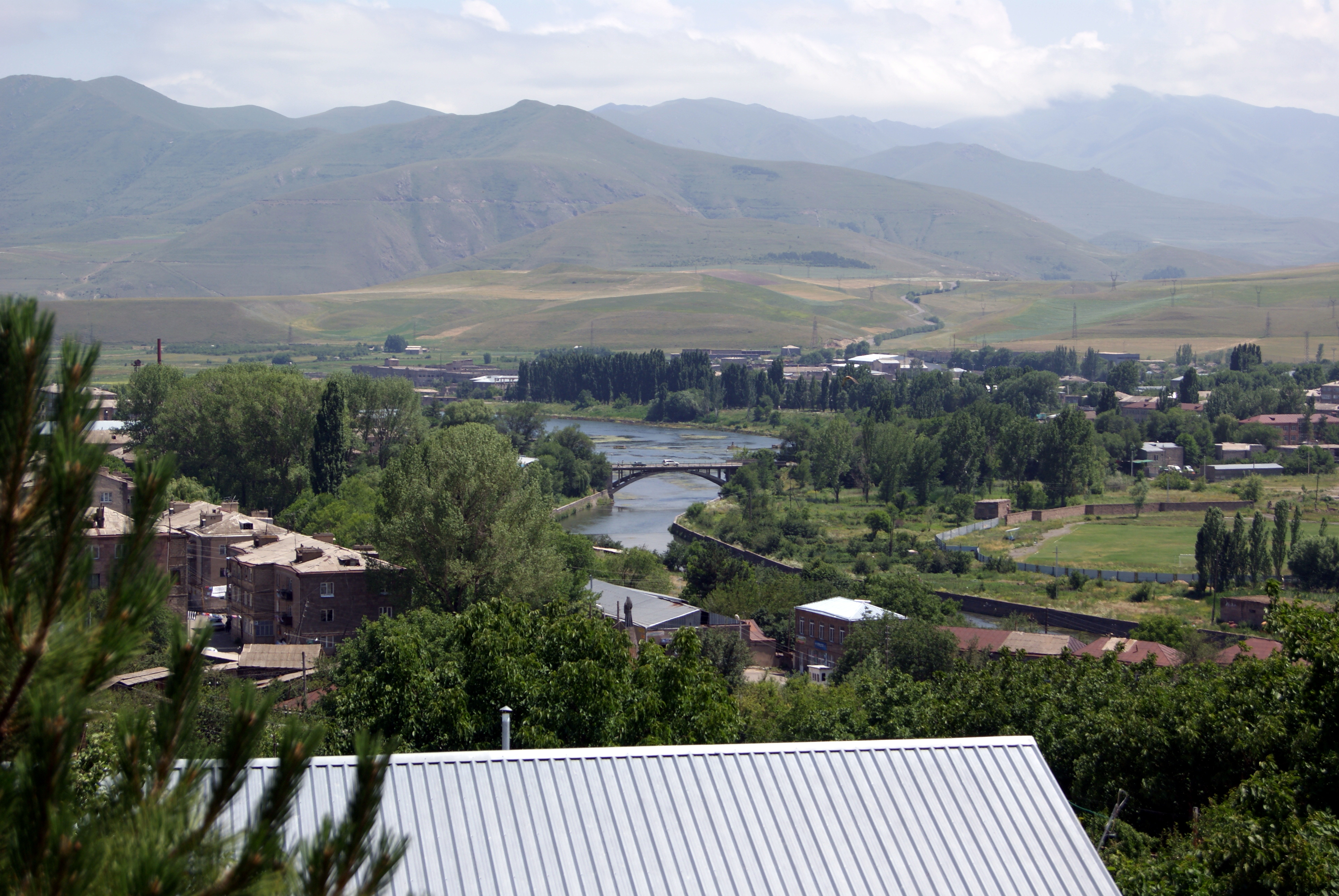
- The Vorotan in Sisian

- Location within Armenia Location within Azerbaijan Location within Caucasus Mountains

Location
- Countries: Armenia and Azerbaijan

Physical characteristics
- Mouth: Hakari
  - coordinates: 39.2037°N 46.7170°E
- Length: 162 km (101 mi)
- Discharge
  - average: 21.5 m^{3}/s (760 cu ft/s)

Basin features
- Progression: Hakari→ Aras→ Kura→ Caspian Sea

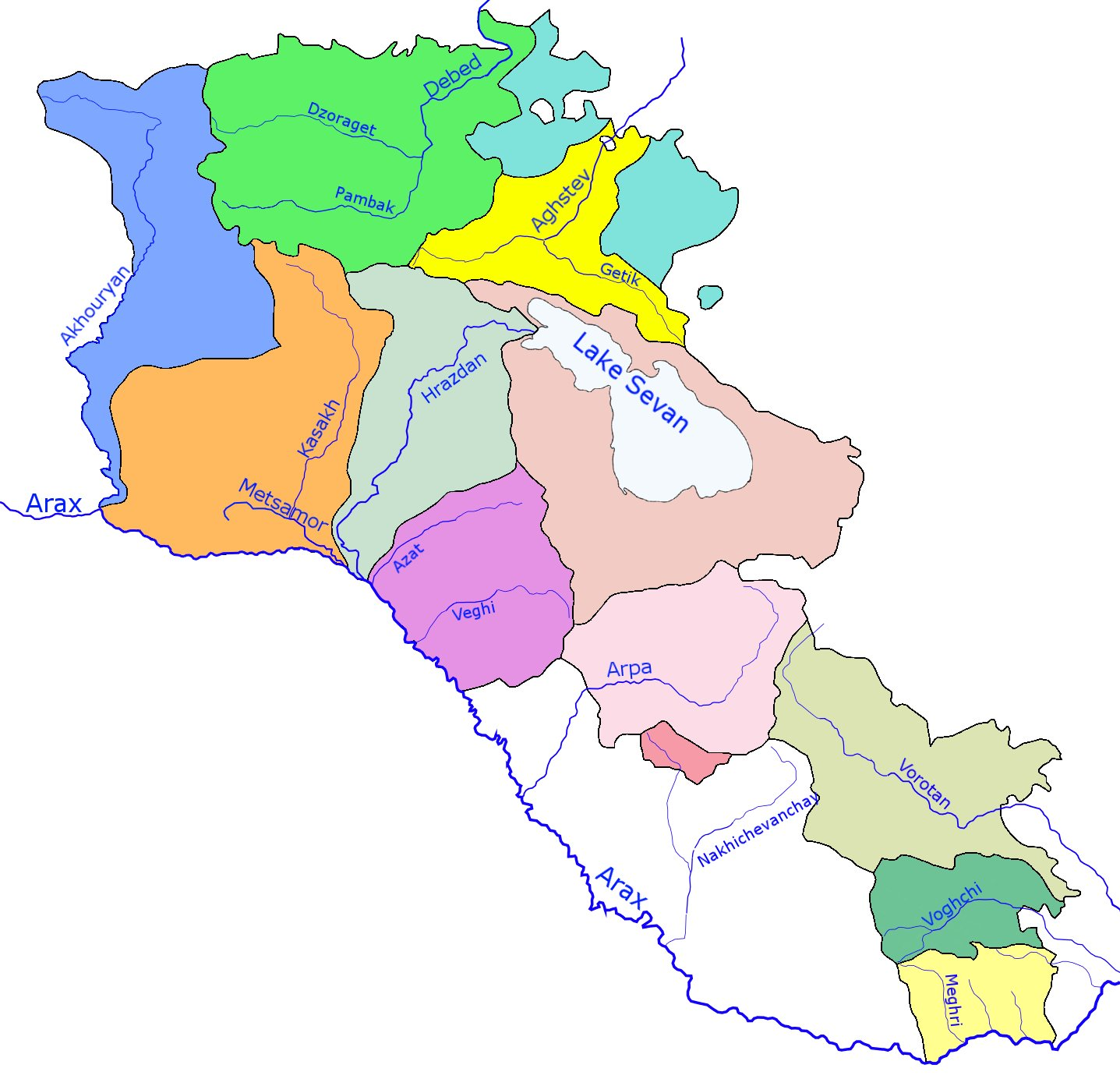
Vorotan river and its basin (light gray) within Armenia

The Vorotan (Armenian: Որոտան), or Bargushad (Armenian: Բարգուշատ), is a transboundary river in the South Caucasus that is the largest right tributary of the Hakari river. It starts from the northwestern slopes of the Syunik Plateau, from the Tsalk pond and adjacent springs at an altitude of 3,045 m, receives the water of streams flowing from several small ponds, as well as the springs of Gorayk village, then it flows in a southeastern direction through the territory of Sisian and Goris regions. It flows through Armenia for 119 kilometres (74 mi) in a generally south-easterly direction. The river enters Azerbaijan again, flowing for 43 km (27 mi) through the districts of Qubadli and Zangilan. The lower section of the Hakari, from its confluence with the Vorotan until its confluence with the Araks river, is sometimes considered to be part of the Vorotan.

== Course of the river ==
The river flows mostly through mountainous regions of Armenia and in several places has formed deep canyons. The towns of Sisian and Qubadli lie along its course. Six kilometers from Sisian, the river forms a waterfall — the "Shaki Waterfall" (Armenian: Շաքիի ջրվեժ) — that is 18m high. The river forms a natural monument – the "Devil's Bridge" — near Tatev Monastery. There are mineral pools at the base of the travertine arch.

== Damming the river ==
During the Soviet period, three reservoirs forming the Vorotan Cascade were constructed. They supply Armenia with hydro-electric power and water for irrigation. To increase the volume of water in Lake Sevan, a 21.6-kilometre (13.4 mi) tunnel was constructed to abstract some of the Vorotan's waters and divert them to the lake.

Begun during the 1980s, work was stopped in 1988, when only 18 km (11 mi) had been completed, because of the outbreak of the First Nagorno-Karabakh War. The Armenian government finally completed the Vorotan tunnel in 2003. Prior to this, a second tunnel — "Arpa–Sevan" — was completed in 1981. This diverts some water from the Arpa River for Lake Sevan. The waters coming through the two tunnels have resulted in the lake's water level rising. In 2007 it was reported that the water level had risen by 2.44 metres (8.0 ft) in the previous six years.

== Gallery ==
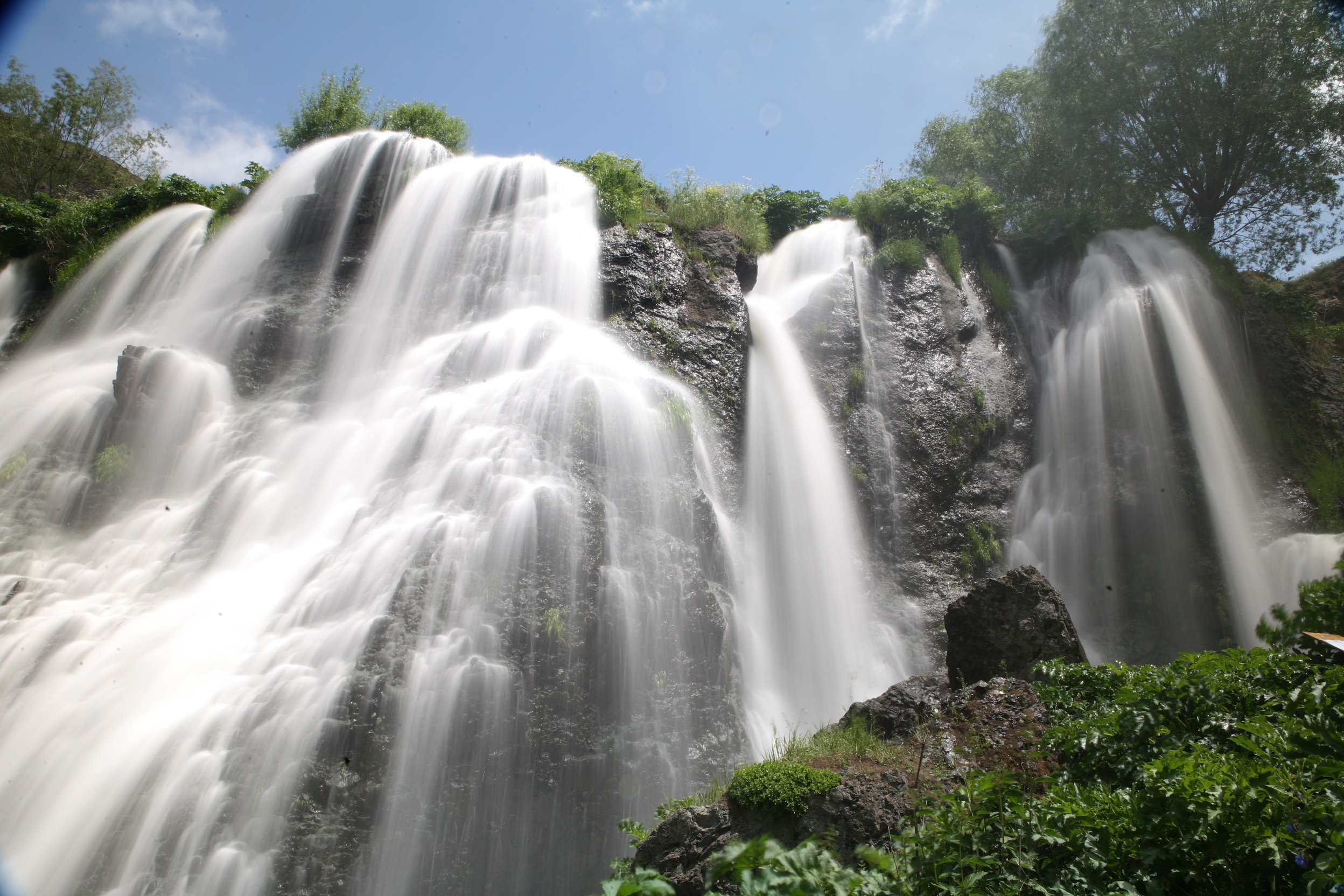
Shaki Waterfall

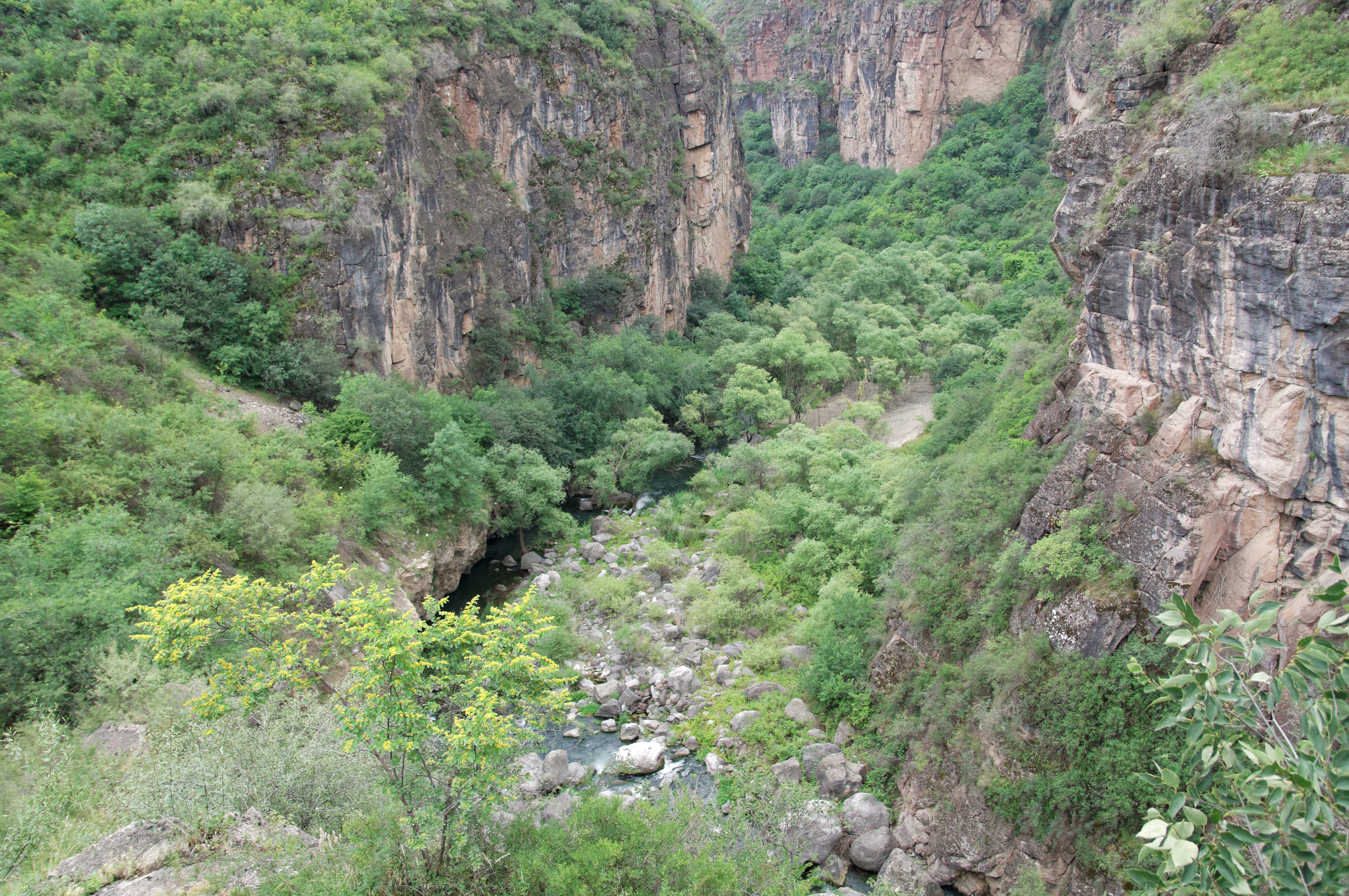
Vorotan River Canyon near Tatev

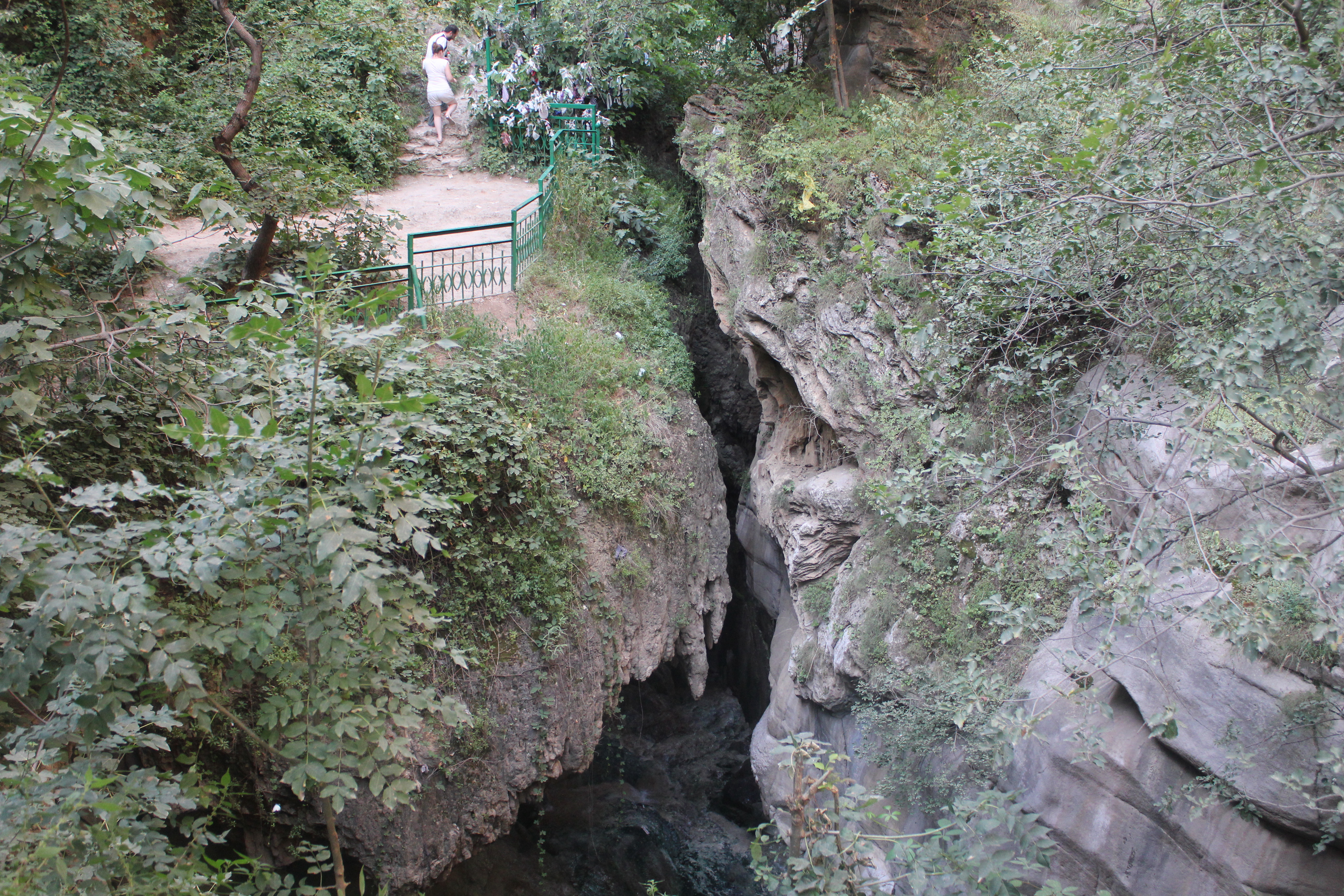
The "Devil's Bridge" natural arch near Tatev Monastery

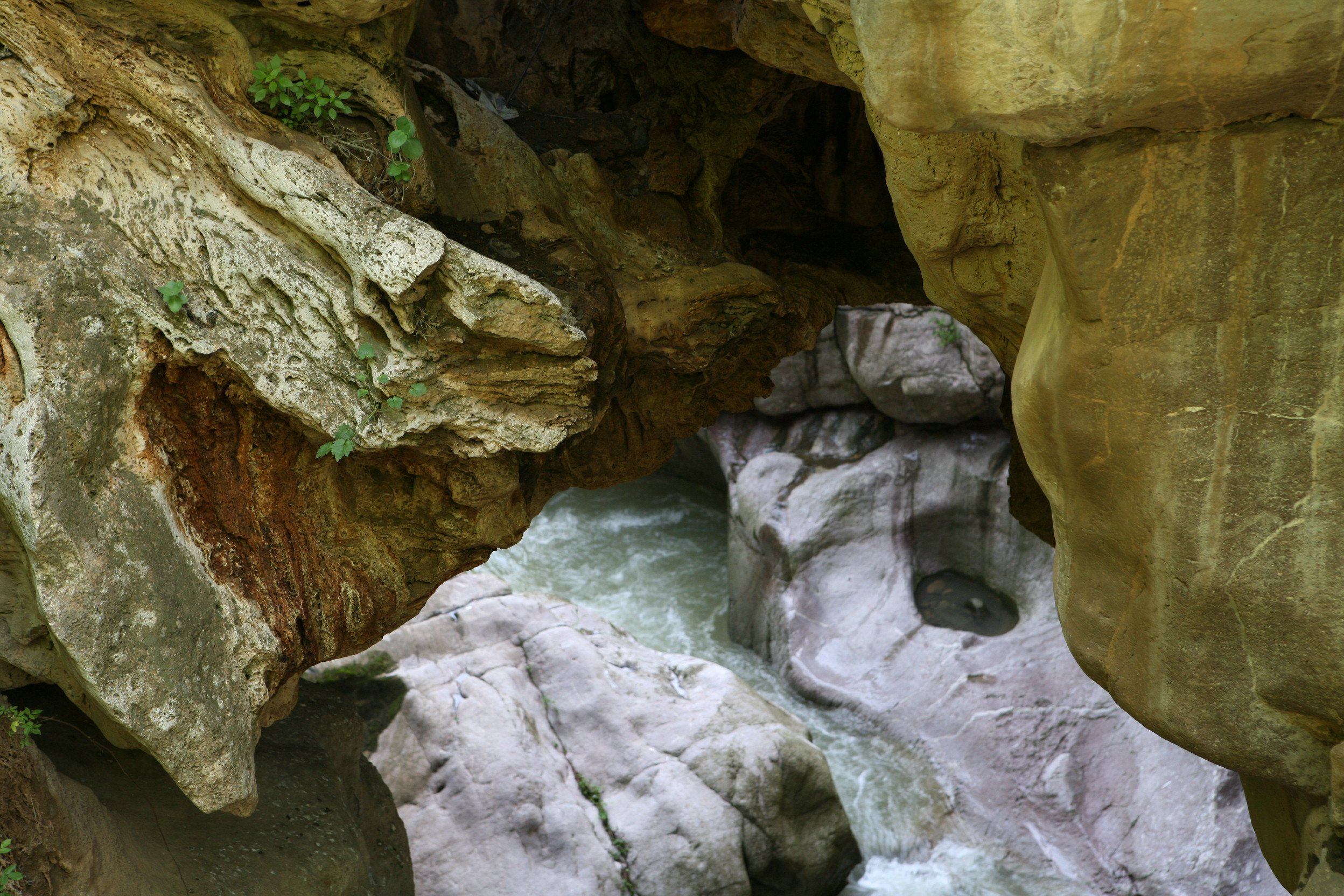
The base of the "Devil's Bridge" 1 km from Goris

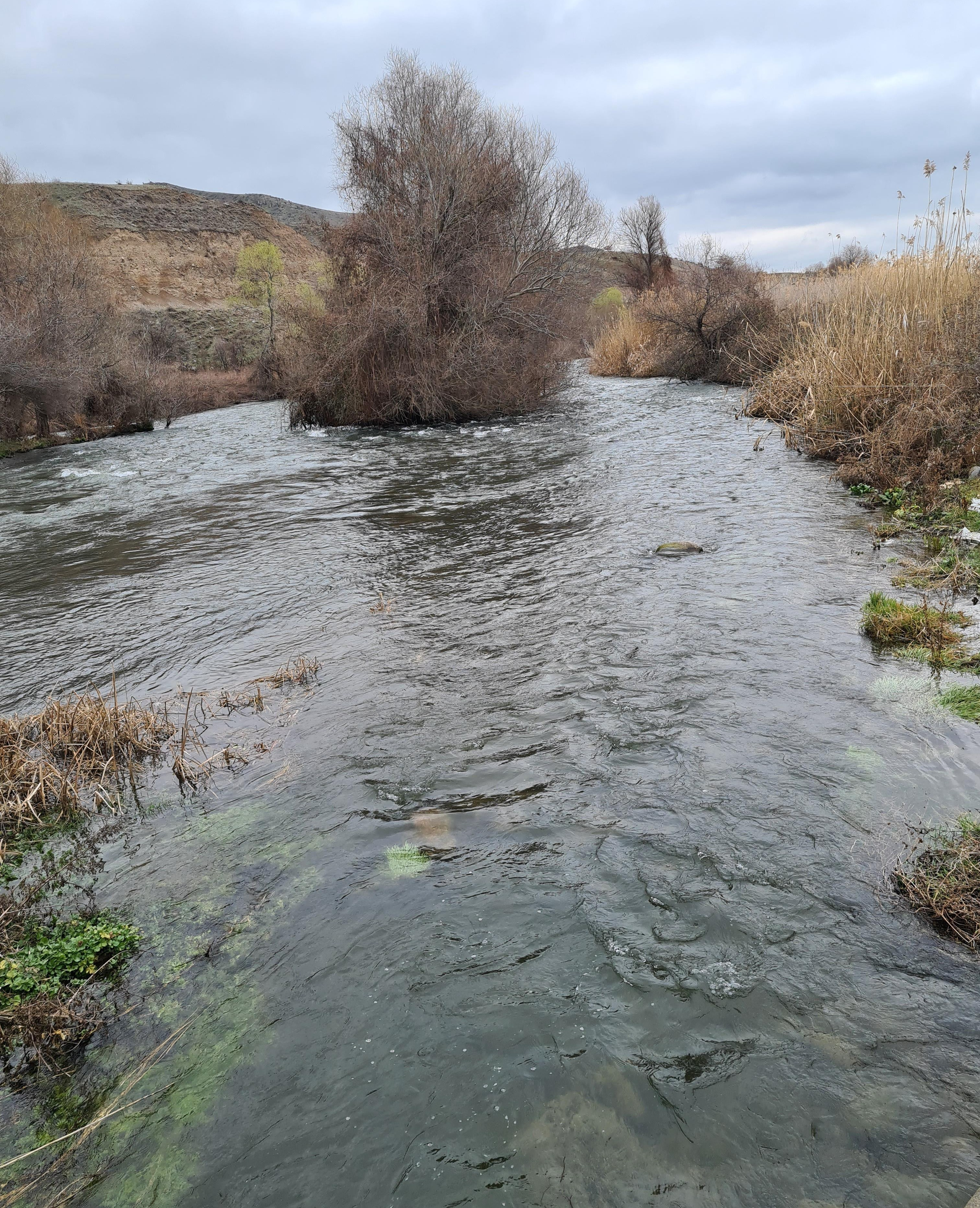
The Vorotan flowing through Qubadli District
