= Armenian Gampr =

Armenian breed of dog

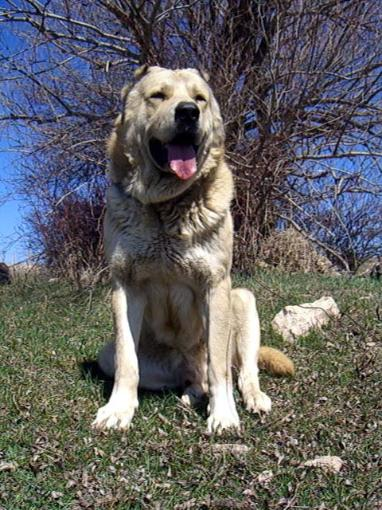
- Other names: Armenian: գամփռ, gamp’ṙ; Gampr; Armenian Wolfhound Gampr
- Origin: Armenia
Traits
Height	Males	from 65 cm (25 in)
	Females	from 60 cm (23 in)
Weight	Males	average: 55 kg (120 lb)
	Females	average: 50 kg (110 lb)
- Coat: long or short, with soft undercoat
- Colour: any
Kennel club standards
- Armenian Kennel Club: standard

The Armenian Gampr (Armenian: Գամփռ, romanized: Gamp’ṙ) is an Armenian breed of flock guardian dog native to the Armenian Highlands. It falls within the Ovcharka group of livestock guardian dogs, which can be found throughout the Transcaucasus area. It was recognised in 2011 by the International Kennel Union in Moscow, under the guidance of the Armenian Kennel Club, which had developed the breed standard in the 1990s.

== History ==
The Gampr is the traditional flock guardian dog of Armenia. From the 1920s, when Armenia came under the control of the Soviet Union, large numbers of the dogs were taken to Russia, where they played a crucial part in the development of the Caucasian Shepherd Dog, or Caucasian Ovcharka. A few were exported to the United States at about the same time.

Following the independence of Armenia in 1991, the dog acquired new significance as national heritage. The first breed standard was drawn up in the 1990s, and in 2011 the breed was recognised by the International Kennel Union, an organisation based in Moscow.

== Characteristics ==
The Gampr is a large and powerful dog, weighing some 50 kg and standing at least 60 cm at the withers, with the usual sexual dimorphism – dogs are somewhat larger and heavier than bitches. The coat may be of any colour; it may be short or long, and always has a soft undercoat.

== Use ==
The principal traditional use of the Gampr was as a flock guardian dog, protecting flocks of sheep and goats from attack – particularly by wolves – on the upland pastures of mountainous regions of Armenia. Although sheep-herding has declined in the country since independence, wolves continue to threaten flocks; in 2006 some 2000 dogs were still in use for this purpose. They may also be used to guard people and property, another traditional use.

== Gallery ==
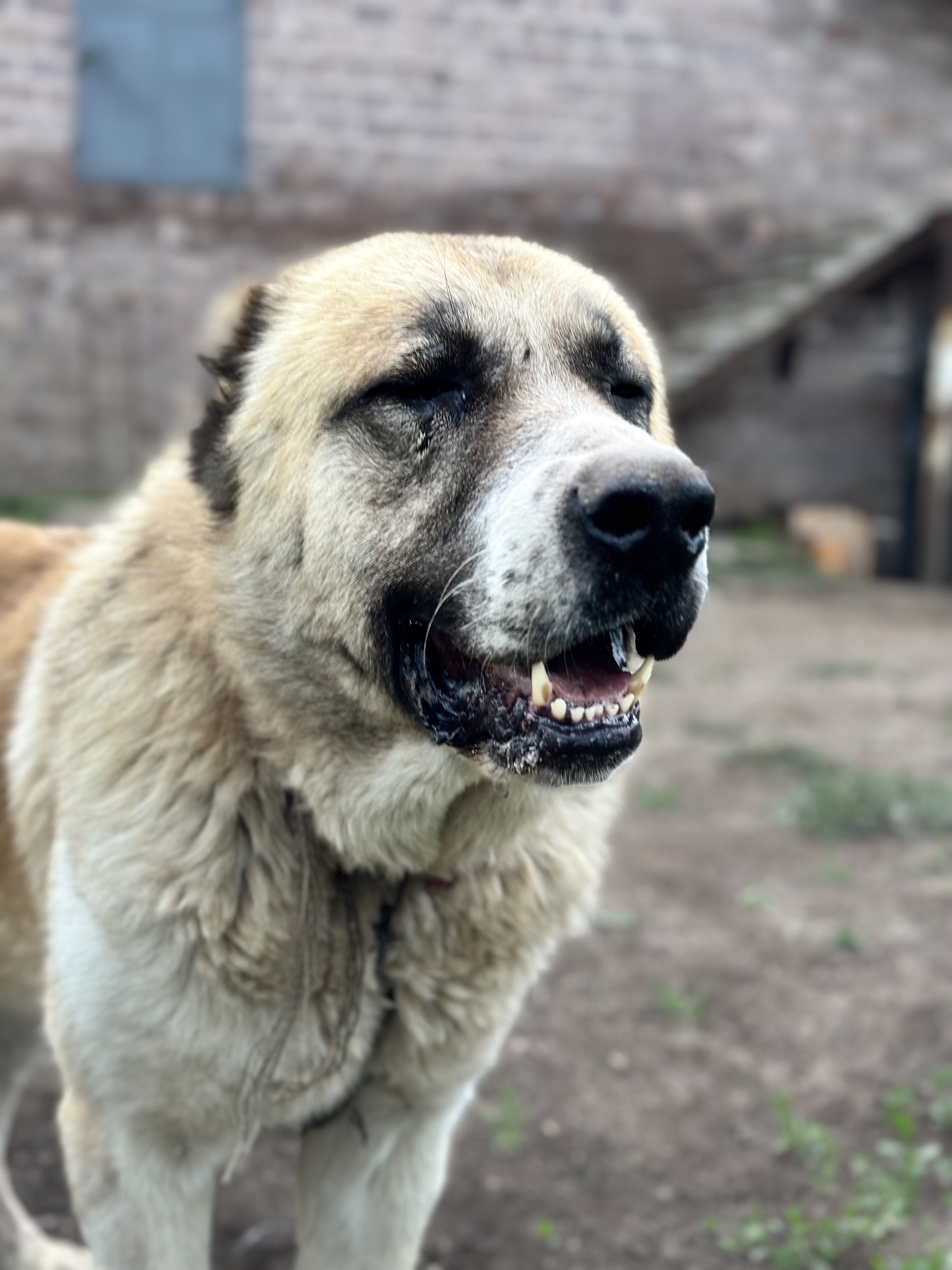

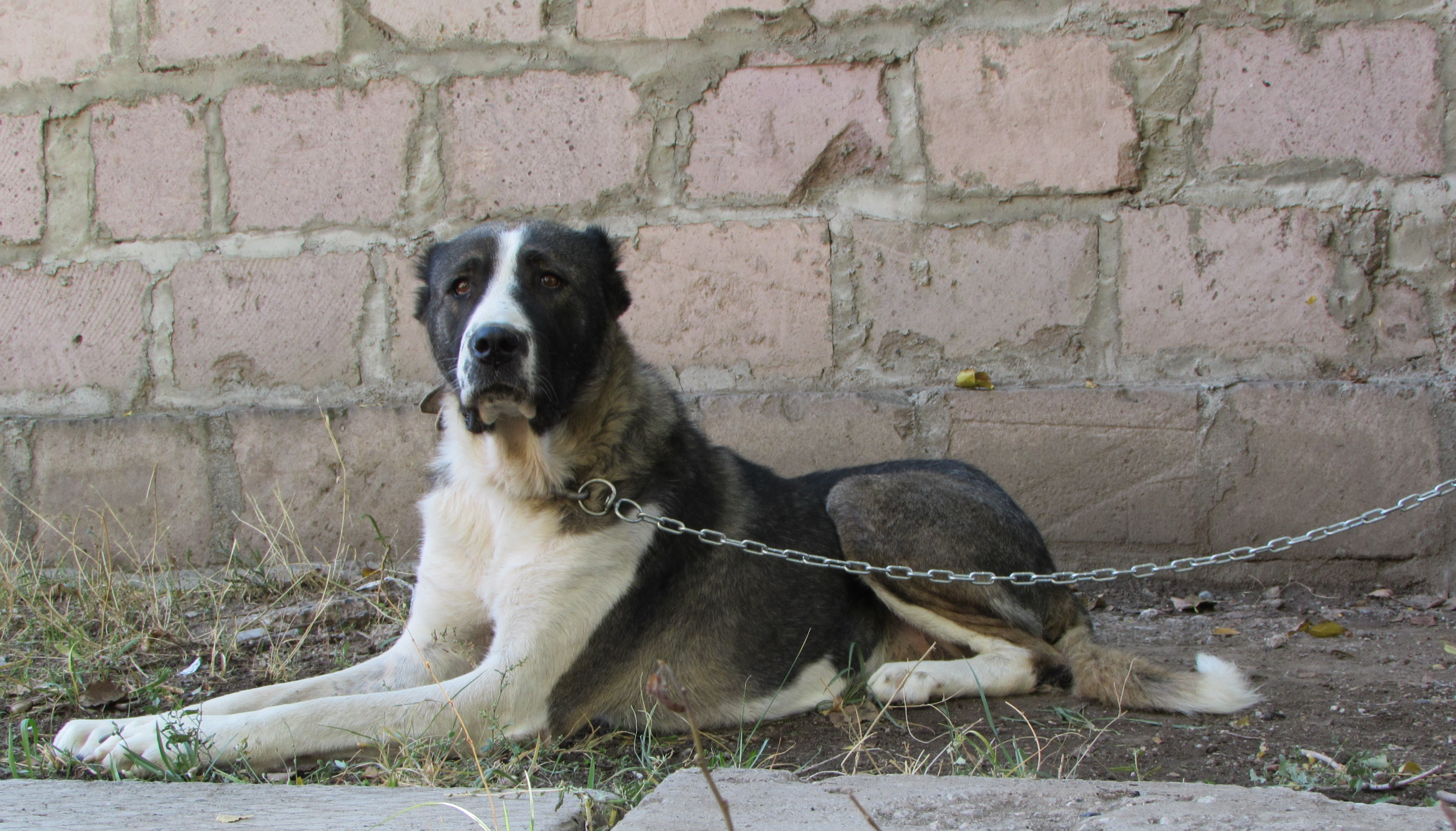

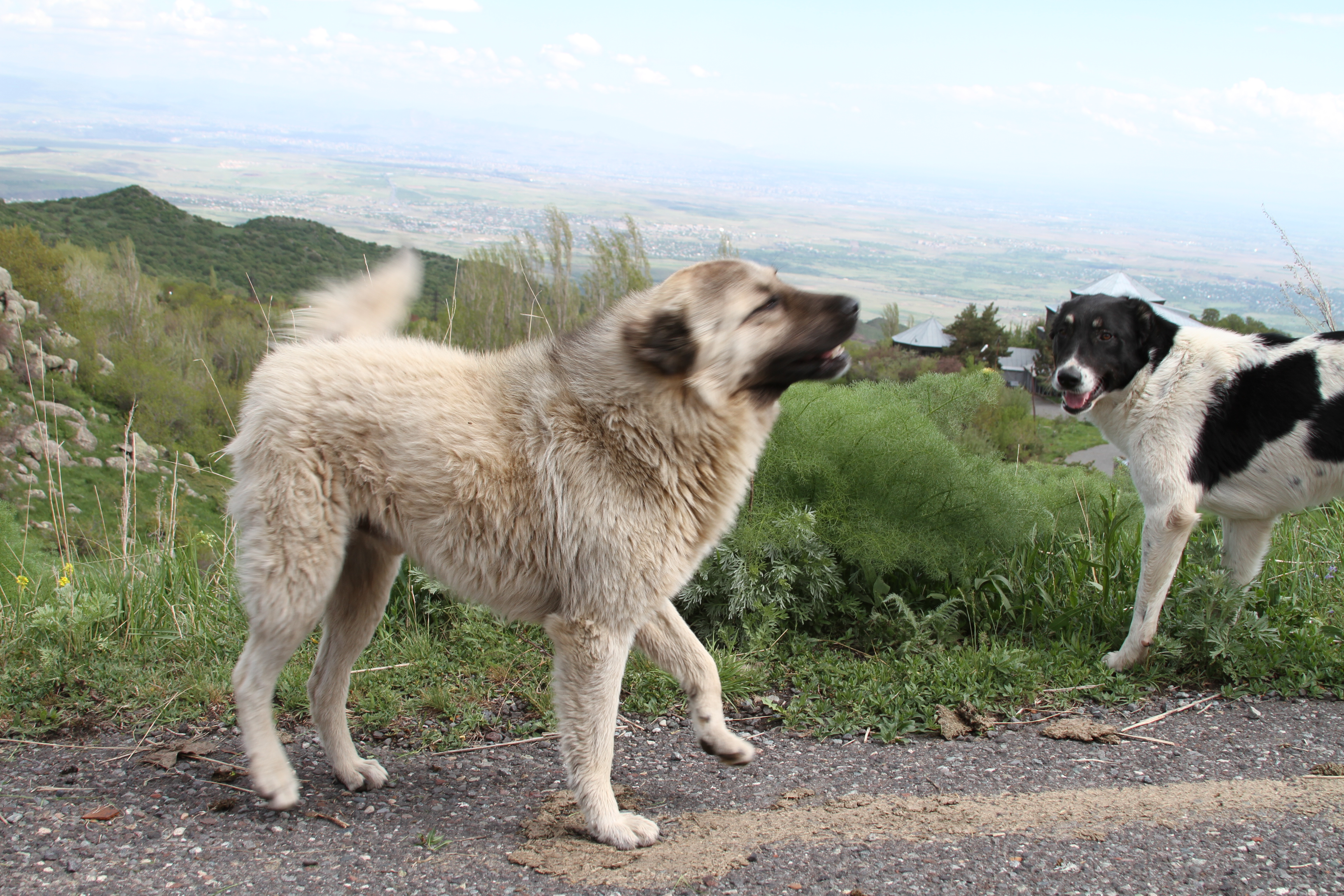

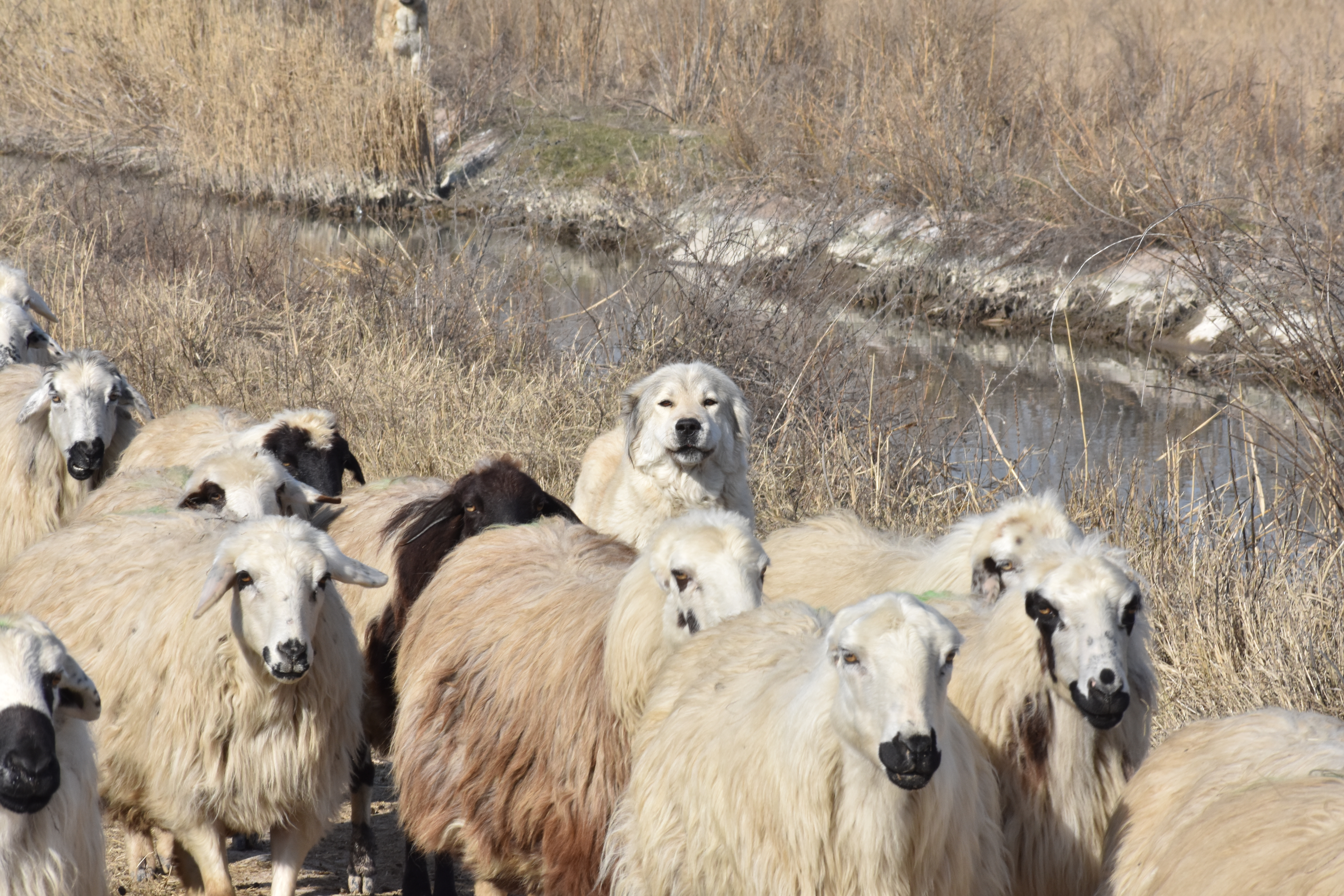
Guarding sheep at the Armash fishponds

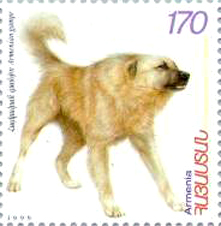
On a 1999 Armenian stamp

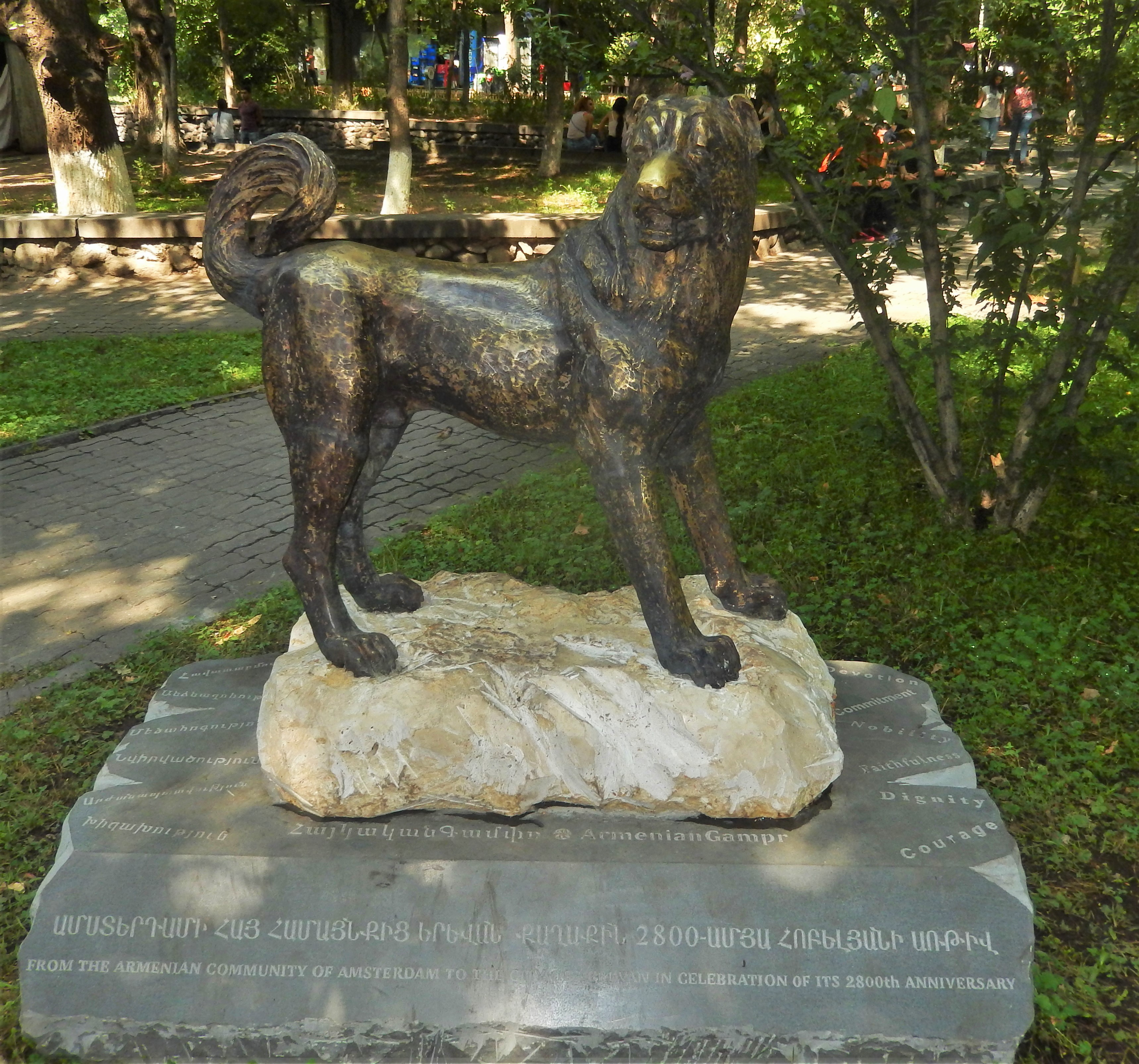
2018 statue in Yerevan

It is depicted on the logo of the 2025 IIHF World Championship Division IV held in Yerevan.
