= Shaki, Armenia =

Shaki Շաքի
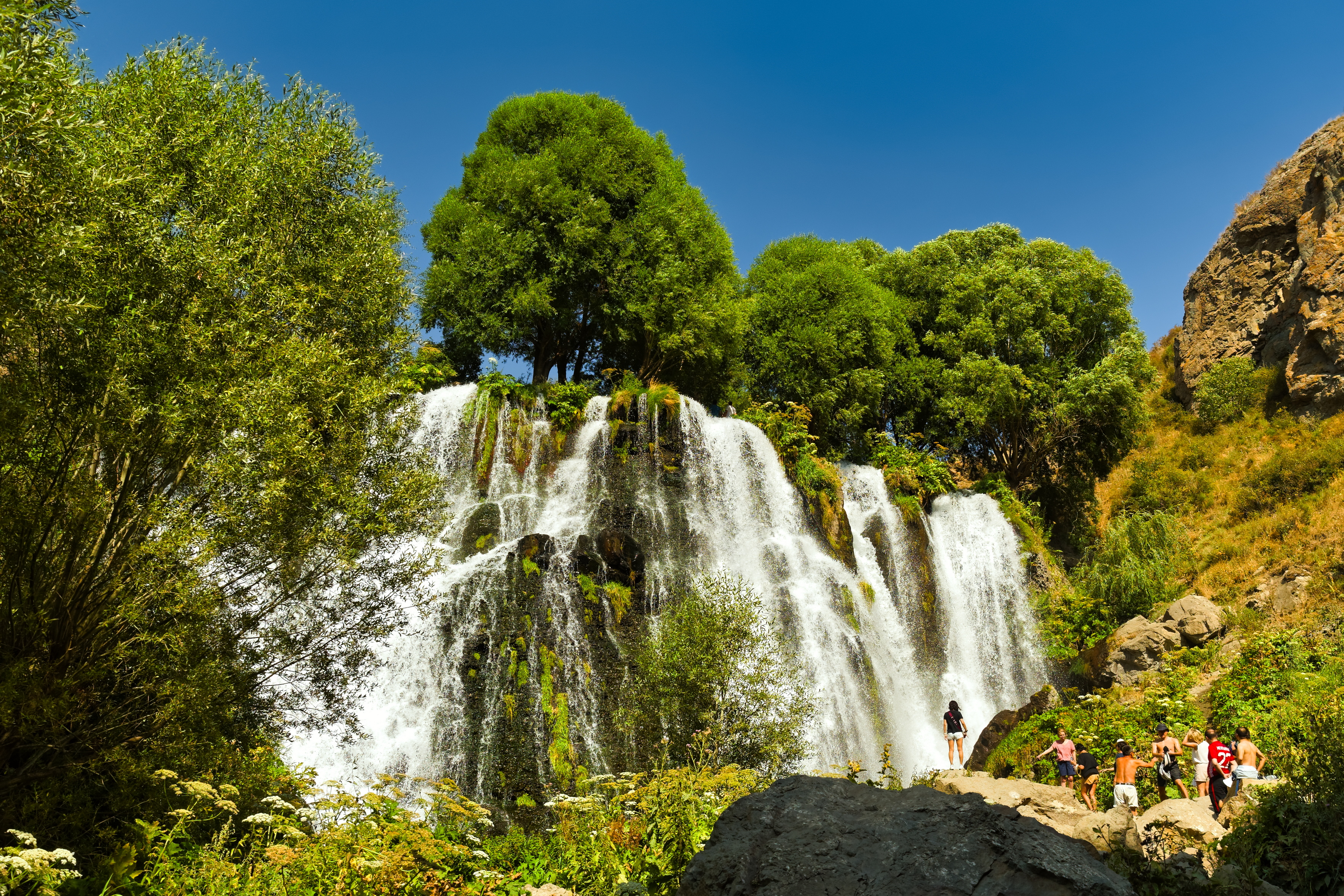
- Shaki Waterfall

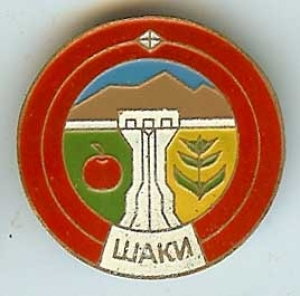
- Coat of arms

- Location within Armenia Location within Syunik Province
- Coordinates: 39°33′51″N 45°59′51″E
- Country: Armenia
- Province: Syunik
- Municipality: Sisian

Area
  - Total: 60.67 km^{2} (23.42 sq mi)

Population (2011)
  - Total: 1,197
  - Density: 19.73/km^{2} (51.10/sq mi)
- Time zone: UTC+4 (AMT)

Shaki (Armenian: Շաքի) is a village in the Sisian Municipality of the Syunik Province in Armenia, north of Sisian. The village's Holy Mother of God Church opened in 2003. The Shaki Waterfall is near the village.

== Demographics ==
The 2011 Armenia census reported its population was 1,197, down from 1,390 at the 2001 census.

== Gallery ==
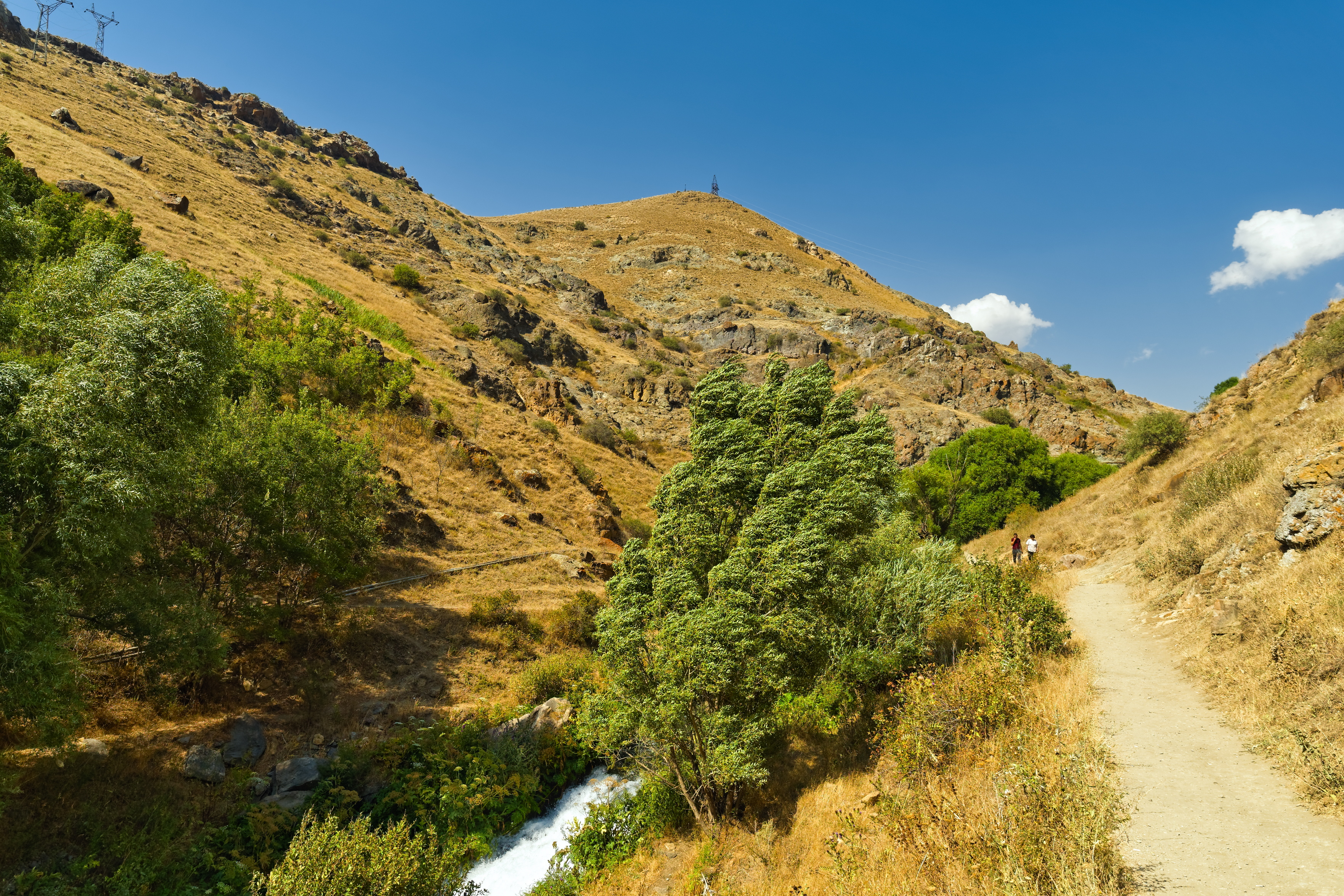
Scenery around Shaki river

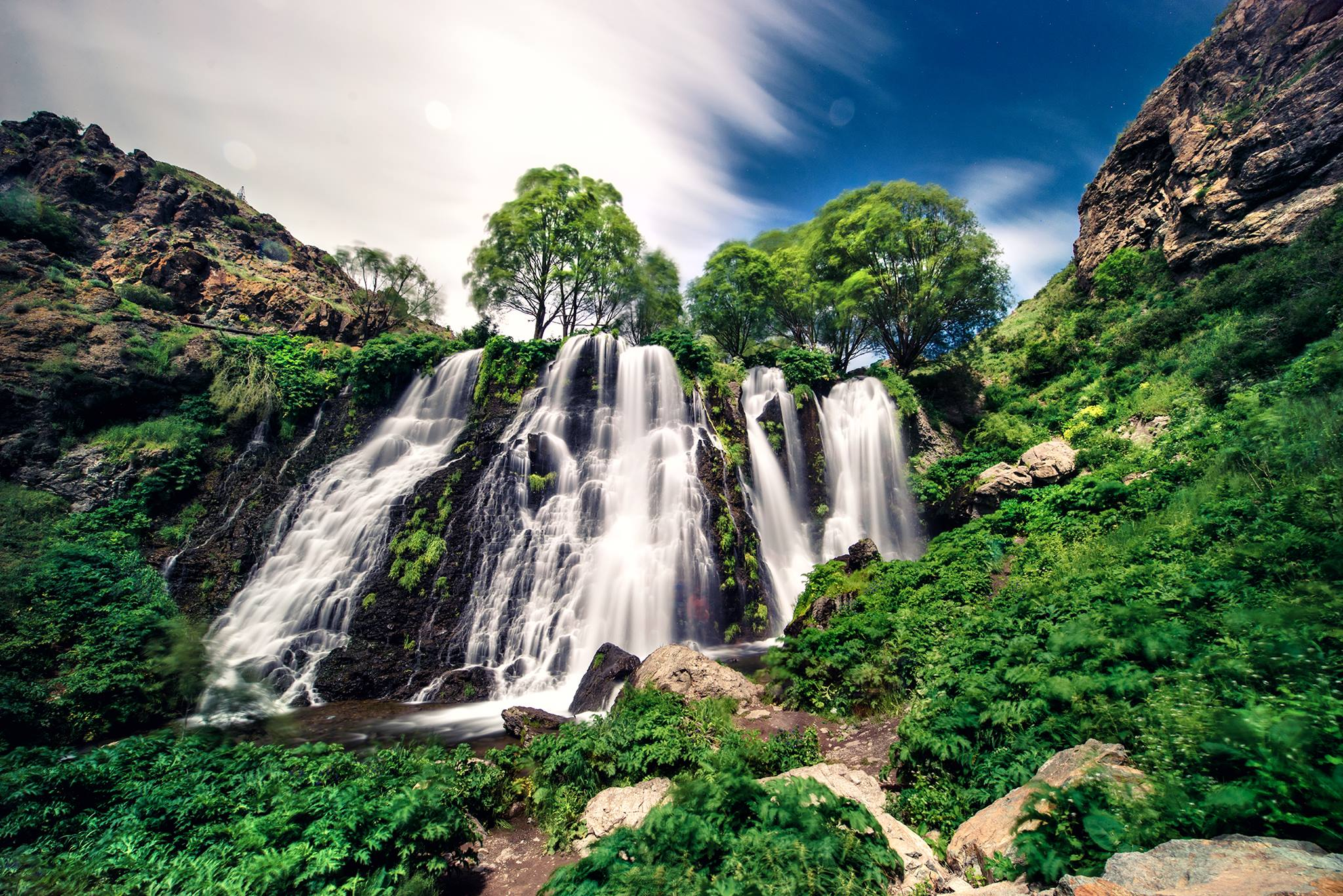
Shaki waterfall

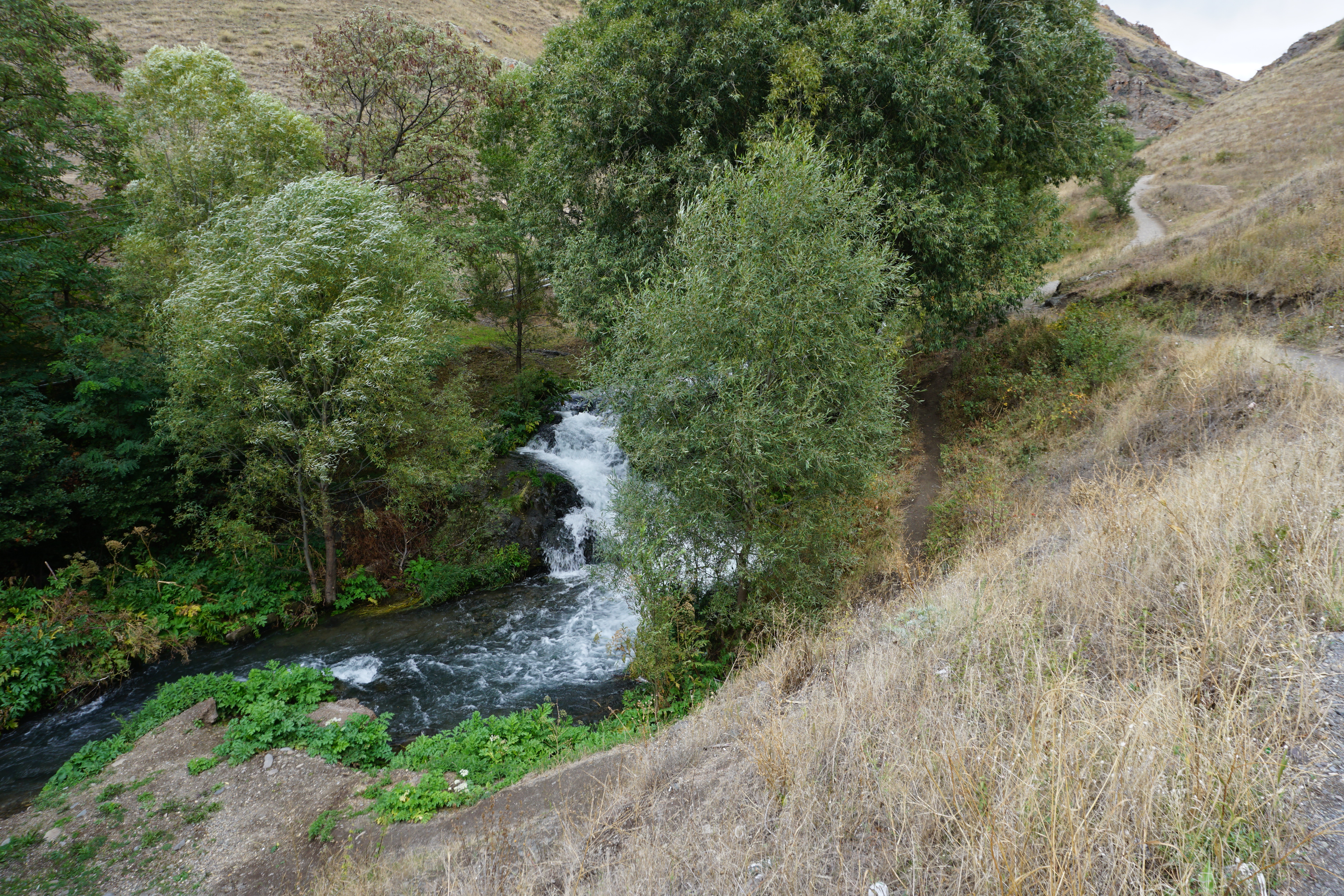
Scenery around Shaki river
