= Metsamor Important Bird Area =

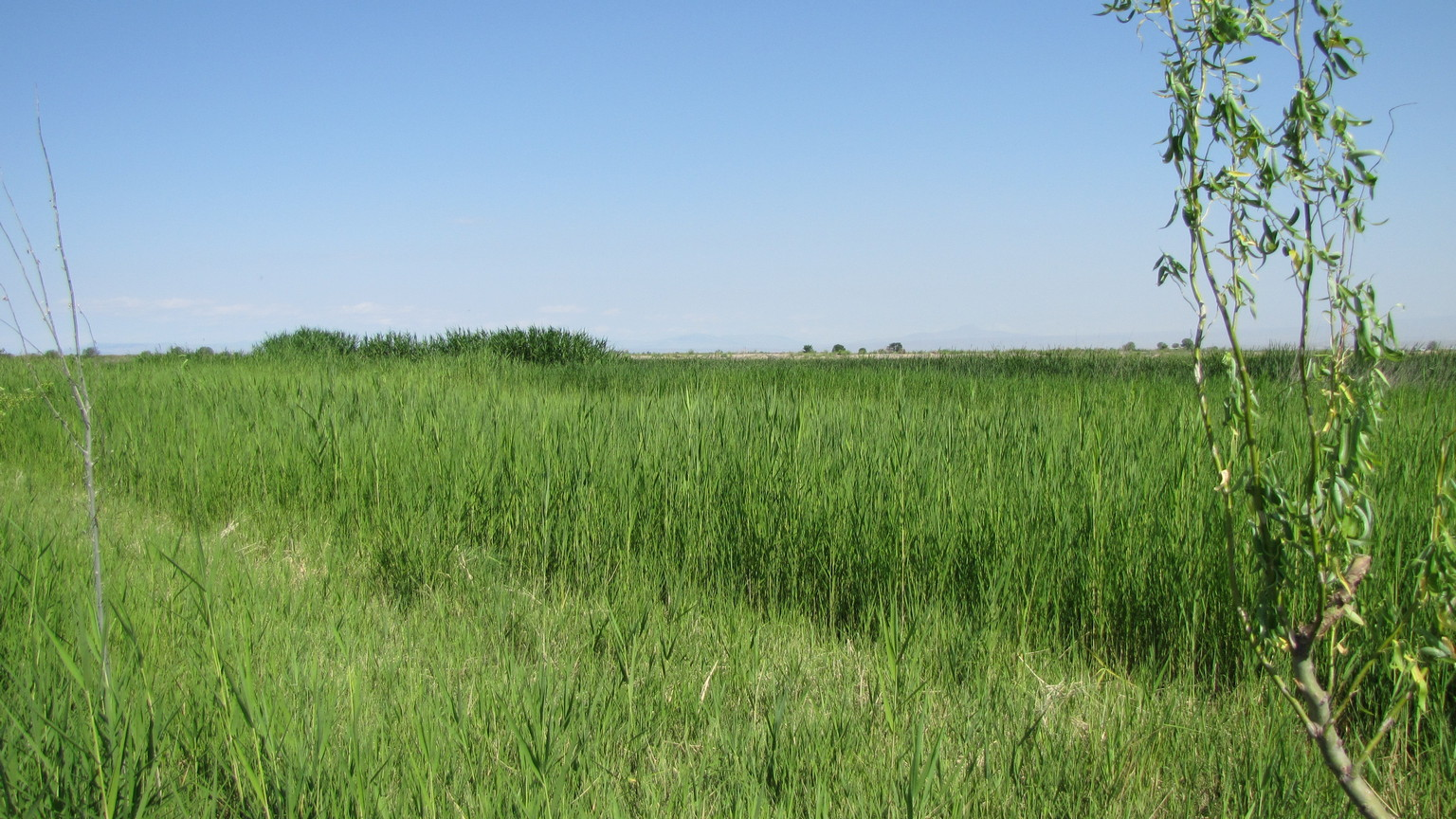
- Metsamor IBA
- Interactive map of Metsamor Important Bird Area
- Type: Community land
- Nearest city: Metsamor
- Coordinates: 40.08°N 44.21°E
- Area: 10,296 hectares (25,440 acres)
- Created: 2002
- Designation: Important Bird Area

Metsamor Important Bird Area is a 10,296-hectare (25,440-acre) region of Armenia designated by BirdLife International, as an "Important Bird Area" (IBA) with the main aim of protecting bird species and habitats. The area is also recognized as an Emerald site and Key Biodiversity Area.

The IBA is located in Ararat Plain of Armenia and is represented by combination of wetlands, semi-desert, and mosaic arable lands.

Overall there are 225 bird species recorded in this area, including 92 breeding species and 133 migratory and wintering ones.

The area hosts globally threatened Common Pochard, Northern Lapwing, Black-tailed Godwit, European turtle dove, Pallid Harrier; Nationally threatened Levant Sparrowhawk, Black-winged Stilt, Savii's Warbler; as well as for the species included in Appendix II of the Bern Convention, such as White Stork, Roller, Syrian Woodpecker, and Lesser Grey Shrike.

The area was designated as an IBA in 2002. It is one of eighteen Important Bird Areas in Armenia.
