= Armash, Armenia =

Armash Արմաշ
- Location within Armenia Location within Ararat
- Coordinates: 39°46′00″N 44°48′30″E
- Country: Armenia
- Province: Ararat
- Municipality: Ararat

Population (2011)
  - Total: 2,378
- Time zone: UTC+4
  - Summer (DST): UTC+5

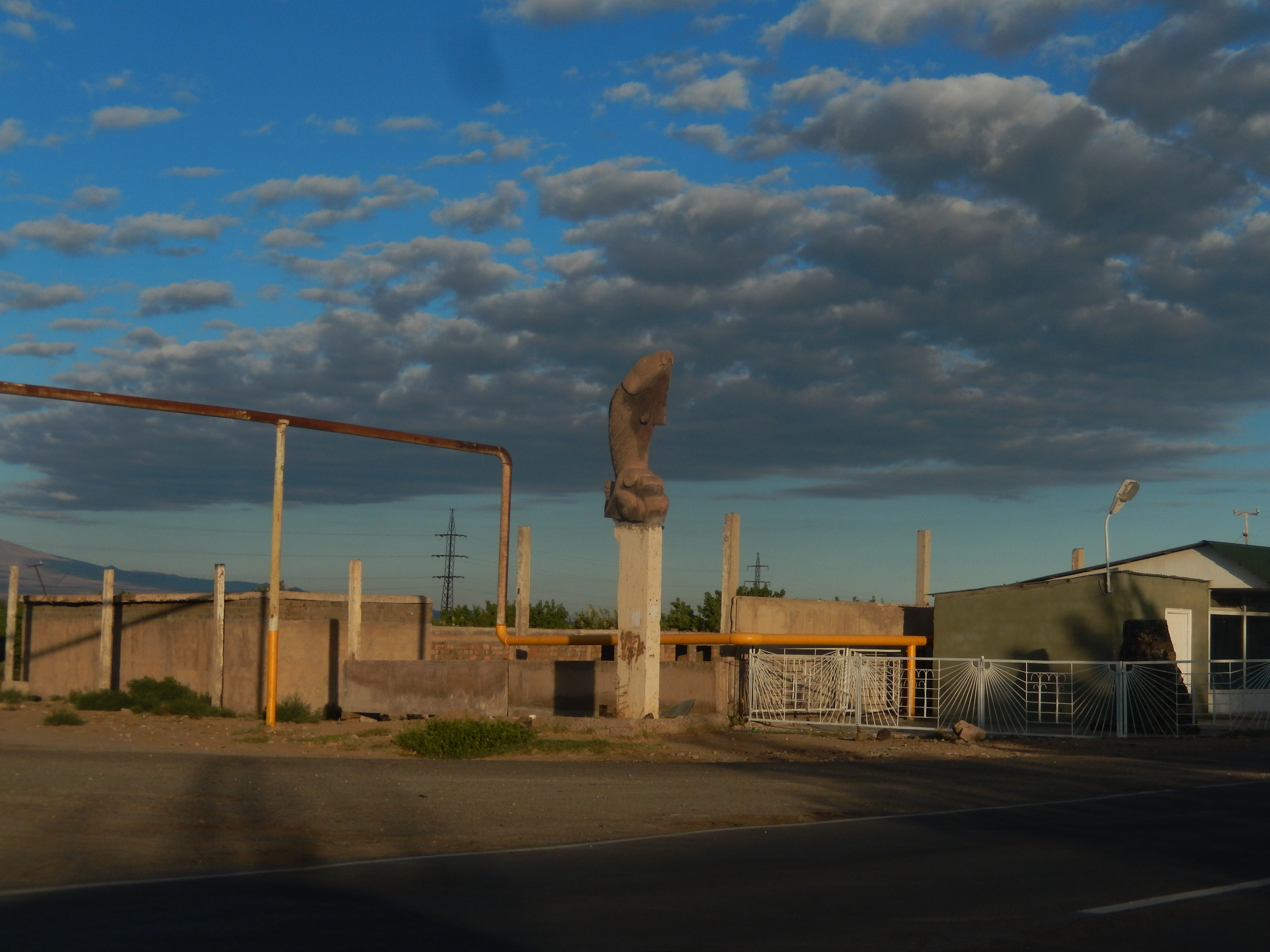
Fish sculpture in Surenavan village, near Armash village, Ararat Province, 2016

Armash (Armenian: Արմաշ) is a village in the Ararat Municipality of the Ararat Province of Armenia. Armash has a population of 2,378, most of whom are farmers. The main crops produced are watermelons and tomatoes. The Armash Important Bird Area is nearby. It was founded in 1926 by Armenians from Istanbul (Constantinople).
