= Noravank Important Bird Area =

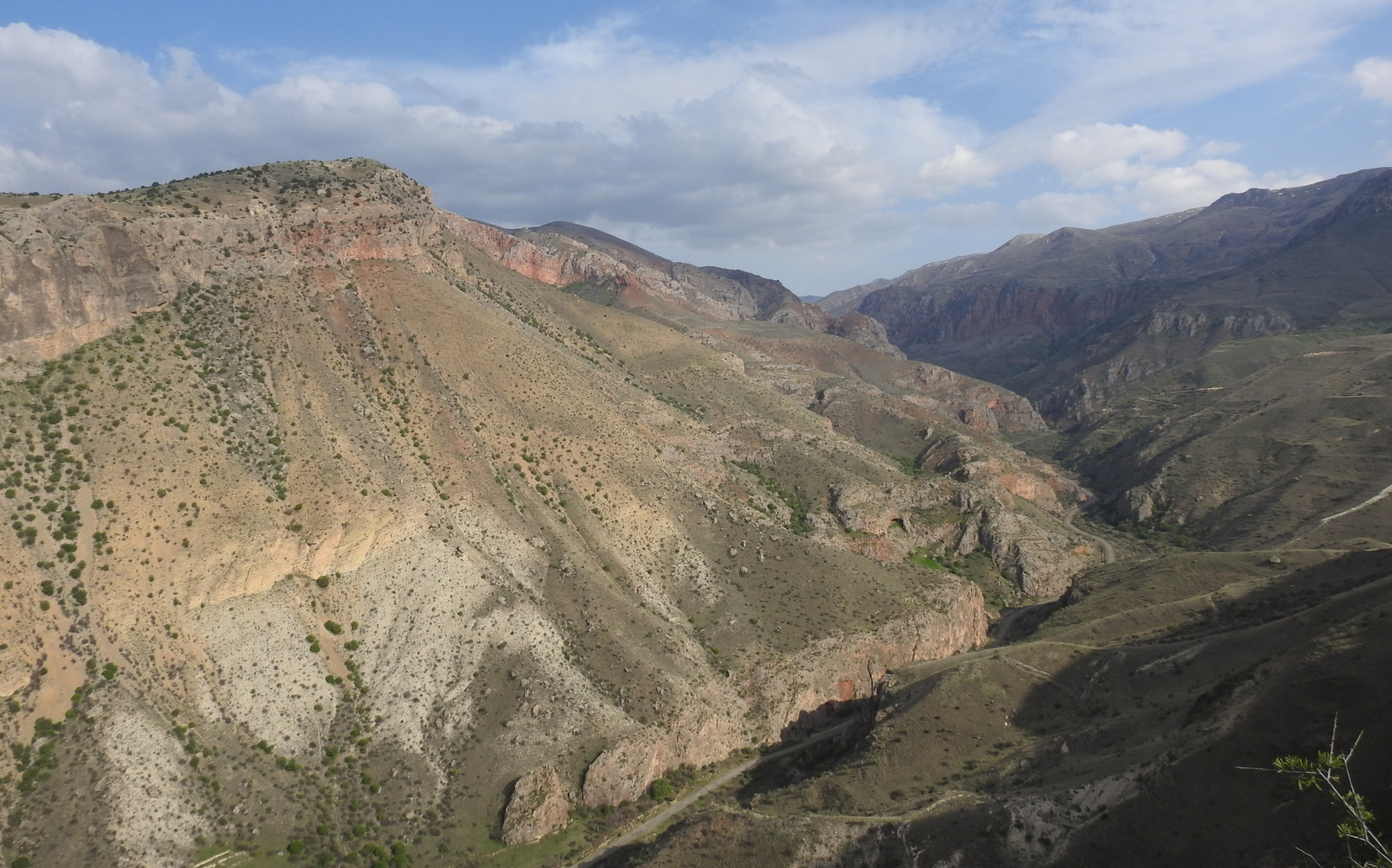
- View of Noravank canyon
- Interactive map of Noravank Important Bird Area
- Type: Nature reserve
- Coordinates: 39.66°N 45.23°E
- Area: 14,002 hectares (34,600 acres)
- Created: 2002
- Designation: Important Bird Area

Noravank Important Bird Area is a 14,002-hectare (34,600-acre) region of Armenia designated as worthy of conservation for its avifauna, by BirdLife International, as an "Important Bird Area" (IBA), with the main aim of protecting bird species and habitats. Within Armenia, it is also known as the "Gnishik Protected Landscape".

The IBA sits at the slopes of the Vayots Dzor mountains, and includes riparian shrubland, semi-desert, juniper woodland, arid mountain steppe and mesophilic meadow habitats.

100 breeding species and 46 migratory or wintering species of birds have been recorded.

A caretaker employed at the IBA has worked with the eponymous monastery, Noravank, to set up a feeding station for cinereous vultures.

Other species recorded at the IBA include short-toed eagle, golden eagle, bearded vulture, Egyptian vulture, Eurasian eagle owl, lanner falcon, semi-collared flycatcher, European roller, chukar, white stork, Levant sparrowhawk, and, on passage, pallid harrier, lesser kestrel and greater spotted eagle.

The area was designated as an IBA in 2002. It is one of eighteen Important Bird Areas in Armenia.
