= Shaki Waterfall =

Lake in Armenia

- Շաքի ջրվեժ
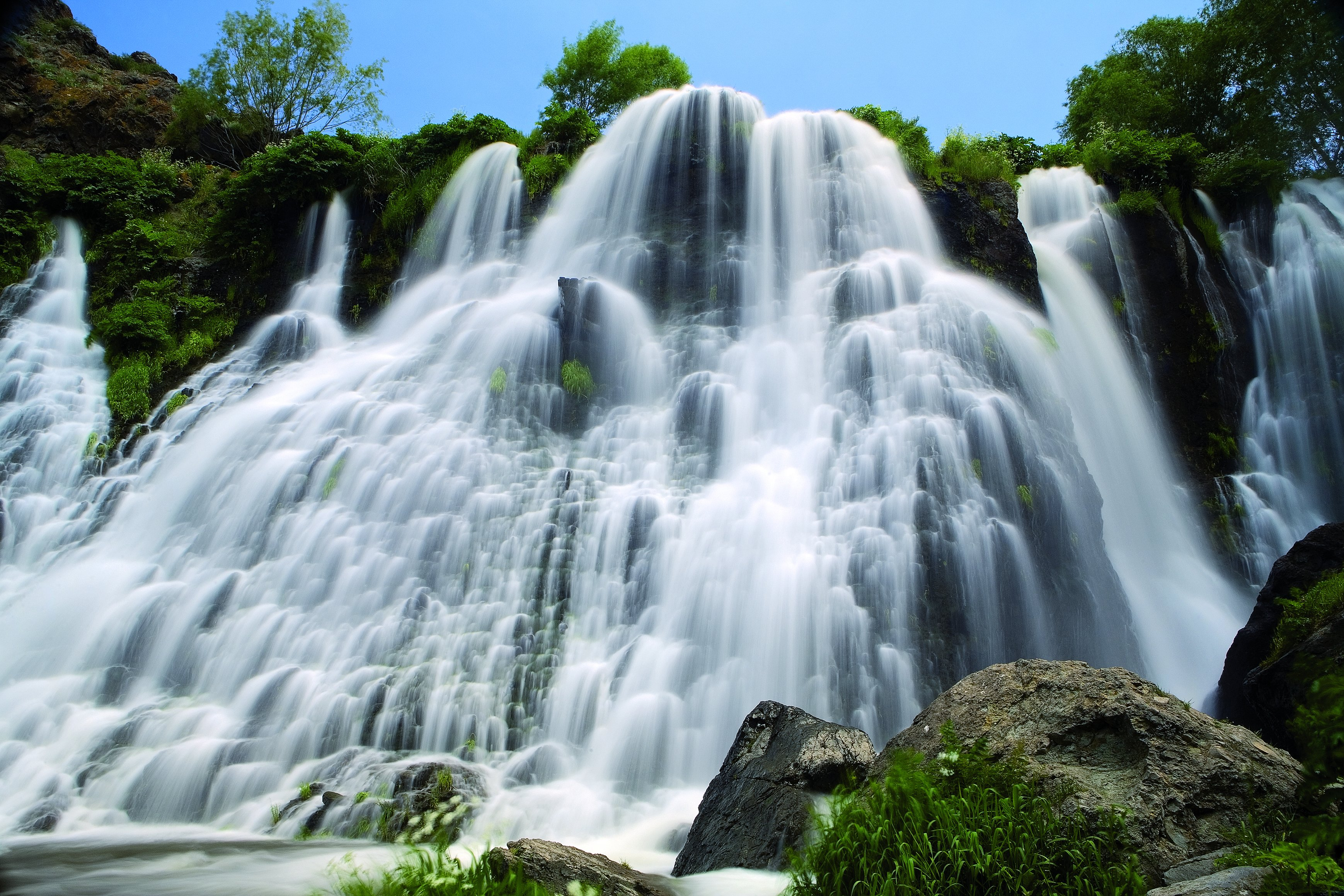
- Interactive map of Shaki Waterfall
- Location: near Shaki, 6 km north to Sisian, Syunik, Armenia
- Coordinates: 39.552256°N 45.993825°E
- Total height: 18 m (59 ft)
- Watercourse: Vorotan River

Shaki Waterfall (Armenian: Շաքիի ջրվեժ) is a waterfall in Armenia, with a height of 18 m. It is located in Syunik Province.

The Shaki Waterfall is situated 6 km from the town of Sisian. On the left side of the river Vorotan's gorge, basalt lava flows have solidified to form a ledge 18 meters high from which the waterfall cascades down.

It is registered in the list of state natural monuments of the Ministry of Environment of Armenia.

== Gallery ==
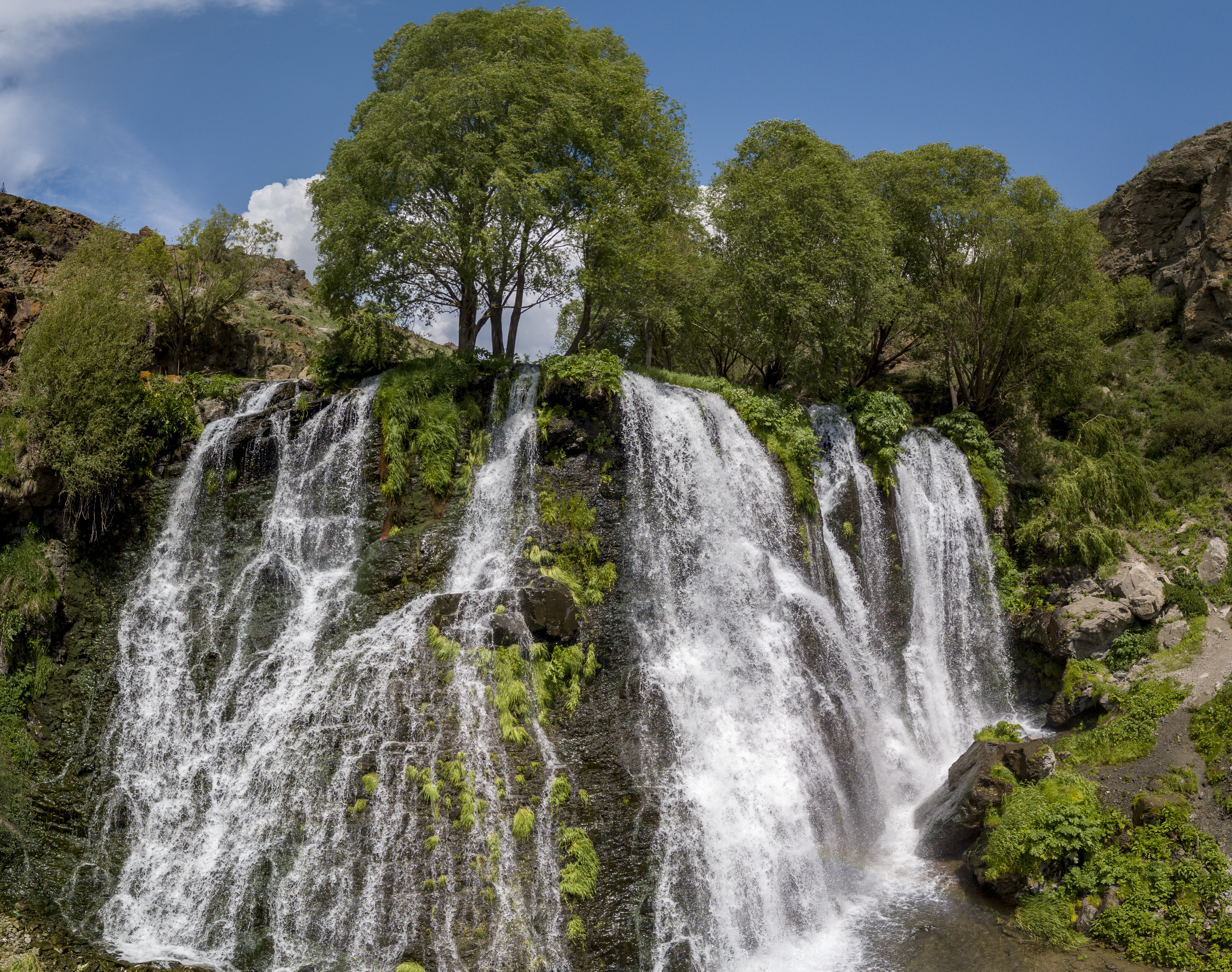

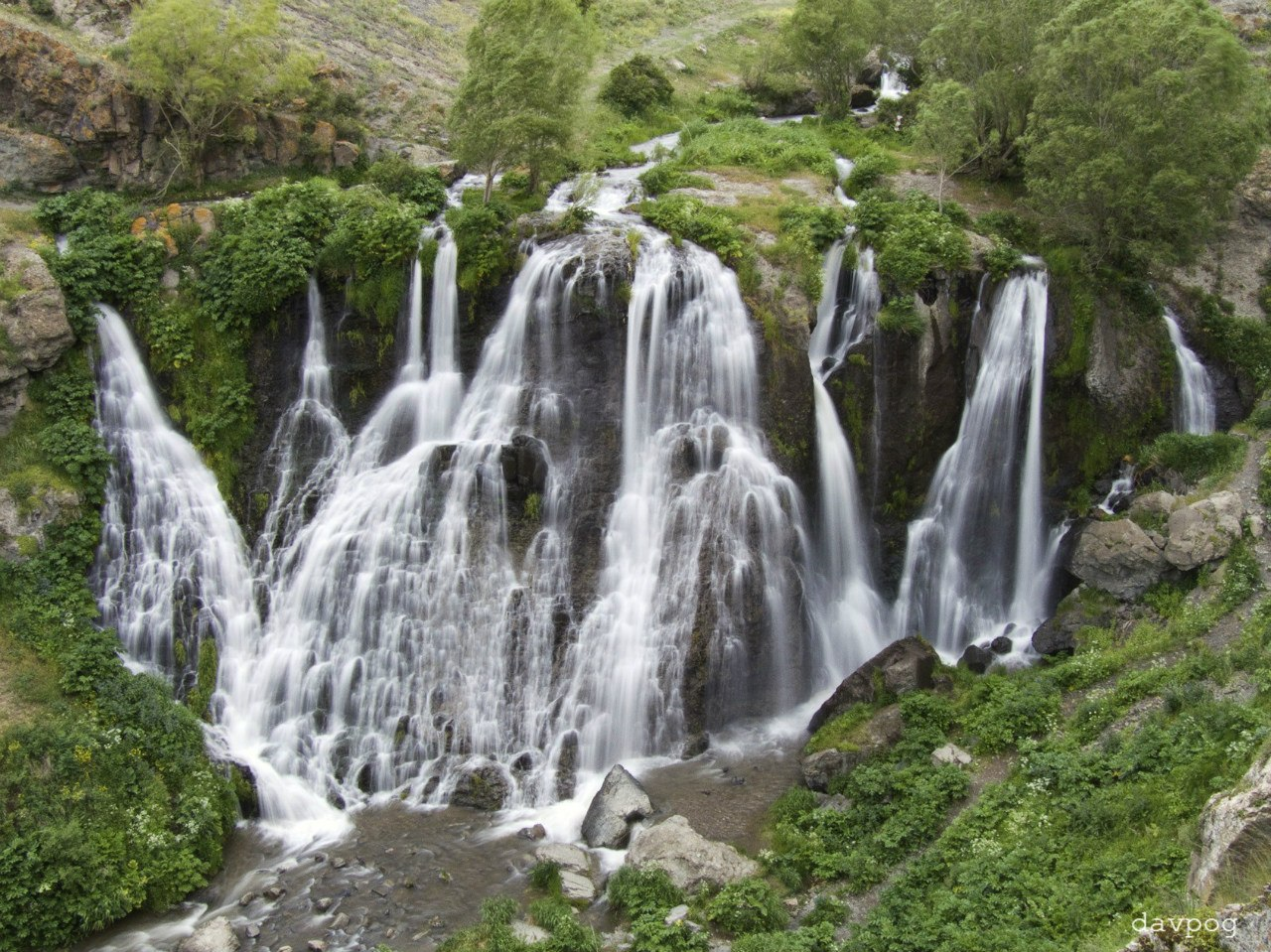

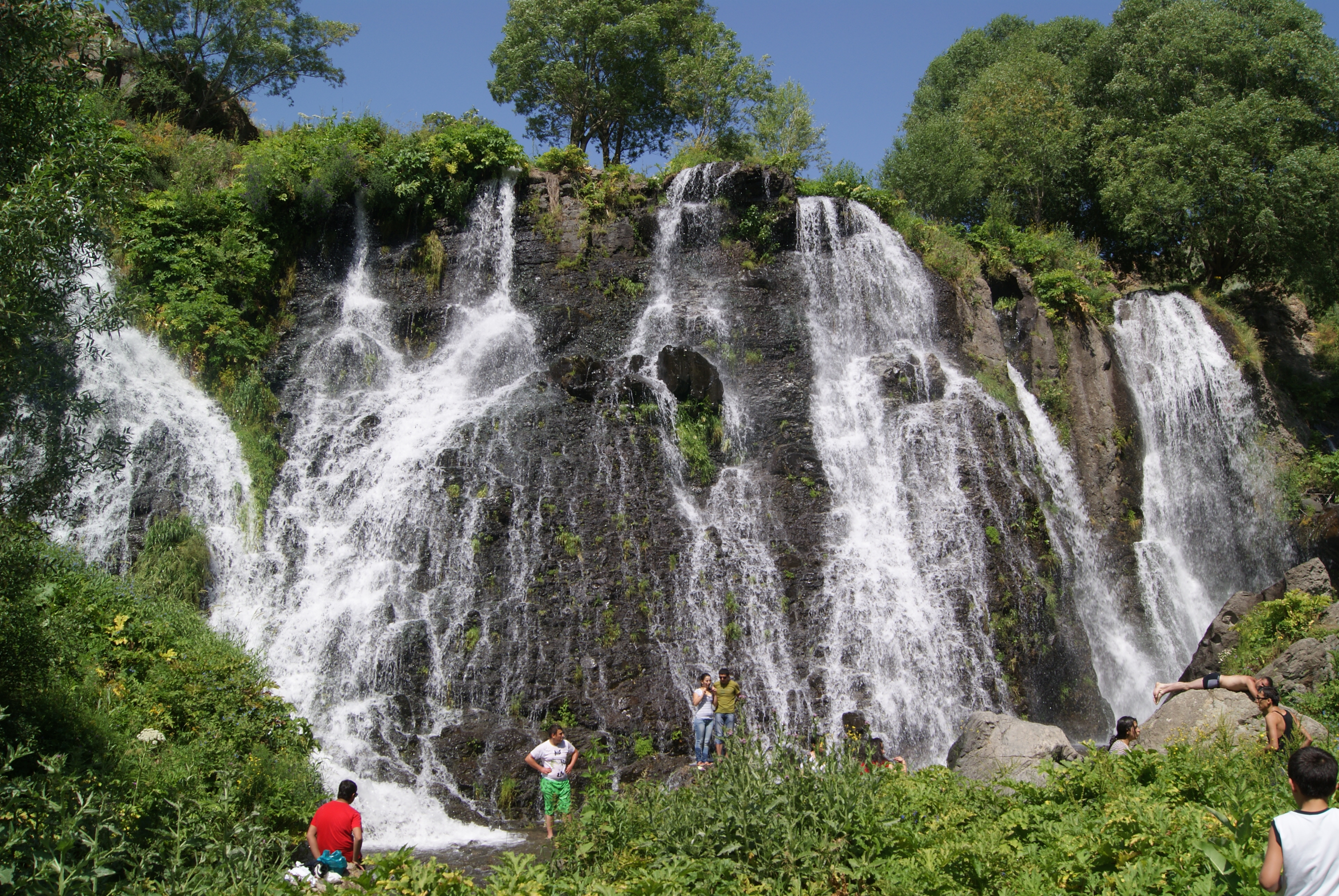

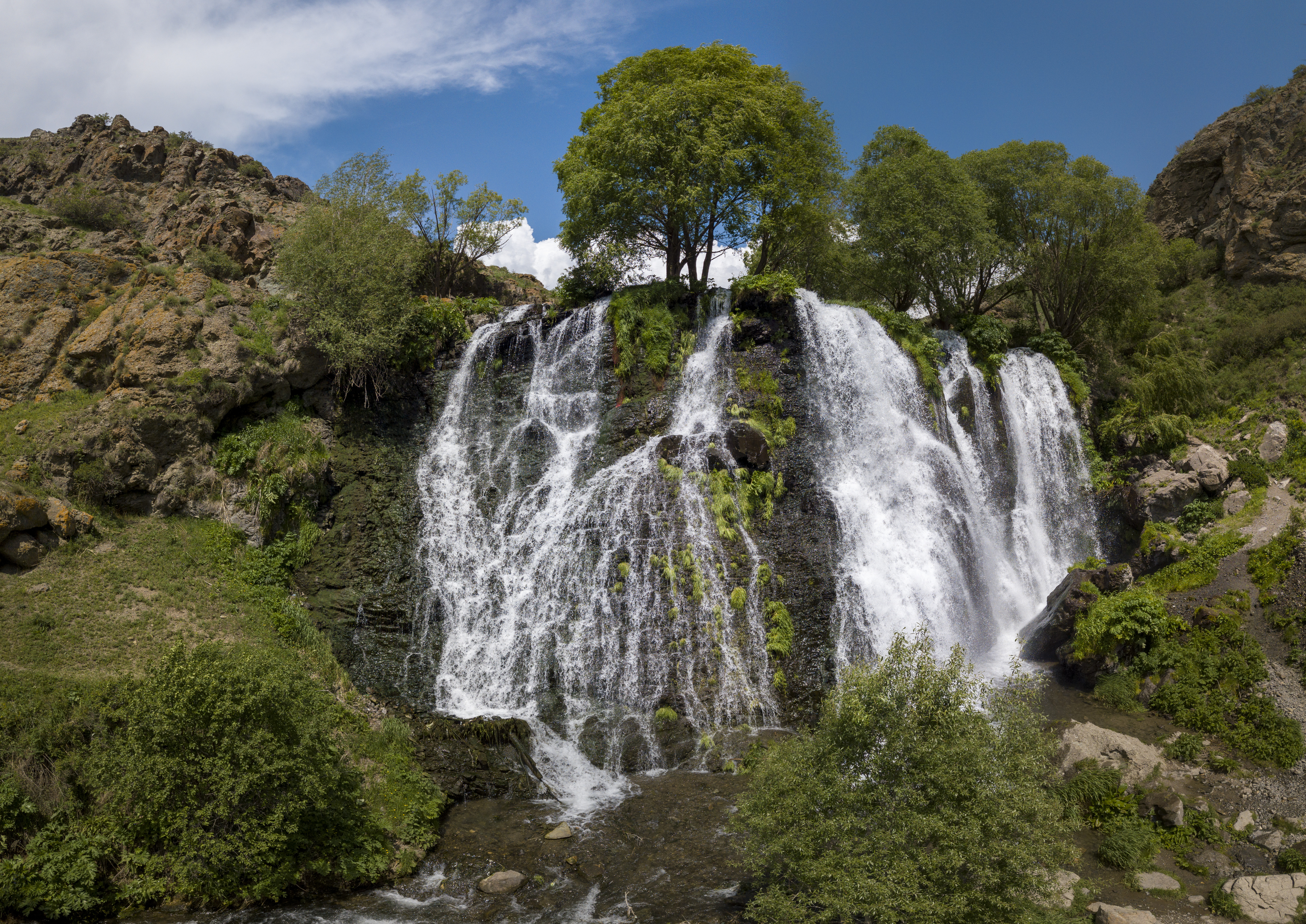

== See also ==
- List of waterfalls
- Geography of Armenia
