= Armash Important Bird Area =

Nature reserve in Armash, Armenia

- Armash Fishponds
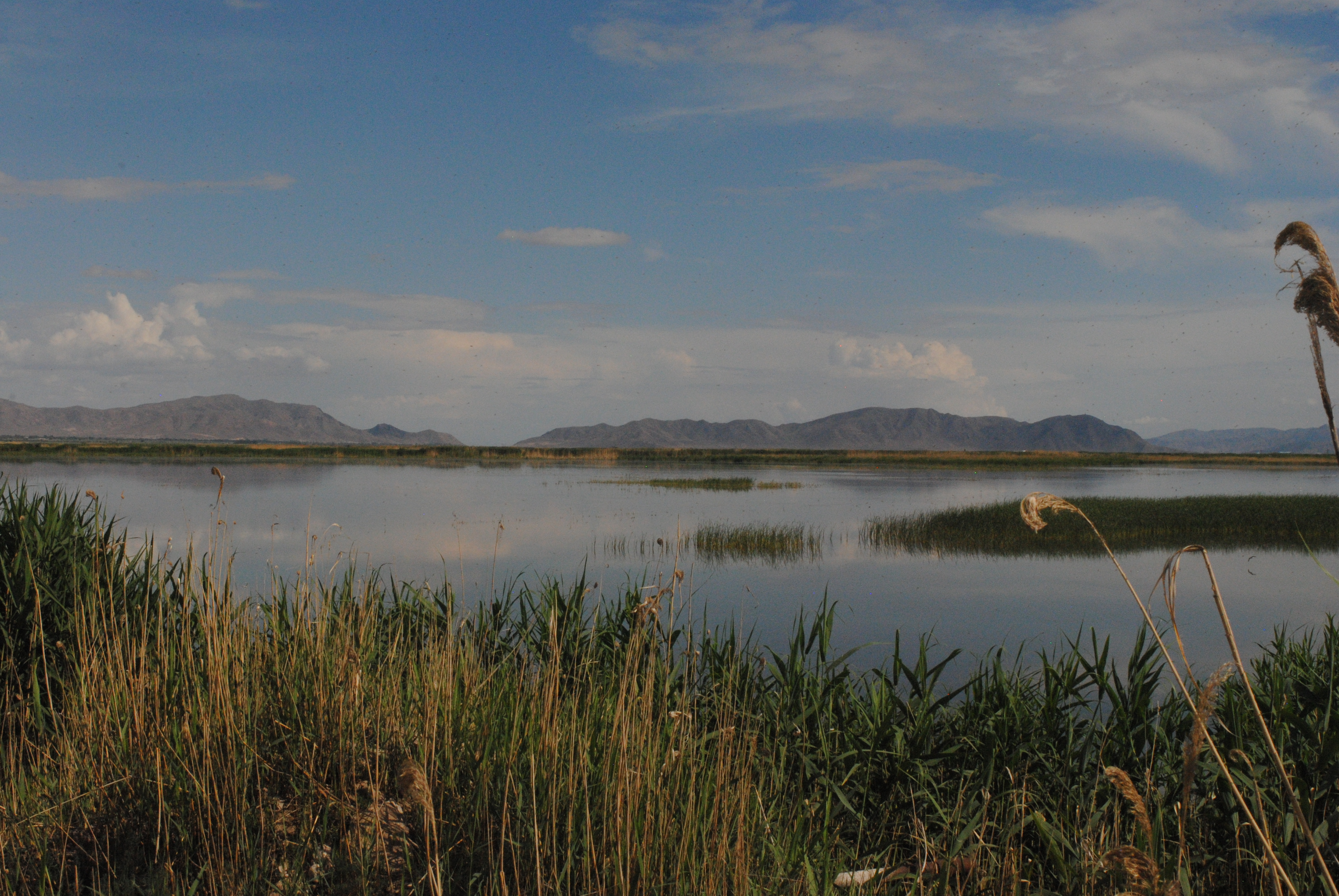
- Interactive map of Armash Important Bird Area
- Nearest town: Armash
- Coordinates: 39.76030°N 44.77036°E
- Area: 4,639 hectares (11,460 acres)
- Owner: Mixed, mostly private
- Designation: Emerald
- Facilities: none

The Armash Important Bird Area (also known as Armash Fishponds) is an area of wetland near the town of Armash, in Armenia, in the foothills of Mount Ararat. This location is on the border with Turkey, Iran and Nakhchivan (an exclave of Azerbaijan). It is designated as an "Emerald Site" wildlife refuge since 2016. The 4,639 ha. site includes 1,514 ha. of ponds used for farming carp, fed by artesian wells and an irrigation canal from the Araks River.

234 bird species have been recorded to dwell on this site, with 93 species of them breeding. It is the only place in Armenia where White-headed Duck, White-tailed Lapwing, and Kentish Plover have been recorded to breed. Other notable species present include Marbled Teal, Common Pochard, Ferruginous Duck, Northern Lapwing, Black-tailed Godwit, Turtle Dove, and Pallid Harrier, all of which are globally threatened, as well as Savi's Warbler, Glossy Ibis, Purple Heron, Squacco Heron, White-winged Tern, Blue-cheeked Bee-eater, Hoopoe, Mediterranean short-toed lark, and European Roller.

It is considered one of the eighteen Important Bird Areas in Armenia.
