= Gorayk =

Gorayk Գորայք
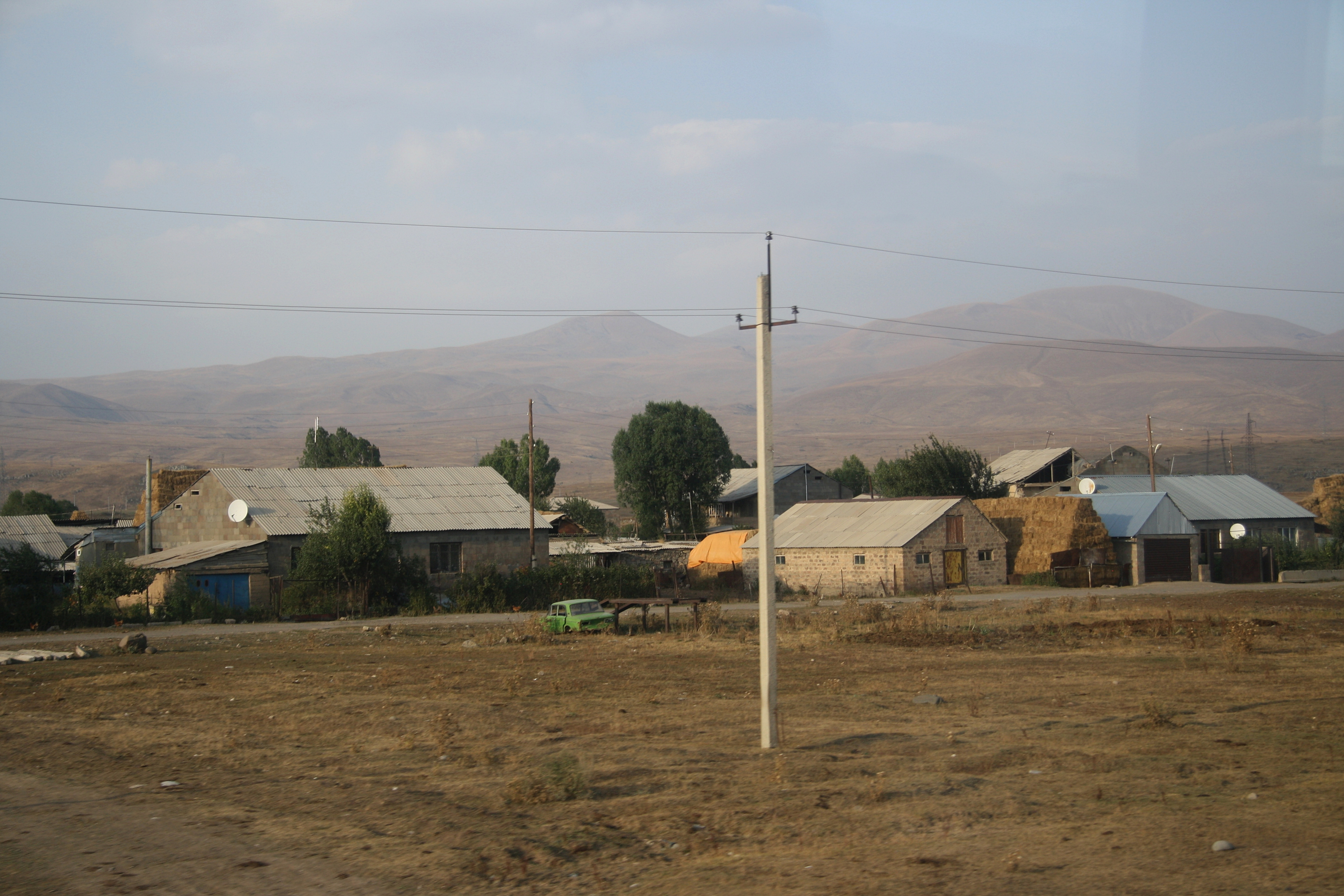

- Location within Armenia Location within Syunik Province
- Coordinates: 39°40′58″N 45°45′41″E
- Country: Armenia
- Province: Syunik
- Municipality: Sisian

Area
  - Total: 67.57 km^{2} (26.09 sq mi)

Population (2011)
  - Total: 435
  - Density: 6.44/km^{2} (16.7/sq mi)
- Time zone: UTC+4 (AMT)

Gorayk (Armenian: Գորայք) is a village in Sisian Municipality of the Syunik Province in Armenia. A large reservoir called the Spandaryan Reservoir lies to the southeast of the village.

== Toponymy ==
The village was previously known as Bazarchay.

== Demographics ==
The Statistical Committee of Armenia reported the village population as 580 in 2010, down from 632 at the 2001 census.

== Gallery ==
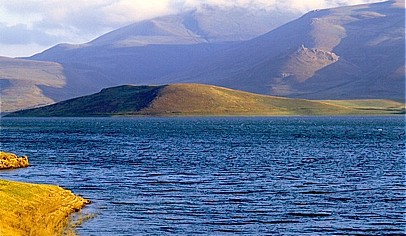
Spandarian Reservoir

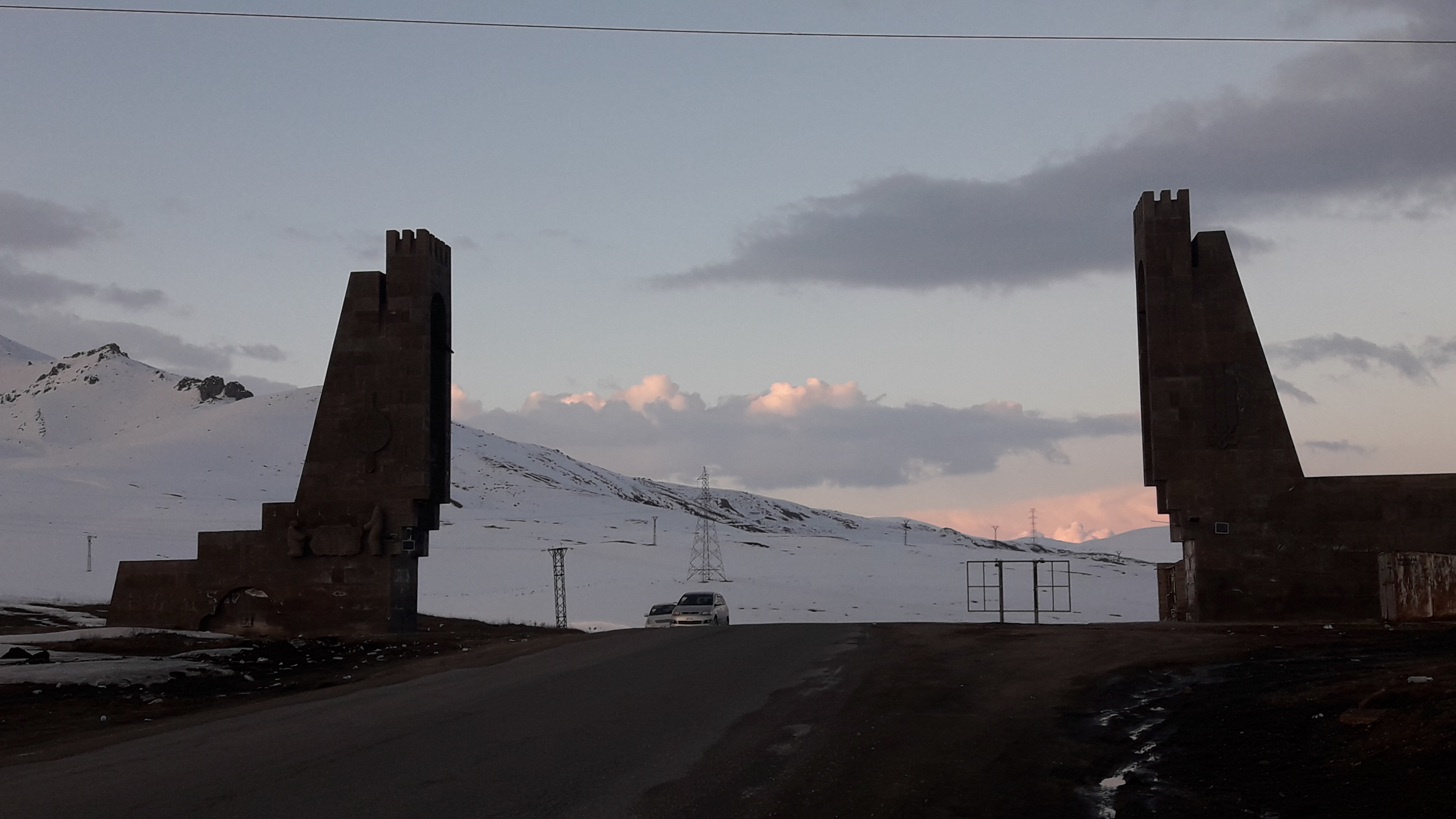
"Zangezur Gates"

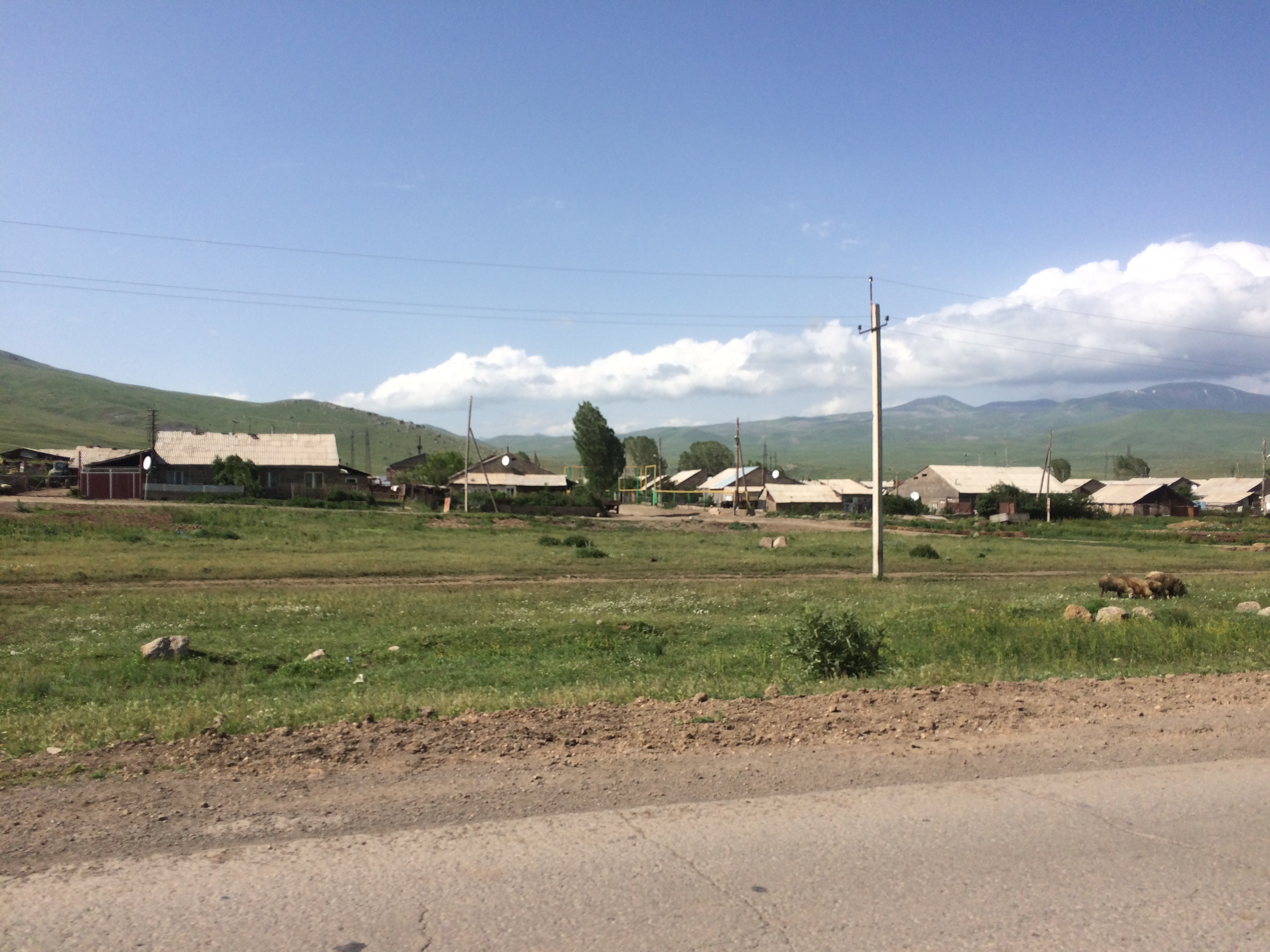
A view of the village

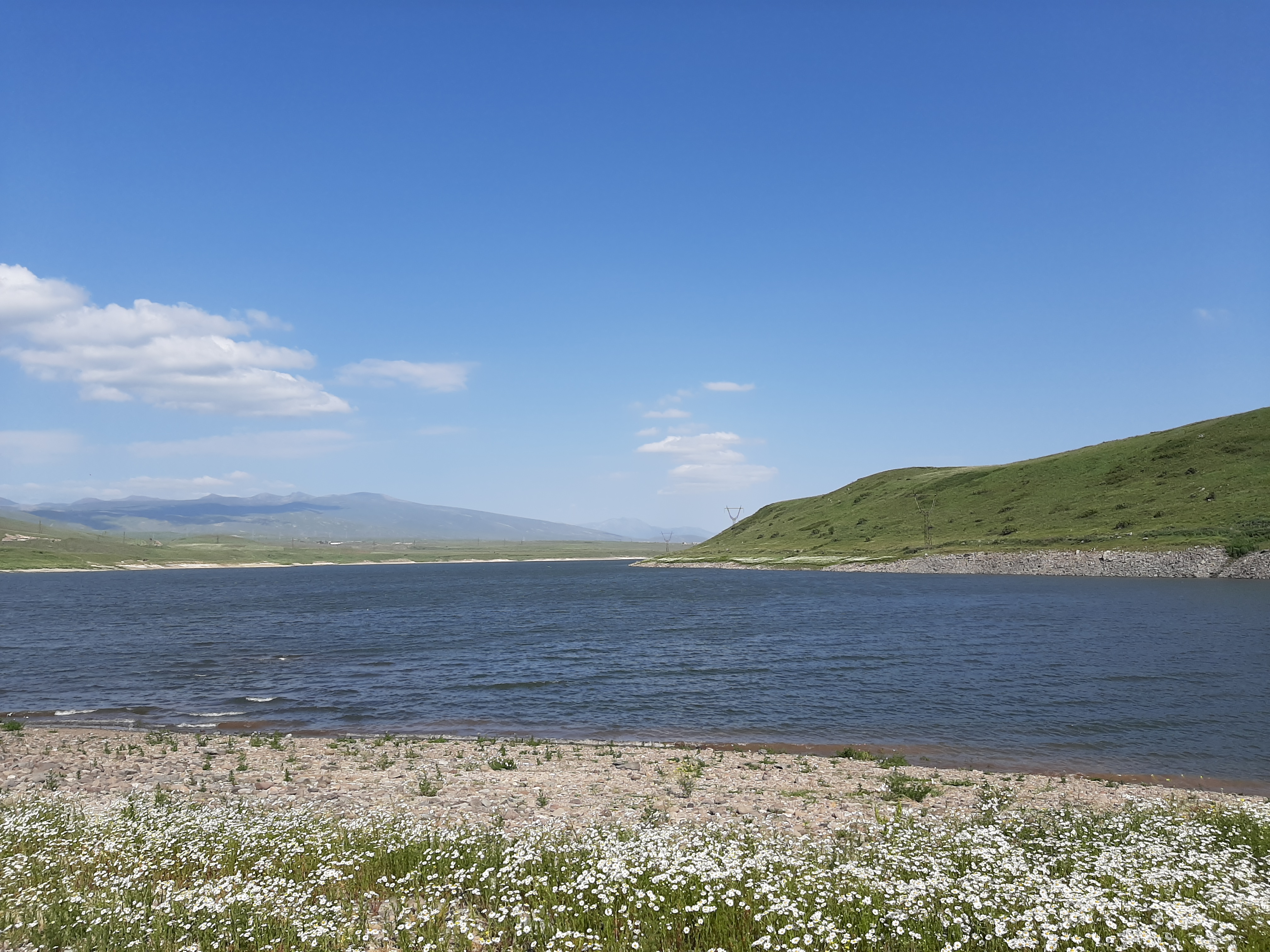
Spandarian Reservoir

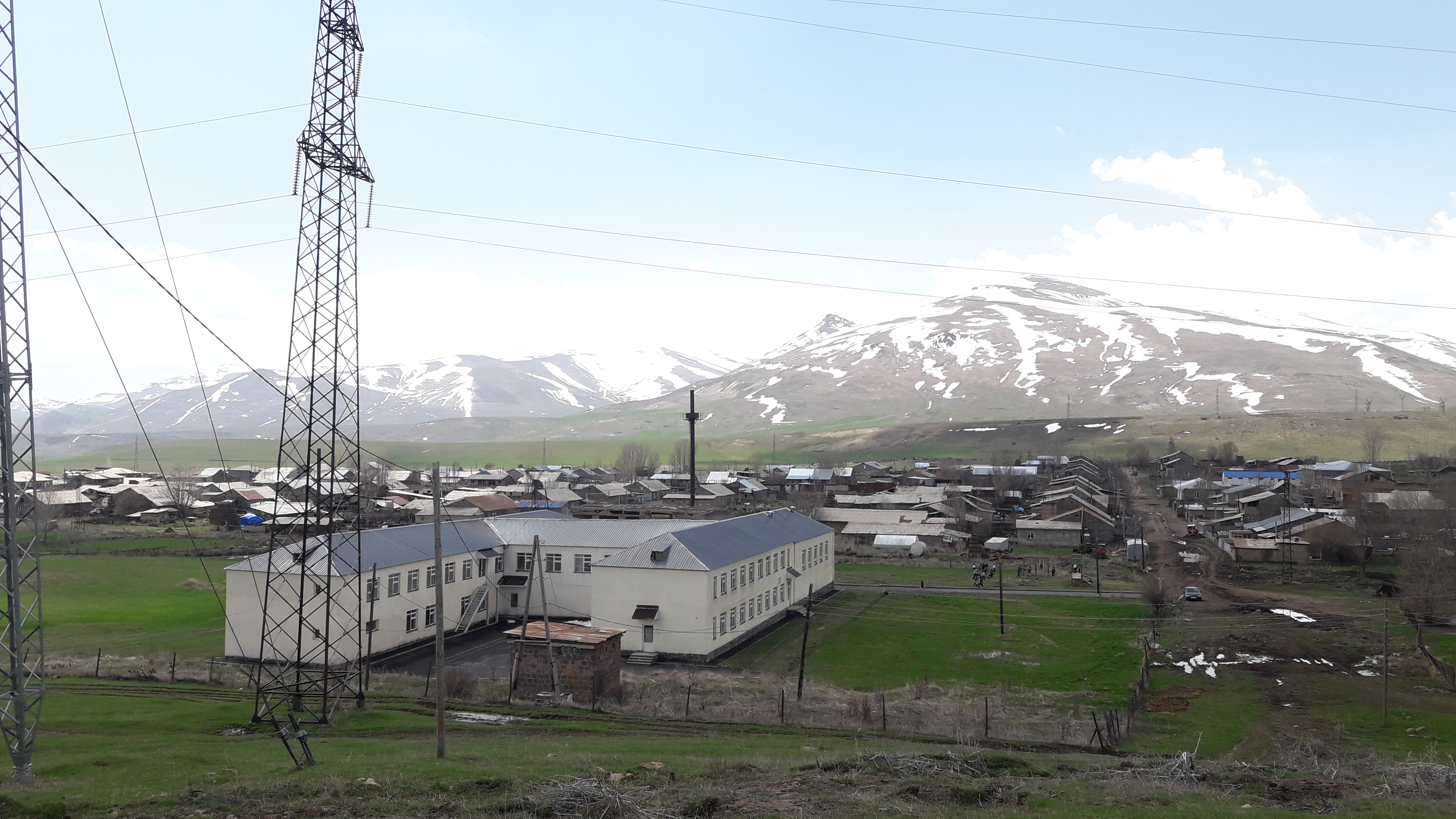
A view of the village
