= Les vêpres siciliennes discography =

Recordings of the opera by Giuseppe Verdi

This is a list of audio and video recordings (discography) of Giuseppe Verdi's 1855 French grand opera in five acts, Les vêpres siciliennes (The Sicilian Vespers). The opera is frequently performed in Italian translation as I vespri siciliani. As is typical of French grand opera, it includes a lengthy ballet in act 3 (Les quatres saisons). Since the ballet is about 30 minutes long and has a scenario unrelated to the plot of the opera, it is usually omitted in live performances.

== Audio recordings in French ==
Year	Cast: (Hélène, Henri, Montfort, Procida)	Conductor, Opera House and Orchestra	Label
1969	Jacqueline Brumaire, Jean Bonhomme, Neilson Taylor, Ayhan Baran	Mario Rossi, BBC Concert Orchestra, BBC Chorus (Recorded 10 May, Camden Theatre, London; first broadcast 15 February 1970; Ashley Lawrence conducted the music for the ballet)	CD: Opera Rara; Cat: ORCV303
2003	Nelly Miricioiu, Marcello Giordani, Anthony Michaels-Moore, Ferruccio Furlanetto	James Conlon, Paris Opera Orchestra & Chorus (Recorded live, 27 June, Opéra Bastille; ballet omitted)	CD: Celestial Audio, Cat: CA 452

== Video recordings in French ==
Year	Cast: (Hélène, Henri, Montfort, Procida)	Conductor, Opera House and Orchestra	Label
2010	Barbara Haveman, Burkhard Fritz, Alejandro Marco-Buhrmester, Balint Szabo	Paolo Carignani, Netherlands Philharmonic Orchestra, Chorus of the Netherlands Opera (Performed on 23 and 29 September; stage direction by Christof Loy; ballet abridged)	Blu-ray/DVD: Opus Arte; Cat: 1060D
2013	Lianna Haroutounian, Bryan Hymel, Michael Volle, Erwin Schrott	Antonio Pappano, Orchestra and Chorus of the Royal Opera (Performed in October; stage direction by Stefan Herheim; ballet omitted)	Blu-ray/DVD: Opus Arte

== Audio recordings in Italian ==
Year	Cast: (Elena, Arrigo, Monforte, Procida)	Conductor, Opera House and Orchestra	Label
1951	Maria Callas, Giórgios Kokoliós-Bardi, Enzo Mascherini, Boris Christoff	Erich Kleiber, Chorus and Orchestra of the Maggio Musicale Fiorentino (Recorded live, 26 May; includes the ballet)	CD: Warner Classics; Cat: 0190295844516
1955	Anita Cerquetti, Mario Ortica, Carlo Tagliabue, Boris Christoff	Mario Rossi, RAI Torino Chorus and Orchestra (Recorded 9 October; broadcast 16 November; ballet omitted)	CD: Walhall Eternity Series; Cat: WLCD 0108
1973	Martina Arroyo, Plácido Domingo, Sherrill Milnes, Ruggero Raimondi	James Levine, New Philharmonia Orchestra, John Alldis Choir (includes the ballet)	CD: RCA Victor Red seal Cat: RCA 63492-2
1990	Cheryl Studer, Chris Merritt, Giorgio Zancanaro, Ferruccio Furlanetto	Riccardo Muti, Teatro alla Scala (Recorded live, December 1989 & January 1990; includes the ballet)	CD: EMI; Cat: CDS 7 54043-2 (video below)
2004	Sondra Radvanovsky, Francisco Casanova, Leo Nucci, Samuel Ramey	Frédéric Chaslin, Metropolitan Opera Orchestra & Chorus (Recorded live, 11 December; ballet omitted)	Apple Music, iTunes Store, Met Opera on Demand

== Video recordings in Italian ==
Year	Cast: (Elena, Arrigo, Monforte, Procida)	Conductor, Opera House and Orchestra	Label
1986	Susan Dunn, Veriano Luchetti, Leo Nucci, Bonaldo Giaiotti	Riccardo Chailly, Teatro Comunale di Bologna Orchestra & Chorus (Producer: Luca Ronconi; recorded live, 9, 12 & 15 February; ballet omitted)	DVD: NVC Arts, Kultur Video
1989	Cheryl Studer, Chris Merritt, Giorgio Zancanaro, Ferruccio Furlanetto	Riccardo Muti, Teatro alla Scala Orchestra & Chorus (Stage director: Pier Luigi Pizzi; recorded live by RAI Television, 7 December; includes the ballet, with dancers Carla Fracci and Wayne Eagling)	DVD: Opus Arte; Cat: OALS3008D (audio above)
2003	Amarilli Nizza, Renzo Zulian, Vladimir Stoyanov, Orlin Anastassov	Stefano Ranzani, Orchestra & Chorus of Fondazione Arturo Toscanini (Production: Pier Luigi Pizzi; recorded live, February, Teatro Verdi, Busseto; ballet omitted)	DVD: Dynamic; Cat:33551
2010	Daniela Dessì, Fabio Armiliato, Leo Nucci, Giacomo Prestia	Massimo Zanetti, Teatro Regio di Parma Orchestra & Chorus (Production: Pier Luigi Pizzi; recorded live, 13 & 17 October; ballet omitted)	Blu-ray/DVD: C Major; Cat:723904

== Audio recording in German ==
Year	Cast: (Elena, Arrigo, Monforte, Procida)	Conductor, Opera House and Orchestra	Label
1951	Maud Cunitz, Helge Rosvaenge, Heinrich Schlusnus, Otto von Rohr	Kurt Schröder, Frankfurt Radio Symphony Orchestra, Chor des Hessischen Rundfunks (Radio recording of 12 February 1951)	LP: DGG; Cat: LPEM 19244/46
