= Metsamor =

City in Armavir, Armenia

Metsamor Մեծամոր
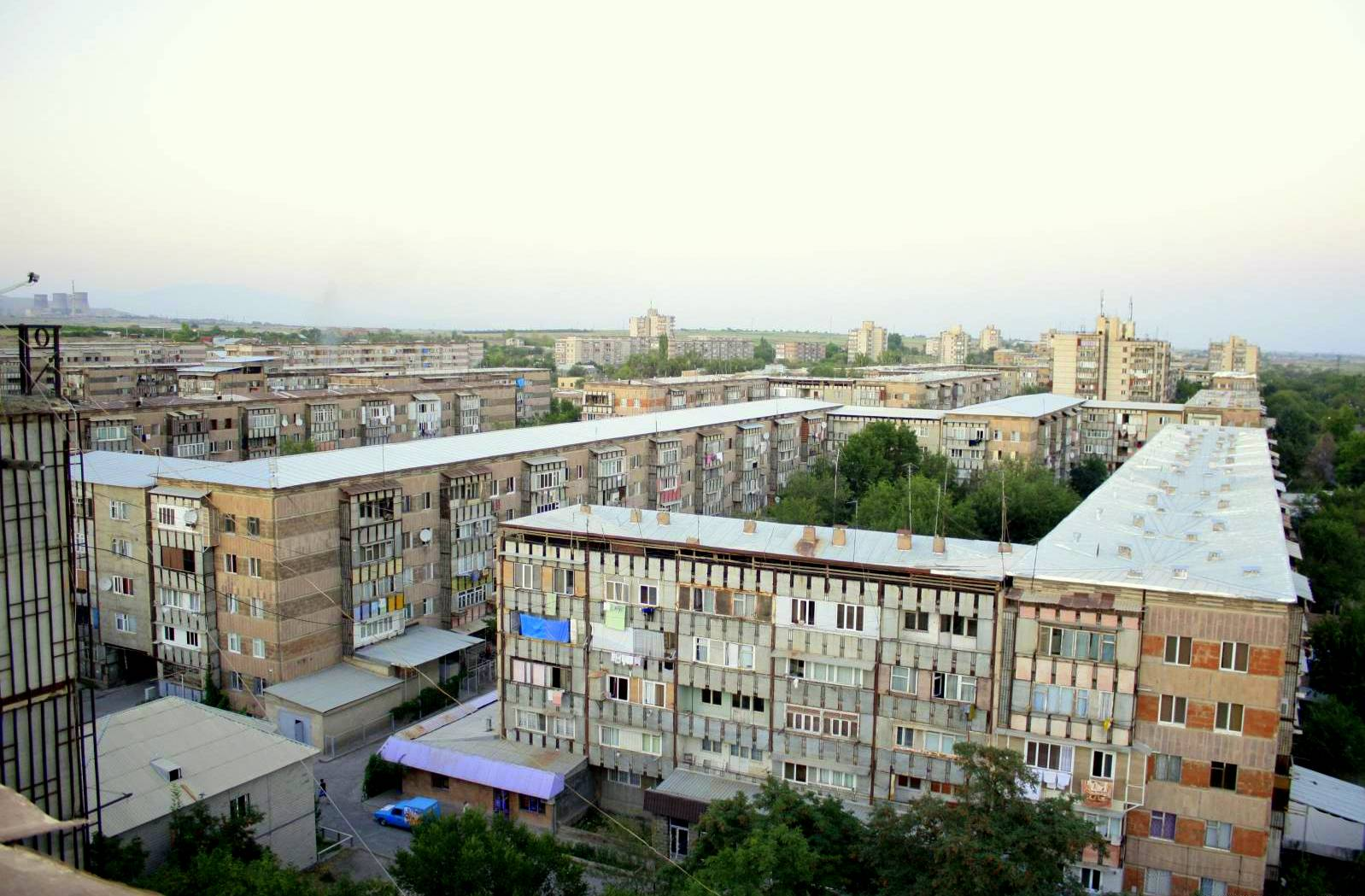
- Metsamor

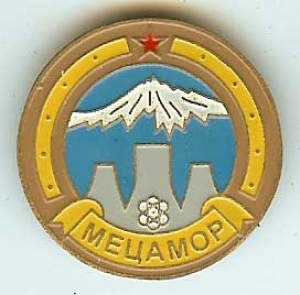
- Coat of arms

- Location within Armenia
- Coordinates: 40°08′34″N 44°06′59″E
- Country: Armenia
- Marz (Province): Armavir
- Founded: 1969

Area
  - Total: 9.12 km^{2} (3.52 sq mi)
- Elevation: 855 m (2,805 ft)

Population (2022 census)
  - Total: 8,472
  - Density: 929/km^{2} (2,410/sq mi)
- Time zone: UTC+4

Metsamor (Armenian: Մեծամոր, Armenian pronunciation: [mɛt͡sɑˈmoɾ]), is a city and urban municipal community in the Armavir Province of Armenia. It is famous for being home to Armenia's Metsamor Nuclear Power Plant, the only nuclear plant in the Transcaucasian region. As of the 2011 census, the town had a population of 9,191. As per the 2016 official estimate, Metsamor has a population of around 8,000. As of the 2022 census, the town had a population of 8,472.

== Etymology ==
The name of the town is derived from the nearby river of Metsamor. It is composed of 2 Armenian words: mets (Armenian: մեծ) meaning great, and mor (Armenian: մոր) meaning mother's, being the genitive singular form of the word mayr (Armenian: մայր) meaning mother. The name is most probably refers to the Virgin Mary as the Great Mother of God.

== History ==
The construction of the settlement of Metsamor was launched in 1969, within the Hoktemberyan raion of the Armenian Soviet Socialist Republic. It was mainly founded as the residential settlement of the employees of the Metsamor Nuclear Power Plant. The residential district was completed in 1972, and given the status of an urban-type settlement. The construction of the town was designed by the chief architect Martin Mikayelyan, assisted by architects G. Hovsepyan and K. Tiraturyan. It was first known as the Residential settlement of the Armenian nuclear power plant until 1972 when it was renamed Metsamor after the nearby river.

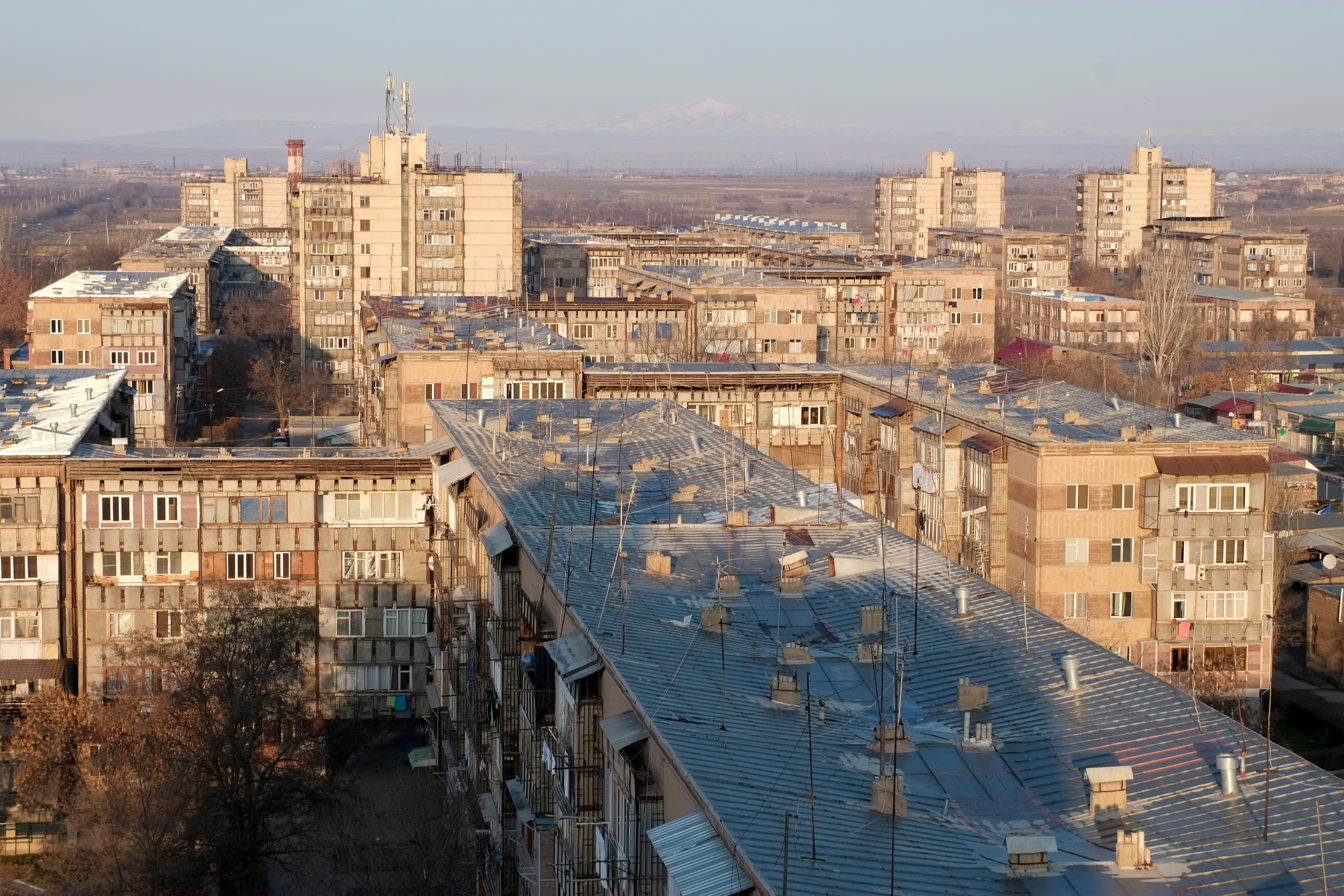
Metsamor

The construction of the nuclear power plant was launched in 1969. Unit 1 plant was commissioned on December 22, 1976, while unit 2 was commissioned on January 5, 1980. However, it was temporarily closed in 1989 after the 1988 Armenian earthquake for environmental reasons. Energy shortages caused by its closure forced the Armenian government to reopen the plant in 1993. Unit 2 reactor was brought back into operation on October 26, 1995. Nowadays, the Metsamor plant generates 40% of Armenia's energy needs. The plant was heavily modernized and redeveloped between 2003 and 2015. The construction of a 3rd unit is planned to replace the old reactors by 2026.

Following the independence of Armenia in 1991, Metsamor retained its status as an urban settlement within the newly formed Armavir Province, as per the 1995 administrative reforms.

== Geography ==
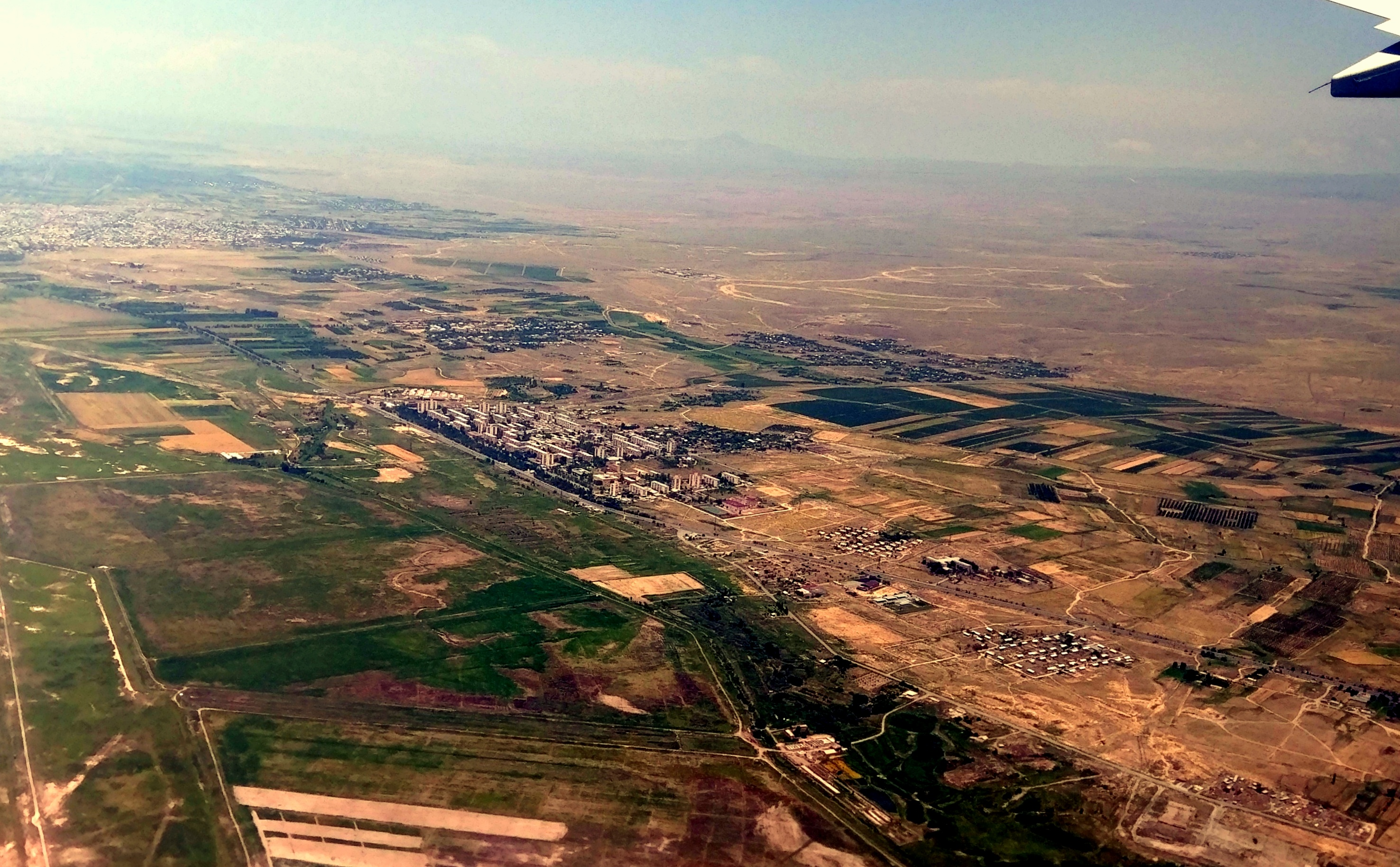
Aerial view of Metsamor situated in the Ararat Plain

Metsamor is located at the west of central Armenia in the Ararat Plain, at an average height of 855 meters above sea level. Surrounded with fertile farms of grapes, the town is at a road distance of 35 km west of the capital Yerevan and 6 km east of the provincial centre Armavir. The nuclear power plant is located around 4 km north of the residential area of the town.

According to the major urban plan, the residential area of the town is divided into 3 districts, with the central district being home to the town hall, the central park, the cultural house, the post office, along with other service and municipal buildings.

== Demographics ==
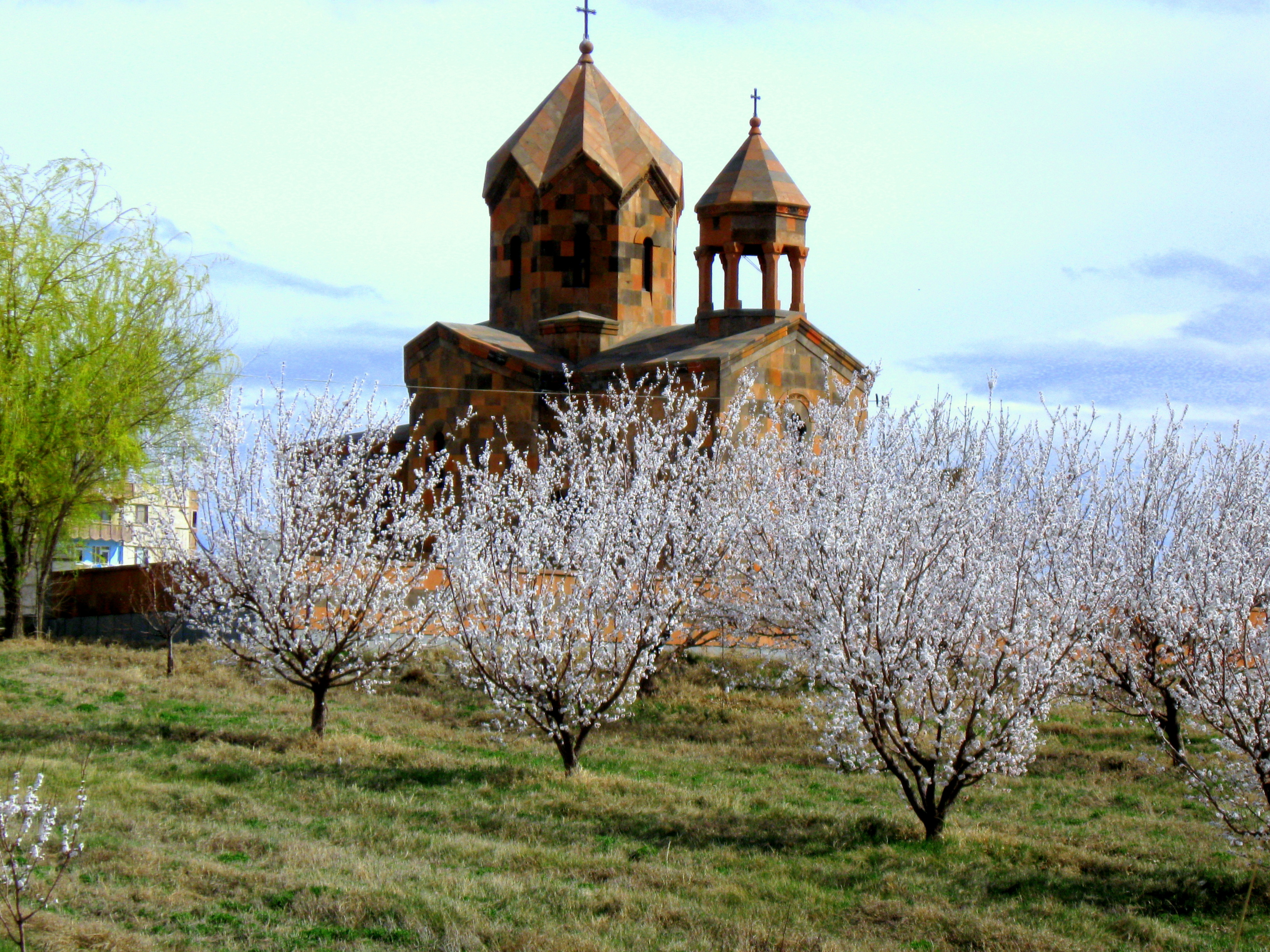
Saint Lazarus Church

Armenian Apostolic Church is the predominant religion in Metsamor. The town's Saint Lazarus Church (built in 2002–05) was opened in 2005 through donations from the US-based Armenian benefactors Zaven and Azatuhi Dadekian. The church is regulated by the Diocese of Armavir based in the nearby town of Armavir.

Historical population
Year	Pop.	±% p.a.
1975	4,450	—
1981	8,185	+10.69%
1989	11,959	+4.85%
1991	11,300	−2.79%
2001	9,870	−1.34%
2011	9,191	−0.71%
2022	8,472	−0.74%

== Culture ==
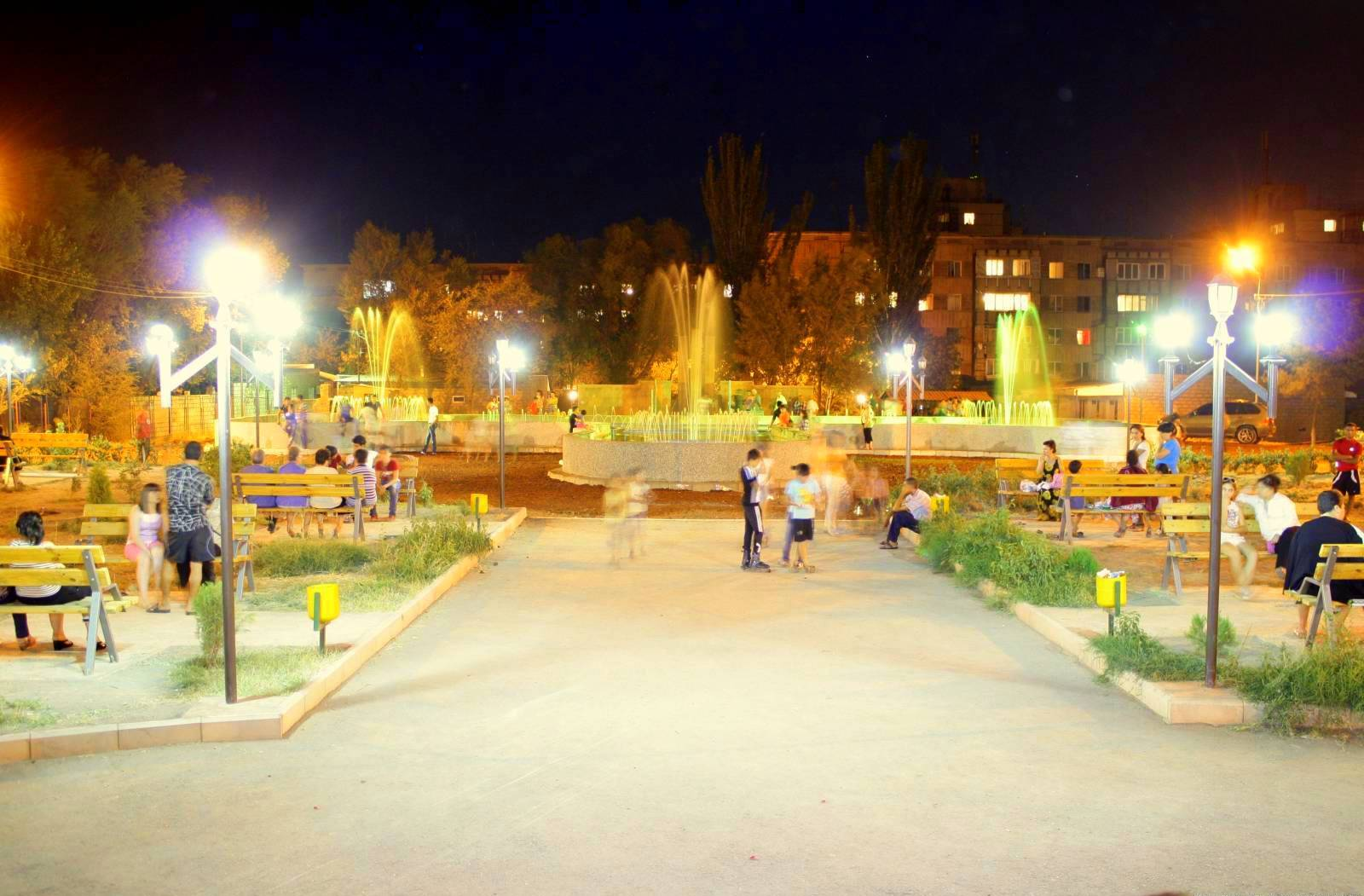
Metsamor central park

The archaeological site of ancient Metsamor is located about 4 km southeast of the town, near the village of Taronik. The site been populated starting from the 5th millennium BC until the 18th century AD, based on excavations conducted in 1965. Neolithic stone circles dating back to ca. 5000 BC stand within the historical site.

Currently, the town of Metsamor is home to a cultural house, a public library, as well as a school of music.

== Transportation ==
Metsamor is located on the M-5 Motorway that connects Yerevan and Vagharshapat at the east with Armavir town and the northwestern Armenia-Turkey borderline near the village of Bagaran. Metsamor is also connected with the surrounding villages via a network of regional roads. Mini bus vans facilitate the transport between the town and the nearby urban settlements, including the capital Yerevan.

== Economy ==
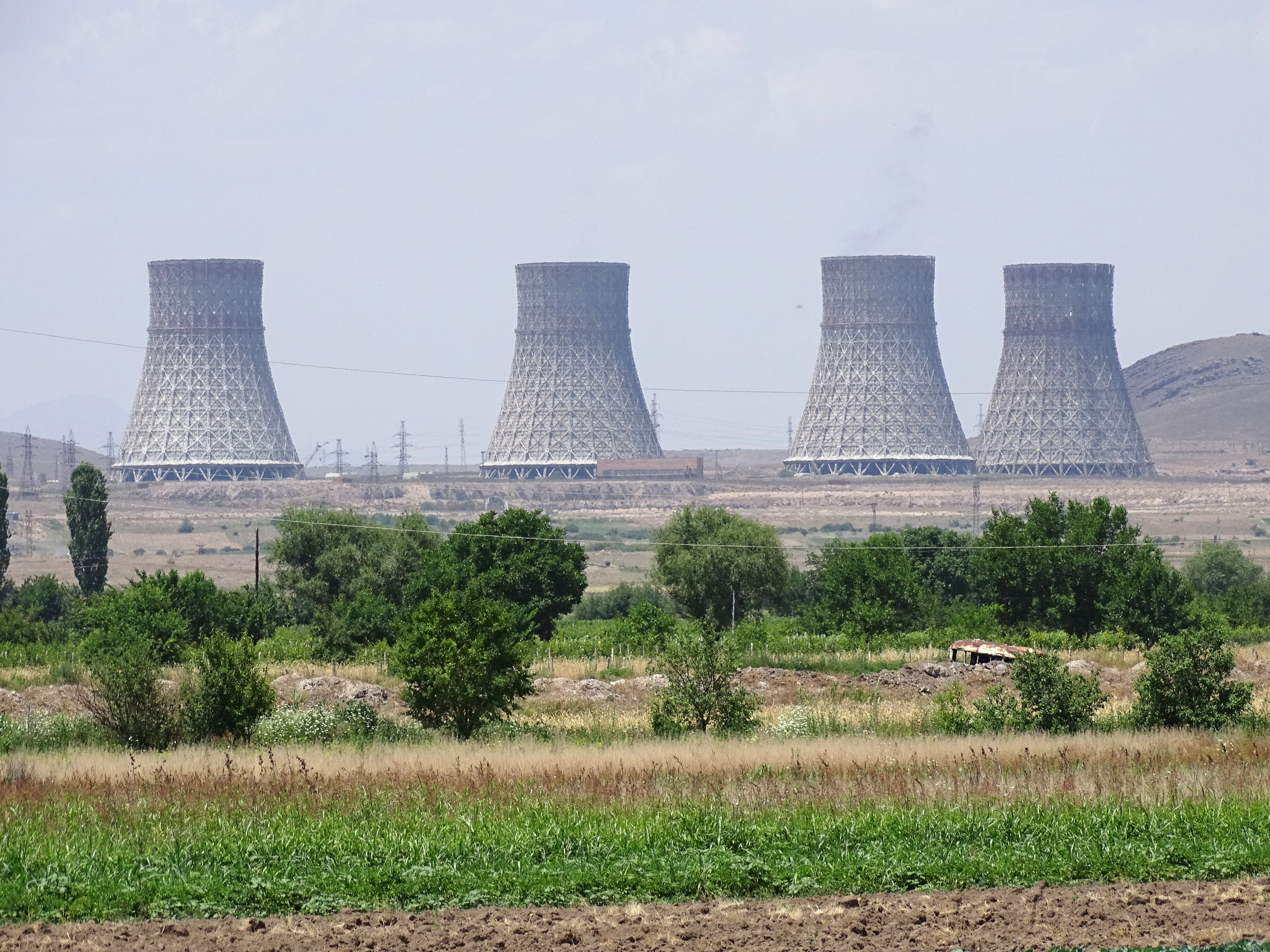
Metsamor Nuclear Power Plant

Metsamor is a major center of energy in Armenia. The economy of the town is solely based on the operation of the Metsamor Nuclear Power Plant, providing 40% of the country's electricity (as of 2015).

Being situated in the fertile Ararat plain, many of the Metsamor citizens are involved in agriculture. The town is surrounded with grape farms, something that greatly contributes in the development of wine-making in the town.

== Education ==
Metsamor is home to 2 public education schools as well as many pre-school kindergartens. In 1972, the town's first school named after Saint Gregory of Narek was opened. The second school of the town was opened in 1986 and moved to its new building in 1996.

== Sport ==
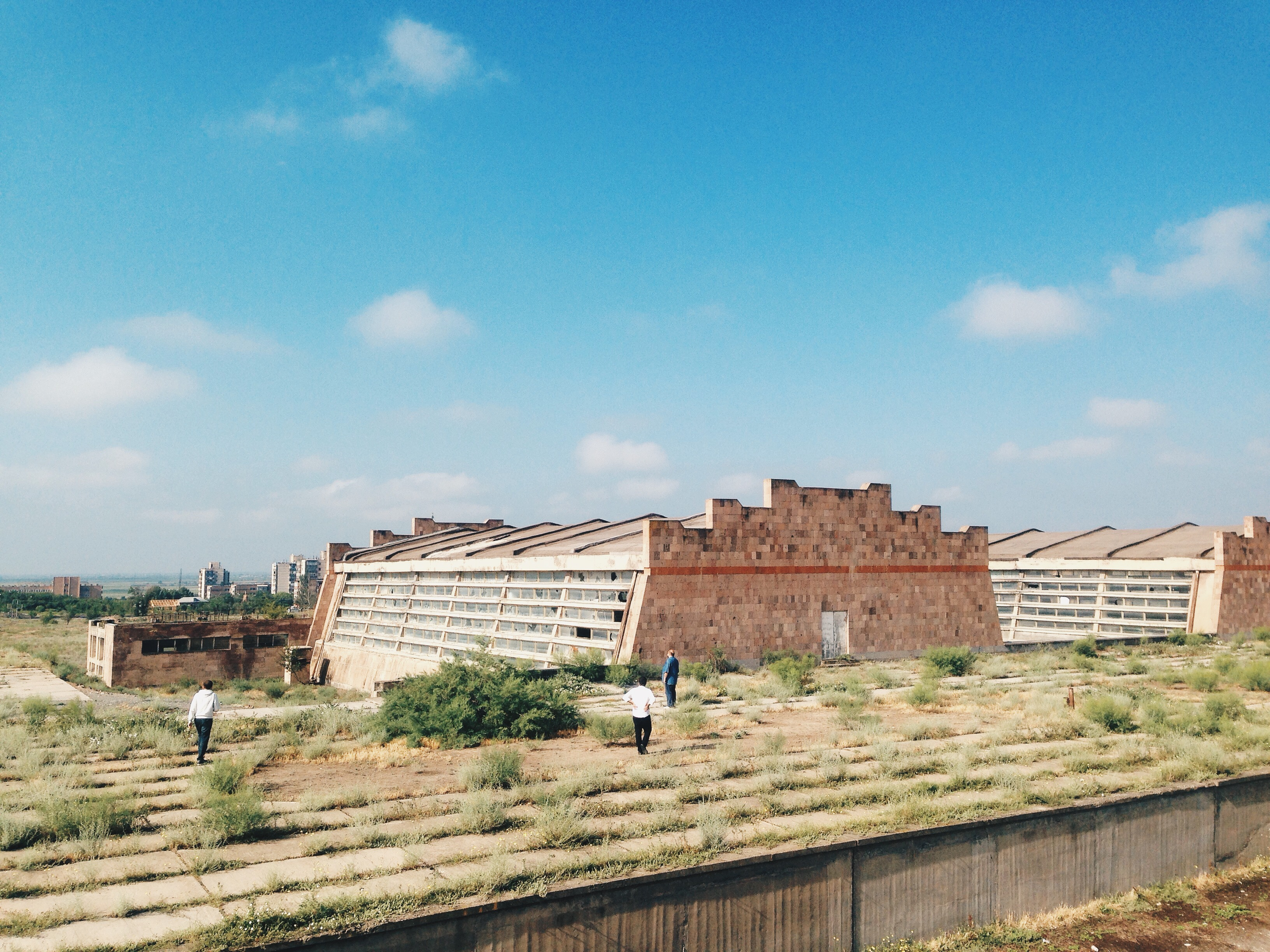
The sports complex

Metsamor is home to a large sports complex opened in 1980, including 2 swimming pools and indoor sports halls. The Metsamor sports school, run by the municipality since 2008, is housed in the complex, with youth teams of football, volleyball, basketball, wrestling, weightlifting, kick-boxing, karate and athletics. However, the complex has never been renovated since its inauguration.

== Notable people ==
- Mardjan Avetisyan, renowned actress
- Lianna Haroutounian, opera singer

== See also ==
- Metsamor Castle
- Metsamor (village)
- Metsamor Nuclear Power Plant
