= Zoboli =

Zoboli is an Italian surname. Notable people with the surname include:

- Davide Zoboli (born 1981), Italian footballer
- Giovanna Zoboli (born 1962), Italian writer
- Giovanni Zoboli (1821–1884), Italian composer
- Jacopo Zoboli (1681–1767), Italian painter
- Omar Zoboli (born 1953), Italian professor
- Vittorio Zoboli (born 1968), Italian racing driver
