= Liber Jani de Procida et Palialoco =

The Liber Jani de Procida et Palialoco ("Book of John of Procida and Palaeologus") is a medieval Tuscan history of the Sicilian Vespers. It focusses on the conspiratorial role played by John of Procida, cast as the villain. It was almost certainly written in Tuscany and is often considered synoptic with the Leggenda di Messer Gianni di Procida, written by a Modenese Guelf. The contemporaneous Sicilian Rebellamentu di Sichilia portrays John as a hero. Both Tuscan versions are later than the Sicilian, but may share the Reballamentu as a source. Conversely, all three may derive from an earlier, now lost source. All three agree on the centrality of John of Procida in the Vespers. The Liber emphasises his connexion with Michael VIII Palaeologus, the Byzantine emperor.

The famous story of the provocation of the Vespers through the rape of a Sicilian woman by a French soldier is contained within the Rebellamentu and La vinuta di lu re Iapicu in Catania, the other Sicilian chronicle by Atanasiu di Iaci. The Liber Jani has a similar story, but in it the woman turns a knife on the Frenchman and his comrades come to his aid. The Liber is preserved in a Vatican manuscript and is published by Lodovico Antonio Muratori in his Raccolta degli storici Italiani, XXXIV.43–78.

== Online editions ==
- Vincenzo di Giovanni (1871), "Liber Yani de Procita et Paliologo," Filologia e letteratura siciliana: studii (Palermo: L. P. Lauriel), 52–94.
