= I vespri siciliani =

Opera by Giuseppe Verdi

- Opera by Giuseppe Verdi
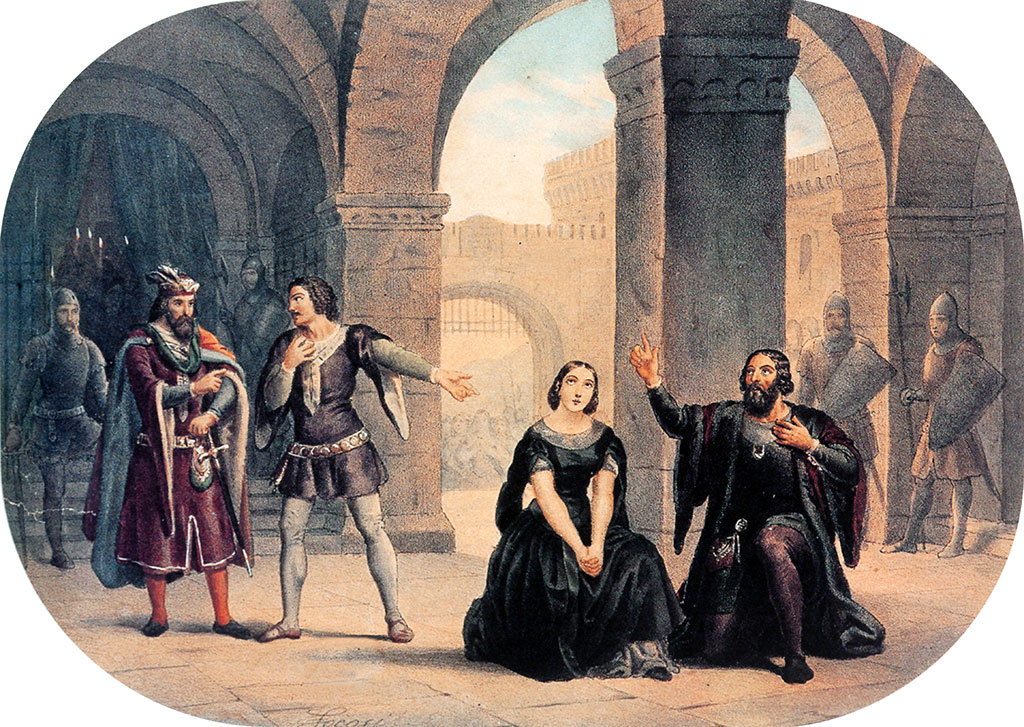
- Scene from the opera (Lithograph by Roberto Focosi)
- Librettist: Eugène Scribe; Charles Duveyrier
- Language: Italian
- Based on: Original 1838 libretto for Donizetti's Le duc d'Albe
- Premiere: 26 December 1855; Teatro Regio, Parma

I vespri siciliani (Italian pronunciation: [i ˈvɛspri sitʃiˈljaːni]; "The Sicilian Vespers") is a five-act Italian opera originally written in French for the Paris Opéra by the Italian romantic composer Giuseppe Verdi and translated into Italian shortly after its premiere in June 1855.

Under its original title, Les vêpres siciliennes, the libretto was prepared by Eugène Scribe and Charles Duveyrier from their work Le duc d'Albe, which was written in 1838 and offered to Halévy and Donizetti before Verdi agreed to set it to music in 1854.

The story is loosely based on a historical event, the Sicilian Vespers of 1282, using material drawn from the medieval Sicilian tract Lu rebellamentu di Sichilia.

After its June 1855 Paris premiere, an Italian libretto was quickly prepared using a new title because Verdi realized that it would have been impossible to place the story in Sicily. Based on Scribe's suggestions for changing the location, it became Portugal in 1640 while under Spanish control. This version was first performed at the Teatro Regio in Parma on 26 December 1855.

== Composition history ==
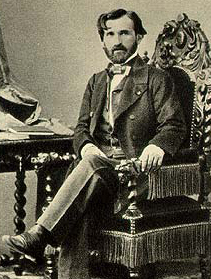
Verdi in 1859

While it was not Verdi's first grand opera for Paris (the first being his adaptation of I Lombardi in 1847 under the new title of Jerusalem), the libretto which Verdi was using had been written about 20 years before at the height of the French grand opera tradition, which "meant that Verdi was writing his first (original) opéra at a point at which the genre was in a state of flux".

== Performance history ==
As Les vêpres

It was first performed at the Paris Opéra on 13 June 1855. However, while it was initially successful, the French version never entered the established repertory and performances "limped along" until Verdi attempted to aid its revival at the Paris Opéra on 6 July 1863 by revising some of the roles for selected singers. However, after a few performances, the opera disappeared and was replaced by the French version of Il trovatore, Le trouvère. Except for this one revival in Paris in 1863, "it vanished from the Parisian stage altogether"

== Verdi's Italian language translation ==
An Italian libretto was quickly prepared under Verdi's supervision by the poet Eugenio Caimi. The composer was aware that in Italy at that time, it was not possible to retain the Sicilian location, as he notes to his publisher Giulio Ricordi in April 1855: "I shall...(change) the subject so as to render it acceptable for Italian theatres". Scribe's suggestions for changing the location – "that the Duke of Alba should just pack his bags once more and move to Lisbon" – it became set in Portugal in 1640 at a time when that country was under Spanish rule. The title became Giovanna de Guzman, but "for censorship reasons it was known variously as Giovanna Braganza, Giovanna di Sicilia, and even Batilde di Turenna", notes Charles Osborne.

Overall, Verdi was not happy with the translation, which Budden regards as "one of the worst ever perpetrated." However, some improvements were made when the opera reverted to its translated Italian title after 1861.

In Italy, this version, along with the ballet, was first performed at the Teatro Regio in Parma on 26 December 1855 and, during the 1855/1856 season, the Italian version was performed nine times, although not without objections to the inclusion of the ballet. Finally, by July 1856, Verdi sanctioned the removal of the thirty-minute ballet, and, with rare exceptions, this has remained the case. The UK premiere took place on 27 July 1859 at the Drury Lane Theatre in London while on 7 November of that year, it appeared at the Academy of Music in New York.

After 1861, in the new post-unification era, it reverted to its translated Italian title, I vespri siciliani, and it is under that title and in that version that the opera has been most commonly performed until recently.

== Performance history ==
Gran Concerto on themes from Verdi's I vespri siciliani
By Antonio Pasculli; performed by Alex Klein, oboe, and Lisa Bergman, piano

From 1856 forward, until the twenty-first century, it was almost always performed in the Italian version. The UK premiere took place on 27 July 1859 at the Drury Lane Theatre in London while on 7 November of that year, it appeared at the Academy of Music in New York. The Metropolitan Opera in New York has staged this version 45 times since 1974, the most recent being 2004.

Companies which plan to present or have presented all of Verdi's works include the Sarasota Opera, ABAO in Bilbao Spain (December 2001), and the "Festival Verdi" in Parma (2010), have staged this opera.

The opera receives regular performance today, both in the original French version and the Italian translation.

== Roles ==
Role: IT: Italian translation with change of location and characters to Portugal. Post-1861: Italian translated versions after 1861, reverting to Italian versions of the names from the original French.	Voice type	Italian version: Premiere Cast, 26 December 1855 Teatro Regio (Parma) (Conductor: Nicola De Giovanni)
IT: Michele de Vasconcello, a Portuguese quisling. Post-1861: Guido di Monforte	baritone	Francesco Cresci
Lord of Bethune, a French officer Post-1861: Lord of Bethune	bass	Guglielmo Giordani
Post-1861: Count Vaudemont, a French officer	bass	Angelo Corazzani
IT: Enrico; Post-1861: Arrigo, a young Sicilian	tenor	Antonio Giuglini
IT: Don Giovanni Ribera Pinto, a Portuguese captain Post-1861: Giovanni da Procida, a Sicilian doctor	bass	Giorgio Atry
IT: Giovanna de Guzman (originally Helena); Post-1861: Elena	soprano	Caterina Goldberg Strossi
Ninette, her maid	contralto	Teresa Lenci Marsili
Post-1861: Danieli, her servant	tenor	Carlo Salvatore Poggiali
Post-1861: Tebaldo, a French soldier	tenor	Raffaele Giorgi
Post-1861: Roberto, a French soldier	baritone	Raimondo Beffagni
Post-1861: Manfredo, a Sicilian, adherent of Procida	tenor	Giovanni Battista Garulli

== Synopsis ==
Place: Palermo, Italy
Time: 1282

=== Act 1 ===
Palermo's main square

Tebaldo, Roberto, and other French soldiers have gathered in front of the Governor's palace. As they offer a toast to their homeland, they are observed by the local Sicilians, unhappy with the occupation.

Elena enters dressed in mourning for her executed brother. Somewhat drunk, Roberto demands that she sing and she calmly agrees. Her song, about the perils of seamen and God's cry of "let dangers be scorned", (Deh! tu calma, o Dio possente / "Pray, O mighty God, calm with thy smile both sky and sea"), only incites the Sicilians to rebellion against the occupiers. When the governor, Monforte, enters the crowd calms down. Then Arrigo announces that he has been released from prison. Alone with Arrigo, Monforte offers him a position with the French as long as he stays away from Elena. He refuses, and immediately follows Elena into the palace.

=== Act 2 ===
Beside the sea

Procida lands on the shore from a small fishing boat. It is clear that he is returning from exile and he expresses his joy at returning to his native land and city: O tu Palermo / "O thou Palermo, adored land...". He is surrounded by Manfredo and other companions and he quickly orders his men to bring Elena and Arrigo to him (Nell'ombra e nel silenzio / "In darkness and in silence"). The three make plans for an uprising during the impending festivities leading to the marriages of a group of young people. After Procida leaves, Elena asks Arrigo what reward he seeks. Swearing that he will avenge her brother's death, he asks for nothing but her love.

Bethune arrives with an invitation from Monforte to attend a ball. Arrigo refuses and is arrested and dragged off. Led by Roberto, a group of French soldiers arrive and Procida returns and sees that it is too late to save Arrigo, since the young people have come into the square and have begun to dance. As the dance becomes more lively, Roberto signals to his men, who seize many of the young women, dragging them off in spite of the protests of the young Sicilian men. The dejected young men witness a passing boat filled with French nobles and Sicilian women, all bound for the ball. Procida and others determine to gain entrance to the ball and seek their revenge.

=== Act 3 ===
Scene 1: Monforte's palace

Monforte reads a paper from the woman whom he abducted, which reveals that Arrigo is his son: Si, m'abboriva ed a ragion! / "Yes, she despised me, and rightly!". Bethune tells him that Arrigo has been brought by force, but Monforte exults in the fact that his son is close by: In braccio alle dovizie / "Given over to riches, surrounded by honors, an immense, horrid void...". The two men confront one another and Arrigo is somewhat puzzled by the way he is being treated. Finally, Monforte reveals the letter written by Arrigo's mother. Taken aback but still defiant, Arrigo insults his father who reacts in anger as the younger man rushes out: Parole fatale, Insulto mortale / "Fatal word!, Mortal insult! The joy has vanished...".

Scene 2: A ball at Monforte's palace

When Monforte enters, he gives the signal for the ballet to begin. In the crowd, but disguised, are Elena, Arrigo, and Procida. Arrigo is surprised when the two reveal themselves and they declare that their purpose is to save the young man. However, he is disturbed to hear that they intend to kill Monforte and when the father approaches the son, there is a hint of warning given. As approaching assassins close in, Arrigo leaps in front of his father just as Elena approaches. The Sicilians are horrified to see that Arrigo is being spared as the ensemble contemplates the situation. Elena, Procida, Danieli and the Sicilians curse Arrigo as they are dragged away, while he wants to follow, but is restrained by Monforte.

=== Act 4 ===
A prison

Arrigo arrives at the prison gate and, on Monforte's orders, waits to be admitted. He contemplates the situation that his friends are in: Giorno di pianto / "Day of weeping, of fierce sorrow!". Elena is brought out and confronts him. Finally, he admits that Monforte is his father and she begins to be willing to sympathise: Arrigo! Ah, parli a un core... / "Arrigo! Ah, you speak to a heart already prepared to forgive." Not seeing Arrigo, Procida approaches Elena and reveals a letter telling him of awaiting freedom. But Monforte arrives and orders a priest and the execution of the prisoners while Procida is amazed to discover the truth of Arrigo's situation. Arrigo begs for mercy for his friends and Monforte confronts him with one thing: Dimme sol, di "Mio padre / "Say to me only, say "My father...". Arrigo says nothing as the executioner appears and the couple are led away, followed by Arrigo. Monforte steps in to prevent him from joining them. As Elena is led towards the executioner, Monforte steps in and announces a pardon for the Sicilians. Furthermore, he agrees to the marriage of Elena and Arrigo and announces to the crowd: "I find a son again!". There is general rejoicing.

=== Act 5 ===
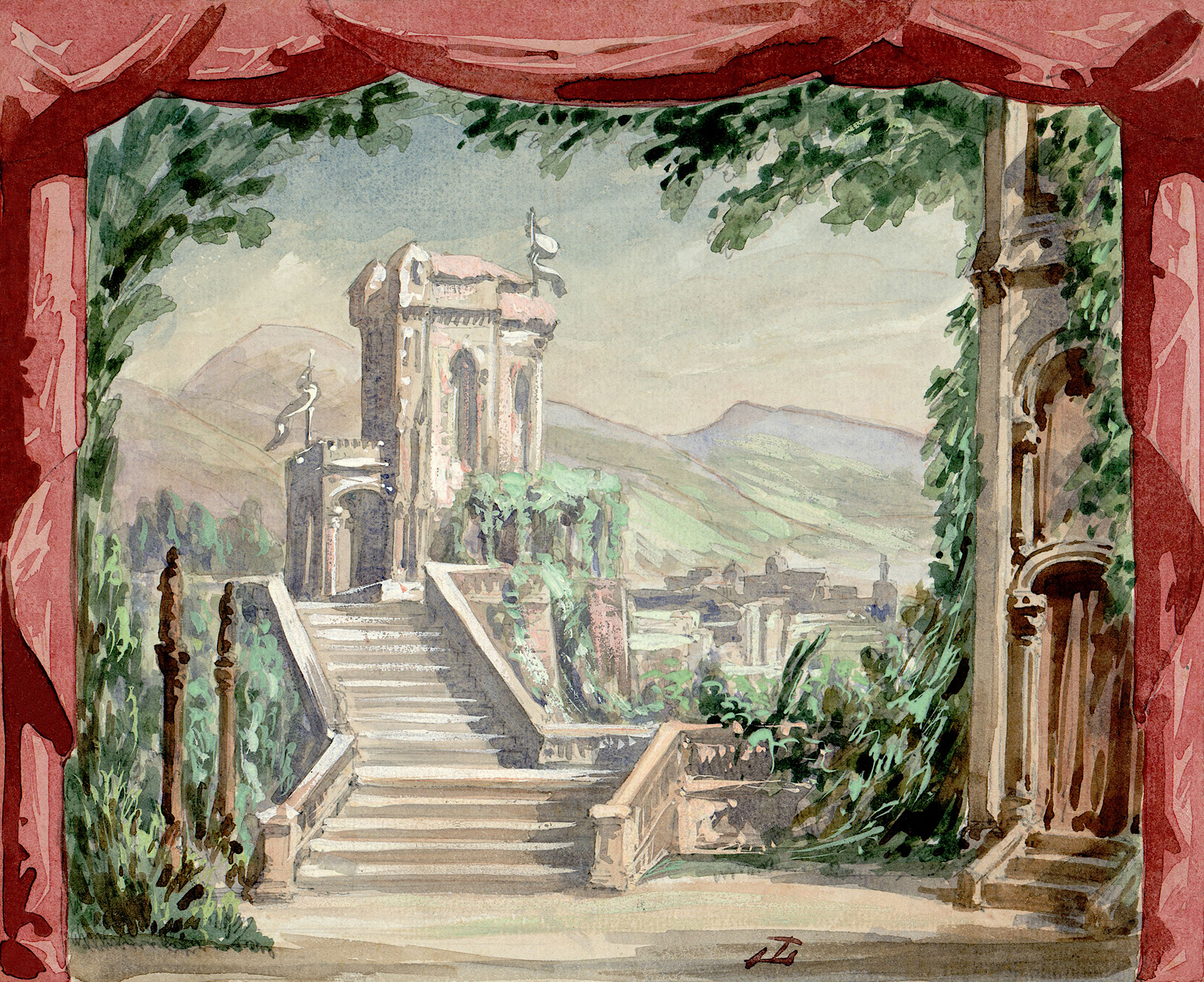
Set design for Act V by Filippo Peroni

The gardens of Monforte's palace

As Knight and maidens gather, Elena gives thanks to all: Mercé, dilette amiche / "Thank you, beloved friends". Arrigo arrives, exclaiming his joy: La brezza aleggia intorno / "La brise souffle au loin" / "The breeze hovers about...". He leaves to find his father, but Procida arrives, announcing a plan to outwit his enemies with their massacre to take place at the foot of the altar after the vows have been said. She is torn, the more so following Arrigo's return, between her love and her duty: Sorte fata! Oh, fier cimento! / "Fatal destiny! Oh, fierce conflict!". Finally, she can go no further and she tells Arrigo that they cannot be married. Both men are furious with her for her seeming betrayal. Then Monforte arrives, takes the couple's hands, joins them together, and pronounces them married as the bells begin to ring. This is the signal for the Sicilians to rush in and hurl themselves upon Monforte and the French.
