= Mélodie Zhao =

Classical pianist (born 1994)

Mélodie Zhao 赵梅笛
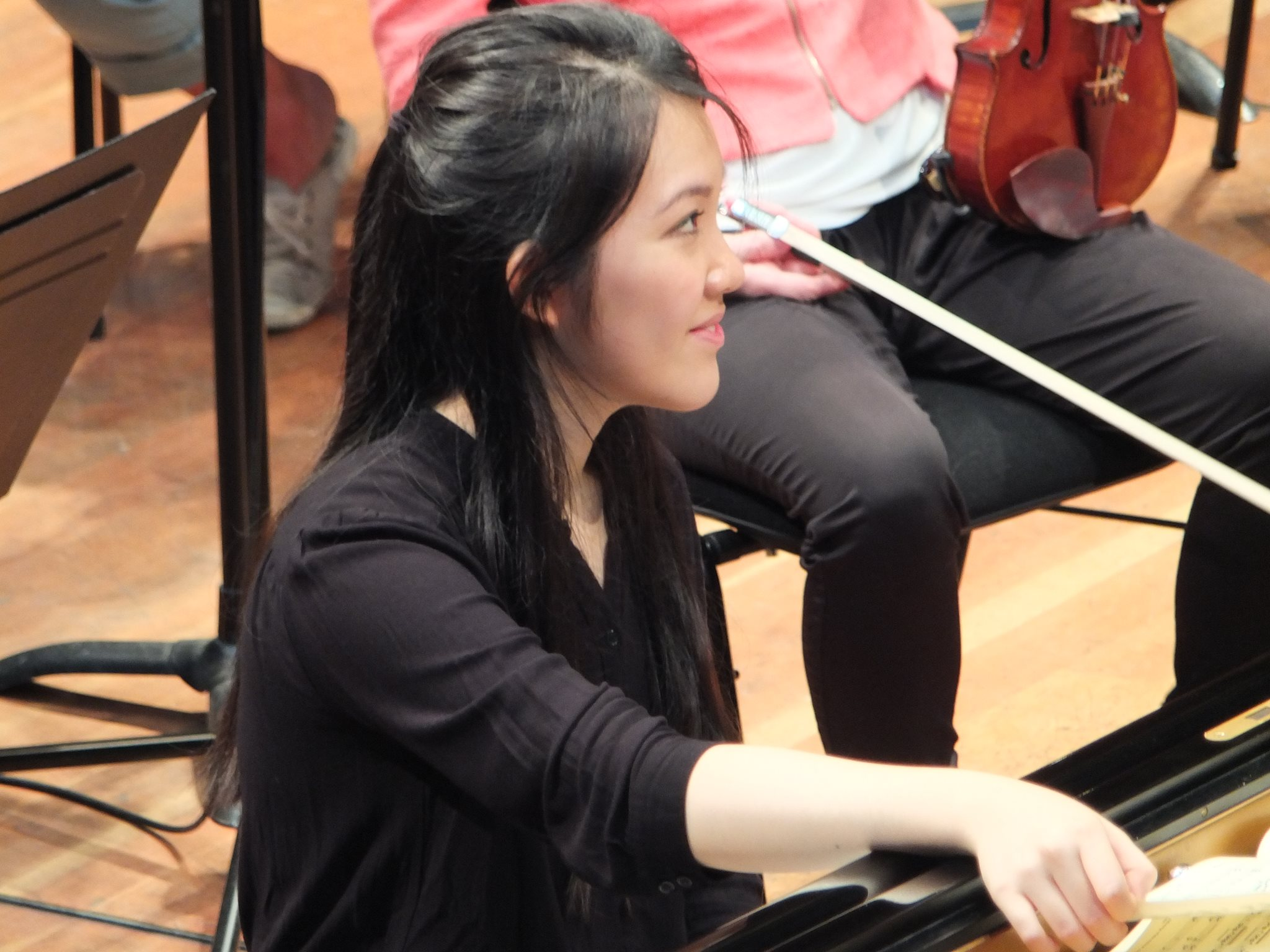
- Mélodie Zhao, recording Tchaikovsky's concertos with the Orchestre de la Suisse Romande in June 2013.

Background information
- Born: Zhao Mélodie; September 7, 1994 (age 31); Bulle, Switzerland
- Genres: Classical
- Occupations: Pianist, composer, conductor
- Instrument: Piano
- Website: melodiezhao.com

Mélodie Zhao (simplified Chinese: 赵梅笛; traditional Chinese: 趙梅笛; pinyin: Zhào Méidí; born September 7, 1994) is a classical pianist. She was born in Bulle, Switzerland.

== Biography ==
Mélodie Zhao began studying the piano at age two. She studied first at the Central Conservatory of Music in Beijing, with Jiaquan Chen until age nine. In 2004, she entered the Geneva Conservatory under the instruction of Mayumi Balet-Kameda and at 13 began working toward her Bachelor of Arts degree in music with Pascal Devoyon at the Geneva University of Music. At the age of 14, she gained her bachelor's degree with highest honours; she also received the François Dumont Prize for the best interpretation of a Beethoven sonata. At age 16, she was awarded a Master Soloist Diploma with distinction, as well as the Georges Filipinetti and Carola Pajonk prizes for the musician with the highest and most refined musical sensitivity. At the same time, Mélodie Zhao was a soloist with Migros Pour-cent culturel from 2009 to 2011. She continues her studies with Pascal Devoyon at the Berlin University of the Arts.

After a first stage performance at age six in Beijing, Mélodie Zhao gave her first complete solo recital at age ten in Geneva. The same year, she performed as soloist with an orchestra. At 13, she performed as soloist with the Zurich Chamber Orchestra directed by Muhai Tang, as well as with Belgorod Symphonic Orchestra from Russia. At 14, she played Chopin's Concerto Nr.2 at Victoria Hall with Geneva Symphonic Orchestra conducted by Hervé Klopfenstein, as well as collaborated with Swiss Camerata and Divertimento string orchestra. She performed as well with the Orchestre de la Suisse Romande, the National Ballet of China Symphony Orchestra, the Shanghai Symphony Orchestra, etc.

At the age of 14, after being invited to give a master class, she became guest professor at the music faculty of the University of Shengli in China.

Mélodie Zhao is also known for her compositions, which are played now and then, especially in China and Switzerland. She wrote a Piano Sonata on the theme of Springs, given for the first time in Jinan. It received a standing ovation when it was premiered in Europe and her achievement has featured on numerous radio and television programmes.

== Recordings ==
Mélodie Zhao recorded her first CD at age 13: the complete Études by Chopin. She sets the world record as the youngest pianist ever to record Chopin’s 24 Etudes.

Three years later, she recorded the complete Transcendental Études by Liszt.

In 2014, in just under a year of recording sessions, she recorded the complete Beethoven Piano sonatas, released by Claves Records under the supervision of her teacher Pascal Devoyon and her father Yuan Zhao.

In 2015, Claves Records releases the first orchestral recording of Mélodie Zhao: Tchaikovsky, Piano Concertos No. 1 & 2, with chief Michail Jurowski and the Orchestre de la Suisse Romande.

== Discography ==
- Chopin, Etudes op.10 & op.25, 2008 (recorded at age 13), Independent Release
- Chopin, Etudes op.10 & op.25, 2013 (digital release), Claves Records
- 12 Études Transcendantes de Liszt (Liszt's Transcendental Etudes), 2011 (recorded at age 16), Claves Records
- Beethoven: Complete Piano Sonatas, 2014 (recorded between 17 and 19), Claves Records
- Tchaikovsky, Piano Concertos No.1 & 2, studio recording with Michail Jurowski and with the Orchestre de la Suisse Romande, 2015 (recorded at age 18), Claves Records
