= Claves Records =

Swiss classical record label

- Founded: 1968
- Founder: Marguerite Dütschler; Ursula Pfaehler
- Genre: Classical
- Country of origin: Switzerland
- Location: Prilly, Vaud
- Official website: www.claves.ch

Claves Records is a Swiss classical record label, which was founded in 1968 by Marguerite Dütschler-Hüber (1931–2006) in Thun.

== History ==
Marguerite Dütschler-Hüber founded Claves with business partner Ursula Pfaehler when her piano teacher Jörg Ewald Dähler was unable to find a company willing to record and issue an LP of Bach preludes. The label specialised in Swiss music and artists such as flutist Peter-Lukas Graf and Lieder recitals by performers including Dietrich Fischer-Dieskau, Teresa Berganza and Ernst Haefliger. Claves also launched the recording career of María Bayo.

Claves Records SA was formally founded in 1968. In 2004, the label was acquired by the Clara Haskil foundation and then by Olivier Verrey who runs the company with other board members. Its first managing director was Antonin Scherrer who was succeeded by Thierry Scherz, In 2010 Patrick Peikert succeeded Scherz as managing director.

Claves Records is now located in Prilly, Switzerland.

== Orchestras ==
- Chamber Orchestra Kremlin
- Chamber Orchestra Tibor Varga
- City Of Birmingham Symphony Orchestra
- English Chamber Orchestra
- Euskadiko Orkestra Sinfonikoa (Basque National Orchestra)
- Orchestra Mozart
- Orchestre de Chambre de Genève
- Orchestre de Chambre de Lausanne
- Orchestre Philharmonique De Monte-Carlo
- Orchestre de la Suisse Romande
- Orchestre de l’Opéra de Rouen Normandie
- Orchestre National de Paris
- Prague Philharmonic Orchestra
- Rundfunk-Sinfonieorchester Saarbrücken
- The Ossipov Balalaika Orchestra

== Artists ==
- Flute & Recorder
  - Peter-Lukas Graf (Flute)
  - Marina Piccinini (Flute)
  - Maurice Steger (Recorder)
- Piano
  - Cédric Pescia
  - Clara Haskil
  - Cristian Budu
  - Dmitri Bashkirov
  - Finghin Collins
  - Fabrizio Chiovetta
  - Francesco Piemontesi
  - Guillaume Bellom
  - Joachim Carr
  - Joseph Moog
  - Kevin Jansson
  - Marc Pantillon
  - Massimilian Mainolfi
  - Mélodie Zhao
  - Michael Studer
  - Michel Dalberto
  - Paavali Jumppanen
  - Ricardo Requejo
- Violin
  - Esther Hoppe
  - Nurit Stark
  - Bianca Favez
  - Alexandra Soumm
  - Nathan Milstein
  - Daniel Röhn
  - Corey Cerovsek
  - Mark Kaplan
  - Tibor Varga
  - Christian Ferras
  - Claude Starck
  - Duilio Galfetti
  - Ettore Causa
  - Ingolf Turban
  - Lisa Schatzman
- Organ & Harpischord
  - Ursula Dütscher (Fortepiano & Harpsichord)
  - Benjamin Righetti (Organ)
  - Kei Koito (Organ)
  - Jörg Ewald Dähler (Haprischord)
- Vocal
  - Teresa Berganza (Soprano)
  - Stephan Genz (Baryton)
  - Brigitte Balleys
  - Dietrich Fischer-Dieskau
  - Eric Tappy
  - Ernst Haefliger
  - Gérard Souzay
  - Gwyneth Jones
  - Herman Wallén
  - Jean-Marie Auberson
  - María Bayo
  - Maria Riccarda Wesseling
  - Martin Homrich
  - Norah Amsellem
  - Ramón Vargas
  - Roberto E Dimitri (Clown Dimitri)
- Harp
  - Anaïs Gaudemard
  - Xavier de Maistre
  - Ursula Holliger
- Cello
  - Nicolas Altstaedt
  - Astrig Siranossian
  - Mattia Zappa
- Oboe
  - Ingo Goritzki
  - Omar Zoboli
- Ensembles, Duos & Trios
  - Duo Crommelynck (Piano 4 Hands)
  - Charl du Plessis Trio (Piano, Bass & Drums)
  - Duo Perlamusica (Piano & Guitar)
  - Trio Nota Bene (Piano, Violin & Cello)
  - Quatuor Sine Nomine
  - Voces Suaves
  - Philip Jones Brass Ensemble
  - Quatuor Terpsycordes
  - Slokar Trombone Quartet
- Conductors
  - Heinz Holliger (Conductor & Oboe)
  - Lawrence Foster (Conductor)
  - Armin Jordan
  - Claudio Abbado
  - Diego Fasolis
  - Emmanuel Krivine
  - Ernest Ansermet
  - Jesus Lopez-Cobos
  - Jörg Ewald Dähler
  - Lucas Macías Navarro
  - Marcello Viotti
  - Peter-Lukas Graf (Conductor & Flute)
  - Victor Desarzens
  - Michail Jurowski

== Collaborations and co-productions ==
- Sommets Musicaux de Gstaad
- Clara Haskil International Piano Competition (Concours Clara Haskil)
- Montres Breguet & Concours de Genève (Geneva Competition)
- Lavaux Classic (Cully Classique)
- RTS - Espace2
