= Alex Klein =

Brazilian oboist (born 1964)

- Born: 1964 (age 61–62); Porto Alegre, Brazil
- Genres: Classical
- Instrument: Oboe
- Sonatine for Oboe and Piano Composed by Thomas Attwood Walmisley, performed by Alex Klein, oboe, and Lisa Bergman, piano Gran Concerto on themes from Verdi's I vespri siciliani Gran Concerto on themes from Verdi's I vespri siciliani, composed by Antonio Pasculli, performed by Alex Klein, oboe, and Lisa Bergman, piano

Alex Klein (born 1964, Porto Alegre, Brazil) is a Brazilian oboist.

== Biography ==
Klein joined the Chicago Symphony Orchestra as principal oboe at age 30 in 1995. He won the 2002 Grammy Award for Best Instrumental soloist with Orchestra for his recording of Richard Strauss' Oboe Concerto with Daniel Barenboim and the Chicago Symphony. He left the Chicago Symphony in July 2004 due to musician's focal dystonia which had begun within two years of his assuming the first chair. During a tour of the Far East with the orchestra, he found his fingers would no longer allow him to play at his finest level throughout a symphony by Tchaikovsky, and asked to resign.

In June 2016, he was once again appointed principal oboe of the Chicago Symphony. However, he was denied tenure in the CSO in April 2017 as a result of not passing the mandatory probation period.

In October 2018, Klein was appointed principal oboe of the Calgary Philharmonic Orchestra. In May 2024, he was terminated from the orchestra, due to "deeply troubling comments posted online".
