= Leggenda di Messer Gianni di Procida =

The Leggenda di Messer Gianni di Procida ("Legend of Mister John of Procida") is a short medieval Tuscan history of the Sicilian Vespers, synoptic with another early Tuscan account, the Liber Jani de Procida et Palialoco. Both texts focus on the conspiratorial role played by John of Procida, who is cast as a villain. A contemporaneous Sicilian writing, Lu rebellamentu di Sichilia, portrays John as a hero. Both Tuscan versions are later than the Sicilian, but may share the Reballamentu as a source. Conversely, all three may derive from an earlier, now lost source. All three agree on the centrality of John of Procida in the Vespers.

The Leggenda was probably written by a Guelph of Modena. Sicilian folklorist Giuseppe Pitrè first suggested that the Leggenda may have influenced the Florentine Nuova Cronica of Giovanni Villani, but a critical study by German historian Otto Hartwig soon dismissed this. The Leggenda is conserved in a Modenese manuscript. It was published by Lodovico Antonio Muratori in his Raccolta degli storici Italiani, XXXIV.
