= Lianna Haroutounian =

Armenian operatic soprano

- Լիաննա Հարությունյան
- Born: 28 July 1975 (age 50); Metsamor, Armenian SSR
- Occupation: Opera singer
- Website: www.liannaharoutounian.com

Lianna Haroutounian is an Armenian operatic soprano. She studied at the Komitas State Conservatory of Yerevan and the Centre de Formation Lyrique of the Opéra Bastille. She made her debut with The Royal Opera in 2013, and is considered by some to be a Verdi specialist.

Haroutounian is considered to be one of the most promising Verdi sopranos of her generation. Her remarkable lyrical-spinto abilities allow her to address a wide opera repertoire, facing Verdi and Puccini as the French and the Russian repertoire, and a wide concert and oratorio repertoire.

== Biography ==
Haroutounian grew up in an opera-loving family in Armenia and studied Pianoforte and Voice at the National Conservatory of Erevan, where she received her Higher Education Singing Diploma in S. Danelian’s class. Later she continued her studies in France, at the Centre de Formation Lyrique de l’Opéra Bastille.

In 2013, she made her debut at the Royal Opera House, Covent Garden, stepping in at a short notice to sing Elizabeth of Valois in Don Carlo, conducted by Antonio Pappano, beside Jonas Kaufmann and Ferruccio Furlanetto. The Guardian wrote, "Haroutounian seemed to pull forth ever-increasing vocal powers until you thought her heart, or yours, would burst …" After that, she was immediately invited to sing Hélène in Stefan Herheim's new production of Les Vêpres Siciliennes at the Royal Opera House, which was seen around the world in the ROH Live Cinema and released on DVD in 2015. During the same season she sang the role at Oper Frankfurt, ABAO of Bilbao, and at the Greek National Opera in Athens (Italian version).

On the concert stage, Haroutounian performed Verdi's Requiem at the Teatro Real of Madrid. She participated in Verdi Gala at the Royal Opera House of Muscat in cooperation with Teatro San Carlo of Naples, conducted by Sebastian Lang-Lessing. In 2014, she made her Zurich Opera House debut as Elisabeth of Valois of Don Carlo, conducted by Fabio Luisi and repeated the role in Verbier Festival in a concert performance, conducted by Daniel Harding.

Haroutounian made her Italian debut at the Teatro San Carlo of Naples in the role of Desdemona in Otello, conducted by Nicola Luisotti, as well as at Sydney Opera House, with grand success.

She participated in the Opera Gala at Festival d'Annecy, and followed with her October San Francisco triumphant debut in the title role of Puccini’s Tosca (conducted by Riccardo Frizza) with great reviews from the public and critics. The SFGATE wrote: “One of the great aspects of soprano Lianna Haroutounian’s phenomenal San Francisco Opera debut on Thursday night was the way she turned her musical gifts to the service of that conception. You could listen to her singing Puccini’s music all night long, and marvel at the beauty, precision and power that she packed into every measure of her performance.”

Her engagements for 2022 include Pique Dame in Barcelona, Suor Angelica and Il Tabarro in Brussels and Madama Butterfly in London
