= Pascal Devoyon =

French pianist

External audio
- Pascal Devoyon performing: Johnann Sebastian Bach's: Concerto for Four Keyboards in A minor, BWV 1065; Concerto for Three Keyboards in D minor, BWV 1063; Concerto for Three Keyboards in C major, BWV 1064; Here on archive.org
- Pascal Devoyon performing: Peter Ilyich Tchaikovsky's: Piano Concerto No. 1 in B flat minor, Op. 23 with Charles Dutoit and the Philharmonia Orchestra in 1991; Here on archive.org

Pascal Devoyon (born 6 April 1953) is a French classical pianist.

== Biography ==
Born in Paris, Devoyon began his studies with Blanche Bascourret de Gueraldi then with Lélia Gousseau at the Conservatoire de Paris where he won first prize in 1971. Then he became famous for his successes at international competitions: the Ferruccio Busoni International Piano Competition (in 1974, second place), the Leeds International Piano Competition (in 1975, tied with Andras Schiff for third place), finally the International Tchaikovsky Competition in Moscow (in 1978, tied with André Laplante for second prize). Favourite in the final of this competition, the jury awarded him only the second place behind Mikhail Pletnev.

The following year he began an international career and gave several concerts in Europe, the United States and the USSR. Among his notable recordings are Maurice Ravel's Gaspard de la nuit and Franz Liszt's Piano Sonata in B minor.

Devoyon often performs as a chamber pianist, and collaborates with cellist Steven Isserlis, as well as violinist Dong-Suk Kang and pianist Rikako Murata. From 1991 he has been teaching at the Conservatoire de Paris, then since 1995 at the Berlin University of the Arts as well as at the Conservatoire de musique de Genève.

Among his pupils are Mélodie Zhao, Caroline Fischer and Louis Schwizgebel-Wang.

At the same time, he continues his concert career.
