= Taronik =

Village in Armavir, Armenia

Taronik Տարոնիկ
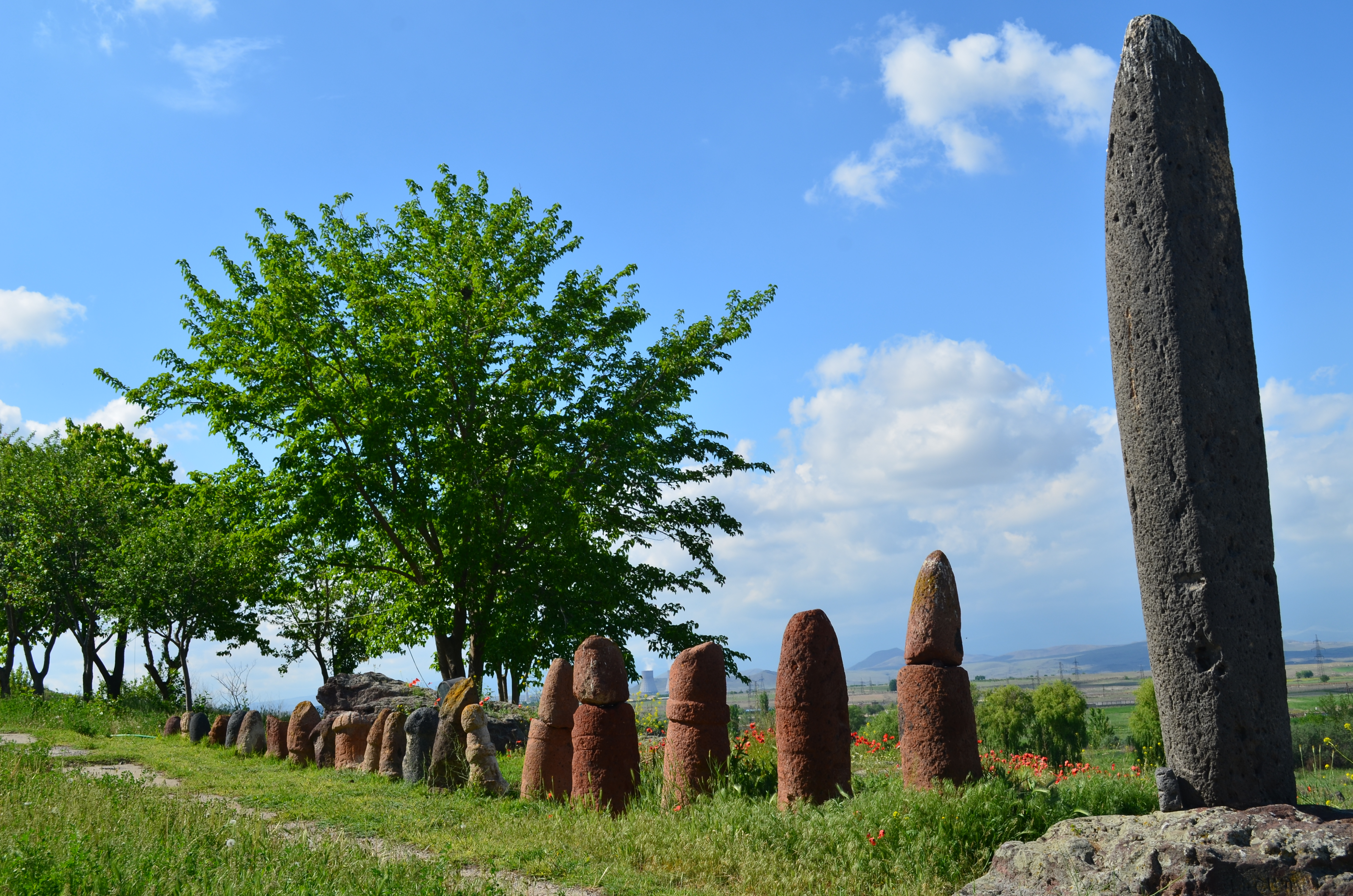
- Standing stones at the ruins of the Metsamor site near Taronik

- Location within Armenia
- Coordinates: 40°07′59″N 44°11′57″E
- Country: Armenia
- Marz (Province): Armavir

Population (2011)
  - Total: 1,892
- Time zone: UTC+4 ( )
  - Summer (DST): UTC+5 ( )

Taronik (Armenian: Տարոնիկ, Armenian: Չեյվա) is a village in the Armavir Province of Armenia. The Iron Age settlement of Metsamor site is located only 1 km southwest of Taronik.

== See also ==
- Armavir Province
