= Giórgios Kokoliós-Bardi =

Greek tenor

Giórgios Kokoliós-Bardi (1916-1964) was a Greek tenor who often appeared with the Greek National Opera, as well as with international theatres.

Born in Athens, he began his studies at the Greek National Conservatory, and made his operatic debut as Matteo Borsa in Rigoletto, in 1942. He appeared with the Greek National Opera as Jaquino in Fidelio, in 1944, which featured the young Maria Callas as Leonore. In 1949, he won a scholarship to study at the Accademia Nazionale di Santa Cecilia, in Rome.

During the period of 1950-1952, he used the stage name Giulio Bardi in Italy. He also appeared, in recital, in the Soviet Union. In 1951, Kokoliós-Bardi sang his most famous performance (recorded "live"), a rare production of Verdi's Les vêpres siciliennes (in Italian translation) at the Maggio Musicale Fiorentino, opposite Callas, Enzo Mascherini, and Boris Christoff, conducted by Erich Kleiber and directed by Herbert Graf. In 1954, the tenor sang Radamès in Aida for the New York City Opera, with Norman Treigle as the King of Egypt.

Also in the tenor's repertoire were leading roles in La forza del destino, L'elisir d'amore, Carmen, Lucia di Lammermoor, Madama Butterfly, La bohème, Nabucco, Pagliacci, Les contes d'Hoffmann, La Gioconda, La traviata, Il trovatore, Faust, and Un ballo in maschera.

On September 5, 1964, Giórgios Kokoliós-Bardi succumbed to cancer, in Athens.
