= Giovanni Zoboli =

Italian composer

Giovanni Zoboli (22 July 1821 - 1884) was an Italian composer.

Born in Naples, Zoboli studied music at that city's Albergo dei Poveri, where his instructors included Paolo Cimarosa, Gennaro Parisi, and Francesco Ruggi. He concluded his studies in 1843, deciding initially to pursue a career in church music; in 1850 he was named to the faculty of his alma mater, teaching counterpoint and composition. During his career he also directed the municipal band of Ariano Irpino. As a composer Zoboli produced symphonic and instrumental works as well as operas. He died in the city of his birth. All of his operas were premiered at the Teatro Nuovo in Naples.

== Operas ==
- Il figlio di papà (1856)
- La villeggiatura (1857)
- Cesare e Cleopatra (1858)
- Un evento inaspettato (1861)
- Il bacio (1864)
- Adina (1866)
- Amelia (c.1870)
- Salvator Rosa (c.1870)
- I tre nipoti (c.1870)
