= Les vêpres siciliennes =

Opera by Giuseppe Verdi

- Grand opera by Giuseppe Verdi
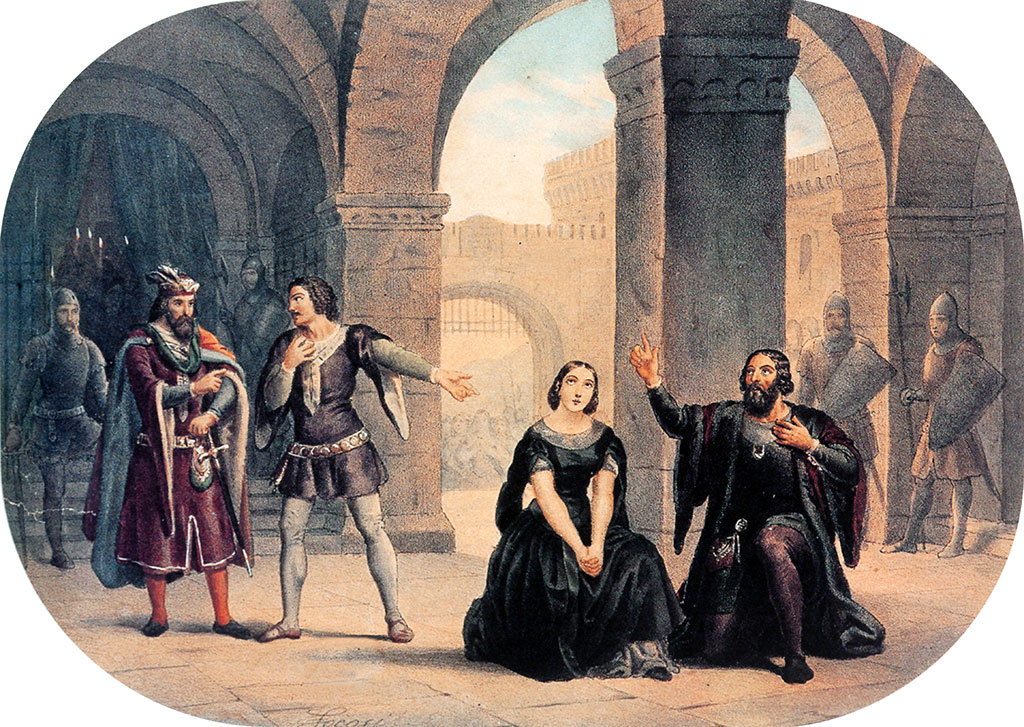
- Scene from the Italian version of the opera (Lithograph by Roberto Focosi)
- Librettist: Eugène Scribe; Charles Duveyrier
- Language: French
- Based on: Original 1838 libretto for Donizetti's Le duc d'Albe
- Premiere: 13 June 1855; Paris Opéra

Les vêpres siciliennes (French pronunciation: [le vɛːpʁ sisiljɛn]; The Sicilian Vespers) is a grand opera in five acts by the Italian romantic composer Giuseppe Verdi set to a French libretto by Eugène Scribe and Charles Duveyrier from their work Le duc d'Albe of 1838. Les vêpres followed immediately after Verdi's three great mid-career masterpieces, Rigoletto, Il trovatore and La traviata of 1850 to 1853 and was first performed at the Paris Opéra on 13 June 1855.

Today the opera is performed both in the original French and (rather more frequently) in its post-1861 Italian version as I vespri siciliani. The story is based on a historical event, the Sicilian Vespers of 1282, using material drawn from the medieval Sicilian tract Lu rebellamentu di Sichilia.

== Composition history ==
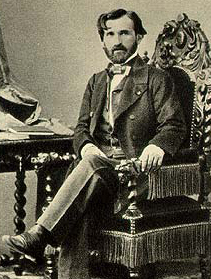
Verdi in 1859

After Verdi's first grand opera for the Paris Opéra – his adaptation of I Lombardi in 1847 given under the title of Jérusalem – the composer had wanted to write a completely new grand opera for the company, the appeal being the same as that which influenced all Italian composers of the day: the challenges of a form different from that of their homeland and the ability to appeal to an audience which welcomed novelty.

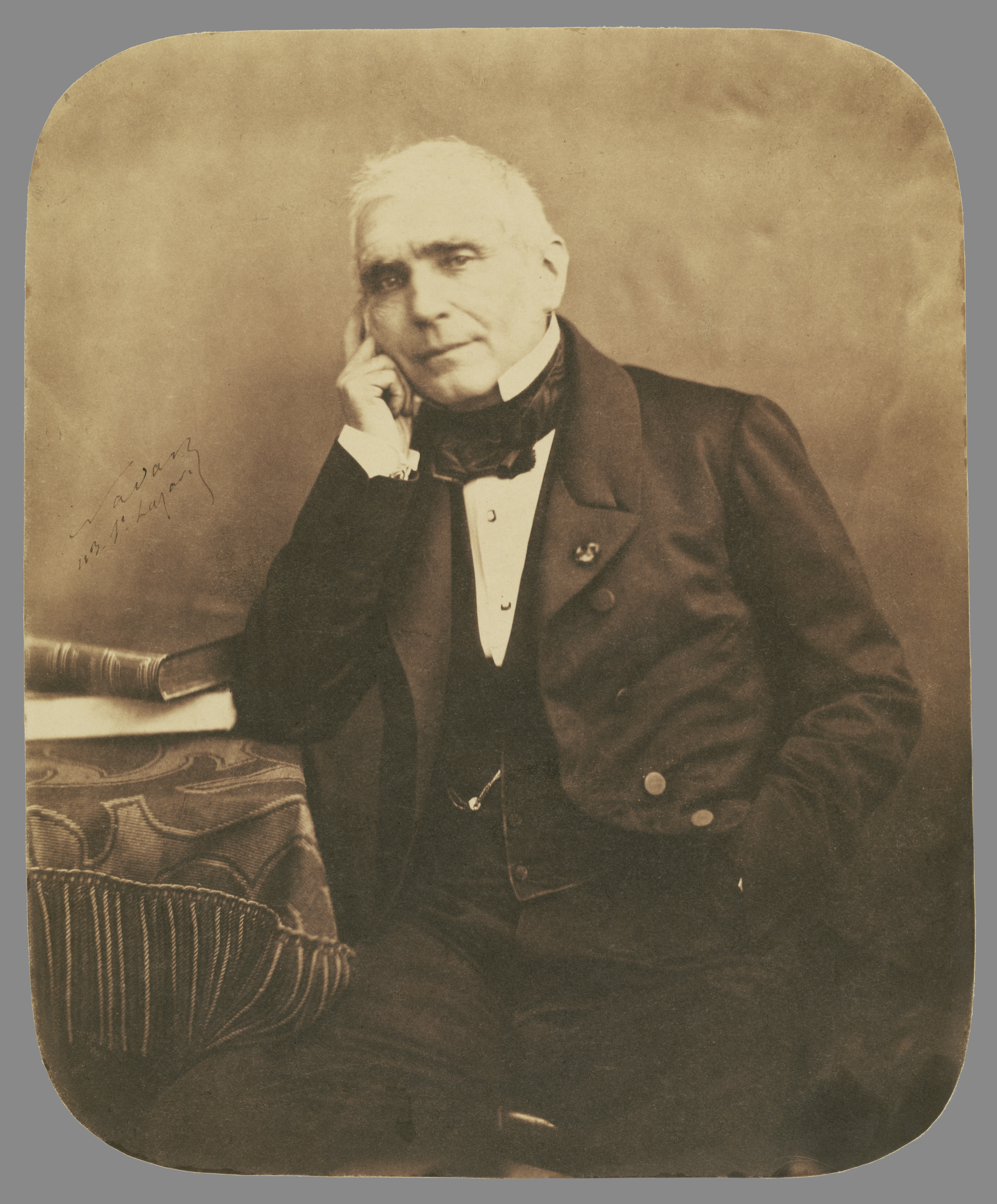
Eugène Scribe, librettist of the opera

Verdi began discussions with the Opéra but negotiations were stalled by the 1848 revolutions and the composer broke them off for a period of time. It was not until February 1852 (while Il trovatore was still being prepared) that he returned to Paris and entered into a contract to write an opera, the libretto to be prepared by Scribe, who was given a deadline for a "treatment" to be delivered on 30 June 1853 with rehearsals to begin in mid-1854 and the opera staged in November/December of that year. Verdi was guaranteed the choice of suitable artists as well as forty performances in the ten months following the premiere.

In July 1852, Verdi had written to Scribe outlining his hopes:

I should like, I need a subject that is grandiose, impassioned and original; a mise-en-scène that is imposing and overwhelming. I have consistently in view so many of those magnificent scene to be found in your poems ... Indeed, these scenes are miracles! But you work them so often that I hope you will work one for me.

When Scribe missed his July 1853 deadline, Verdi went to Paris to negotiate directly and it was then that the librettist proposed a solution, using a revised version of the libretto for Le duc d'Albe, one which had been written about 20 years before at the height of the French grand opera tradition and which had previously been offered to Halévy (who refused it) and to Donizetti (who partly set it to music in 1839 under the original title). Verdi raised many objections, many of these being outlined in a letter from Scribe to Duveyrier of December 1853. They included a change of location, of characters' names, certain specific situations (there being no beer halls in Sicily, for example), plus a demand for a "standard" fifth act to make it equivalent to Meyerbeer's Les Huguenots or Le prophète.

However, this "meant that Verdi was writing his first (original) opéra at a point at which the genre was in a state of flux". Musicologist Julian Budden adds: "In opting for the grandest possible scale, Verdi was running against the current of fashion" (which he notes had significantly shifted in the months and years following the 1848 uprising, so that the country was now firmly in the epoch of Napoleon III, meaning "that the social foundation on which [grand opera] rested was now withdrawn").

Verdi spent 1854 forcing Scribe to make revisions while writing the music, "complaining about the sheer length demanded by audiences at the Opéra". Overall, it was a frustrating time for the composer, especially in dealing with Scribe's 5th act. The librettist was unresponsive to Verdi's pleas for revisions, until finally, he was forced in late 1854 (with no premiere in sight and the mysterious disappearance from rehearsals of Sophie Cruvelli, who sang Hélène) to write to the Opera's director, Louis Crosnier: "To avoid the catastrophe that menaces us ... I see but one means and I do not hesitate to propose it: dissolution of the contract". However, Verdi persevered and was present at the June 1855 premiere, by then having spent close to two years in Paris working on the opera.

== Performance history ==
=== 19th century ===
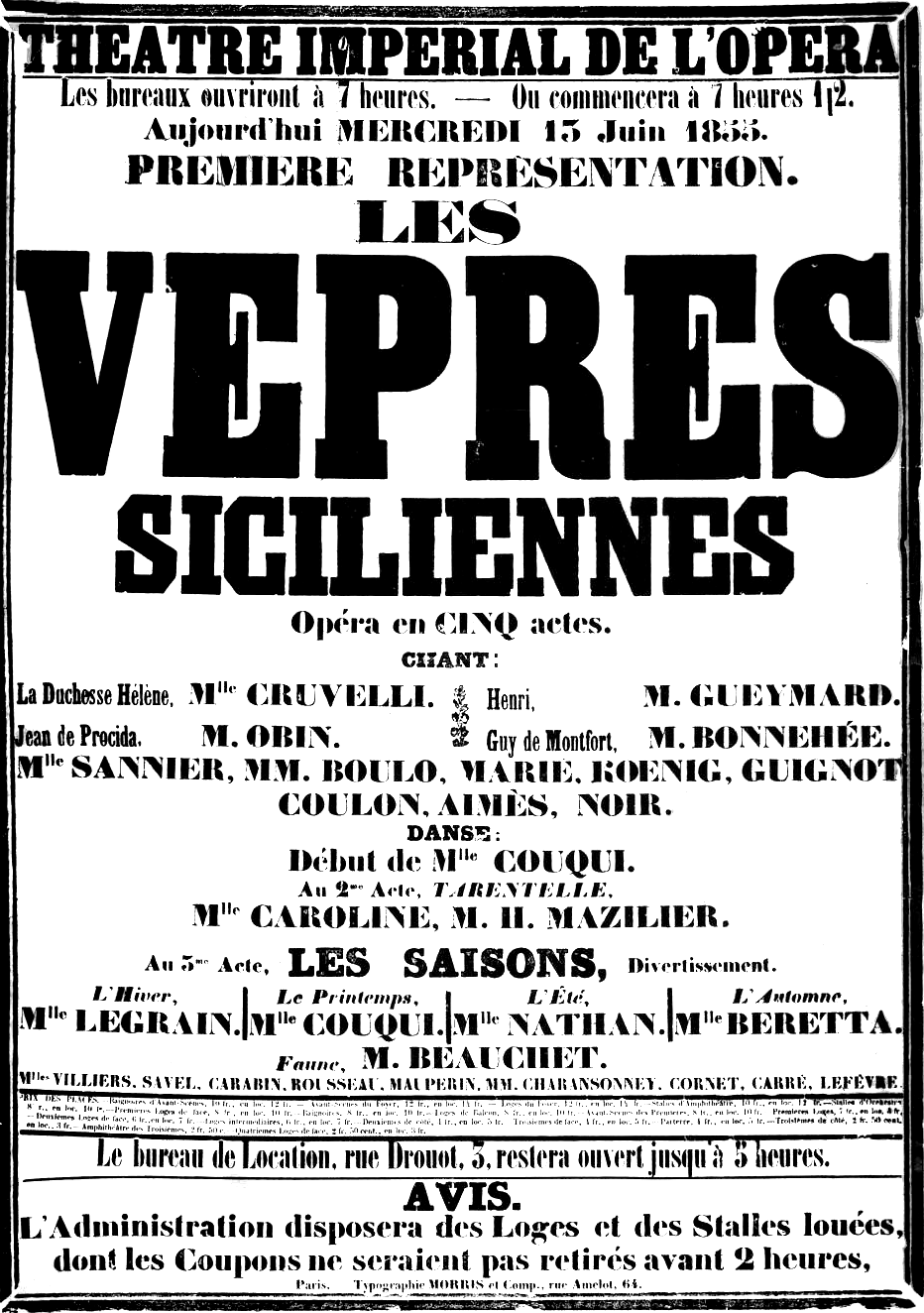
Playbill for the premiere

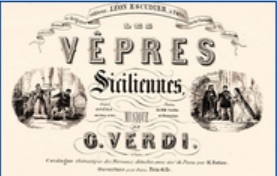
Les vêpres Siciliennes: cover of the score

The first performance at the Paris Opéra on 13 June 1855 was received to great acclaim. La Presse noted: "Verdi's music has conformed to the procedure invented by French genius without losing anything of its Italian ardour.

Hector Berlioz wrote: "In Les vêpres the penetrating intensity of the melodic expressiveness, the sumptuous, wise variety of the instrumentation, the vastness and poetic sonority of the concerted pieces, the hot colour that shines throughout (...) communicate to this opera an imprint of grandeur, a species of sovereign majesty more distinguishable than in this composer's earlier products."

Budden notes that "the critics found much to admire in the new opera. ... Adolphe Adam declared that Les vêpres had converted him to Verdi's music", but Verdi himself, in a letter of late June, notes that three Italian writers were the most critical".

However, its success was not long-lasting. Because the original version never entered the established repertory, performances "limped along" until Verdi attempted to aid its revival at the Paris Opéra on 6 July 1863 by revising some of the roles for selected singers. However, after a few performances, the opera disappeared and was replaced by the French version of Il trovatore, Le trouvère. Except for this one revival in Paris in 1863, "it vanished from the Parisian stage altogether"

==== Italian-language versions ====
Verdi was aware that in Italy at that time, it would have been impossible to place the story in Sicily, as he notes to his publisher Giulio Ricordi in April 1855: "I shall ... (change) the subject so as to render it acceptable for Italian theatres." Based on Scribe's suggestions for changing the location – "I suggested that the Duke of Alba should just pack his bags once more and move to Lisbon" – it became Portugal in 1640 while under Spanish control. An Italian translation of the libretto with the new location and new role names was prepared by the poet Eugenio Caimi, and the title was changed to Giovanna de Guzman. This version was performed on 26 December 1855 in Parma and at La Scala in Milan on 4 February 1856. Alfred Loewenberg credits the translation used for the performance in Parma to Arnaldo Fusinato and the one used in Milan to Caimi, but Julian Budden states that the two translations are virtually identical and argues both were by Caimi. However, some modern performances credit the Italian translation to Fusinato (for examples, see the DVDs of performances in 2003 at the Teatro Verdi, Busseto, and in 2010 at the Teatro Regio di Parma). In 1857, Italian versions were performed in Naples: at the Teatro Nuovo with the title Giovanni di Sicilia in the spring and at the Teatro San Carlo with the title Batilde di Turenna in the autumn.

Overall, Verdi was not happy with the translation, which Budden regards as "one of the worst ever perpetrated". Some improvements were made after the unification of Italy in 1861, when the title of the Italian version of the opera was changed to I vespri siciliani. Verdi wrote to Ricordi on 6 June 1865: "I now know what it means to translate and I feel sympathy for all bad translations that are around because it is impossible to make a good one".

The opera was also performed outside of Italy in Italian translation: Barcelona (4 October 1856), Lisbon (12 March 1857), Saint Petersburg (1857), Santiago, Chile (1857), London at the Drury Lane Theatre (27 July 1859), New York City (7 November 1859), Constantinople (October 1860), Buenos Aires (23 May 1862), Havana (1862), Malta (1862), Mexico (November 1864), Sydney (May 1870), and Rio de Janeiro (1872).

==== Other languages ====
It was performed in Hungarian in Budapest (1856); in German (in a translation by Karl Ferdinand Dräxler-Manfred) in Darmstadt (14 March 1857; revived 12 September 1887), Vienna (19 November 1857), and Prague (1859); and in Polish in Warsaw (1872). A Swedish translation by Fritz Arlberg was published in 1872.

=== 20th century and beyond ===
After a long period of relative neglect, the opera in its original French version has begun to appear onstage more regularly in the 21st century. In March 1994, Sarasota Opera earned the honor of premiering Verdi's original French text in North America as part of the "Verdi Cycle," an effort to produce all of the composer's music. A production was mounted at the Bastille Opera in 2003 and a 2010 production by the Netherlands Opera. In May 2011 French versions were presented at the Grand Théâtre de Genève and at the Teatro San Carlo in Naples and, in February 2013, the ABAO company in Bilbao presented the opera.

Other presentations have included stagings by Frankfurt Opera in 2013 and Bavarian State Opera in 2018.

The Royal Opera House Covent Garden's staging of the full version for the first time in its history (minus the ballet) in October/November 2013 drew a variety of critical responses.

== Roles ==
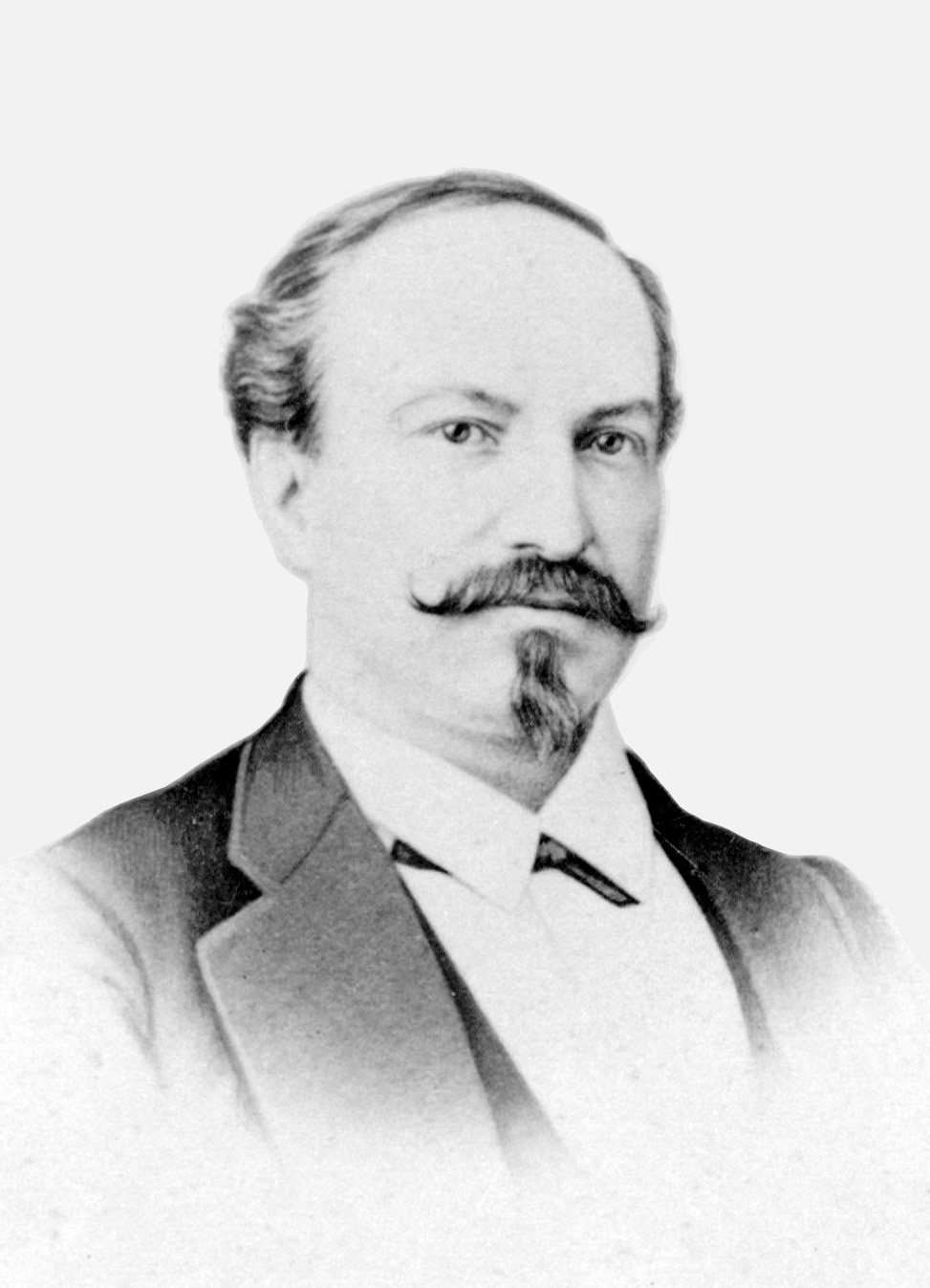
Baritone Marc Bonnehée

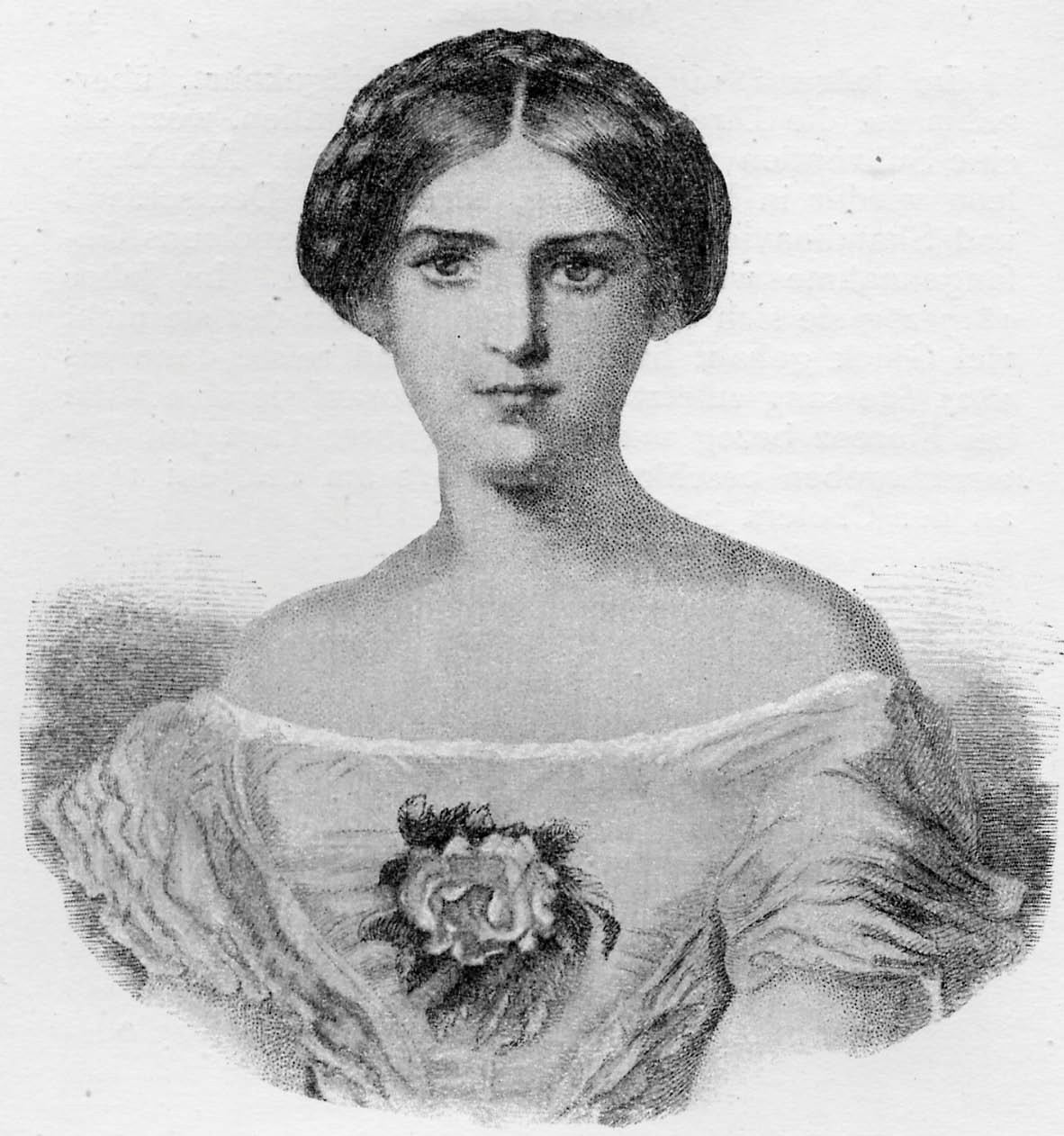
Soprano Sophie Cruvelli

Roles, voice types, premiere cast
Role	Voice type	Premiere cast, 13 June 1855 Conductor: Narcisse Girard
Guy de Montfort, Governor of Sicily under Charles d'Anjou, King of Naples	baritone	Marc Bonnehée
Le Sire de Béthune, a French officer	bass	Théodore-Jean-Joseph Coulon
Le Comte de Vaudemont, a French officer	bass	Jacques-Alfred Guignot
Henri, a young Sicilian	tenor	Louis Guéymard
Jean Procida, a Sicilian doctor	bass	Louis-Henri Obin
La Duchesse Hélène, sister of Duke Frederick of Austria	soprano	Sophie Cruvelli
Ninette, her maid	contralto	Clarisse-Françoise Sannier
Daniéli, her servant	tenor	Jean-Jacques Boulo
Thibault, a French soldier	tenor	M. Aimes
Robert, a French soldier	baritone	Mécène Marié de l'Isle
Mainfroid, a Sicilian, adherent of Procida	tenor	Joseph Koenig

== Synopsis ==
Place: Palermo, Italy
Time: 1282

Sinfonia (overture), part 1

Part 2
Orchestra Martucci, Phonodisc Mondial, before 1909

Prior to the events of the opera, Procida, a leading Sicilian patriot, was wounded by French troops during their invasion of Sicily, and was forced into exile. Montfort, leader of the French troops, raped a Sicilian woman who later gave birth to a son, Henri. Montfort became governor of Sicily, while the Sicilian woman brought up her son to hate him, without revealing to Henri that Montfort was his father.

=== Act 1 ===
Palermo's main square

Thibault, Robert and other French soldiers have gathered in front of the Governor's palace. As they offer a toast to their homeland, they are observed by the local Sicilians, unhappy with the occupation.

Hélène, who is being held hostage by the French governor, Montfort, enters dressed in mourning for her brother, Duke Frédéric of Austria, who had been executed by the French exactly a year before and whose death remains unavenged. Somewhat drunk, Robert, a French soldier of low rank, demands that she sing and she agrees. Her song about the prayers of seamen (Ô viens à nous, Dieu tutélaire! – "Pray, O mighty God, calm with thy smile both sky and sea") and God's reply of "let dangers be scorned" ends with a rallying-cry (Courage!… du courage!) to the Sicilians to rebel against the occupiers. When the governor enters, the crowd calms down. Henri, just released from prison, assures Hélène how deeply he despises the governor. Overhearing this, Montfort orders Hélène to leave and then, alone with Henri, offers him a powerful position with his men as long as he stays away from Hélène. He refuses, and immediately follows Hélène into the palace.

=== Act 2 ===
Beside the sea

Procida lands on the shore from a small fishing boat. It is clear that he is returning from exile and he expresses his joy at returning to his native land and city (Et toi, Palerme – "O thou Palermo, adored land"). He is surrounded by Mainfroid and other companions and he quickly orders his men to bring Hélène and Henri to him (Dans l'ombre et le silence – "In darkness and in silence"). The three make plans for an uprising during the impending festivities leading to the marriages of a group of young people. After Procida leaves, Hélène asks Henri what reward he seeks. Swearing that he will avenge her brother's death, he asks for nothing but her love.

Béthune arrives with an invitation from Montfort to attend a ball. Henri refuses and is arrested and dragged off. Led by Robert, a group of French soldiers arrive and Procida returns and sees that it is too late to save Henri, since the young people have come into the square and have begun to dance. As the dance becomes more lively, Robert signals to his men, who seize many of the young women, dragging them off in spite of the protests of the young Sicilian men. The dejected young men witness a passing boat filled with French nobles and Sicilian women, all bound for the ball. Procida and others determine to gain entrance to the ball and seek their revenge.

=== Act 3 ===
Scene 1: Montfort's palace

Montfort reads a paper from the woman whom he abducted, which reveals that Henri is his son (Oui, je fus bien coupable et coupable par elle! – "Yes, I was guilty, and she blamed me!"). Béthune tells him that Henri has been brought by force, but Montfort exalts in the fact that his son is close by (Au sein de la puissance – "Amid the power, amid the grandeur, an immense, terrible void"). The two men confront one another and Henri is somewhat puzzled by the way he is being treated. Finally, Montfort reveals the letter written by Henri's mother. Taken aback but still defiant, Henri insults his father who reacts in anger as the younger man rushes out: "Fatal word!, Mortal insult! The joy has vanished ...".

Scene 2: A ball at Montfort's palace

When Montfort enters, he gives the signal for the ballet to begin. In the crowd, but disguised, are Hélène, Henri, and Procida. Henri is surprised when the two reveal themselves and they declare that their purpose is to save the young man. However, he is disturbed to hear that they intend to kill Montfort and when the father approaches the son, there is a hint of warning given. As approaching assassins close in, Henri leaps in front of his father just as Hélène approaches. The Sicilians are horrified to see that Henri is being spared as the ensemble contemplates the situation. Hélène, Procida, Daniéli and the Sicilians curse Henri as they are dragged away, while he wants to follow, but is restrained by Montfort.

=== Act 4 ===
A prison

Henri arrives at the prison gate and, on Montfort's orders, waits to be admitted. He contemplates the situation that his friends are in (O jour de peine – Day of weeping, of fierce sorrow!"). Hélène is brought out and confronts him. Finally, he admits that Montfort is his father and she begins to be willing to sympathise (Ami! le cœur d'Hélène... – "Henri! Ah, you speak to a heart already prepared to forgive") Not seeing Henri, Procida approaches Hélène and reveals a letter telling him of awaiting freedom. But Montfort arrives and orders a priest and the execution of the prisoners while Procida is amazed to discover the truth of Henri's situation. Henri begs for mercy for his friends and Montfort confronts him with one thing: Dis: mon père! dis – "Say to me only, say "My father ...". Henri says nothing as the executioner appears and the pair are led away, followed by Henri. Montfort steps in to prevent him from joining them. As Hélène is led towards the executioner, Montfort steps in and announces a pardon for the Sicilians. Furthermore, he agrees to the marriage of Hélène and Henri and announces to the crowd: "I find a son again!" There is general rejoicing.

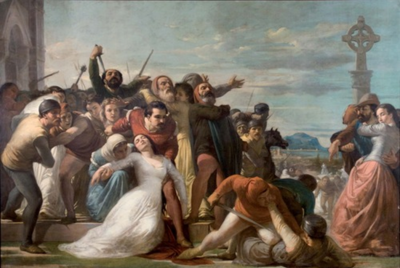
Painting of the Vespers, probably according to the opera's final act

=== Act 5 ===
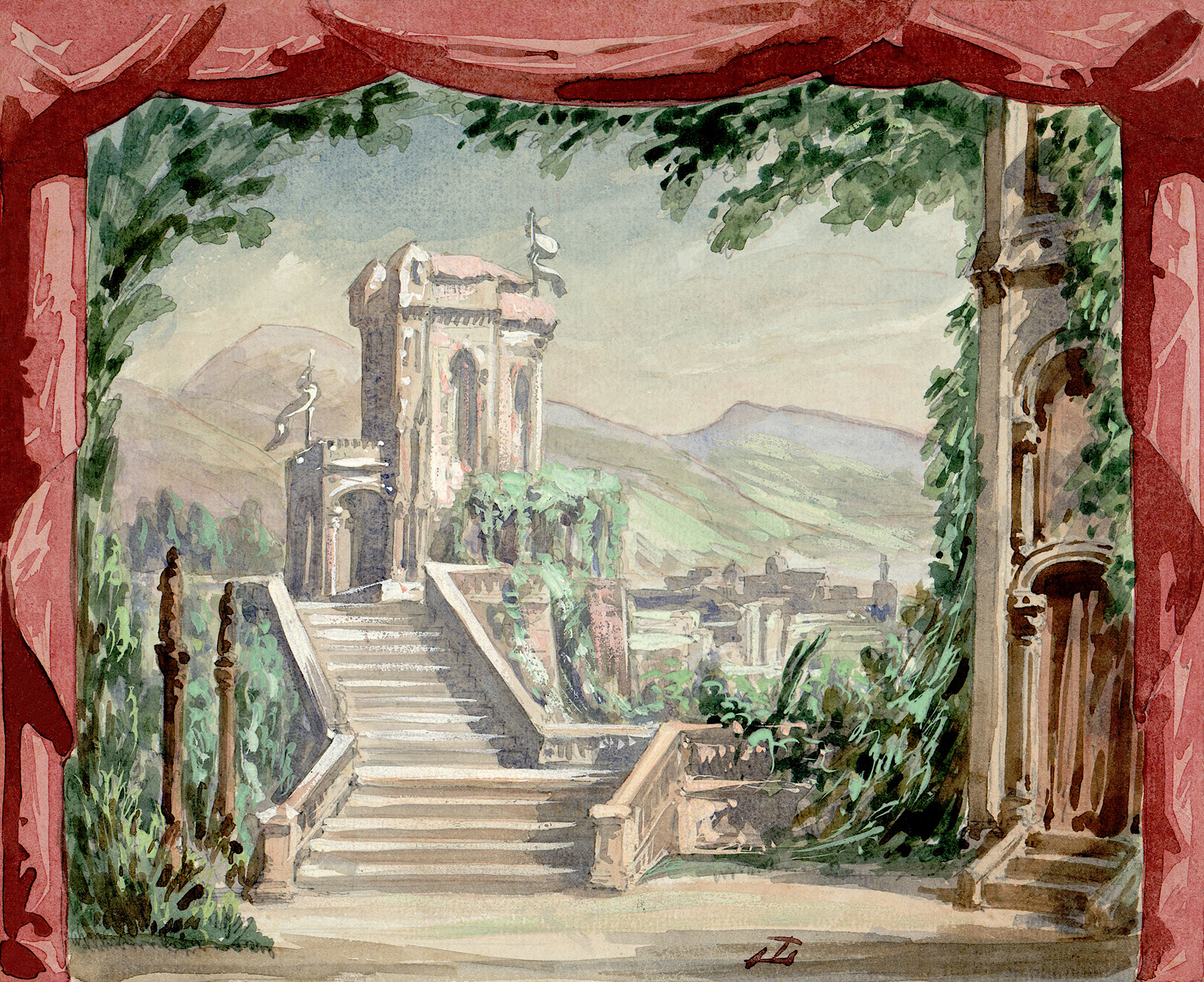
"Rich gardens in the Palace of Monforte in Palermo", set design for I vespri siciliani act 5 (undated)

The gardens of Montfort's palace

As knights and maidens gather, Hélène gives thanks to all (Merci, jeunes amies – "Thank you, young friends"). Henri arrives, exclaiming his joy (La brise souffle au loin – "The breeze hovers about"). He leaves to find his father, but Procida arrives, announcing a plan to outwit his enemies with their massacre to take place at the foot of the altar after the vows have been said. She is torn, the more so following Henri's return, between her love and her duty (Sort fatal! – "Fatal destiny! Oh, fierce conflict!"). Finally, she can go no further and she tells Henri that they cannot be married. Both men are furious with her for her seeming betrayal. Then Montfort arrives, takes the couple's hands, joins them together, and pronounces them married as the bells begin to ring. This is the signal for the Sicilians to rush in and hurl themselves upon Montfort and the French.

== Music ==
In summing the effect of the libretto as "a competent framework for an opera of effects, of spectacle and theatrical surprise, and Verdi ended by accepting it as such", musicologist Julian Budden then notes two of its aspects which appear distinctive and which are visible in the music. Firstly, "he used it as a basis for a new, more ample, more rhythmically complex style of melody. Here the model of Meyerbeer was important ... Secondly, he seized the opportunity of solving a problem which had eluded him in a somewhat similar work, La battaglia di Legnano; namely that of reconciling the private and public emotions of the main characters. ... .the problem being overcome by means of a more varied musical language."

Musicologist Roger Parker, writing in Grove in 1992, offers a somewhat different point of view in explaining that the sheer length and scale of this opera (as well as others in the grand opera tradition) find themselves being rarely staged by modern opera houses (since 1992 this situation has changed, see performance history section above). Parker states "with very few exceptions, its main lyrical numbers lack the melodic immediacy of the trio of Italian operas (Rigoletto, Il trovatore and La traviata) that immediately preceded it." However, he does go on to say that Les vêpres "marks a decisive turn away from the language of the middle-period Italian operas and the emergence of many stylistic features we associate with the later Verdi."

== Coda ==
Given the frustrations which Verdi encountered in the two-year-long preparation of the opera and the several expressions of these frustrations in letters to Giuseppina Strepponi (with whom he was having a relationship which began about 1847), writer Irving Kolodin in his essay for the RCA recording, hits on a solution which Strepponi herself had provided:

In your position I wouldn't tie myself in any way for the present. I should look for a libretto I liked and set it to music without any engagement and in my own time.(Italics in the original).

Kolodin comments: "It was, of course, the principle by which Verdi's later career was guided when he had the land and the position he craved and the security that went with them and a wise wife."
