= John of Procida =

Italian physician and diplomat (1210–1298)

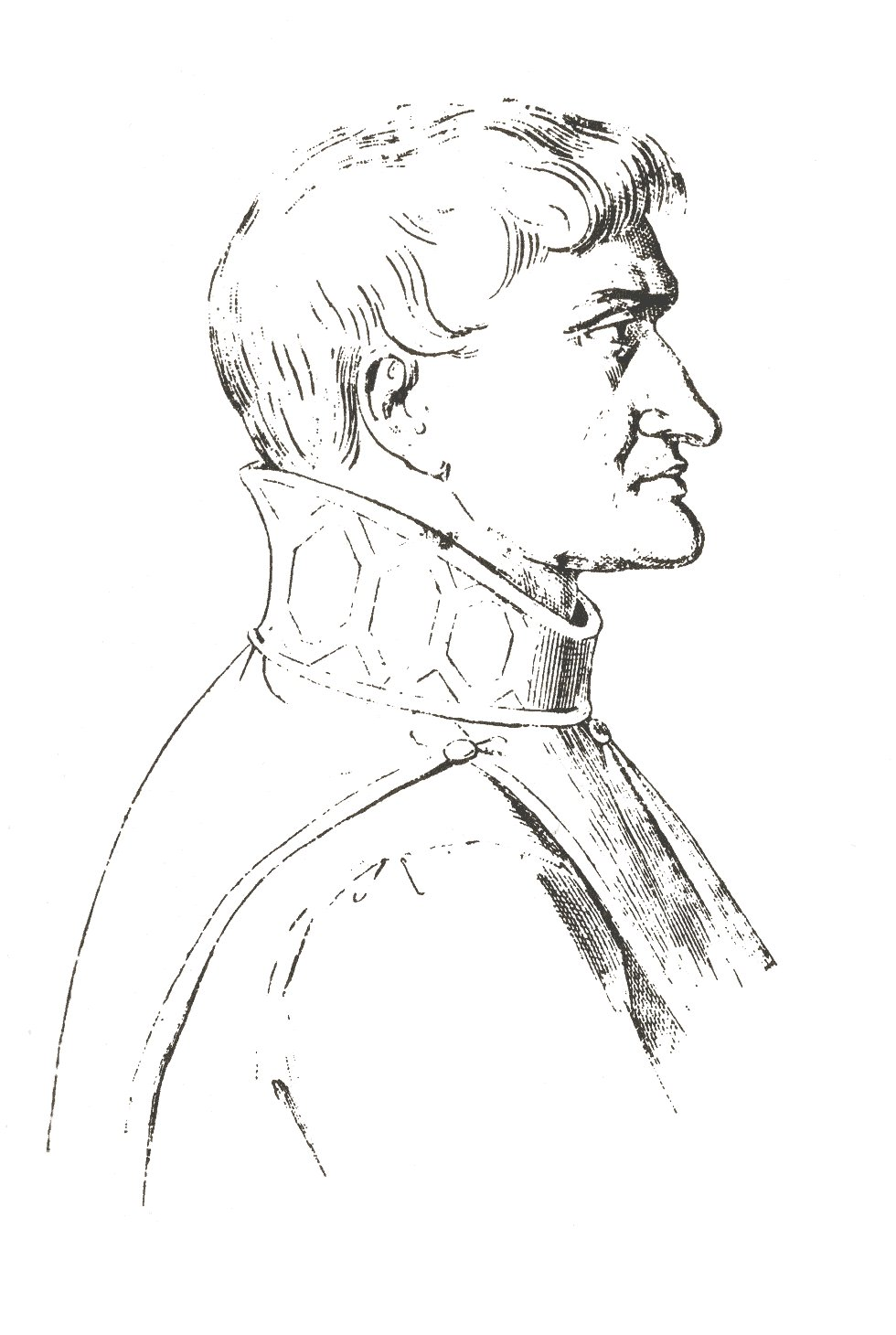
Reproduction of the profile present in the Duomo of Salerno (Michele Parascandolo. Storia di Procida, Benevento, 1893).

John of Procida (Italian: Giovanni da Procida, Sicilian: Giuvanni da Procida; 1210–1298) was an Italian medieval physician and diplomat.

He was born in Salerno, educated in the Schola Medica as a physician. He was a noted physician for his age and received a professorial chair at this university. He came to the attention of Frederick II, who was patron of the university, and he eventually became Frederick's personal physician and attended him to his death. He was also personal physician to Cardinal John Orsini, the future Pope Nicholas III. Being noticed for his intelligence and pragmatism, he rose through the diplomatic ranks in the Hohenstaufen Kingdom of Sicily. He was actually John III, son of John II of Procida and Clemenza Logoteta, of the family of the lords of the island of Procida.

He was originally a counsellor of Frederick II and was entrusted with the education of Frederick's son Manfred. He was at Manfred's side until his defeat at the Battle of Benevento in 1266. In that year he went to Viterbo, Italy and arranged the marriage of his daughter to the Neapolitan Guelph, Bartholomew Caracciolo, and then served with the Hohenstaufen army. After the defeat of the Hohenstaufens at Tagliacozzo he escaped to Venice. His estates were confiscated by Charles; and his wife and daughter were mistreated or raped by the French knight sent to evict them and one of his sons murdered. In 1269 or 1270 he was in Germany trying to drum up support for the return of the Hohenstaufen to the throne of Sicily. While existing Sicilian legends overplay John of Procida's role in the dramatic politics of this time, Runciman concurs that he was at the centre of a "vast political conspiracy" in support of the House of Hohenstaufen (backed by the Byzantines and their Genoese allies) and against Charles of Anjou and his ally the Pope.

In 1279 and 1280 John (or, as Runciman argues, one of his sons at his behest) travelled to Sicily to stir up the discontents in favour of King Peter of Aragon and thence to Constantinople to procure the support of the emperor Michael VIII Palaeologus. Michael refused to aid the Aragonese king without papal approval and so diplomatic efforts turned to Rome, where he gained the consent of Pope Nicholas III, who feared the ascent of Charles of Anjou in the Mezzogiorno. John of Procida then returned to Barcelona. The result of these travels was to link Byzantine gold and Genoese assistance behind Aragonese ambitions in Sicily. Through John's secret diplomatic actions the conditions were set for the 1282 uprising of the Sicilian Vespers which destroyed Charles' crusading invasion fleet (aimed first at recapturing Constantinople) at anchor in Messina, providing the conditions for the security of Constantinople and the ability of Peter III to recover the island.

On 2 February 1283, Peter, who had invaded Sicily in the wake of the Vespers uprising, nominated John as Grand Chancellor. He was put in charge of the island when Peter went to France to take up a challenge by Charles later that year. All this did not stop the aged diplomat from continuing his frenetic activity at the varied courts of Europe's monarchs. It was on one of these trips that he died, at Rome, at the age of eighty-eight years, in 1298.

The legacy of John of Procida is controversial. Lu rebellamentu di Sichilia, a Sicilian-language tract from 1290, lauds him highly and it may well be his own memoir as dictated to a scribe. He is more typically portrayed, particularly by Guelph partisans, as cospiratore contro l'autorità costituita, a "conspirator against the constitutional authority", as in the Tuscan Liber Jani de Procida et Palialoco, which presents him in negotiations with Michael VIII, and in the Leggenda di Messer Gianni di Procida, written by a Modenese Guelph. His reputation has experienced a bit of a rehabilitation, and he has been called one of the first politicians and diplomats in the modern senses of the terms. Clearly, his diplomatic role was important: the Sicilian uprising began the War of the Sicilian Vespers, the "world war" of the 13th century, a key event in the subsequent history of Europe.

According to legend, he was in Naples incognito on 29 October 1268, when they executed Conradin. He supposedly recovered the guanto di sfida (gauntlet) Conradin threw into the crowd before his execution.

== Sources ==
- Chaytor, H. J. (1933). A History of Aragon and Catalonia. London: Methuen.
- Mendola, Louis. Sicily's Rebellion against King Charles. New York, 2015. Translation of Lu rebellamentu di Sichilia.
- Runciman, Steven. The Sicilian Vespers. Cambridge University Press, 1958.
