= Atanasiu di Iaci =

Italian presbyter and historian

Frate Atanasiu di Iaci or Athanasiu da Jaci (Italian: Atanasio) was a Benedictine monk and historiographer from Aci. He wrote Vinuta di lu re Japicu in Catania (c.1295), a Sicilian chronicle (or romance) of the arrival and stay of James I in Catania in May 1287. He may also be the author of another Sicilian history, Lu rebellamentu di Sichilia, written circa 1290, by an anonymous person of Messina. Vincenzo di Giovanni suggested that Atanasiu was of Saracen ancestry.

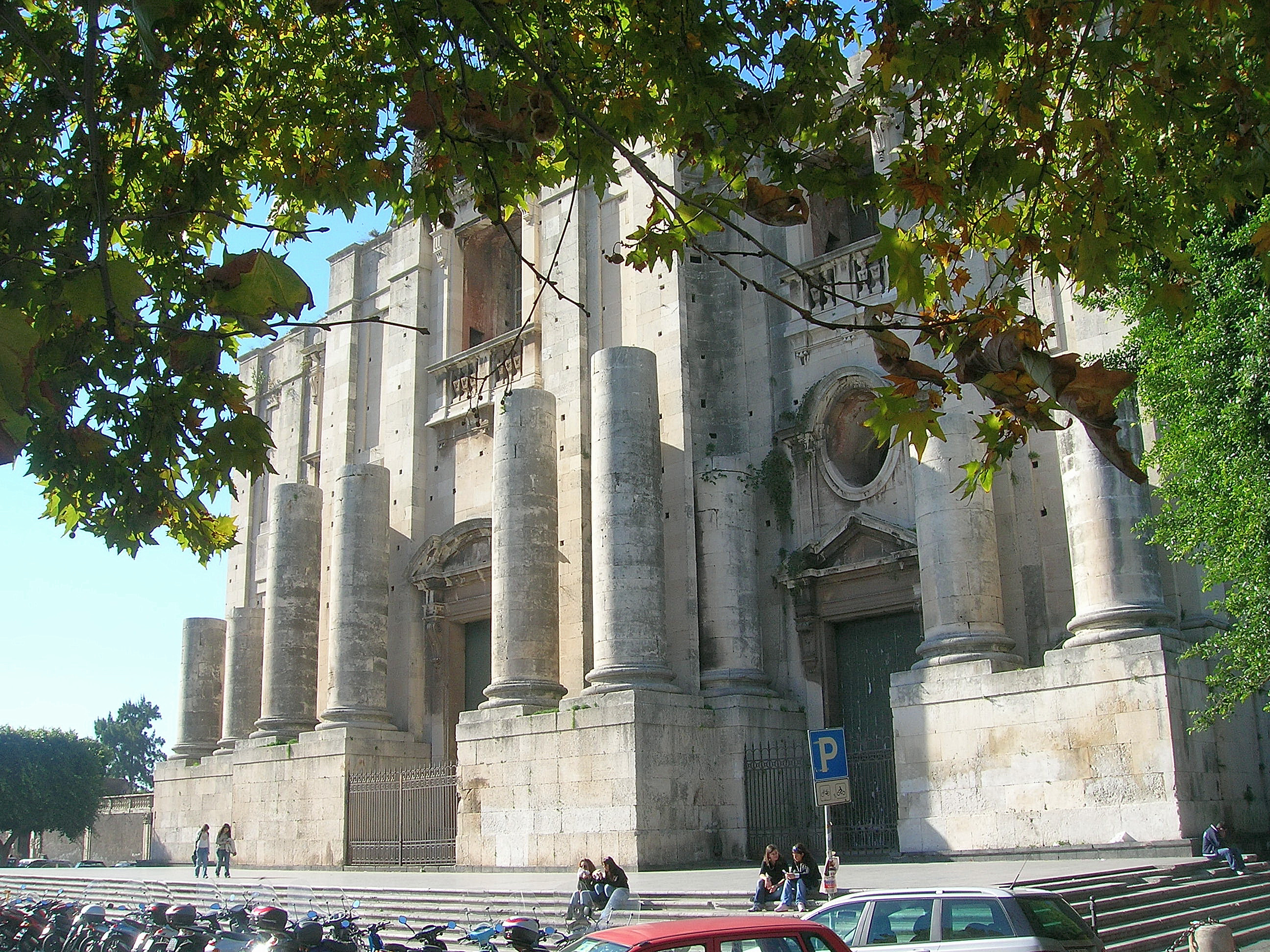
San Nicolò l'Arena, where the manuscript was found and where Atanasiu may have been a monk

Vincenzo de Gaetano first expressed doubt about the authenticity of the Vinuta and the historicity of Atanasiu. The Vinuta appears in no earlier work than Pietro Carrera, Delle memorie historiche della città di Cantania (1639). He claimed to have found it in a manuscript of San Nicolò l'Arena, now lost. It was first published by the Pietro Bentivegna of Palermo in their Opuscoli di autori Siciliani (1760). Its authorship was also treated by Antonio Mongitore Biblioteca Sicula (1708). The Vinuta was accepted as authentic by Enrico Sicardi for his 1917 edition. Kenneth Setton follows him, but notes that though it sometimes adds valuable details to the history of the War of the Sicilian Vespers, it is frequently untrustworthy. Giulio Bertoni considered it authentic, pointing to the antiquity of its language. More recently, Louis Mendola contends that there is no basis for believing in the historicity of its putative author. If authentic, the Vinuta is an important source for the influence of the Italian languages on Sicilian.

Below is a passage describing James' arrival in Catania, then occupied by the Angevins, mostly Frenchmen, followers of Charles of Anjou:

La vinuta di lu re Japicu a la gitati di Catania, fu a lu primu di Maju di l'anno 1287 all'Ave Maria: trasiu per la porta di Jaci, e fu incuntratu da tutti li gitatini cu' alligrizza; ma chiui di tutti vinia multu malenconicu pirchi havia vidutu multi galeri franzisi vicinu di Catania, e si cridia chi nixianu di lu portu di Catania.	The arrival of the king James at the city of Catania, was on the first of May of the year 1287 to the Hail Mary: he entered by the port of Acireale, and was met by all the citizens with happiness; but above all came many malcontents because they had seen many French galleys near Catania, and it was believed that they had not left from the port of Catania.

The French (franzisi) had landed on the same day between Catania and Syracuse and had begun to besiege Augusta. By June their supplies were running short. In July they were forced to lift their siege of Augusta and their garrison fled Catania.

== Editions ==
- Biondelli, Bernardino (1856). Studi linguìstici. G. Bernardoni.
