= Lu rebellamentu di Sichilia =

The Rebellamentu in a codex that was kept in the Biblioteca Nazionale di Palermo until it was bought by the prince of San Giorgio Spinelli di Napoli in 1870. The left page contains the excerpt that is transcribed below.

Lu rebellamentu di Sichilia, fully Cronica di lu rebellamentu di Sichilia contra re Carlu, is a Sicilian historical chronicle of the War of the Vespers written around 1290. The anonymous Rebellamentu, probably written at Messina, was ascribed to Atanasiu di Iaci by Pasquale Castorina in 1883. Though the Rebellamentu sometimes adds valuable details to the history of the Vespers, it is frequently untrustworthy. Its monastic provenance is evident in its moralising tone. The antiquity of its language has placed its authenticity beyond doubt, despite its lack of an early manuscript tradition. This has not prevented speculation that it was written contemporarily with events: one verb in one manuscript is found in the first-person present; this may represent the author inadvertently stepping out of his usual frame of reference, or merely an error in that manuscript.

The Rebellamentu covers the years 1279–82 and treats John of Procida as a hero. It is also the earliest chronicle to record that violence broke out after a Sicilian woman was raped by a French soldier, a story also recorded by Atanasiu di Iaci elsewhere. It says that when the Sicilians complained to Charles of Anjou about their high taxes, he responded, "Vi farro spendiri munita di soli, como altra volta havitu spisu," threatening that he would re-issue leather money as had been done in the past. This probably indicates that the legend that William I issued leather money, otherwise first recorded by Tommaso Fazello in his De Rebus Siculis (1558), was current in the late thirteenth century. The Rebellamentu also makes the Orsini Pope Nicholas III party to a conspiracy to dethrone Charles of Anjou. The Florentine chronicler Giovanni Villani, who was biased against the Orsini because of the legation of Napoleone Orsini to Florence in 1306, supports the allegation.

The Rebellamentu covers John's negotiations with the Byzantine emperor Michael VIII Palaeologus and with Peter III of Aragon, the Sicilian Vespers, the coronation of Peter in Palermo in August 1282, the retreat of Charles to Calabria, and the entry of Peter and John into Messina in October 1282. The excerpt below describes how Peter was crowned by the Bishop of Cefalù because the incumbent of the Archdiocese of Palermo, Piero II de Santa Fede, had recently died, and the Archbishop of Monreale, Giovanni Roccamezza, was away in Rome:

In lu annu dili milli du chentu octanta dui anni dilu aduentu di Christu, in lu misi di Agustu cabalcau lu Re di Aragona di Trapani inPalermu, et li Palermitani ficiru grandi solemnitati dila sua vinuta, sicomu homini liquali aspittavanu liberacioni di morti; di chi lu ascuntraru ben sei migla cum grandi gazara di donni e dunzelli, homini, effimini, Conti e Baruni e Caualeri, li Arcifiscopu di Murriali no ni vosi trovari a dari li coruna (et inPalermu havia statu mortu lu loru Arcifiscopu) si ki quilla di Murriali fugiu, et andau piedi alu Papa; e cussì no fu corunatu, si no chamatu dilu populu. [...] Quistu esti lu Rebellamentu di Sichilia lu quali hordinau effichi fari Misser iohanni di prochita contra lu re Carlu. [...] Incalzaru la briga contra li francishi et livaru a rimuri e fforo a li armi li franchischi cum li palermitani et li homini a rimuri di petri e di armi gridandu «moranu li franchischi» et intraru in la chitati cum grandi rimuri et foru per li plazi et quanti francischi trouavanu tutti li auchidianu infra quilli rimuri lu capitanu chi era tandu per lu Re Carlu.	In the year of Our Lord Christ one thousand two hundred and eighty two, in the month of August the king of Aragon rode from Trapani to Palermo, and the Palermitans were extraordinarily happy of its coming, as men waiting to be freed by death; they welcomed him at least six miles outside the city, with a big uproar of women and girls, men, effeminates, Counts and Barons and Knights, anyway the Archbishop of Monreale didn't wish to crown him (and also the Archbishop of Palermo had recently died) in so much that he ran away, and walked by foot to the Pope; so the king wasn't crowned, but was said to be a people's king [...] This was the rebellion of Sicily, that was planned and led by Lord John of Procida against king Charles [...] They moved against the French, who were alerted from the noises, and there was a battle between French and Palermitans, and between the noises of the battle, of rocks and weapons, you could hear the screams "death to the French" and they entered the city with great clamor, and they went through the squares, and they killed as many French as they could kill, and between them there was the captain who at that time had been a supporter of king Charles.

The Spinelli Codex, the oldest surviving copy of the text, was probably copied from an older manuscript (perhaps the original) around 1330. It was published in English translation in 2015.

Two later Tuscan histories of the Vespers—the Liber Jani de Procida et Palialoco and the Leggenda di Messer Gianni di Procida—may share the Reballamentu as a source. Conversely, all three may derive from an earlier, now lost source. All three agree on the centrality of John of Procida in the Vespers. The opera Les vêpres siciliennes (1855), with music by Giuseppe Verdi and a libretto by Eugène Scribe, drew upon the Rebellamentu for elements of its story, notably the rape.

== Editions ==
- Lu rebellamentu di Sichilia. Codice della Biblioteca regionale di Palermo. Edited by Filippo Evola (1882).
- Il vespro siciliano. Cronaca siciliana anonima intitolata Lu rebellamentu di Sichilia, codice esistente nell' Archivio municipale di Catania. Edited by Pasquale Castorina (1882).
- Lu rebellamentu di Sichilia, edited by Marcello Barbato (Palermo, Centro di studi filologici e linguistici siciliani, 2010).
- Sicily's Rebellion against King Charles. The Rebellamentu translated and annotated by Louis Mendola based on the Spinelli Codex (New York, 2015) ISBN 9781943639038.
