= Omar Zoboli =

Omar Zoboli (born 1953, Modena) is an Italian oboist, since 1998 till 2018 professor at the Musikhochschule Basel - Switzerland

== Studies and competitions ==
He studied Oboe under Sergio Possidoni, Heinz Holliger and Paul Dombrecht. Experience and inspiration was gained by working with Nikolaus Harnoncourt and Frans Brüggen.

He gained first prize at the International Competition of Ancona and at the Italian Television (RAI) Competition for Young Performers 1978.

== Activities, performances ==
He owes his international reputation largely to his first recordings (among others a CD dedicated to Antonio Pasculli, the “Paganini of the Oboe”) which were received with great acclaim, and brought engagements at various festivals and with major orchestras in Berlin, Rotterdam, Paris, Warsaw, Lugano, Geneva, Zurich, Basel, Milan, London, Japan and the United States.

Besides being a soloist, he is a performer varying from duo to baroque ensemble, playing on period instruments, and from wind octet (Ottetto Classico Italiano) to larger string-wind groups and contemporary music included improvisation.

Composers like Sylvano Bussotti, Niccolò Castiglioni, Paul Glass, Éric Gaudibert, Francesco Hoch, Alessandro Lucchetti,Luca Mosca,Albert Möschinger,Mario Pagliarani,Gianni Possio and many others have written for and dedicated works to him.

He has recorded a DVD (Lebrun Concerto, Frans Brüggen conducting) and about 30 LPs and CDs for Accord, Claves, Divox, Ex Libris, Harmonia Mundi, Jecklin, Koch-Schwann, Stradivarius, Teldec and others with works that represent the oboe repertoire of the last three centuries at its very best.

Omar Zoboli has been oboe soloist of the Radio Orchestras of Lugano (RSI) and Naples (RAI), the St. Gallen Symphony Orchestra and the Kammerorchester Basel.

He has played baroque and classical oboes with Concentus Musicus Wien (Nikolaus Harnoncourt), Il Giardino Armonico (Giovanni Antonini), Scintilla Orchester Zürich, I Barocchisti (Diego Fasolis).

Since 1991, he has also been conducting with great success his own projects with large wind ensembles and orchestras.

== Teaching, master classes ==
He has been invited to give master classes in England at the Royal College of Music in Kensington and at the Royal Academy of Music, Spain, Portugal, Germany, Netherlands, Sweden, Czech Republic, Italy, Switzerland, South America, China, Israel.

Since 1988 till 2018 he has been teaching oboe and chamber music at the Basel Music Academy. Actually professor for chamber music at Conservatorio della Svizzera Italiana, Lugano.
