= Antonio Pasculli =

Italian oboist and composer

- Born: 13 October 1842; Palermo, Kingdom of the Two Sicilies
- Died: 23 February 1924 (aged 81) Palermo, Sicily
- Genres: Romantic
- Instruments: Oboe, English Horn

Antonio Pasculli (13 October 1842 – 23 February 1924) was an Italian oboist and composer, known as "the Paganini of the oboe".

== Biography ==
Pasculli was born in Palermo, Sicily on 13 October 1842. He lived there his whole life but travelled widely in Italy, Germany and Austria, giving oboe concerts. He directed symphonic and wind orchestra concerts, which were popular in Italy at the time. He also transcribed a large number of opera pieces for oboe and piano/harp, including works by Bellini, Donizetti, Verdi, and Rossini. One of his well-known works is Etude Caractéristique for oboe and piano "Le Api" (The Bees) written in 1874 which resembles and precedes Rimsky-Korsakov's "Flight of the Bumblebee".

He died in Palermo on 23 February 1924.

Pasculli's works require extraordinary virtuosity on the instrument. His pieces make constant use of arpeggiations, trills, and scales, and require the oboist to use circular breathing. His output was essentially forgotten early in the twentieth century, and he remained in oblivion until oboists Heinz Holliger and Omar Zoboli began reviving his music. As a result, some of his works are now available in recordings.

== Compositions ==
=== Chamber works ===
- Le Api (The Bees), for oboe & piano
- Concerto sopra motivi dell'opera 'La favorita' di Donizetti, for oboe & piano
- Fantasia sull'opera 'Poliuto' di Donizetti, for oboe & piano
- Fantasia sull'opera 'Les Huguenots' di Meyerbeer, for oboe & piano
- Ricordo di Napoli: Scherzo brillante, for oboe & piano
- Amelia - un pensiero del Ballo in Maschera, for English horn & piano
- Ommagio a Bellini on themes from 'Il Pirata' and 'La Sonnambula', for English horn & harp
- Gran Sestetto concertante (after Rossini's Guillaume Tell) (arr. W. Renz)
- Rimembranze del Rigoletto, for oboe and piano
- Simpatici Ricordi della Traviata, for oboe and piano

=== Concertos ===
- Concerto on themes from Donizetti's 'La Favorita', for oboe and piano
- Gran Concerto on themes from Verdi's 'I Vespri Siciliani', for oboe and piano
- Concerto on themes from Verdi's 'Il trovatore', for oboe and piano

Gran Concerto
Performed by Alex Klein, oboe and Lisa Bergman, piano
