= Metsamor site =

Chalcolithic archaeological site in Armenia

Coordinates: 40°7′34.59″N 44°11′12.46″E

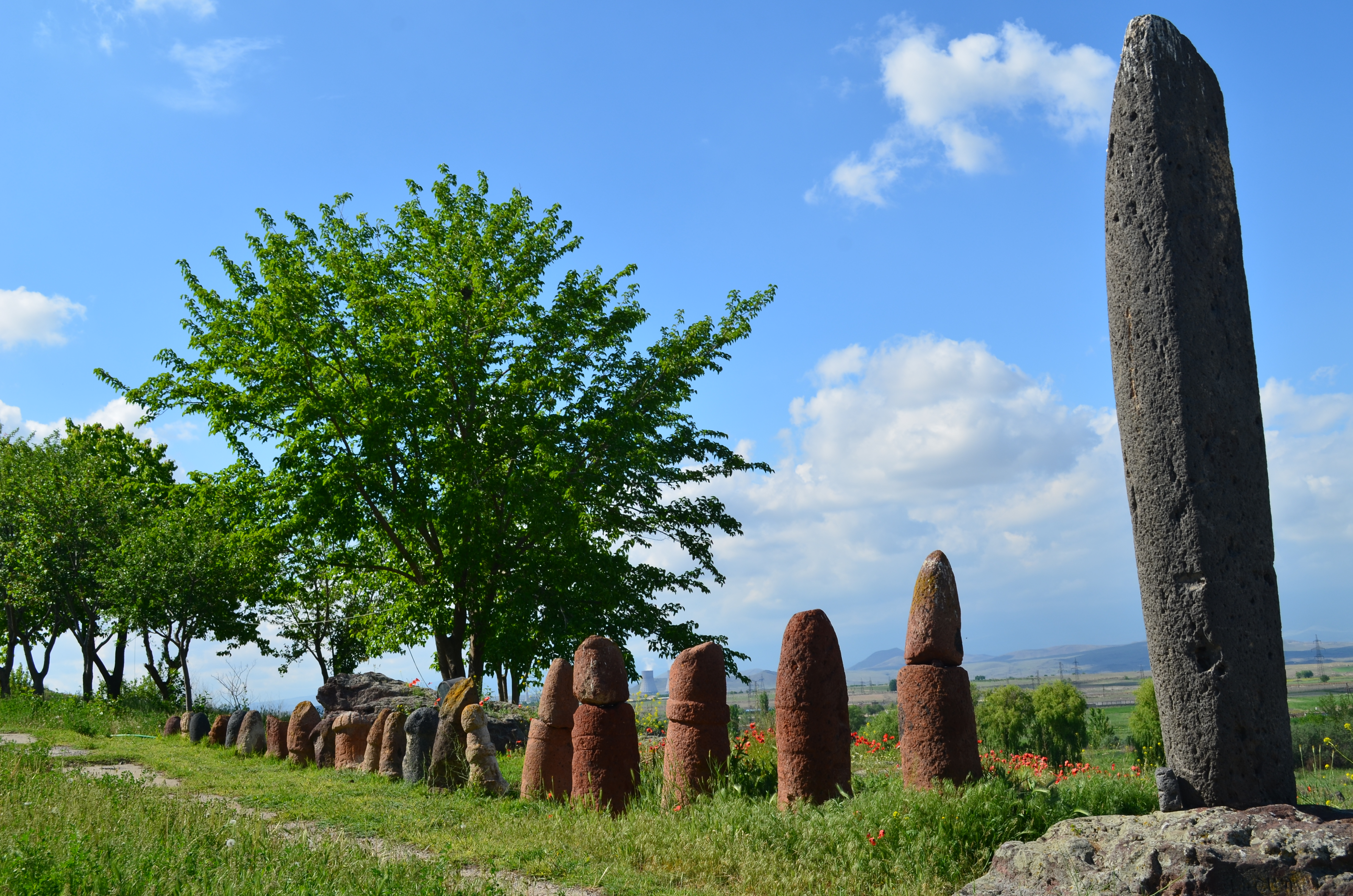
Standing stones at the ruins of the Metsamor site

The Metsamor site is an archaeological site in the Ararat Plain region of Armenia. It includes the remains of settlements and structures dating from the Chalcolithic, Bronze, and Early Iron Ages.

According to tradition, Metsamor was destroyed in the Iron Age by the Urartians; researchers now believe it was destroyed by Scythian or Cimmerian nomads.

The Metsamor site is to the southwest of the village of Taronik, in the Armavir Province.

== History ==
Metsamor is centered on a hill overlooking the Ararat Valley. Archaeologists have excavated the fortified citadel, the area known as the "lower town" below the citadel, and the cemetery to the east. Early digs revealed an undisturbed stratigraphic sequence that began in the Bronze Age—the Kura–Araxes culture (c. 4000–2000 BC)—and ended in the early modern period. The oldest traces of settlement date to the turn of the 4th millennium BC, in the Bronze Age or Chalcolithic; the youngest date to the 17th century CE. In the Late Bronze and Early Iron Ages (15th–8th century BC), the settlement became an important religious and economic center with a developed metallurgical production. On the southern slope of the hill was a large religious complex consisting of five small temples with clay “cascading” altars. Recovered artifacts include gold necklaces and gilded belt fittings which depict hunting lionesses.

== Excavations ==
Research in Metsamor has been conducted since 1965. Until the 1990s, work was carried out by Armenian teams directed by Emma Khanzadyan and Koryun Mkrtchyan; in the years 2011–2013, Ashot Piliposyan headed the excavations. All the finds are displayed in the museum located at the site. In 2013, an Armenian-Polish archaeological expedition started work in Metsamor as a result of the cooperation between the Institute of Archaeology and the Polish Centre of Mediterranean Archaeology (from the University of Warsaw) and the Service for the Protection of Historical and Cultural Environment and Museum Reservation, Ministry of Culture of Armenia. Krzysztof Jakubiak (IA UW) and Ashot Piliposyan are co-directors of the mission. Jakubiak says that Metsamor "has an important role among the settlements of the Ararat Valley."

== Museum ==
The Museum of History and Archeology at Metsamor Site was opened in 1968. It is the repository of more than 22,000 items, almost all discovered at the site.
