= Sicilian Vespers (disambiguation) =

The Sicilian Vespers was a rebellion on the island of Sicily that broke out in 1282.

Sicilian Vespers may also refer to:

- I vespri siciliani (The Sicilian Vespers), an opera by Giuseppe Verdi based on the historical event
- Night of the Sicilian Vespers, a group of mafia-related murders in New York City in 1931
- Operation Sicilian Vespers (disambiguation)
- War of the Sicilian Vespers, a conflict that started with the Sicilian Vespers
- The Sicilian Vespers (Hayez), the three works by Italian artist Francesco Hayez

== See also ==
- Cilician Vespers, a 1909 massacre in the Ottoman Empire
- Vespers (disambiguation)
