= Macalda di Scaletta =

Italian courtesan, noblewoman and adventurer

- Baroness of Ficarra
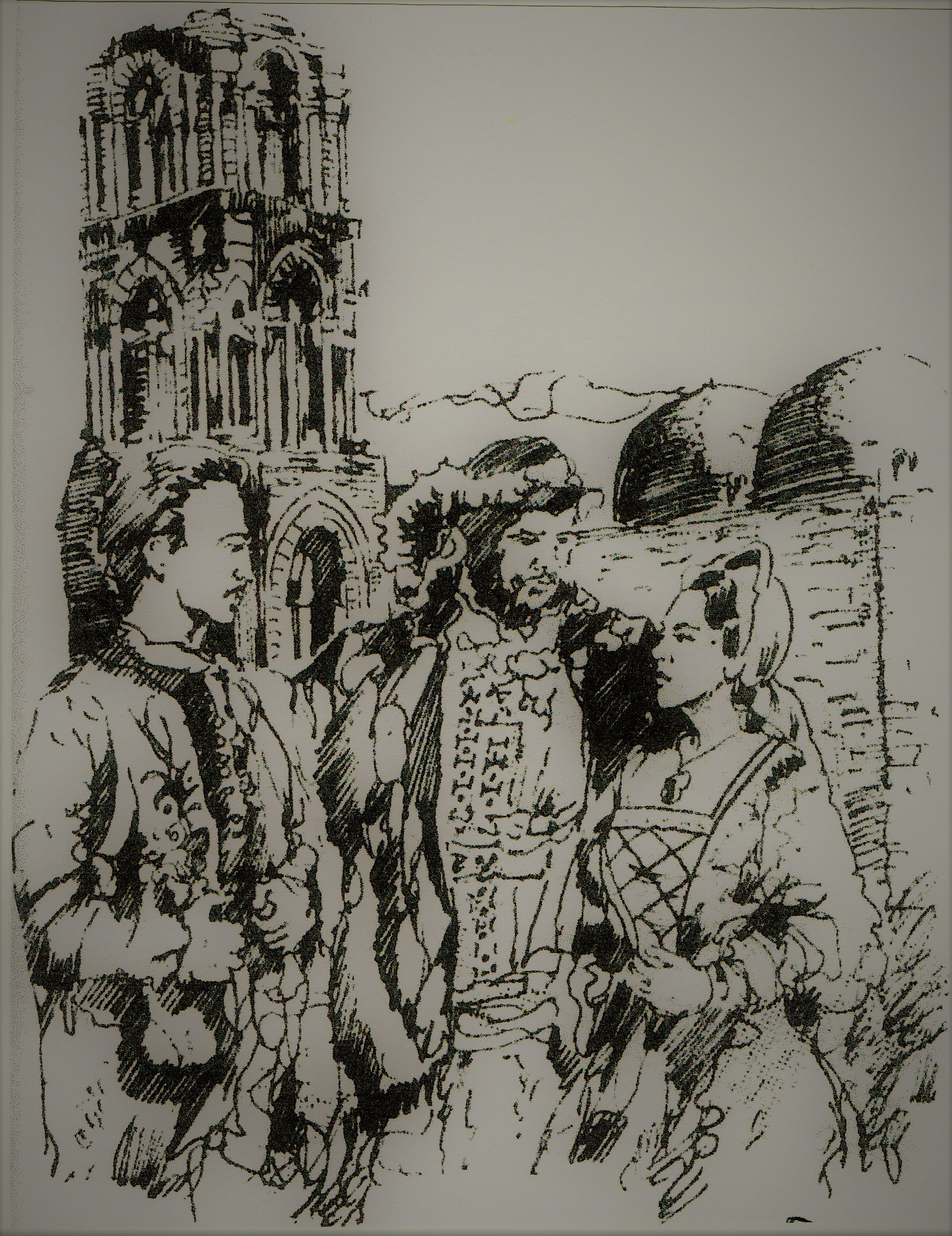
- Macalda (right) and Alaimo (center)

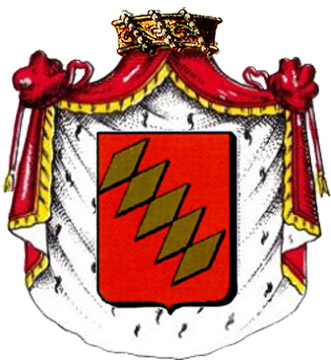
- Coat of arms
- Born: circa 1240; Castle of Scaletta
- Died: after October 14, 1308? Castle Matagrifone, Messina
- Noble family: Lentini
- Spouses: Guglielmo Amico; Alaimo da Lentini
- Issue: Tommaso, Alanfranco (second marriage)
- Father: Giovanni di Scaletta
- Mother: a noblewoman of the Cottone family
- Occupation: Countess consort of Buccheri, Butera, Odogrillo, and Palazzolo Acreide

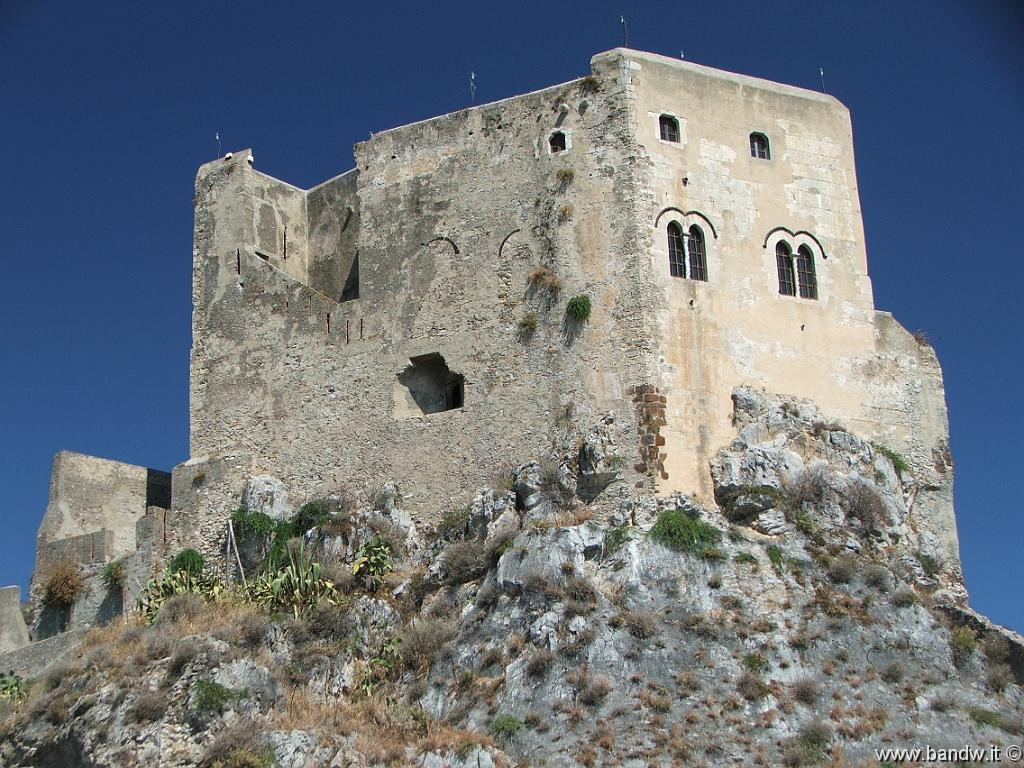
The castle of Scaletta, where Macalda was born

Macalda di Scaletta (or Machalda; c. 1240 in Scaletta Zanclea – after October 14, 1308? in Messina) was a Sicilian baroness and lady-in-waiting during the Angevin and Aragonese periods. The daughter of Giovanni di Scaletta and a Sicilian noblewoman, Macalda was noted for her political conduct, inclination to betray marriage (political and human), and for her promiscuous sexual habits; because of this dissoluteness, even having a brush with "suspicion of incest," tended to morph into an "exhibitionism veined with nymphomania." She was the wife of the Grand Justiciar of the Kingdom of Sicily, Alaimo da Lentini.

Reportedly ambitious, judicious, and educated in matters of the military, Macalda deployed her influence first in the circle of Charles of Anjou and then at the court of Peter III of Aragon, whom, according to a chronicler of the time, Macalda tried to seduce, but without success. She lived in a time of upheavals in the Kingdom of Sicily, which were marked by the bloody revolt of the Sicilian Vespers, and which led to the change from Angevin to Aragonese rule.

Practicing intrigue at court, but also vying with Queen Constance of Hohenstaufen, Macalda had a role in at first favoring, and then toppling, the political fortunes of her second husband, the Alaimo da Lentini, who had been one of the major champions of the Sicilian Vespers.

Macalda's career has left behind a recognizable historical trace, though variously treated in the chronicles of her time. One of these, the Historia Sicula by the contemporaneous Messinese chronicler Bartholomaeus of Neocastro, is aggressive towards her character, but some suspect that the political motives influencing the pro-Aragonese Neocastro may not have been the only factor in his bitterness towards Macalda, and that he was "one of the victims of the woman's spell."

Besides her military education, Macalda is also noted for her ability to play chess, which was unusual for a woman of her time, and historical evidence suggests that she was probably the first person in Sicily who learned how to play it.

Her singular figure, inhabiting the pages of chronicle and history, is transfigured in the collective memory, in folklore, and in the collective imagination. Macalda became the protagonist of popular traditions, myths, and legends of Sicily, such as one in Catania about the well of Gammazita.

A distant echo of Macalda's passion for the Aragonese sovereign, which the chronicler Neocastro disseminated in caustic tones, also seems to reverberate in Boccaccio's storytelling, with an enormous difference of tones and accents, in a much more idealized and rarefied courtly and knightly context in the Decameron: the tale of Lisa Puccini's love for King Peter of Raona (Aragon).

== Lineage ==
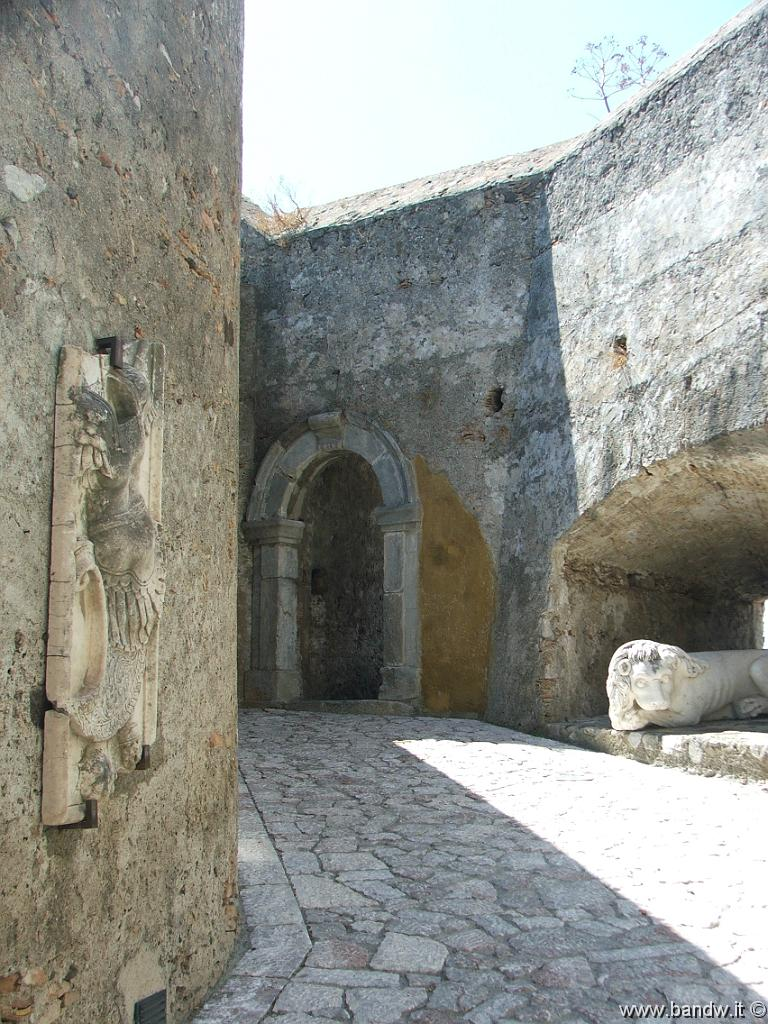
Interior of the castle of Scaletta

Her family initially experienced distressed economic conditions, from which they would be able to free themselves, due to a social rise whose apex would be reached by Macalda. Her great-grandmother led her existence exposed to the weather ("under the sun and the rain") in front of the Porta Judaeorum of Messina, where she sold food from a stall in the open. With this activity, the woman succeeded not only in making ends meet, but also in saving up some money.

=== Social and political rise ===
==== Grandfather ====
The son of the itinerant food vendor was Matteo Selvaggio ("who was surnamed 'savage'"). He became Macalda's grandfather. In the early 13th century, during the Swabian period, he was a servant or soldier employed by the custodian of the state palace of Scaletta, a stronghold built to control traffic on the road that led to Messina from the south, coming from Catania and Syracuse.

By 1220, after the castellan was dead, Matteo Selvaggio succeeded in being hired at his job by concession of Emperor Frederick II of Swabia. Matteo owed a further step forward to his discovery of treasure hidden inside his castle. Sloughing off the poverty in this way, he also wished to discard his surname. Claiming the noble title of Scaletta, Matteo sought to sanction his new advancement in status. His economic progress allowed him the possibility to send his son Giovanni to study law.

==== Giovanni di Scaletta, Macalda's father ====
This privilege of studies, as Neocastro wrote, was able to confer great prestige upon anyone who accomplished it. Thus it was that without fail that Giovanni opened up horizons and new opportunities, including the royal road of a highly placed marriage, sealed with a Sicilian noblewoman of the house of Cottone. From this marriage, two children were born in the castle of Scaletta: the firstborn was Matteo II, followed circa 1240 by his sister Macalda.

=== Macalda in the contemporaneous Aragonese chronicles ===
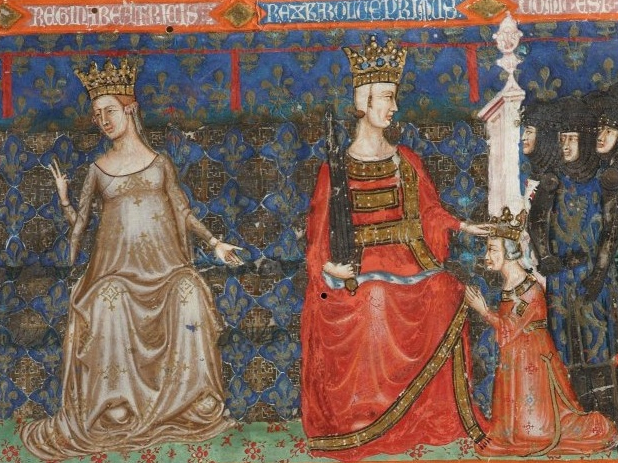
Beatrice of Provence with Charles I of Anjou

==== Bartholomaeus of Neocastro ====
Bartholomaeus of Neocastro, in his Historia Sicula, comes across as particularly hostile to her, inspired by political motives. After the success of the Ghibelline Vespers revolt, though being aligned with the victors, "Macalda represents the Sicilian nobles of Guelph tradition who had been prominent in the Communitas Siciliae, that ephemeral political experiment of island autonomy that had preceded the arrival of the Aragonese. However, there are those who believe that this alone is not enough to justify the chronicler's rancor; his narration on Macalda became "particularly poisonous, to the point of warranting suspicion that the austere and learned Messinese historian had been a victim of the woman's spell."

=== Catalan Chronicles: Bernat Desclot ===
Bernat Desclot, a Catalan chronicler who sided with Aragon, writes about her in more favorable terms. In chapter 96 of his Llibre del Rei en Pere, he describes her as "very beautiful and genteel, talented in her heart and her body, generous in giving and, at the right time and place, valorous in the use of arms on par with a knight." It has been delicately noted that Desclot in this passage had lightly corrected his draft with respect to the even more flattering tone used in a previous version of his chronicle, making a subtle sort of self-censoring for the sake of propaganda: in an early draft, indeed, Macalda was described as leyal (loyal); then, after the woman had fallen into ruin for her presumed conspiracy, this attribute was evidently no longer usable in a neutral way, so it was replaced by "beautiful."

==== Macalda's military virtues ====
On her military virtues, underlined by Bernat Desclot, and her martial bearing, the tradition on Macalda is unanimous. Other authors, agree in describing her as valorous in arms and capable of acquitting herself with heroic courage amid the dangers of war.

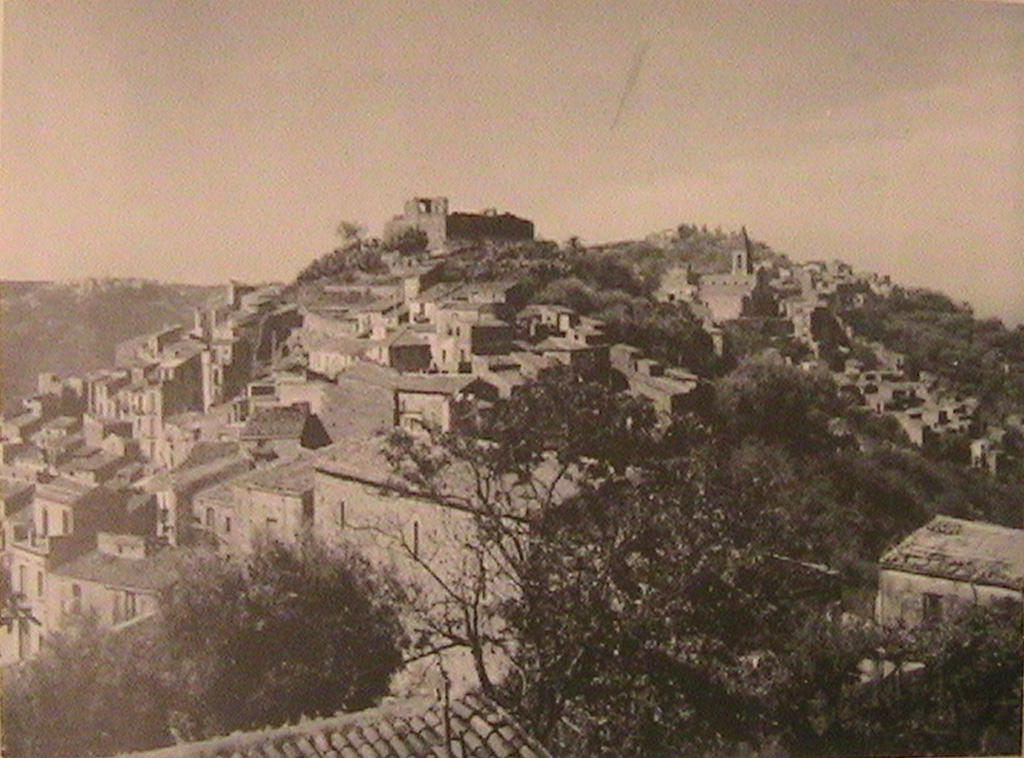
Ficarra with Macalda's castle atop

== First marriage with Guglielmo d'Amico ==
The very young Macalda was taken as wife by Guglielmo Amico, who once had been baron of Ficarra, but was then despoiled of property and exiled in the time of the Swabians. It was just this state of reduction to misery that gave Macalda and her family the possibility of getting a marriage with a titled noble. Even Guglielmo, for his part, counted on getting some usefulness from this second marriage; his hope, having then become disappointed, was that which would allow him to gain back possession of his lost feudal holding of Ficarra.

However, his expectations were revealed to be poorly placed: Guglielmo Amico fell into disgrace and ended his existence reduced to poverty. Macalda had no remorse: without regrets she abandoned her husband dying in the Templars' Hospital, and began wandering for some time, wearing the habit of a friar minor, sojourning in various provinces between Messina and Naples, and exhibiting behavior that was not impeccable. In Naples, particularly, the widow would be entwined in an incestuous relationship with a relative. Having gone back to Messina, she slipped unrecognized into the house of another relative, with whom she committed to a new sexual relationship that verged on incestuous.

Finally Macalda, by the will of King Charles, even succeeded in getting confirmation of her ownership of the property claimed in vain by her now dead husband, Guglielmo d'Amico.

== Second marriage with Alaimo da Lentini and involvement in the Vespers War ==
Again by royal will, Macalda was given in marriage to Alaimo da Lentini, who at the time was quite influential in Angevin circles. His first marriage had been with another woman also named Macalda.

When Alaimo's splendors at the Angevin court were about to decline, it was thanks to the maneuvers of his intriguing wife that he managed to rebuild his reputation, at first with the Sicilians, becoming one of the principal instigators of the Sicilian Vespers (a revolt that his consort also adhered to), and then at the Aragonese court.

Once the revolt had broken out, in the situation that saw Alaimo leave to defend Messina from the siege, Macalda became the governor of Catania, acting in lieu of her husband.

On that occasion, Macalda made herself the leading figure in Catania by an unscrupulous betrayal of the French who had rebelled against her in the clamor of the Vespers: after having feigned a gracious welcome, she stripped them of their property instead, and then left them to the mercy of the enraged people.

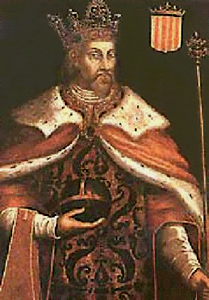
Peter III of Aragon, King of Sicily 1282–85, King of Aragon 1276–85

The ambitious Macalda seemed to be aiming much higher to realize her designs for power. The Sicilians had besought Constance of Hohenstaufen, daughter of King Manfred, to accept the crown of Sicily, as the last of the Hohenstaufens. The queen's consort, Peter III of Aragon, supported the initiative and prepared to land on the island.

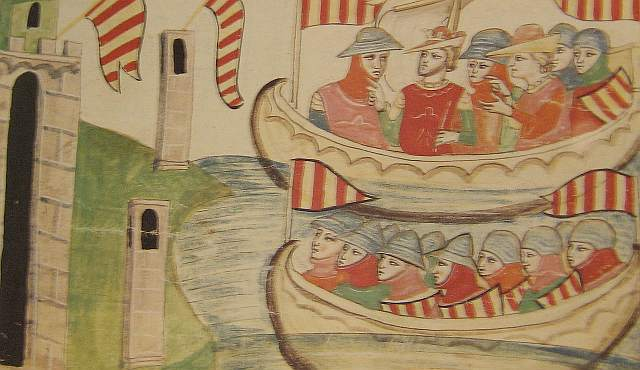
Peter III (recognizable by his crown) with his wife Constance, the heir to the throne of Manfred of Sicily, commands the landing at Trapani of the Aragonese fleet on August 30, 1282. Miniature from the Nuova Cronica by Giovanni Villani (from a manuscript at the Biblioteca Vaticana)

=== Taking aim at Peter of Aragon ===
Still during the period of the Vespers, but following the arrival of Peter of Aragon in Sicily, rises an intrigue sketched out by her with the purpose of getting herself the role of the king's "favorite," an episode that casts further light on her unscrupulous arrivisme.

Indeed, at that time, once she learned of the Aragonese arriving in Randazzo, Macalda presented herself to them in great pomp, adorned with superb military attire, holding a silver mace in her hand, animated by intentions of sexual lust that were soon made explicit. Brought in front of the king, she addressed these words to him:

Latin	English
Ego sum Machalda Alaymi militis de Leontino, expectans regnum tuum, sicut et ceteri Siculi; dies hec felix, dies hec mihi consolacionis et gaudii est, qua Siciliam propter te Dominus de sui miseria liberavit.	I am Macalda, wife of Alaimo, a soldier of Lentini, awaiting your reign like all other Sicilians. This happy day is one of great consolation and joy for me when, by your action, the Lord has liberated Sicily from her misery.

Bartholomaeus, Historia Sicula

The king was avoiding amorous adventures at the time; he feigned that he did not understand her intentions and, honoring her and treating her with courtesy, personally conducted her to the inn with an escort of knights. Peter's behavior did not make Macalda give up: by pretending not to understand, she began to follow the Aragonese in his itinerary across the island.

When the king reached Furnari, near Milazzo, it was nighttime. An old man, in a state of indigence and looking miserable, covered with rags of leather, accosted him and was granted an audience. It was the Messinese Vitale del Giudice (Vitalis de Judice), formerly a friend and crony of Manfred, then reduced to a state of begging because of the consistent fealty he had cultivated for the Swabian dynasty.

The old man warned the king of the volatility of political alliances in Sicily and, in particular, of the inconstancy of Alaimo, who had already betrayed Manfred and Charles of Anjou, but made even worse by conditioning and intrigues that, according to the white-haired beggar, he was subjected to by Macalda and by her wicked father, Giacomo Scaletta. The king did not seem to give much weight to this and gently dismissed him, saying that his desire in that land was to make friends and not to cultivate or foment suspicions over past events. The next day, however, remembering the warnings of that vindictive old man, he decided to detoxify the atmosphere, proclaiming amnesty for anyone who was tarnished by political offenses.

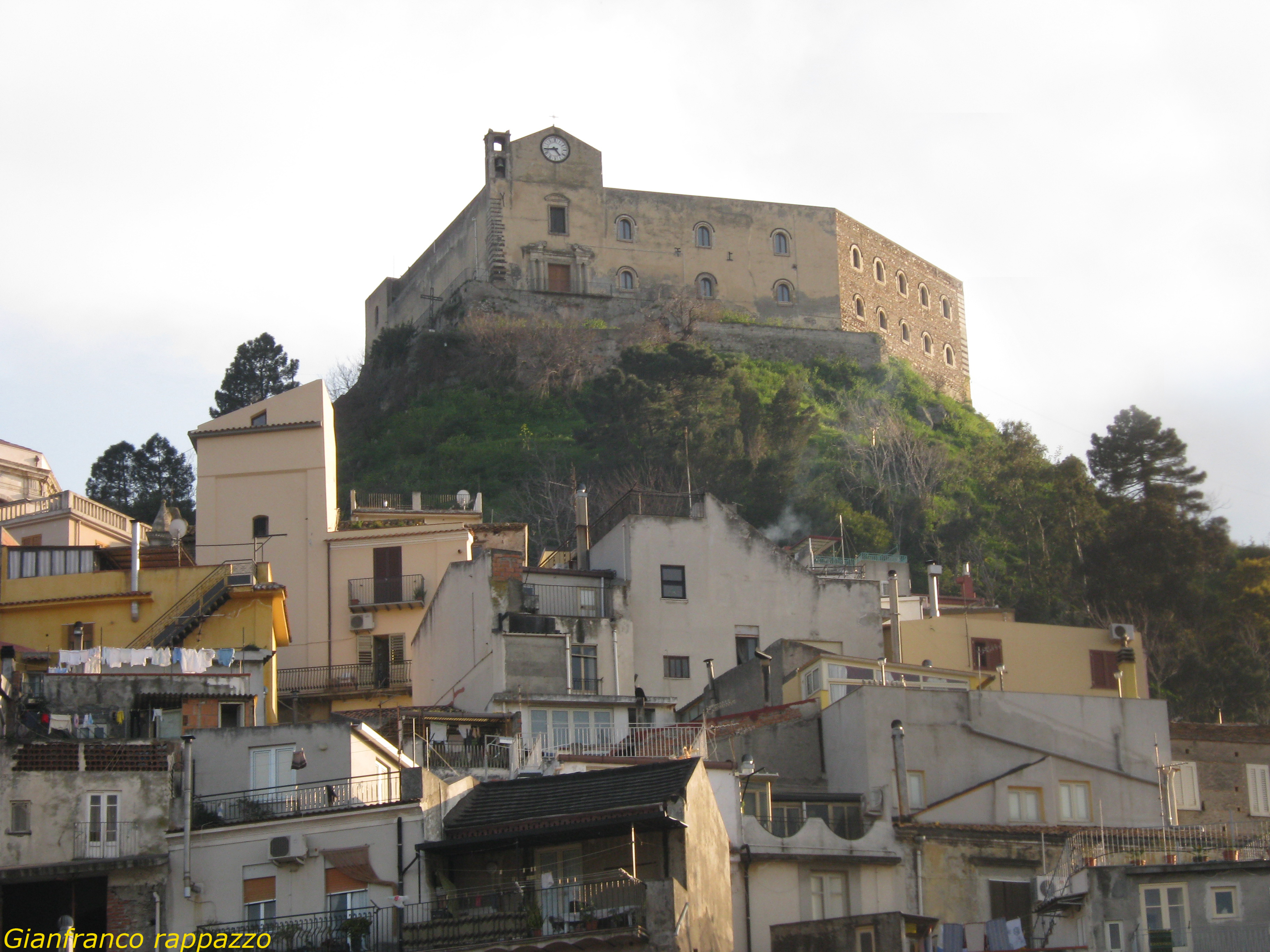
The castle of Santa Lucia del Mela

At Santa Lucia del Mela, Macalda asked for hospitality from the king, who was quartered in the local castle, giving as a reason the lack of inns in that small village, since she had been the last to get there. The king then allowed her two rooms but, not wanting to be tricked, moved to an inn, where he was again seen arriving by the insistent Macalda. Once again the king declined the advances of the woman: he called his majordomo and tried to take his leave for the night. But in front of the insolence of Macalda, who remained glued to her chair, he decided to get free of the embarrassment by calling the proprietors and their family members into the room and entertaining himself with that audience in various conversations and digressions, among which he made a show of his proven marital fidelity. The meeting went on until dawn, until the king had to go out in arms and took leave of all his visitors, frustrating the opportunity pursued by the woman.

=== Macalda and Alaimo at the court of the King of Sicily ===
Macalda and Alaimo took part in the new court, so intimate with the king as to be admitted to sit at his table.

Alaimo, by intent of the king, had a top-level role: when Peter left the kingdom for France, having to face King Charles in the famous duel of Bordeaux that would never take place, the Aragonese king chose Alaimo, as chief justiciar, and Giovanni da Procida, as chancellor, to support the two regents, Queen Constance and James the infante. Alaimo was thus the only Sicilian in a government where Constance had the delicate task of managing, mediating, and healing the political tensions and the pushes for autonomy going through the island, the same tensions and aspirations of which Alaimo, already Captain of Messina during the time of the Communitas Siciliae, was "the most influential exponent." Moreover, the king entrusted to the care of Alaimo the very delicate task of the custody of persons and protection of the physical well-being of his family members.

=== Rivalry with Constance of Hohenstaufen ===
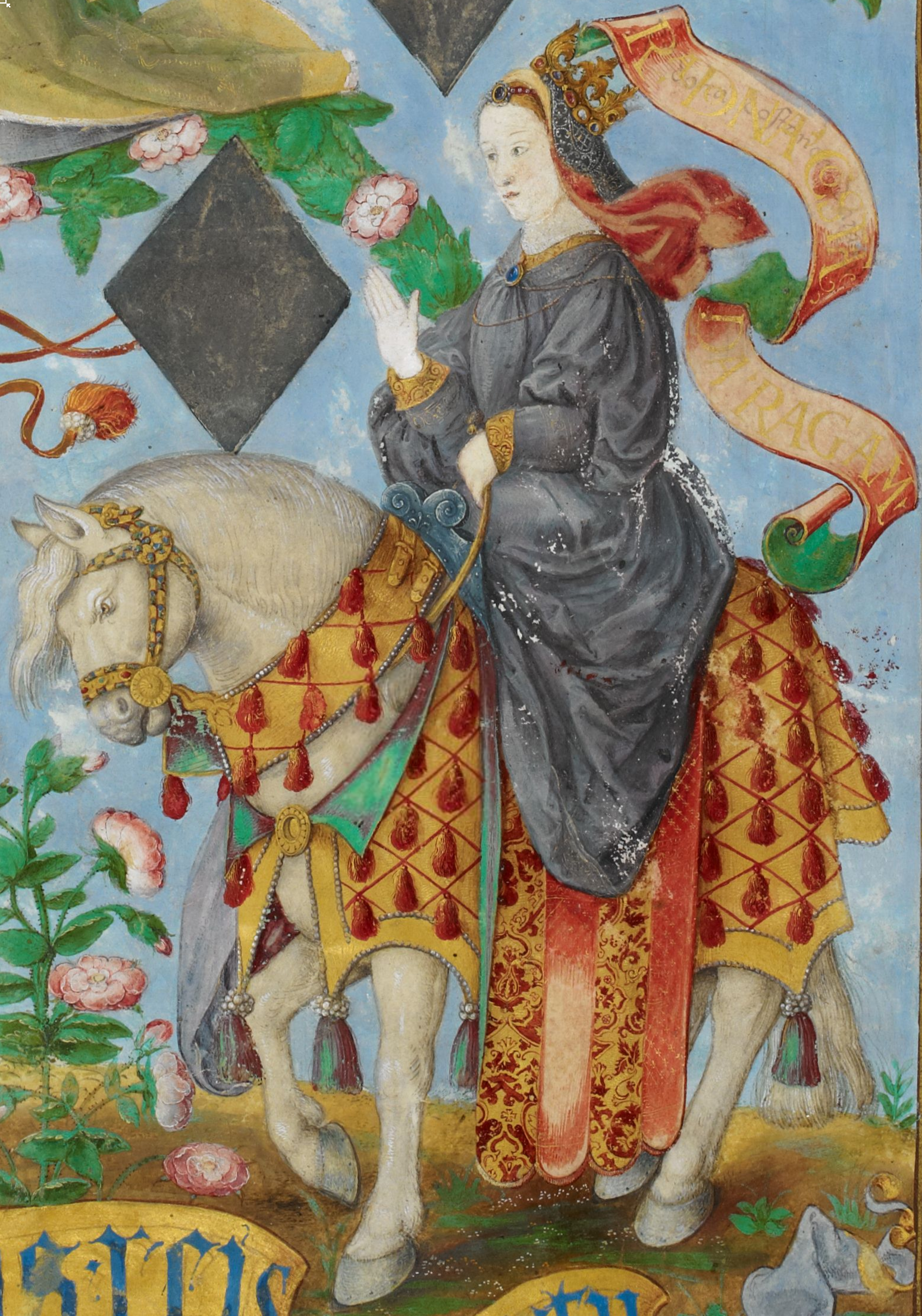
Queen Constance II of Sicily

But the defeat inflicted on her by Peter of Aragon's ostentatious marital fidelity gravely wounded her feminine pride, inciting Macalda to vindictive behavior, with acts of jealousy and emulation toward the court and particularly toward Queen Constance. Macalda began to defy her openly, acting like a royal highness, and made a show of snubbing and degrading going so far as refusing to call her "queen," and limiting her, in her haughtiness, to the reductive title "mother of James."

Thus Macalda inaugurated a season of mad and extravagant rivalries with the royal highnesses, which led her to refuse the queen's benevolence; she carefully avoided attending her, though not at the opportunities to vaunt a particular hairdo or to show off some special dress woven with imperial purple.

The episodes of this rivalry led to great scandal in the surroundings, putting the queen's kindness and proverbial patience to a severe test.

==== Relations between Macalda and Queen Constance ====
Some anecdotes about this one-sided rivalry have been handed down.

Once when she fell ill, the debilitated Constance went to the Cathedral of Monreale, entering Palermo on a litter instead of a horse as was her custom. Macalda did not miss the chance to emulate her: in perfect health and for no other reason, she paraded through the streets of Palermo on a luxurious litter festooned with scarlet cloth, held up on the unruly shoulders of some of her husband's soldiers and peasants from her country. On the way back to Catania she did the same while entering Nicosia, burdening the reluctant bearers as far as forcing them to stand still for a long time exposed to the weather.

Having become pregnant, Macalda began to lament a presumed state of infirmity, thanks to which she demanded and got the power to live in the monastery of the Friars Minor. According to her, this cohabitation was necessary to guarantee the tranquility she yearned for, far from the clamor of the people, but this forced proximity between the sacred and her controversial profane figure appeared scandalous to most.

A little after giving birth, Macalda made herself the protagonist in a new affront to Queen Constance. Together with her sons James and Frederick, Constance was invited by Alaimo to hold the newborn baby at baptism, two weeks from then. Macalda feigned hesitation, claiming the excuse that the baby's fragile constitution, according to her, was not able to bear the water of the baptismal font. But three days later, without any other valid reason, she had him baptized publicly in person, held by the people, blatantly snubbing the royal offer.

On another occasion, writes Bartholomaeus, the infante James, under the regency of Constance, set out to review the districts of the island accompanied by thirty knights. Macalda, as was her custom, quickly stepped in to accompany him, but she wanted to do it with her usual arrogance, acting "as much a justiciar as her husband," escorted by a cortege comparable in splendor but immensely greater in numbers, and of a rather dubious appearance: the entourage she had with her numbered "three hundred sixty men at arms, of doubtful faith or suspicious, deliberately gleaned from various lands," a large company of brigands, a band of disorderly troops, more than a cortege of knights.

These behaviors of hers were also to induce her fall from grace, and to favor and accelerate that of her husband Alaimo.

== Alaimo's fall into disgrace and the arrest of Macalda ==
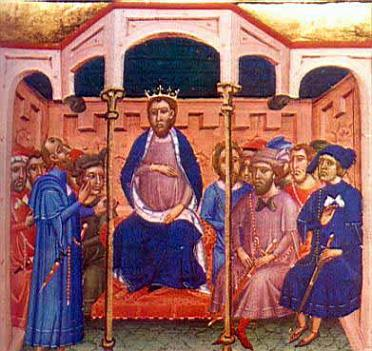
James II, principal adversary of Macalda and Alaimo

The event that caused Alaimo's reputation to plummet was in the end his indulgent behavior toward the Prince of Salerno, Charles the Lame, son of Charles I of Anjou. By now fallen into disgrace, suspected of conspiracy, Alaimo ran into the strong hostility of James II of Aragon: bombarded by weakly-founded accusations, he was told by James to go see King Peter in Aragon. He left for Barcelona on November 19, 1284, and was met with a cordial welcome by the king, by whom he was, however, held under such strict surveillance that he could be considered a prisoner.

Alaimo's departure threw his entourage into turmoil and meanwhile gave his opponents the chance to identify and prosecute his presumed accomplices. In 1285, correspondence that he had secretly carried on with the King of France was disclosed by the lawyer Garcia di Nicosia, who was promptly murdered by Alaimo's nephews in the desperate attempt, later revealed to be futile, to exonerate Alaimo's position by silencing Garcia forever.

So upon Alaimo's departure there followed arrests that ended up getting Macalda too. She was imprisoned in the castle of Messina, together with her children, on February 19, 1285, shortly after her husband's departure. Just before that, a much worse fate had befallen her brother Matteo junior, executed in Agrigento on January 13, 1285, by decapitation at the edge of an axe.

Alaimo was held back in Catalonia for a long time, protected by the sincere benevolence that he could still enjoy from Peter of Aragon. As long as Peter was alive, he was saved from every peril.

=== Execution of Alaimo ===
Once the King of Aragon was dead, Alaimo did not survive the loathing of James II, who convinced his elder brother Alfonso III of Aragon to hand him over. So on August 4, 1287, Alaimo was entrusted to only one of James's emissaries, Bertrand de Cannellis, who quickly headed back to Sicily. Without yet seeing fulfilled the proper claim to defend himself in a regular process, together with his nephews (including Adenolfo da Mineo), he was put on the ship that was ostensibly going to take him back to Sicily. But, unknown to him, his fate had already been sealed before leaving: when the journey reached its end near Marettimo, he and his nephews were led unawares onto the bridge of the ship, by which time Sicily was already on the horizon. So they saw fulfilled their hope of seeing their homeland again, but right after that was read out the sentence of death pronounced against them by James, which was summarily executed by drowning. Rolled up in sheets and weighted with ballast, Alaimo and his nephew Adinolfo da Mineo were thrown alive into the sea, following the ritual known as mazzeratura.

== Epilogue ==
With the story of Macalda and Alaimo, the trajectory of the Vespers was used up too. The precise awareness of this unforeseen metamorphosis can be gathered from the disconsolate Macalda's bitter words from the prison on the turn of events, addressing Roger of Lauria, the Aragonese admiral, brilliant for his military command but known for extreme avidity and for a cruelty that appeared unusual even for that time. He had come to visit her in prison in order to regain the papers of the feudal holding of Ficarra to which he laid claim. Boldly addressing the admiral, Macalda expressed her own bitterness like this:

Here we are, rewarded by Peter your king. We have called upon him and made him our companion, not just our lord. But, with the dominion in his hand, he treats us his comrades like servants.

(Bartholomaeus of Neocastro, Historia Sicula, ch. 91)

=== Macalda the chess player ===
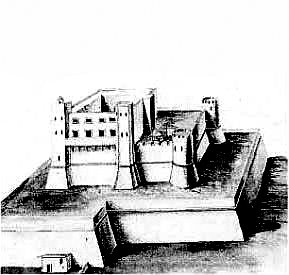
The castle Matagrifone (Rocca Guelfonia), prison of Macalda and the emir Ibn Sebir, site of their chess games

Macalda's captivity allowed another of her unexpected qualities to be revealed, that of chess player: we know in fact that, during her imprisonment in the Matagrifone castle of Messina, Macalda entertained herself at the game of chess with the Emir of Djerba, Margam ibn Sebir, who was also held in prison after being captured fleeing to Tunis while trying to escape the naval incursion on the island of Djerba by the admiral Roger of Lauria.

Also in these encounters, the haughty Macalda did not fail to astonish the bystanders and her jailers with the sensation caused by her "vivacity and the immodesty of her garments" that she flaunted.

Historical evidence suggests that she was probably the first person in Sicily who learned how to play chess. It would in fact take another two and a half centuries, until the time of the Holy Roman Emperor Charles V of Habsburg, to have the first three historical mentions by Pietro Carrera of Sicilian chess players: the Palermitans Armini and Branci, and Don Matteoli Genchi of Termine, author of some stanzas on the rules of chess play.

=== Death of Macalda ===
From the time of her imprisonment, after the information on her proud address to Roger of Lauria and her entertainments in the prison of Matagrifone, practically every trace of Macalda is missing from the chronicles of the day, a silence that has warranted historians' presumption of her death a few years later. Still, there exists an archival document that records her as still living there on December 3, 1307, when Macalda Scaletta, probably facing financial difficulties deriving from her second widowhood, signed a contract by which she rented to a certain Mastro Pagano Barberio, for a term of 22 years, the service and work (servitia et operas) of Anna, one of her servants of Greek origin (ancillam de Romania).

One other mention is in a legal document of October 14, 1308, in the State Archives of Palermo, in which Macalda is noted as living. So October 14, 1308 is the terminus post quem for the woman's death, which some authors instead place in 1305, while others, like Michele Amari, suppose that it happened in prison shortly after her arrest.

== Macalda in imagination and literature ==
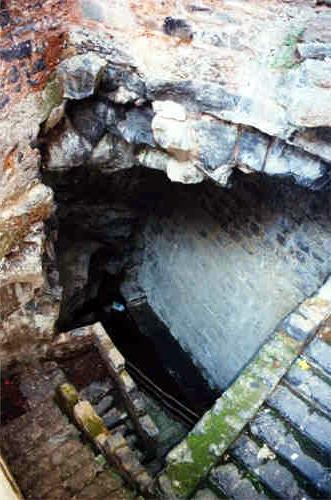
The Well of Gammazita, connected with the Catanese legend of the same name, at the Castello Ursino

=== Legend of the well of Gammazita ===
The story of Macalda has entered the popular imagination: she populates myths, traditions, and popular legends, such as one in Catania about the Well of Gammazita.

=== The Decameron ===
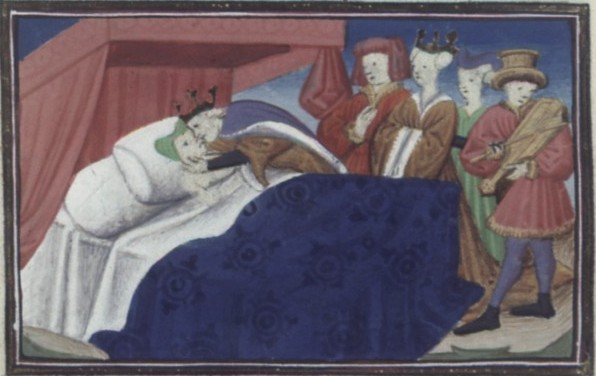
King Peter, with Constance behind, kisses the ailing Lisa Puccini in the novella of Pampinea from the Decameron, a distant echo of Macalda's amorous transport for the king

A distant echo of Macalda's passion for the Aragonese king survives in the tale of Lisa Puccini and her forlorn love for King Piero of Raona in the novella narrated by Pampinea during the tenth day of Boccaccio's Decameron.

Enormous, however, is the disparity of accents that separates the "poisonous" chronicle of Bartholomaeus from the Boccaccio episode, in a context suffused with lingering courtly and knightly virtues that are better suited to the figure of King Peter, known for his virtues of "prudence" and his "knightly soul" that contributed to leave a "vast record in the literature of the time" about him.

It is also possible that, in Bartholomaeus, the version of the anecdote was the fruit of a malevolent elaboration, to validate or justify a posteriori the ill-fated role that Macalda had in persuading Alaimo di Lentini to the presumed betrayal: this could also explain the different treatment that Desclot reserves for Macalda's falling in love with the Aragonese sovereign in his Catalan chronicle.

The fact then that Boccaccio, not knowing of Desclot's work, came to know of a similar story could indicate that a courtly version of the anecdote was circulated, perhaps orally, in various locations, being transformed through the typical routes of oral tradition, before reaching the ears of the Decameron's author.

=== Nineteenth century: theater, music, literature ===
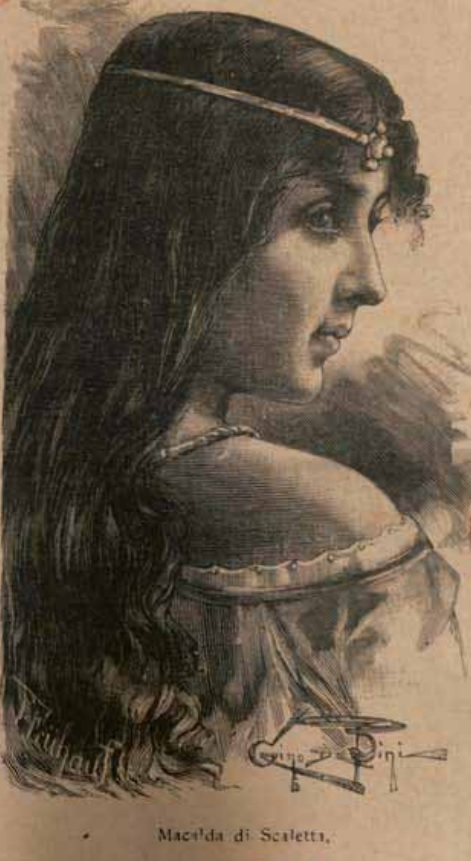
An 1889 sketch of Macalda by Gino De' Bini

In the second half of the nineteenth century, the figure of Macalda received a fair amount of attention. A German play was dedicated to her in 1877, a tragedy in five acts by the poet Hermann Lingg, who the year before had dedicated the historical drama Die Sizilianische Vesper to the tumultuous years of the Vespers uprising that form the background of the woman's story. Lingg's tragedy Macalda was then translated into Italian: the first version appeared in Messina in 1883, the work of Alessandro Bazzani, printed by Tipografia Fratelli Messina.

Around 1880 appeared "Macalda: Melodrama for Piano" by the Veronese musician Angelo Bottagisio (1842–?), a minor but successful artist in the panorama of nineteenth-century Italian music, who also composed the opera Alaimo da Lentini, produced at the Fraschini Theater of Pavia in 1885.

A romanticized history of Macalda's life and loves is included on pages 797–811 of an 1889 book, Le Grandi Amorose, illustrated by 70 drawings by Gino de' Bini, the work of Italo Fiorentino, an author who inserts a popular vein into his copious literature, of uneven quality, that nourished a real and proper literary genre of that period in literature, called "romance of the mysteries." Fiorentini's book is a collection of literary portraits of femmes fatales, from the mysterious and dissolute lives, famous lovers, and concubines of rulers and men of power. The book was published in Rome in 1889 by Edoardo Perino.

== Bibliography ==
- Michele Amari, La guerra del vespro siciliano; o, Un periodo delle istorie siciliane del secolo XIII, Volume I, Tipografia Helvetica, 1845
- Michele Amari, Racconto popolare del Vespro siciliano, Rome, 1882
- Bartholomaeus of Neocastro, Historia Sicula
- (in Catalan) Crònica del Rey en Pere e dels seus antecessors passats per Bernat Desclot, ab un prefaci sobre'ls cronistas catalans per Joseph Coroleu, Cap. XCVI, Edició 1885
- (in Catalan) Llibre del rei Pere (critical edition) in Crònica del rei Pere by Stefano Maria Cingolani, who conjecturally attributed it to Galceran de Tous)
- Vito Amico, Dizionario topografico della Sicilia, Volume 2, translated from Latin by Gioacchino Di Marzo, Ed. Salvatore di Marzo, 1859
- Santi Correnti, La Sicilia del Seicento, società e cultura, Mursia, 1976
- Nicolò Francesco d'Alessandro, Macalda di Scaletta Baronessa di Ficarra, MR Editori, Trentola Ducenta (CE), 2015.
- Francesco Giunta, "Alaimo (Alaimus, Alaimu, Alamo) da Lentini (di Latino, di Leontino)", Vol. I, 1960, in Dizionario Biografico degli Italiani, Istituto dell'Enciclopedia Italiana Treccani.
- Carlo Alberto Garufi, "Alaimo di Lentini", Enciclopedia Italiana (1929), Istituto dell'Enciclopedia italiana Treccani
- Ingeborg Walter, "Costanza di Svevia, regina d'Aragona e di Sicilia", in Dizionario Biografico degli Italiani, Istituto dell'Enciclopedia Italiana Treccani
- Piètro III il Grande re di Aragona, II di Catalogna, I di Sicilia", Enciclopedia biografica universale, Vol II, Istituto dell'Enciclopedia Italiana Treccani
- Andreas Kiesewetter, Lauria, Ruggero, in Dizionario Biografico degli Italiani, Istituto dell'Enciclopedia Italiana Treccani, (online)
- Marinella Fiume, Siciliane: Dizionario biografico, E. Romeo, 2006 ISBN 978-88-7428-057-5
- Salvatore Fodale, Il povero, in Condizione umana e ruoli sociali nel Mezzogiorno normanno-svevo, Edizioni Dedalo, 1991 ISBN 88-220-4143-7
- Mariarosaria Palmieri, "C'era una volta Macalda", Ed. Guida, Napoli 2010.
- Salvatore Tramontana, Gli anni del Vespro: l'immaginario, la cronaca, la storia, Edizioni Dedalo, 1989 ISBN 88-220-0525-2
- Steven Runciman, The Sicilian Vespers: A History of the Mediterranean World in the Later Thirteenth Century, University of Cambridge Press, 1958. ISBN 0521437741
- Pietro Carrera, Il gioco de' scacchi, 1617
- Fabio Massimiliano Germanà, Breve storia degli scacchi a Messina, 2011
- Clifford R. Backman, The Decline and Fall of Medieval Sicily: Politics, Religion, and Economy in the Reign of Frederick III, 1296-1337, Cambridge University Press, 2002 ISBN 978-0-521-52181-9
- (in Catalan) Stefano Maria Cingolani, Historiografía, propaganda i comunicació al segle XIII: Bernat Desclot i les dues redaccions de la seva crònica, Institut d'Estudis Catalans, 2006 ISBN 978-84-7283-841-3
- (in Catalan) Ferran Soldevila i Zubiburu, Pere II el Gran: el desafiament amb Carles d'Anjou, Estudis Universitaris Catalans, IX (1915-1916)
  - Monograph, on the missing challenge of Bordeaux between Peter of Aragon and Charles of Anjou, dating from the years of World War I and published later, under separate title, in 1919. Now in: Ferran Soldevila i Zubiburu, El desafiament de Pere el Gran amb Carles d'Anjou, Barcelona, 1960
- Archivio di Stato di Palermo, Miscellanea Archivistica:
  - II Serie, n. 127A, fol. 99 (December 3, 1307)
  - II Serie, n. 127B, fol. 52 (October 14, 1308)
- Giuseppe La Mantia, Documenti su le relazioni del Re Alfonso III di Aragona con la Sicilia (1285-1291), in Anuari de l'Institut d'Estudis Catalans, XI (1908), Barcelona, pp. 337–363
- Giuseppe La Mantia, Codice diplomatico dei re aragonesi di Sicilia: Pietro I, Giacomo, Federico II, Pietro II e Ludovico, dalla rivoluzione siciliana del 1282 sino al 1355. Con note storiche e diplomatiche, Vol. I (years 1282-1290), Palermo, Scuola tip. Boccone del povero, 1917
- Boccaccio, Decameron, Pampinea, X.7.
- Marchese, Dora (2018). L'Epica della Passione: La Sicilia di Macalda di Scaletta, Lisa Puccini e Gammazita. Catania: Carthago Edizioni. ISBN 9788894934038.

== See also ==
- Dina and Clarenza
