= Operation Sicilian Vespers =

Operation Sicilian Vespers may refer to:

- Operation Sicilian Vespers (1992-1998), the largest Italian Army homeland security operation since the end of the Second World War
- Operation Sicilian Vespers (2012), code name for the crisis, blockades and protests, lasting 5 days, that paralyzed Sicily in January 2012

== See also ==
- Sicilian Vespers (disambiguation)
