= Rapisardi =

Rapisardi is a surname. Notable people with the surname include:

- Mario Rapisardi (1844–1912), Italian poet
- Michele Rapisardi (1822–1886), Italian painter
