= Vespers (disambiguation) =

Vespers are the evening prayers part of the Catholic, Orthodox, or Lutheran prayer service.

Vespers may also refer to:

== Literature ==
- "Vespers", a poem in W. H. Auden's "Horæ Canonicæ" sequence, published in The Shield of Achilles (1955)
- "Vespers", a 1990 novel by Ed McBain
- "Vespers", a poem in A. A. Milne's 1924 collection When We Were Very Young

== Music ==
- The Vespers, a musical group from Nashville
- Vespers (album), by saxophonist Steve Lacy
- Vespers, an alternative title of the 1915 composition All-Night Vigil by Rachmaninoff
- Vespers, a 1968 composition by Alvin Lucier

== History ==
As a euphemistic term for massacres of specific population groups:

- Asiatic Vespers, the killing of Romans in Asia Minor in 88 BC by Mithridates VI of Pontus
- Niçard Vespers, the three days of popular uprising of the inhabitants of Nice in 1871 in favour of the union of the County of Nice with the Kingdom of Italy
- Sicilian Vespers, the killing of the French in Sicily in 1282 by the Ghibellines
- Sardinian Vespers, anti-Piedmont insurrection in Sardinia in 1794
- Adana massacre, the killing of (mainly Armenian) Christians by Muslims in 1909, sometimes called the Cilician Vespers
- Jérémie Vespers, the killing of the relatives of Haitian insurgents by government forces in 1964

== Other uses ==
- Vespers (video game), a 2005 interactive fiction game by Jason Devlin
- Vespers, a society in The 39 Clues book series that causes evil

== See also ==
- Sicilian Vespers (disambiguation)
- Vesper (disambiguation)
