= Vesper =

Vesper means evening in Classical Latin. It may also refer to:

== Places ==
- Vesper, Kansas, an unincorporated community in the United States
- Vesper, Oregon, an unincorporated community in the United States
- Vesper, Wisconsin, a village in the United States
- Vesper, an abandoned village southwest of Swift Current, Saskatchewan, Canada
- Vesper Peak, a mountain in Washington State, United States

== People ==
- Heike Vesper (born 1970), German marine biologist
- Iulian Vesper (1908–1986), Romanian writer
- Rose Vesper, member of the Ohio House of Representatives (1993–2000)
- Rudolf Vesper (born 1939), East German Olympic gold medalist in Greco-Roman wrestling
- Will Vesper (1882–1962), German author and literary critic

== Arts, entertainment, and media ==
- Vesper (novel), a young-adult novel by Jeff Sampson
- Vesper (film), a 2022 Lithuanian-French-Belgian science-fiction film directed by Kristina Buožytė and Bruno Samper
- Vésper, a pre-Revolution Mexican feminist weekly published by Juana Belén Gutiérrez de Mendoza and Elisa Acuña
- Vesper, an organization in the manga and anime series Mahoromatic
- Vesper, a banshee with unusually magical singing abilities from animated television series Mysticons
- Vesper Family, a family in the book series The 39 Clues
- Vesper Holly, a character from a book series by Lloyd Alexander
- Vesper Lynd, a character in the James Bond novel and film Casino Royale
- Vesper, a village in the Ultima series of video games

== Organizations ==
- Vesper Boat Club, an amateur rowing club in Philadelphia, Pennsylvania, United States
- Vesper Country Club, one of the first golf courses in the United States

== Science ==
- Vesper bat, the largest, best-known family of bats
- Vesper mouse, a rodent genus
- Vesper sparrow, a medium-sized bird
- Vesper (plant), a genus of plants in the family Apiaceae
- Vesper mission, a planned Venus chemistry and dynamics orbiter of the NASA Discovery Program

== Other uses ==
- Vesper (cocktail), an alcoholic beverage recipe popularized by Ian Fleming
- The Roman equivalent of Hesperus, the Greek name given to the planet Venus at sunset
  - Hesperus, the personification of the evening star Vesper in Greek mythology
- HMS Vesper (D55), a British destroyer in commission in the Royal Navy from 1918 to the 1920s and from 1939 to 1945

== See also ==
- Vespa
- Vespers (disambiguation)
- VSEPR theory in chemistry, often pronounced "Vesper"
