= Mategriffon =

Coordinates: 38°11′46.3″N 15°33′7.1″E

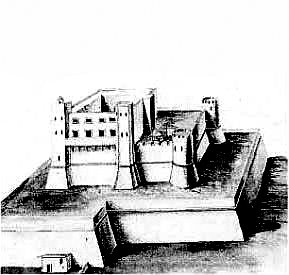
The Sicilian castle of Matagrifone (Rocca Guelfonia)

Mategriffon or Matagrifone or Mathegriffon or Rocca Guelfonia was a medieval castle in Messina, Sicily, located in what is today Viale Principe Umberto. Its strategic position upon a rocky hill close to the historic city centre gave a commanding view of the harbour and Strait of Messina. In the 19th century it was converted into a prison. Prior to its destruction in the 1908 earthquake it comprised a square dungeon with ramparts and reinforced by polygonal towers. Only an octagonal tower remains standing and is incorporated into the 20th century Shrine of Christ the King church, a visible Messina landmark which dominates its skyline.

The name Matagrifone signifies "Greek killers" or "kill-Greeks" due to the population of Messina having been predominantly of Greek ancestry.

== History ==
=== Medieval ===
Matagrifone was initially constructed as a wooden fortress in 1061 by the Norman adventurer Robert Guiscard, Lord of Sicily. It was upgraded in 1190 by Richard I, king of England during his sojourn in Messina as part of his journey to the Holy Land in the Third Crusade. He ordered its partial demolition before he departed in 1191 for the conquest of Cyprus. In 1240 King Frederick II, Holy Roman Emperor ordered the rebuilding of the castle in limestone. Documents of the period refer to a Castrum novum. It later passed to the Angevin dynasty.

In the aftermath of the Sicilian Vespers, the royal vicar Herbert of Orleans together with his family and the supporters of King Charles I of Naples took refuge in the castle which was besieged and damaged by the angry Messinese mob led by Alaimo da Lentini. However they were given safe conduct to leave the castle which was subsequently repaired. After the Angevins were driven out of Sicily, Matagrifone came under control of the new ruling dynasty, the House of Aragon. It became the residence of Queen Constance, consort of Peter III at the end of the 13th century.

In February 1285, Baroness Macalda di Scaletta, wife of Alaimo da Lentini, and her children were imprisoned in Matagrifone Castle by the orders of King Peter. It was there she became acquainted with another prisoner, the Tunisian emir Margam Ibn Sebir of Djerba, with whom she passed the time playing chess. According to historian Santi Correnti she was the first Sicilian woman to play the game.

In the late 15th century the castle was enlarged by King Ferdinand II of Aragon whose inscription was written in Latin in 1496 on the eastern side of the extant tower.

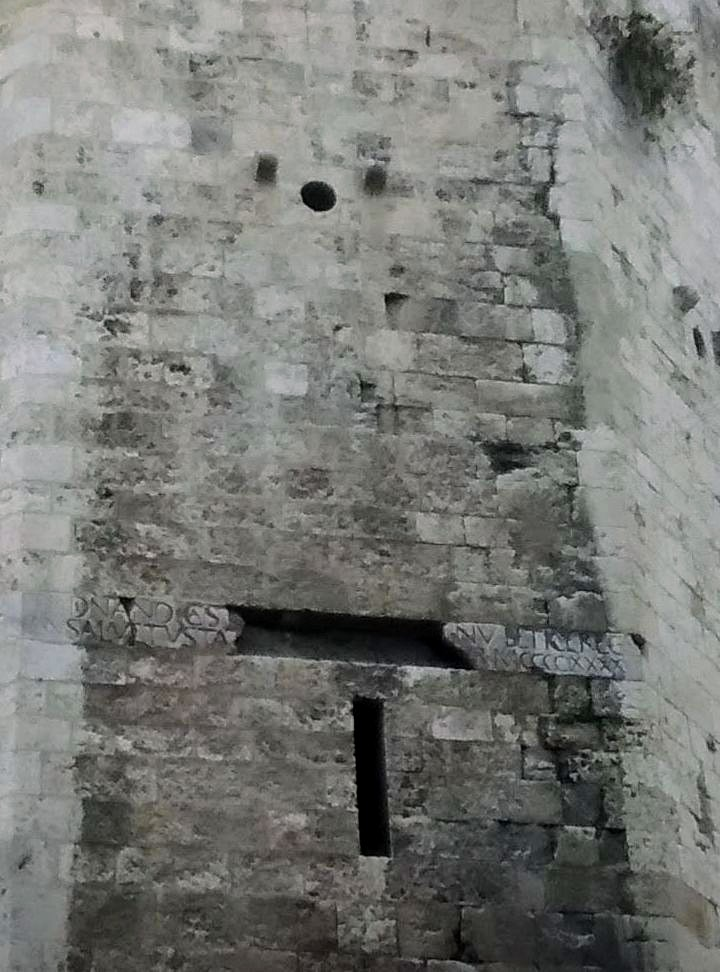
Inscription of Ferdinand II of Aragon dating from 1496 on the eastern side of the surviving tower

=== Modern era ===
The 16th century saw extensive fortifications added to the castle. In October 1535 following his conquest of Tunisia, Emperor Charles V made a triumphal visit to Messina where he stopped at Matagrifone Castle as part of his inspection of the city's fortresses. Over the following centuries it was a focal point of a number of rebellions against the ruling Spanish by the populace of Messina. Having suffered damage in the 1783 earthquake, in 1838 it was converted into a Bourbon prison which came under attack a decade later in the 1848 anti-Bourbon insurrection. The prison was described as having been "la prigione più dura e inospitale della città" (the toughest and most inhospitable prison in the city").

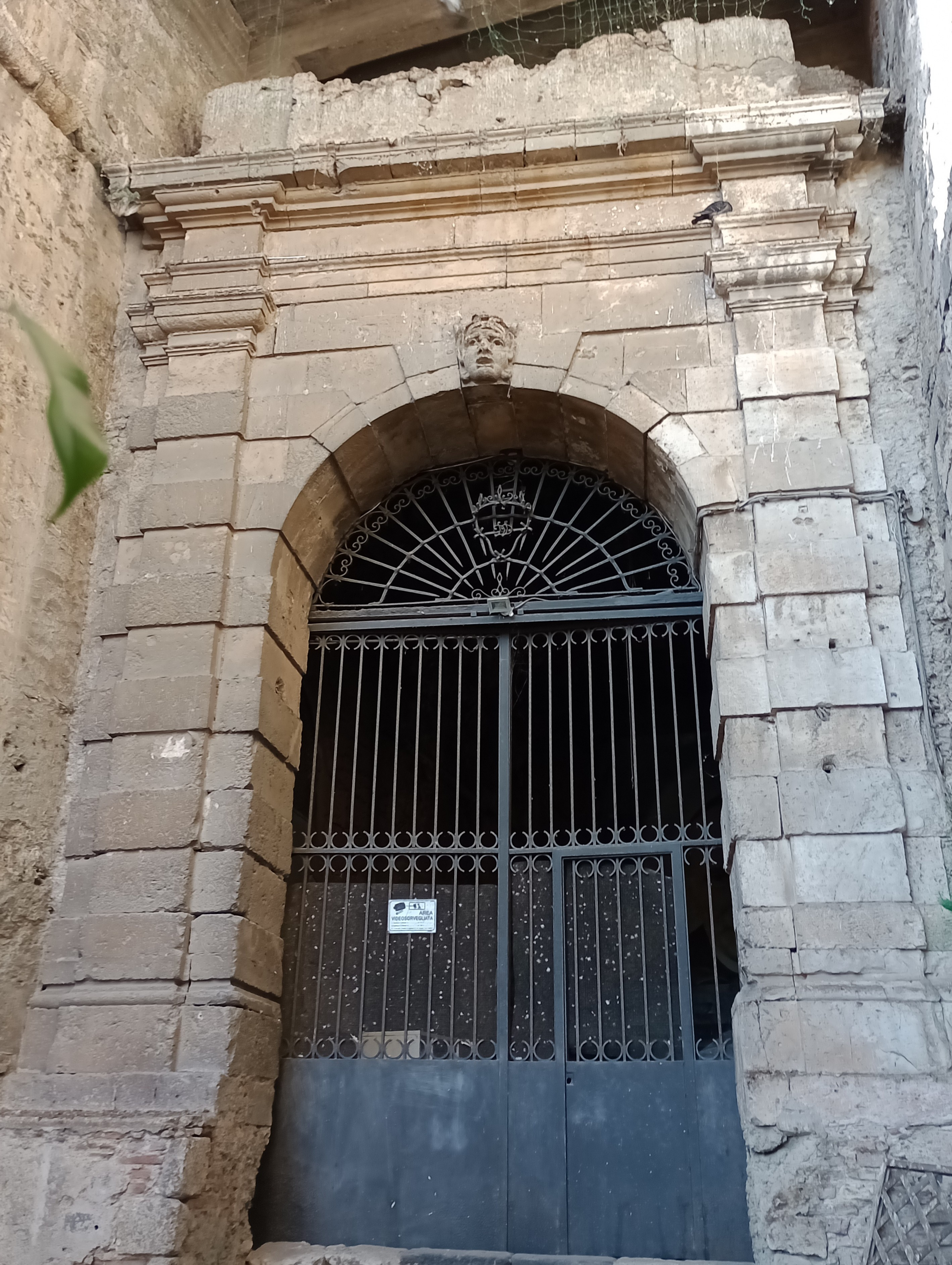
16th century entrance, located in Via delle Carceri

Matagrifone was almost completely destroyed in the catastrophic earthquake which struck Messina on 28 December 1908. Only an octagonal tower remains of the castle today, known locally as "Macalda's Tower", along with remnants of the bastion's walls and a 16th century entrance. It is surmounted by a 130 quintal bell made in 1935 from the melted bronze of enemy cannons. That same year the Shrine of Christ the King church and war memorial was built upon the castle ruins into which the tower is incorporated.

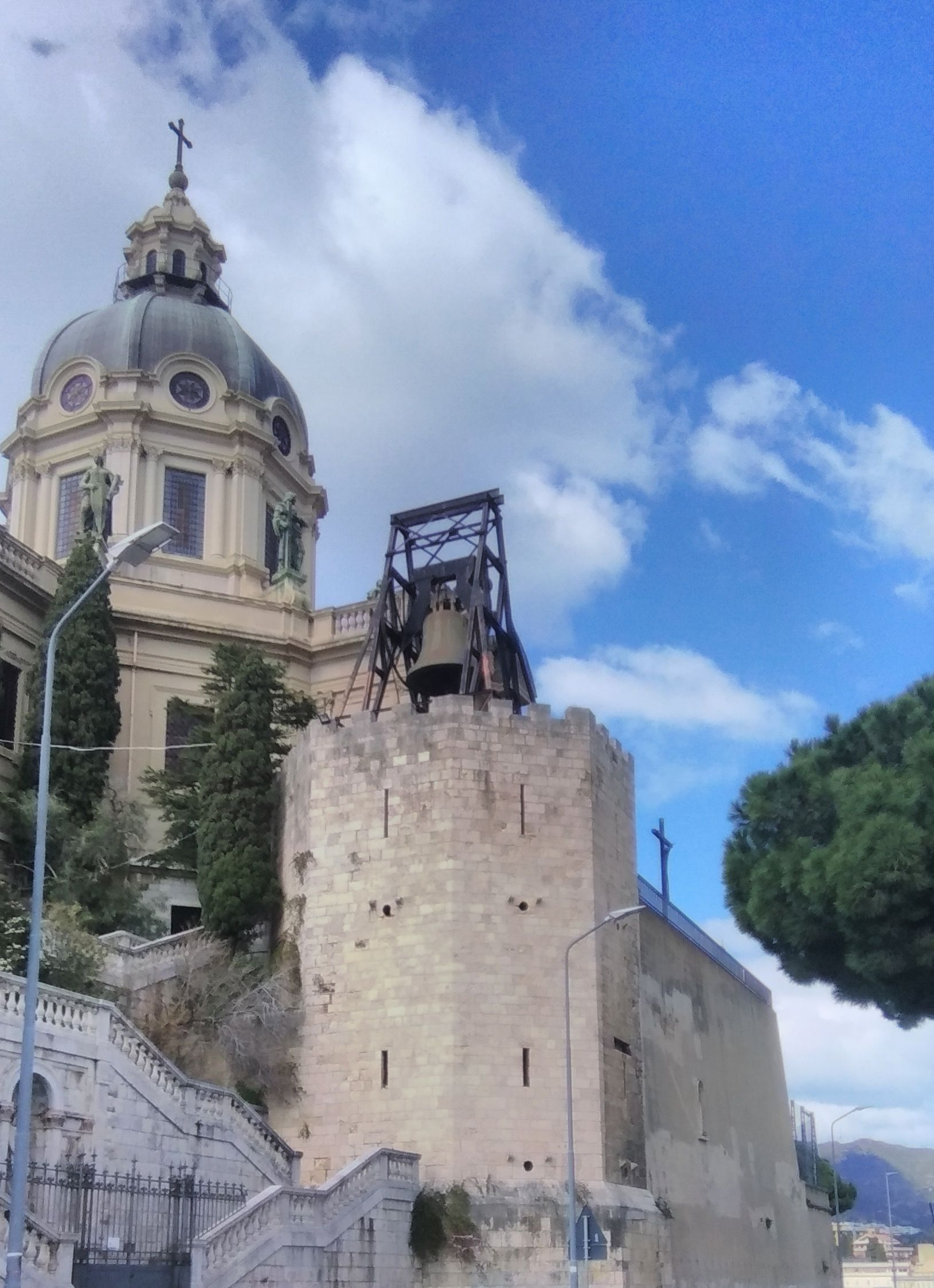
Surviving octagonal tower incorporated into the Shrine of Christ the King in Viale Principe Umberto

== Places with the same name ==
Mattegriffon was also an alternative name to the castle of Akova in the Peloponnese, which formed the seat of the Barony of Akova within the Principality of Achaea in the 13th and the 14th centuries.
