= Bartholomew of Neocastro =

Italian jurist and chronicler

Bartholomew of Neocastro (c. 1240 – after 1293) was an Italian jurist, and author of a chronicle called the Historia Sicula, which covers the years from 1250 to 1293.

Few things are known about Bartholomew. It is known that he was a bureaucrat from Messina who first practiced law before assuming bureaucratic assignments with the Aragonese court of the Kingdom of Sicily. These included several delicate diplomatic missions. It is in this position that Bartholomew was a direct and close witness to the narrated series of events. In some cases, he was a spectator from the inside.

== Historia Sicula ==
The Historia Sicula is a chronicle and work written in Medieval Latin prose about the story of the Kingdom of Sicily and Kingdom of Naples, taking place between the years 1250 and 1293. The work is important as it is the best known account of the Sicilian Vespers.

The work reflects the desires of the author to be witness to historical events that would change his homeland. It is written in Latin in prose. The narrative begins with the death of Frederick II of Swabia in 1250 to the summer of 1293. Much of Neocastro's work is lost, but his work was cited by Spanish historian Jerónimo Zurita y Castro (1512–1580) in his history of the Crown of Aragon, Anales de la Corona de Aragón.
