= Erulo Eroli =

Italian painter (1854–1916)

Erulo Eroli (August 31, 1854 – 1916) was an Italian painter.

He was born in Rome. His initial studies were in the Ospizio di San Michele in Rome under professor Ceccarini. He was able to win awards from his Institute and the Ministry of public education for Studio di un testa and Return to his family of a soldier wounded for his family. His painting of a Bacchante was awarded a silver medal at the Society of the Fine Arts in Rome. His works also include a candlelight painting titled Un Coro di Fanciulli and Gloria in Excelsis Ave Maria. The other painting by Eroli found in the Naval Academy of Livorno is titled La Palestro a Lissa, which had been exhibited at the 1883 Exposition in Rome. The subject was an episode during an 1866 battle between the Italian and Austrian navies. Other works included A tiger, Cornelio Puio, and some portraits of Cardinal Jacobini and il Suonatore Arabo.
