= Heike Vesper =

German marine conservation expert

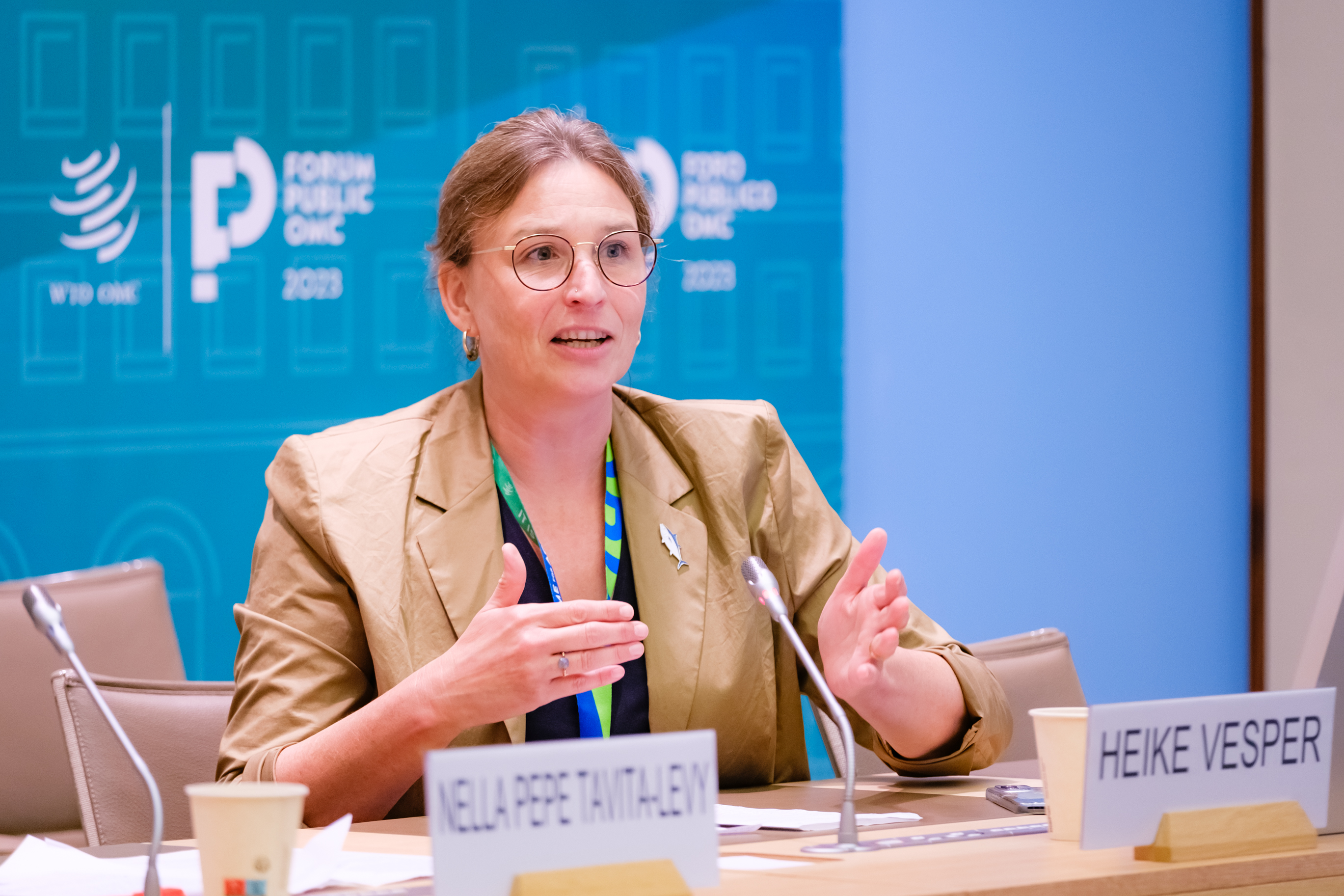

Heike Vesper (born 1970) is a German biologist and is the director of the marine program at World Wide Fund for Nature (WWF) in Germany. She is committed to conservation of endangered marine species and reducing the use of plastic packaging.

== Life ==
Vesper studied biology with a focus on marine biology and ecology in Bremen, Germany, with stations in Amsterdam and Jordan. She has worked with WWF Germany since 1999 and became the director of the International WWF Centre of Marine Conservation in Hamburg, Germany, in 2011. She has also served as the chairwoman of the board of directors of The Baltic Sea Conservation Foundation (baltcf) between 2014 and 2018. She was succeeded by Alfred Schumm after she stepped down as board member and chair.

In her capacity as a marine conservation expert, Vesper has advocated the conservation of overexploited marine species and the reduced use of plastic. In 2015, Vesper, along with Dr. Monica Verbeek (executive director of Seas at Risk) and Francisco J. Marí (Brot für die Welt), wrote a joint document,"Healthy Oceans are our Future", which outlined ocean proposals to the G7. She has spoken at the Digital Life Design Conference (2019), the Fashionsustain conference (2019), BMBF Forum for Sustainability (2017). In December 2018, she was featured in the Valeur Magazine issue 29, aimed at highlighting the stories of heroines of everyday life. On several occasions, Vesper has called for more action by the European Union in tackling the issue of plastic pollution in the ocean and has called for a "Paris Agreement for the Ocean" to combat ocean pollution. Vesper is a contributing writer on the blog of WWF Germany.
