= Michele Rapisardi =

Italian painter (1822–1886)

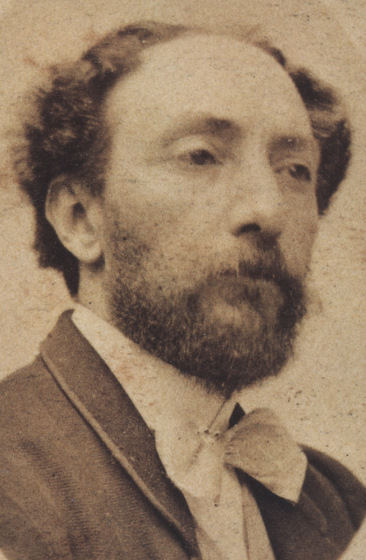
1860s photograph of Rapisardi

Michele Rapisardi (December 27, 1822 in Catania, Sicily – 1886 in Florence) was an Italian painter.

== Biography ==
Initially trained with his father, the painter Giuseppe Rapisardi, he then had a classic education locally in Catania, and then obtained a stipend from the city to study in the studio of Cavalliere Giovanni Costa in Rome. He won a number of prizes at the Accademia di San Luca.

After four years he traveled to Florence, Venice, then Paris. He was eclectic and prolific. He painted a number of genre works, based on history and drama: Episode of the 1301 Siege of Messina; Main Italian Poets at the Court of Frederico II in SiciIy; Vatti a far monaca!; Hamlet before Ophelia; La prima sventura di Luigi Camoens; Le castellane e il menestrello; Il trovatore cacciato in bando; Dante and Beatrice; The escape of Bianca Cappello; Le maggiolate; Mad Ophelia; and of the I Vespri Siciliani.

He painted religious works for a number of churches in his Catania, with paintings such as San Benedetto; L'Immacolata; La cena in Emaus; Il sacrifìcio di Gedeone; San Vito; Le Vergini di Sion; San Luigi Gonzaga; L'Addolorata; Sant'Agata in jail. Rapisardi was criticized for the anachronism of his costumes. He painted his self-portrait.

== Gallery ==
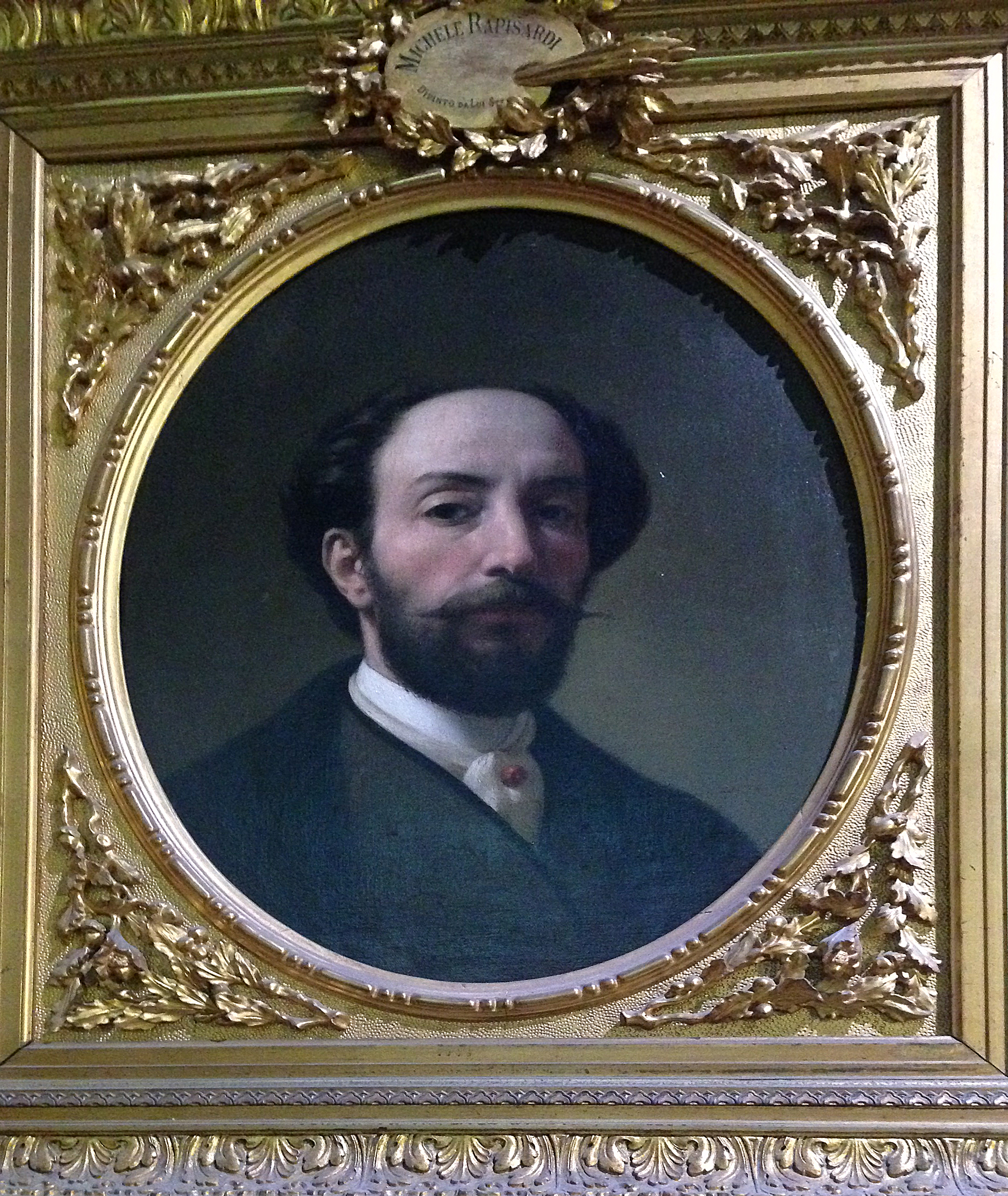
Self-portrait (Castello Ursino, Catania)

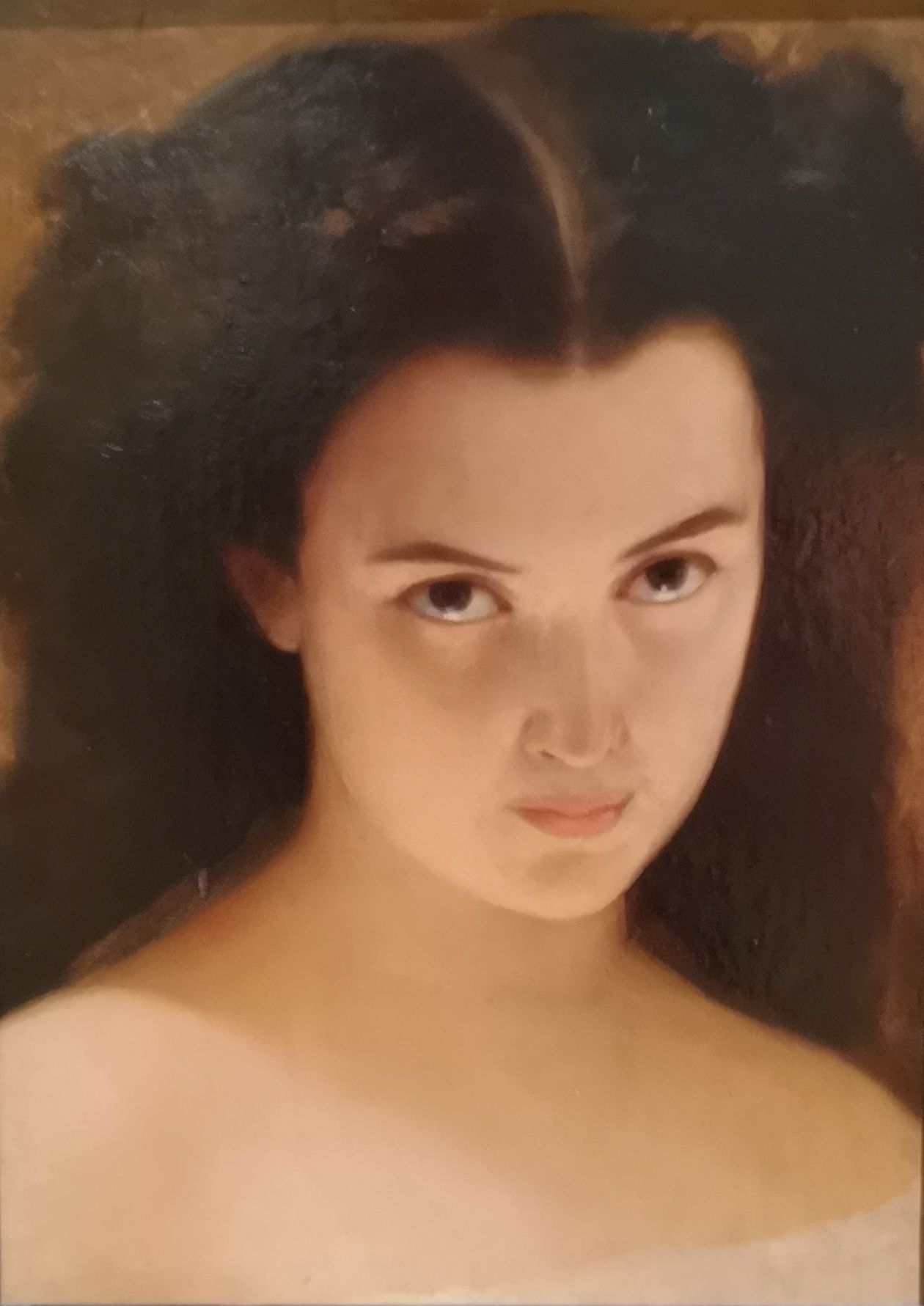
Head of the mad Ophelia

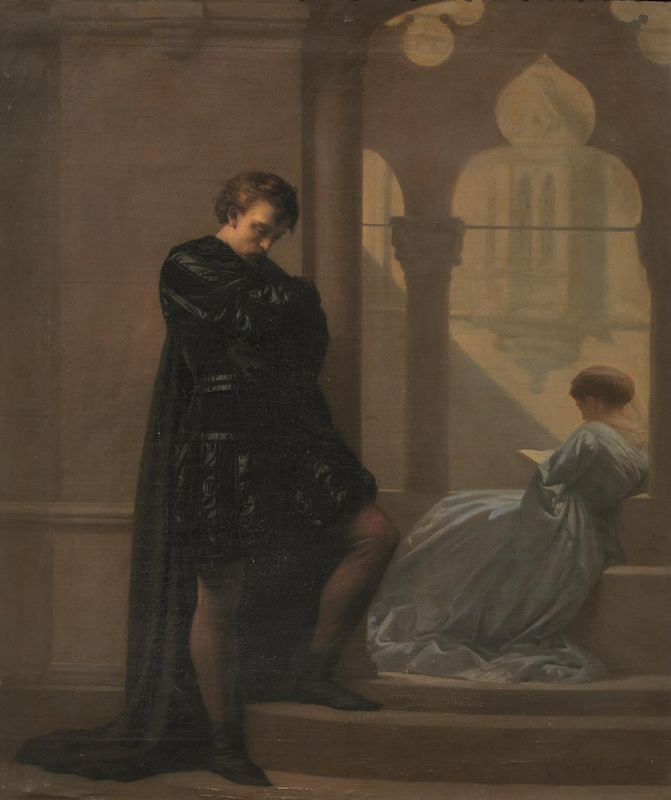
Hamlet

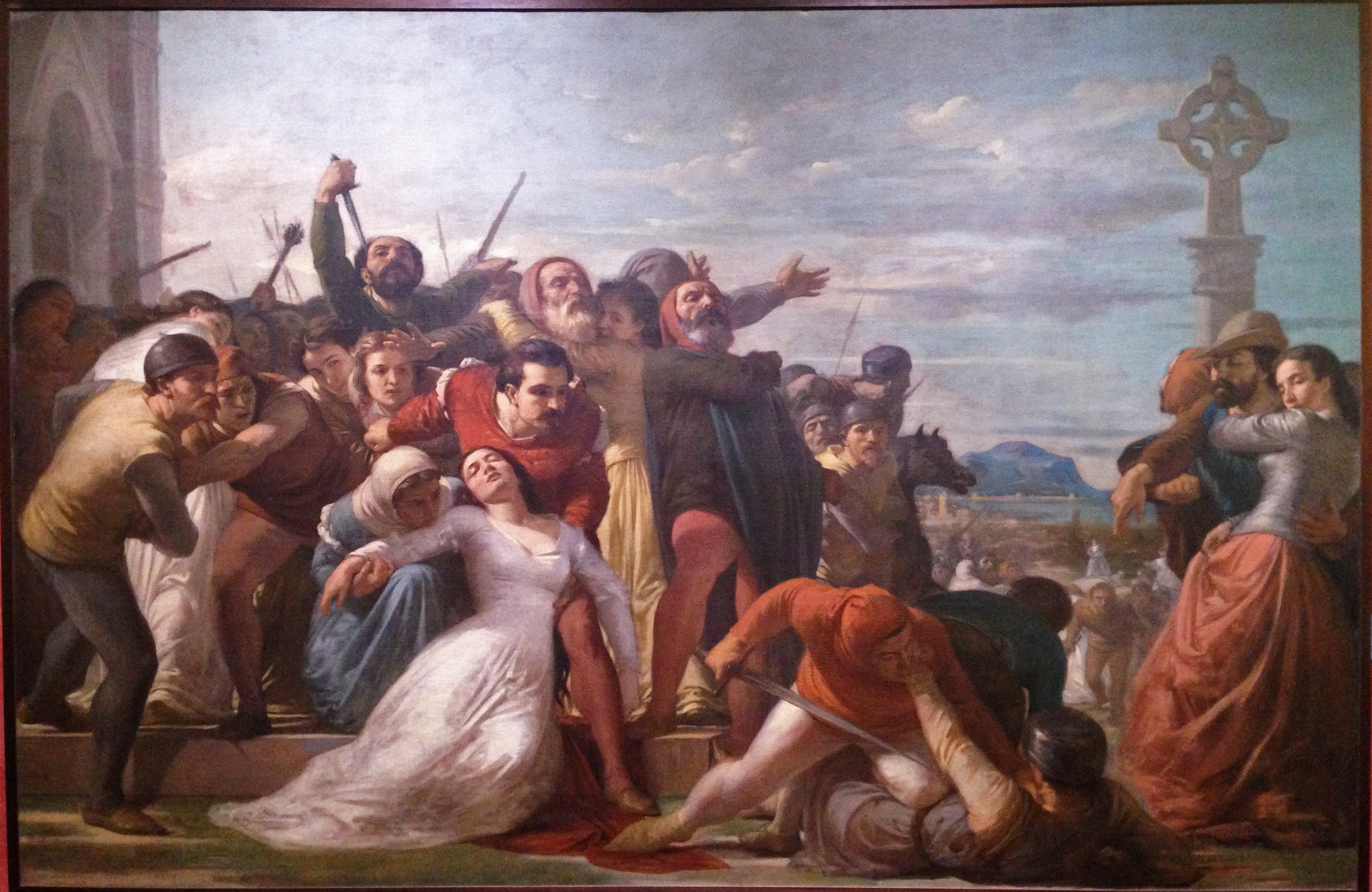
I Vespri Siciliani, Castello Ursino, Catania

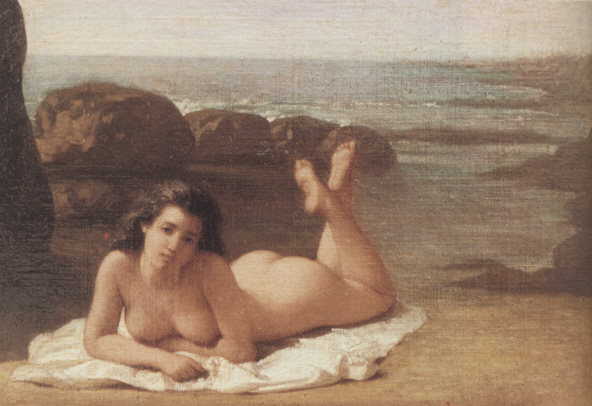
Siren

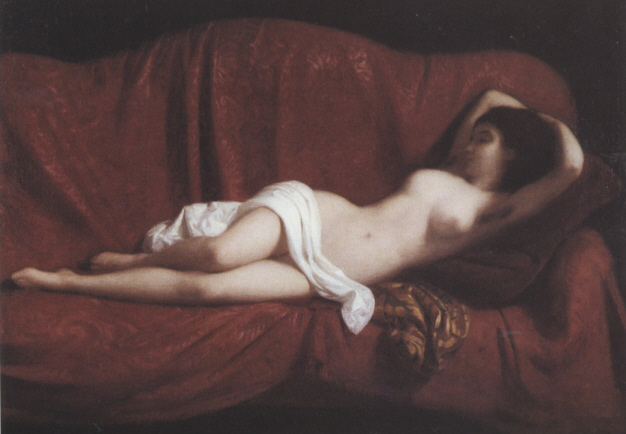
Venus in her Pink Divan
