= The Sicilian Vespers (Hayez) =

Three paintings by Francesco Hayez

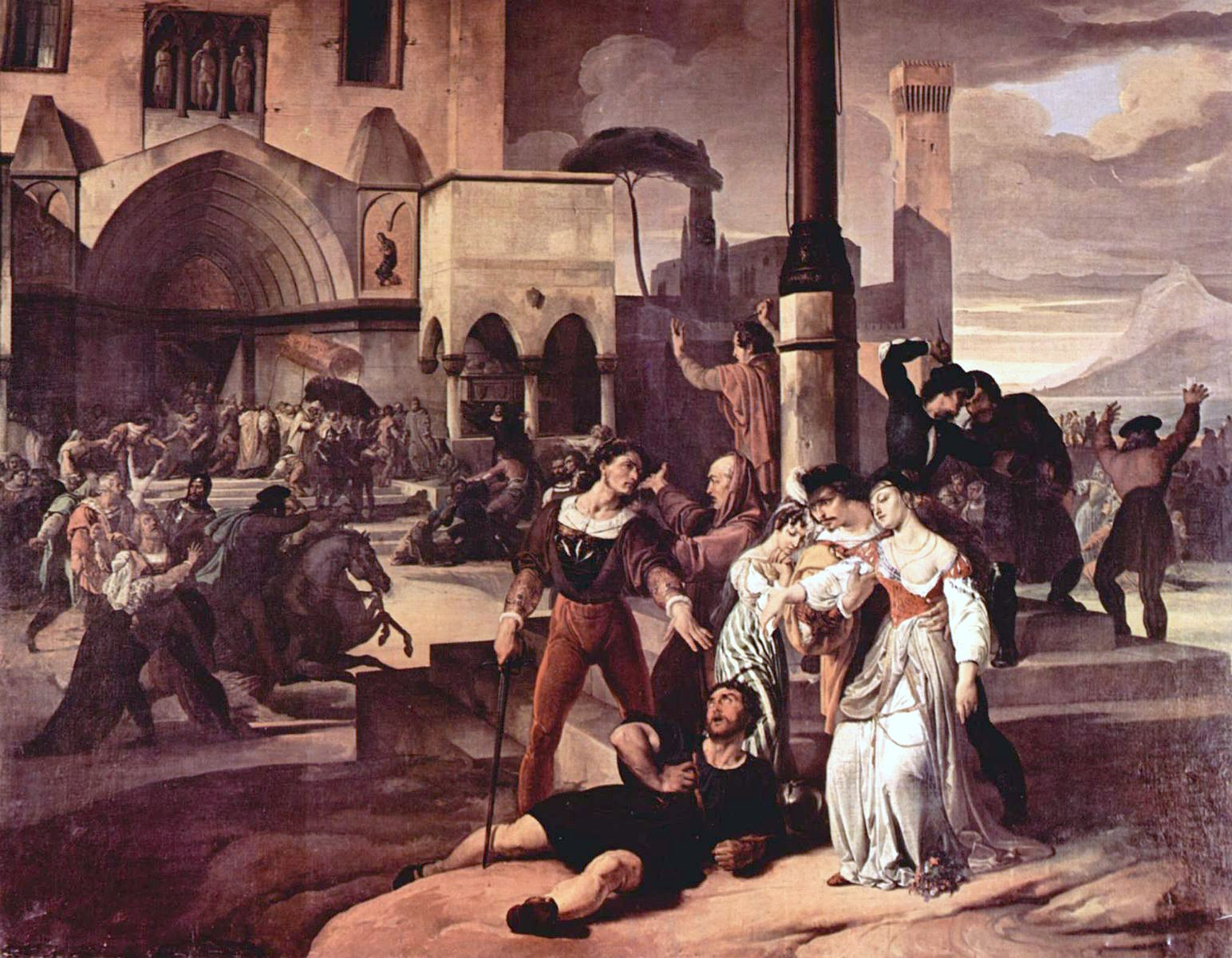
The Sicilian Vespers (1822 version) by Francesco Hayez

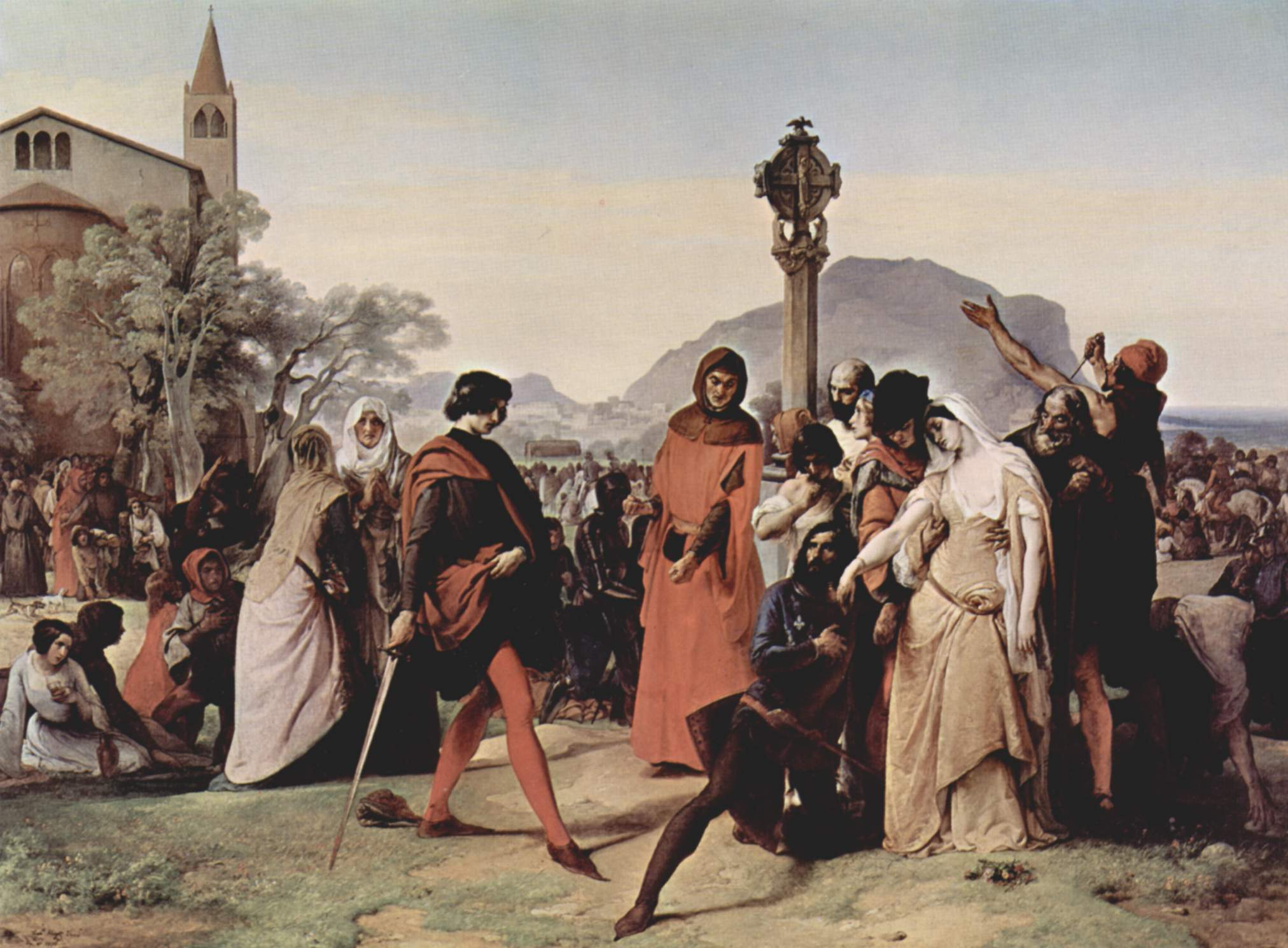
The third version of the work

The Sicilian Vespers is the title of three works by the Italian artist Francesco Hayez, all showing the outbreak of the Sicilian Vespers.

Measuring 150 × 200 cm, the first version was commissioned by the Marchioness Visconti d'Aragona. Hayez produced it in the Brera studio in Milan in 1822. The second version measures 91 × 114 cm and was commissioned in 1826–1827 by Count Arese, recently released from prison. Both versions are now in private collections, while the third version (225 × 300 cm), produced in 1846, is now in the Galleria Nazionale d'Arte Moderna in Rome. That version was produced for Vincenzo Ruffo, Prince of Sant'Antimo, Hayez's main patron. This painting and a portrait of Ruffo's wife Sarah Louise Strachan Ruffo were two of several paintings produced for Ruffo while Hayez was staying in the Ruffo family home in Naples.
