= Operation Sicilian Vespers (1992–1998) =

Italian anti-organized crime operation in Sicily

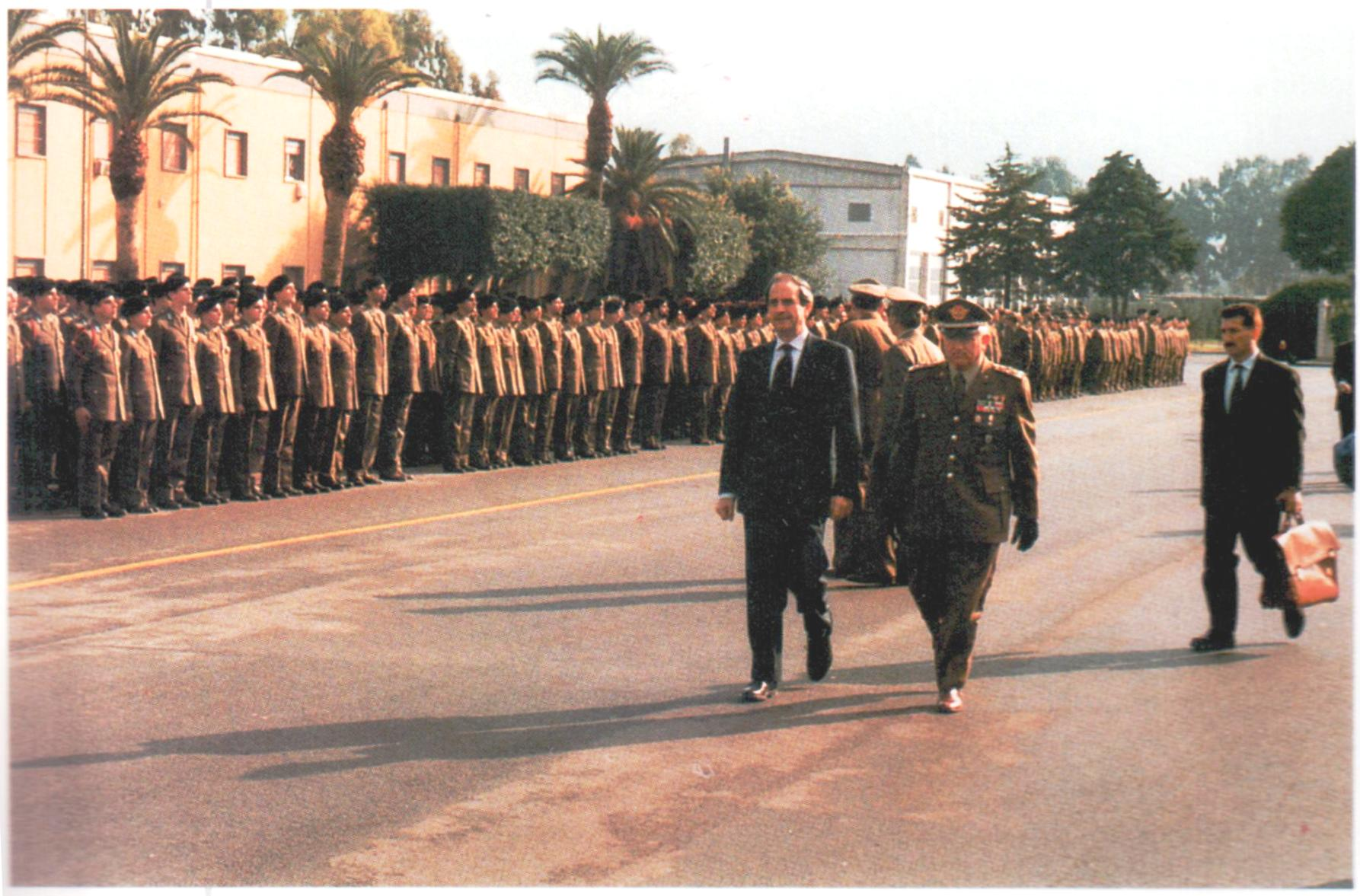
Minister of Defence Salvo Andò inspecting infantry deployed in Sicily in 1992–1993.

Operation Sicilian Vespers (Italian: Operazione Vespri siciliani) was a significant security and police operation in Sicily undertaken by the Italian Armed Forces between 25 July 1992 and 8 July 1998. The name of the operation refers to the Sicilian Vespers, the thirteenth century successful rebellion against the rule of the Angevins.

The operation was made necessary to support regular police forces in their fight against the organized crime in Sicily, primarily targeting the Cosa Nostra and Stidda crime syndicates, after the tragic series of events that bloodied Sicily until the beginning of the nineties, culminating on May 23, 1992, in the murders of Judge Giovanni Falcone, his wife and their police body guards, and on 19 July 1992 in the murders of Judge Paolo Borsellino and his police body guards.

The Operation Sicilian Vespers was the largest Italian Army homeland security operation since the end of the Second World War. After an initial deployment of 9,000 soldiers, during the 6 years of the operation were involved a total of more than 150,000 officers and soldiers.
