= Sicilian Vespers =

1282 rebellion in Sicily against King Charles I's rule

- Part of Guelphs and Ghibellines and War of the Sicilian Vespers
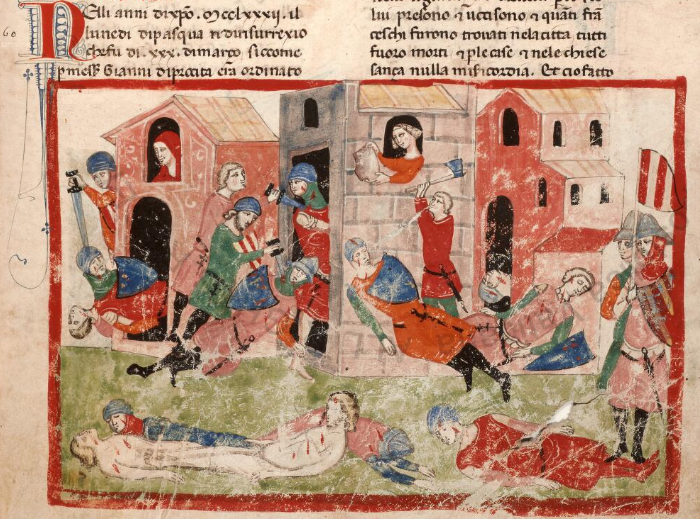
- Sicilian rebels massacre the French soldiers
Date	30 March – 28 April 1282
Location	Sicily 38°05′59″N 13°21′47″E
Result	Angevin regime overthrown: War of the Sicilian Vespers

Belligerents
Sicilian faction	Kingdom of Sicily

Commanders and leaders
John of Procida; Ruggiero Mastrangelo; Bonifacio de Camerana [it]	Charles I of Anjou; Jean de Saint-Remy †

Casualties and losses
	4,000 killed

The Sicilian Vespers (Italian: Vespri siciliani; Sicilian: Vespiri siciliani) was a successful rebellion on the island of Sicily that broke out at Easter 1282 against the rule of the French-born king Charles I of Anjou. Since taking control of the Kingdom of Sicily in 1266, the Angevin government had made itself unpopular with its exploitative policies and exclusion of native Sicilians from power.

Sparked by an incident in Palermo, the revolt quickly spread to the majority of Sicily. Within six weeks, approximately 13,000 French men and women were slain or expelled by the rebels, and the government of Charles lost control of the island. Seeking support for the rebellion, the Sicilians offered the throne to Peter III of Aragon, who claimed the crown on behalf of his wife, Constance of Sicily. The Aragonese intervention in the rebellion led to an expansion of the conflict into the War of the Sicilian Vespers.

== Background ==
=== The papacy versus the House of Hohenstaufen ===
The rising had its origin in the struggle of investiture between the pope and the Hohenstaufen Holy Roman Emperors for control of Italy, especially the Church's private demesne known as the Papal States. These lay between Hohenstaufen lands in northern Italy and the Hohenstaufen Kingdom of Sicily in the south; the Hohenstaufens also, at the time, ruled Germany.

In 1245 Pope Innocent IV excommunicated Frederick II and declared him deposed, and roused opposition against him in Germany and Italy. When Frederick died in 1250, his dominion was inherited by his son, Conrad IV of Germany. A period of turmoil followed Conrad's death in 1254, and the Kingdom of Sicily was seized by Manfred, King of Sicily, Frederick's illegitimate son, who reigned from 1258 to 1266.

Manfred had no involvement in German politics, where the interregnum lasted longer and there was no emperor until 1274. He first styled himself as vicar of his nephew Conradin, Conrad's son. However, following a false rumor that Conradin was dead, Manfred had himself crowned king. He wished for a reconciliation with the papacy, which may have explained his support for the landless Baldwin II, Latin Emperor. However, Pope Urban IV and later Pope Clement IV were not prepared to recognize Manfred as lawful ruler of Sicily and first excommunicated him, then sought to depose him by force of arms.

After abortive attempts to enlist England as the champion of the Papacy against Manfred, Urban IV settled on the later Charles I of Naples as his candidate for the Sicilian throne. Charles would invade Italy, and in 1266 defeated and killed Manfred at the Battle of Benevento, becoming King of Sicily. In 1268 Conradin, who had meanwhile come of age, invaded Italy to press his claim to the throne, but he was defeated at the Battle of Tagliacozzo and executed afterwards. Charles was now undisputed master of the Kingdom of Sicily.

=== Charles of Anjou and Sicilian unrest ===
Charles regarded his Sicilian territories as a springboard for his Mediterranean ambitions, which included the overthrow of Michael VIII Palaiologos of the Byzantine Empire and the capture of Constantinople. Constantinople was captured during the Fourth Crusade and had been brought into the fold of the Roman Catholic religion for 57 years under the rule of the Latin Empire. With the Byzantine recapture of the city in 1261, Michael VIII Palaiologos continued to rebuild what was left of the economically strategic city as an important trade route to Europe.

Unrest simmered in Sicily because of its very subordinate role in Charles' empire—its nobles had no share in the government of their own island and were not compensated by lucrative posts abroad, as were Charles' French, Provençal and Neapolitan subjects; also, Charles spent the heavy taxes he imposed on wars outside Sicily, making Sicily somewhat of a donor economy to Charles' nascent empire. As Steven Runciman put it, "[The Sicilians] saw themselves now being ruled to enable an alien tyrant make conquests from which they would have no benefit".

The unrest was also fomented by Byzantine agents to thwart Charles' projected invasion and by King Peter III of Aragon, Manfred's son-in-law, who saw his wife Constance as rightful heir to the Sicilian throne.

== The uprising ==
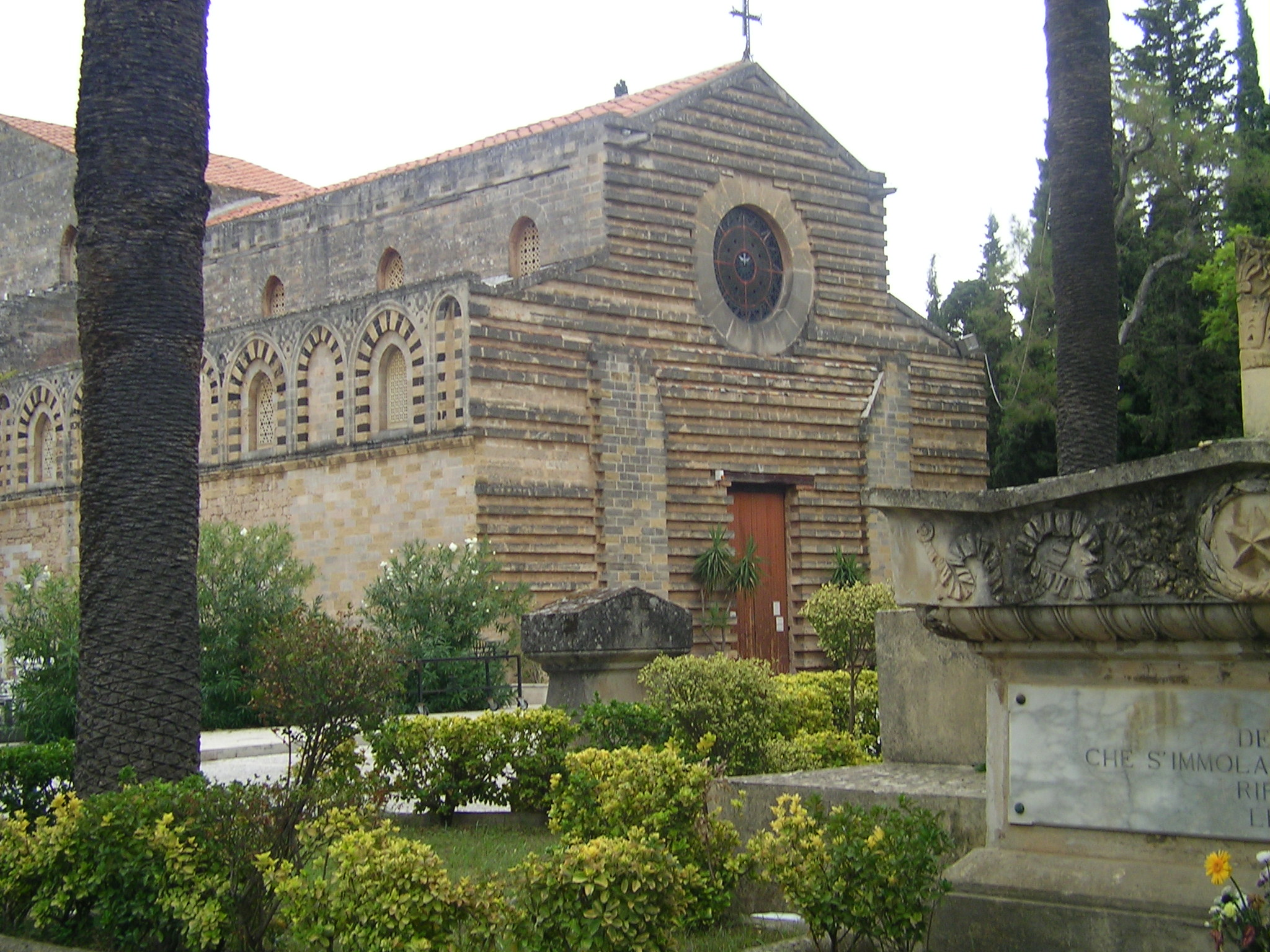
The church of the Holy Spirit in Palermo.

The event takes its name from an insurrection which began at the start of Vespers, the sunset prayer marking the beginning of the night vigil on Easter Monday, 30 March 1282, at the Church of the Holy Spirit just outside Palermo. Beginning on that night, thousands of Sicily's French inhabitants were massacred within six weeks. The events that started the uprising are not known for certain, but the various retellings have common elements.

According to English historian Steven Runciman (1958), the Sicilians at the church were engaged in holiday festivities and a group of French officials came by to join in and began to drink. A sergeant named Drouet dragged a young married woman from the crowd, pestering her with his advances. Her husband then attacked Drouet with a knife, killing him. When the other Frenchmen tried to avenge their comrade, the Sicilian crowd fell upon them, killing them all. At that moment all the church bells in Palermo began to ring for Vespers. Runciman describes the mood of the night:

To the sound of the bells messengers ran through the city calling on the men of Palermo to rise against the oppressor. At once the streets were filled with angry armed men, crying "Death to the French" ("moranu li Francisi" in Sicilian). Every Frenchman they met was struck down. They poured into the inns frequented by the French and the houses where they dwelt, sparing neither man, woman nor child. Sicilian girls who had married Frenchmen perished with their husbands. The rioters broke into the Dominican and Franciscan convents; and all the foreign friars were dragged out and told to pronounce the word "ciciri", whose sound the French tongue could never accurately reproduce. Anyone who failed the test was slain… By the next morning some two thousand French men and women lay dead; and the rebels were in complete control of the city.

According to Leonardo Bruni (1416), the Palermitans were holding a festival outside the city when the French came up to check for weapons, and on that pretext began to fondle the breasts of their women. This then began a riot. The French were attacked, first with rocks, then weapons, and all were killed. The news spread to other cities leading to revolt throughout Sicily. "By the time the furious anger at their insolence had drunk its fill of blood, the French had given up to the Sicilians not only their ill-gotten riches but their lives as well."

There is also a third version of the events that is quite close to Runciman's, varying only in the minor details. This story is part of the oral tradition on the island up to the present time. This oral tradition cannot be verified, but is of interest to sociologists. According to the legend, John of Procida was the mastermind behind the conspiracy, though modern sources consider Procida's role in instigating the revolt to be either an exaggeration or outright historical inaccuracy. It seems that he was in contact with both Michael VIII Palaiologos and Peter III of Aragon. All three were later excommunicated by Pope Martin IV in 1282.

== Immediate aftermath ==
After leaders were elected in Palermo, messengers spread word across the island for the rebels to strike before the French had time to organise resistance. In a fortnight the rebels gained control over most of the island, and within six weeks it was all under rebel control, except for Messina which was well fortified, and whose leading family, the Riso, remained faithful to Charles. But on 28 April it too broke into open revolt under the command of Captain of the People Alaimo da Lentini and, most significantly, the islanders' first act was to set fire to Charles's fleet in the harbor. It is reported that upon hearing of the fleet's destruction, King Charles exclaimed "Lord God, since it has pleased You to ruin my fortune, let me only go down in small steps."

Charles' Vicar Herbert and his family were safely within castle Mategriffon, but after negotiations the rebels granted Herbert and his family safe conduct to leave the island upon a promise that they never return. After the restoration of order in the city, the townsmen announced themselves a free commune answerable only to the pope. They elected leaders, one of whom was Bartholomaeus of Neocastro who was prominent in the unfolding events and would later chronicle much of the revolt in Historia Sicula, an important if sometimes contradictory source of information for historians. Again significantly, the leaders' next act was to send word, via a Genoese merchant named Alafranco Cassano, to the Emperor Michael advising him that his nemesis Charles had been crippled. Only thereafter were ambassadors sent to Pope Martin IV pleading for each city on the island to be recognised as a free commune under the sole suzerainty of the Holy Church. The islanders were hoping for status similar to that enjoyed by Venice, Genoa, Pisa and other cities, which were free to form their own government but morally answerable only to the Pope, who would hold a vague and unstable suzerainty. However, the French pope was firmly in Charles' camp and he directed the Sicilians to recognize Charles as their rightful king. But Martin underestimated the Sicilians' hatred of the French, and especially of Charles, who ruled from Naples rather than Palermo, where he could have seen the suffering caused by his officials. Charles' island officials were far removed from his oversight; he did not see the avarice, the rape, theft and murder, nor did he see the high taxes levied against the meager possessions of the peasants, which kept them impoverished, but made no improvement in their lives.

== Aragonese intervention ==
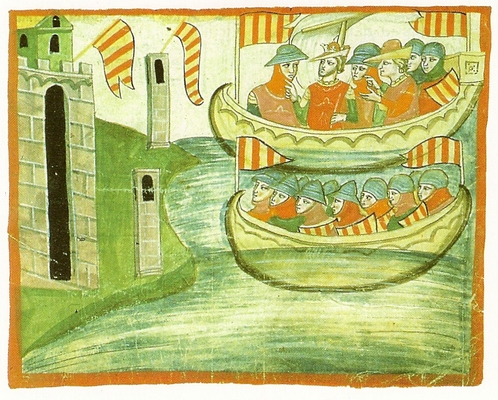
Arrival of Peter the Great (III of Aragon, II of Aragon and Catalonia) in Sicily (1282). We can see him accompanied by his wife and her royal maids, to claim her legal rights to the throne. "Arrivo Aragonesi" (Biblioteca Vaticana)

The pope refused the rebels' pleas to allow the status of free communes; therefore, the Sicilians sent their pleas to Peter III of Aragon married to Constance, daughter of Manfred, King of Sicily and granddaughter of the Hohenstaufen Holy Roman Emperor, Frederick II. Of all that emperor's heirs, she was the only one not captive and was able to assert her rights. Peter III championed his wife's claim to the entirety of the Kingdom of Sicily.

Before the Vespers, Peter III constructed and outfitted a fleet for war. When the pope asked why he needed such a great war fleet, Peter stated that it would be used against the Saracens along the northern coast of Africa, because he had legitimate trade interests there and needed to protect them. So when Peter received a request for help from the Sicilians he was conveniently on the north coast of Africa in Tunis, just 200 miles across the sea from the island. At first, Peter feigned indifference to the request of the Sicilians and their plight, but after several days to allow a proper showing of deference made for the pope's consumption, he took advantage of the revolt. Peter ordered his fleet to sail for Sicily, landed at Trapani on 30 August 1282. While he marched towards Palermo, his fleet followed close by the coastal road. Peter III of Aragon's involvement changed the character of the uprising from a local revolt into a European war. When Peter arrived at Palermo on September 2, he was received initially by the populace with indifference, as merely one foreign king replacing another. However, when Pope Martin made plain his orders for the Sicilians to accept Charles, Peter promised the islanders that they would enjoy the ancient privileges they had had under the Norman king, William II of Sicily. Thus, he was accepted as a satisfactory second choice and crowned by acclamation at the cathedral in Palermo on September 4, thus becoming also Peter I of Sicily.

With the pope's blessing, the counterattack from Charles was not long in coming; his fleet from the Kingdom of Naples arrived and blockaded the port of Messina and made several attempts to land troops on the island, but all were repulsed.

== The commentary of Michael Palaeologos ==
Years later, in his autobiography, the Byzantine emperor Michael VIII wrote: "Should I dare to claim that I was God's instrument to bring freedom to the Sicilians, then I should only be stating the truth." But as Runciman observes, with or without Byzantine gold, it was the people of Sicily alone who fought against their armed oppressor; and "However it may have been plotted and prepared, it was that one March evening of the Vespers at Palermo that brought down King Charles' empire."

== Sources ==
- Runciman, Steven, The Sicilian Vespers, Cambridge: Cambridge University Press, 1958, ISBN 0-521-43774-1.
- Lu rebellamentu di Sichilia, lu quale Hordinau e Fichi pari Misser Iohanni in Procita contra Re Carlu is still located in the Central Library in Palermo. Whether it is a contemporary narrative or not hinges on the interpretation of one word in the text. Runciman (p. 329) describes these words as putirini, the first person plural, vs putirisi the impersonal tense.
- The earliest narrative source for the Vespers is the Sicilian language Lu rebellamentu di Sichilia, written perhaps as early as 1287. It credits John of Procida with organising the overthrow of the French and portrays him in a positive light. Two later Tuscan Guelph histories, the Liber Jani de Procida et Palialoco and the Leggenda di Messer Gianni di Procida, possibly relying on the Rebellamentu or the Rebellamentu's lost source, follow it in stressing John's involvement, but they portray him in a more critical light. The Liber, as its title suggests, emphasises John's negotiations with Michael VIII ("Palioloco").
- Besides these there are two Florentine chronicles of importance. The Leggenda was once thought to be a source for the Nuova Cronica of Giovanni Villani, itself a source for the Vespers. Brunetto Latini, in his Tesoro, similarly adopts the Sicilian version of events, which includes the earliest version of the rape. The Tuscan Liber turns the rape story around, suggesting the Sicilian woman had pulled a knife on her French suitor when his friends came to aid him.
- The Catholic Encyclopedia. A description of all prayer 'Offices' is given therein: Vespers, Matins, Laudes, etc.
- Jordan, L'Allemagne et l'Italie, at pp. 219–221. This is the best source of the blasphemous and cunning character of Frederick II as king.
- Bäthgen, Die Regentschaft Papst Innocenz III im Konigreich Sizilien describes Frederick's minority. See also Van Cleve, Markward of Anweiler; and Luchaire, Innocent III, vol. III; and Rome et l'Italie, pp. 153–204. Jordan (supra) at pp. 272–74 discusses the origin of the Guelf and Ghibelline factions. See also Hefele-Leclercq, Historie des Conciles vol VI, I, pp. 6–9.
- Chalandon, Historie de la Domination Normande en Italia, vol. I, pp. 189–211, 327–354. These are excellent sources describing the Norman Conquest of Italy and Sicily by the Guiscard family. For their rule in Sicily, see vol. II, passim.

== References in culture ==
- Author Carlo Treviso's historical thriller novel, Siciliana (2022), depicts the harrowing events surrounding the Sicilian Vespers Revolt of 1282.
- The Sicilian Vespers has been a commonly represented topic by Italian painters, for example, Francesco Hayez painted three works on the Sicilian Vespers, the first in 1821. Other painters include Morelli, Erulo Eroli, and Michele Rapisardi.
- Felicia Hemans's tragedy, The Vespers of Palermo (1823), in which the hero, Raimond di Procida (son of the Count di Procida), supports the insurrection but refuses to take part in the murder of innocent French citizens, is based loosely on this uprising.
- The German composer Peter Josef von Lindpaintner composed the opera Die Sizilianische Vesper, premiered in 1843 in Stuttgart and recorded in 2015 in its Italian version, Il vespro siciliano.
- The present (but composed in 1847 and set to music in 1848) Italian National anthem, "Il Canto degli Italiani", popularly known as "Fratelli d'Italia" ("Brothers of Italy"): "Il suon d'ogni squilla / i vespri sonò" (with reference to the past uprisings of the Italian people against foreign rulers, occurring again in these years).
- Reflecting the dual significance of the events to both France and Italy, Giuseppe Verdi's Les vêpres siciliennes (1855) was originally written for the Paris Opera to a libretto by Eugène Scribe but circulated more widely in its Italian version, I vespri siciliani.
- A popular urban legend holds that the Mafia began with the Sicilian Vespers and the word Mafia itself is a backronym for "Morte Alla Francia Italia Anelia!" ("Death to the French is Italy's Cry!"). However, this is very unlikely as Sicilians did not consider themselves to be Italians in the 13th century. The first reference to the term Mafia dates from 1862. The claim that the Mafia originated as a secret society that had allegedly organised and led the uprising of 1282 was propagated by Mafiosi in the 19th and 20th centuries to promote the Mafia's self-image as the romantic and chivalrous defenders of ordinary Sicilians against foreign oppressors. This origins story came to be believed by Mafiosi themselves with for example the American Mafiosi Joseph Bonanno telling his friends and family when asked about the origin of the Mafia that it began with the Sicilian Vespers. The fact that many Sicilians considered the Piedmont-dominated Italian state that emerged after Italian unification in 1861 to be a sort of foreign occupation gave the Mafia a strong reason to promote this image to capitalise on the widespread resentment felt by people in the Mezzogiorno about the way that the Piedmontese monopolised power in the new state. Hence the story about Mafia as the leaders of the Sicilian Vespers was invented, with the implication that the Italian state was the latest in a series of foreign oppressors and it would be ignoble for Sicilians to co-operate with the Italian state against the Mafia.

== 19th-century Italian paintings depicting Sicilian Vespers ==
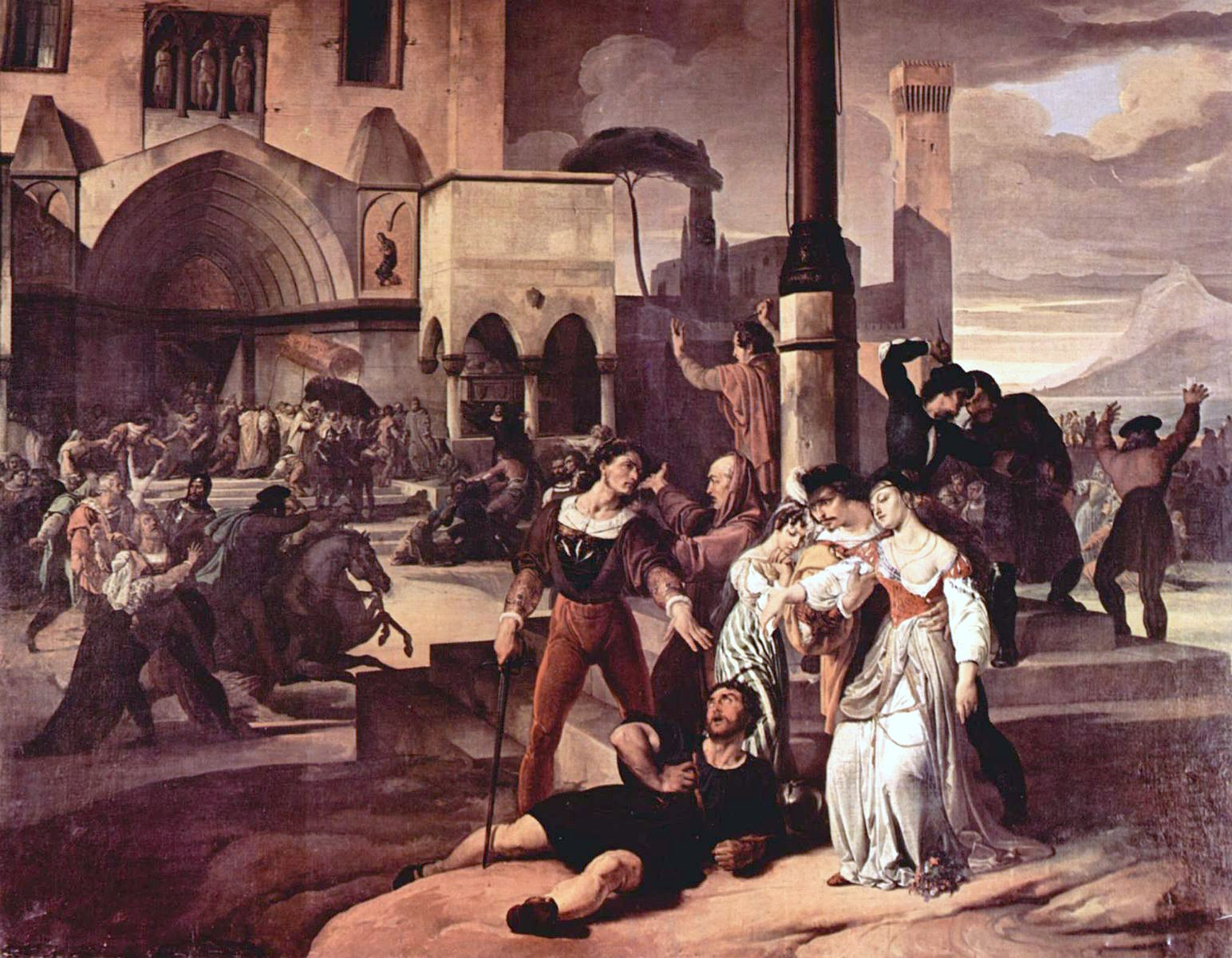
1821-1823 by Francesco Hayez

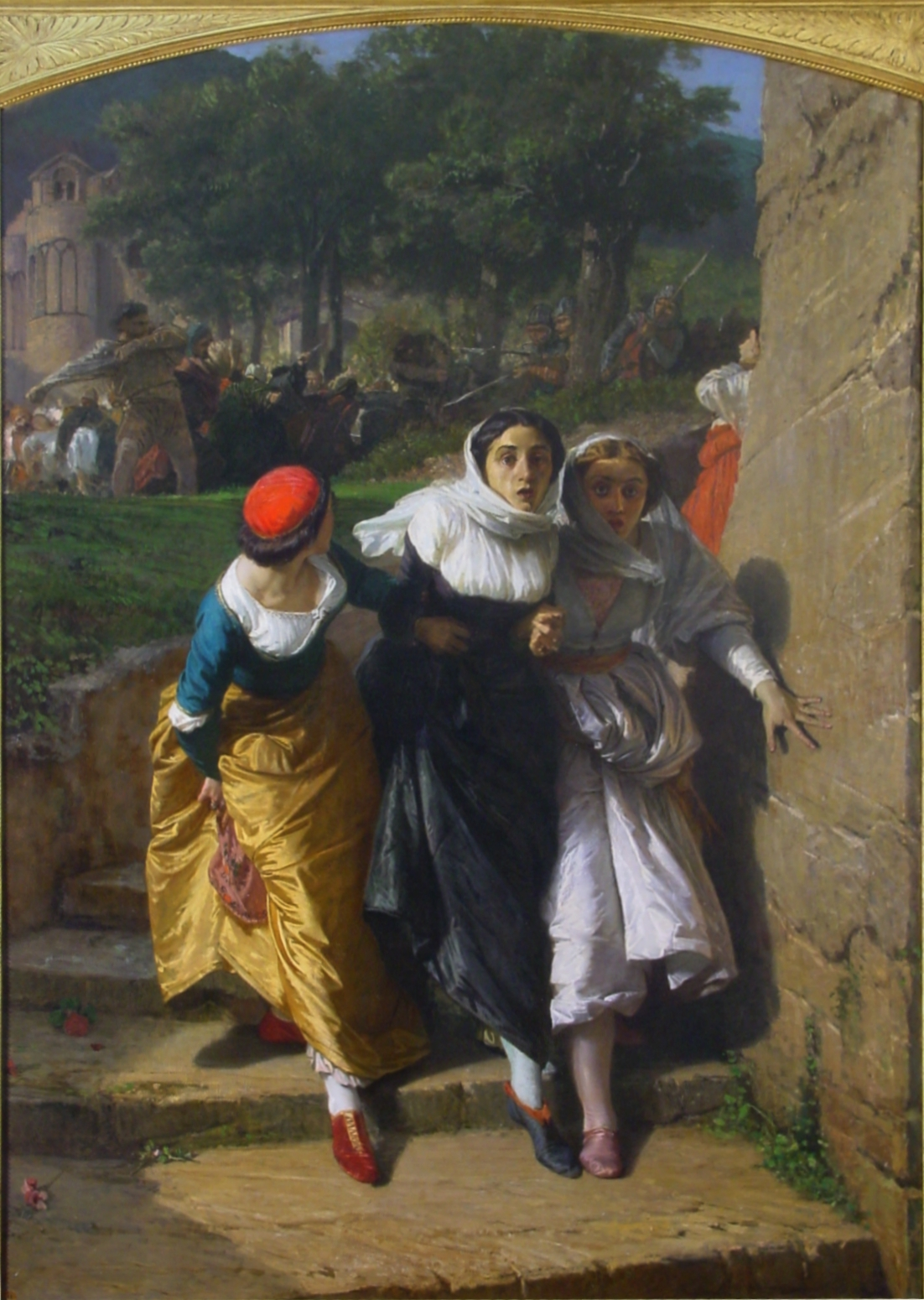
1859-1860 by Domenico Morelli

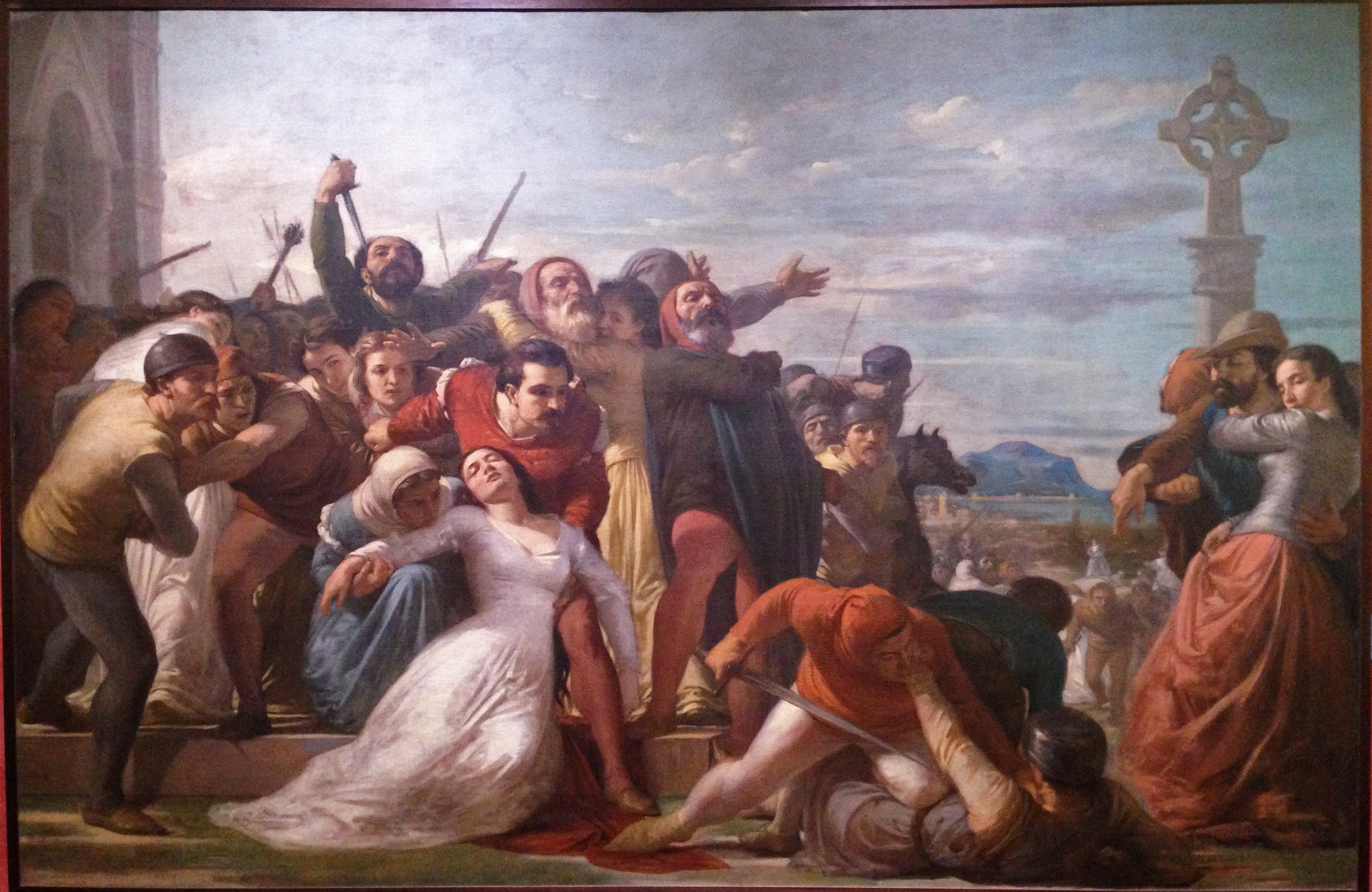
1865 by Michele Rapisardi

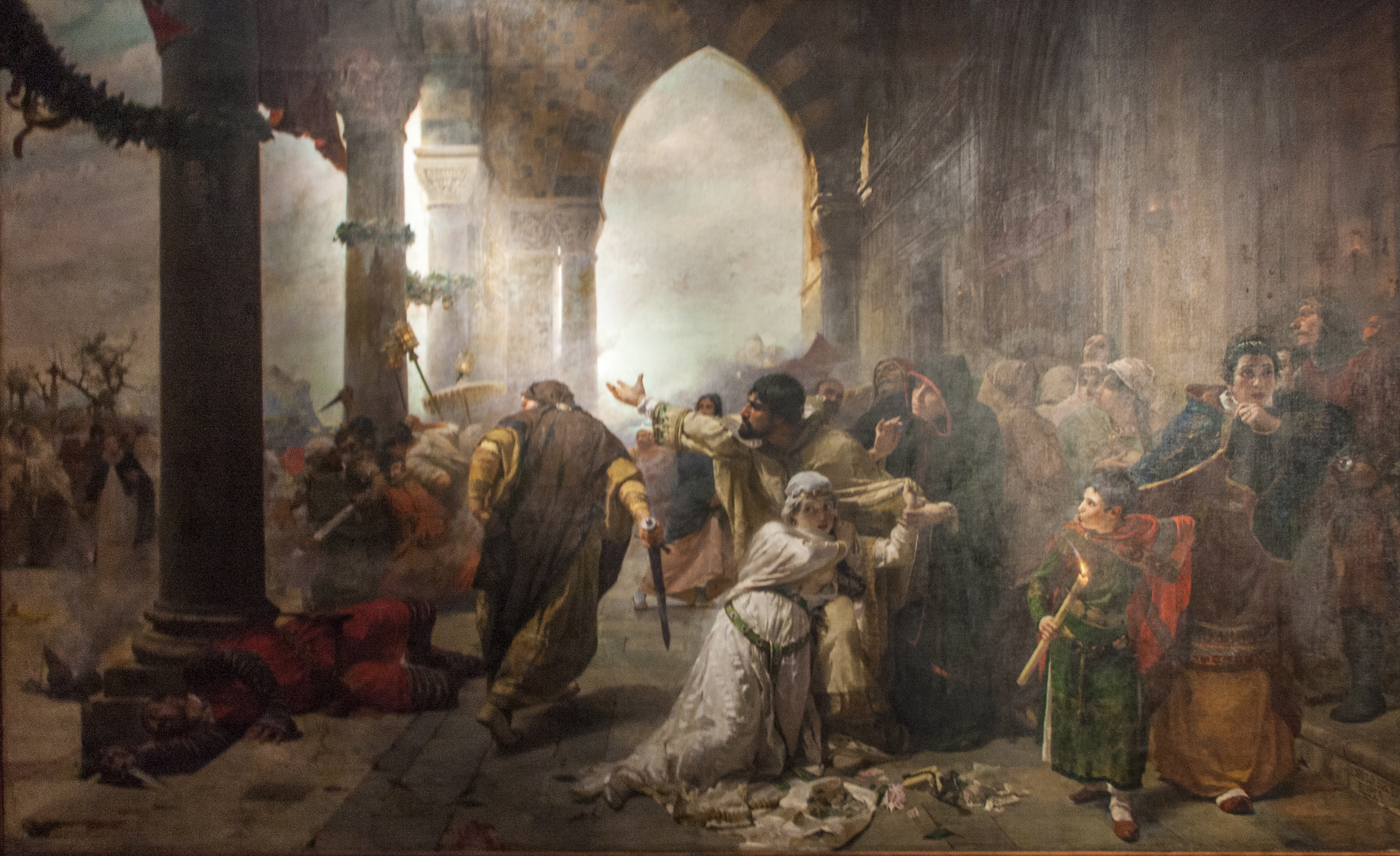
1890-1891 by Erulo Eroli

== Other uses of the term ==
- In 1594, when the French King Henry IV was taking some tedious peace negotiations with the Spanish ambassador in France, bored with the unwillingness of the Spaniards to accept his terms, he stated that the King of Spain should behave with more humility, for if not, he could easily invade Spanish territories in Italy, stating that "My armies could move so fast that I would have breakfast in Milan and dine in Rome." Whereupon the Spanish ambassador replied "Now then, if that is so, Your Majesty would surely make it to Sicily in time for Vespers".
- Having previously arranged the murder of mafia boss Joe Masseria on 15 April 1931 in order to consolidate organized crime in New York City under Salvatore Maranzano, mafia boss Lucky Luciano then ordered the murders of Maranzano and those capos of Maranzano and Masseria whom Luciano saw as threats. These murders allegedly occurred on September 10, 1931, which marked the end of the Castellammarese War in New York City and in Mafia parlance is known as the Night of the Sicilian Vespers. This was later proved to be mostly a myth in mafia culture as no hard evidence exists that all these murders – outside of Maranzano and a few others – actually occurred.
- Sicilian-born brothers David and Francis Rifugiato named their short-lived band "The Sicilian Vespers" after this event. They released one album on Profile Records in 1988.
- Operation Sicilian Vespers (1992–98), an internal security operation involving the collaborative forces of the Italian Armed Forces and local police in the fight against the Sicilian mafia.
