= Yerevan 2800th Anniversary Park =

Park in the center of Yerevan

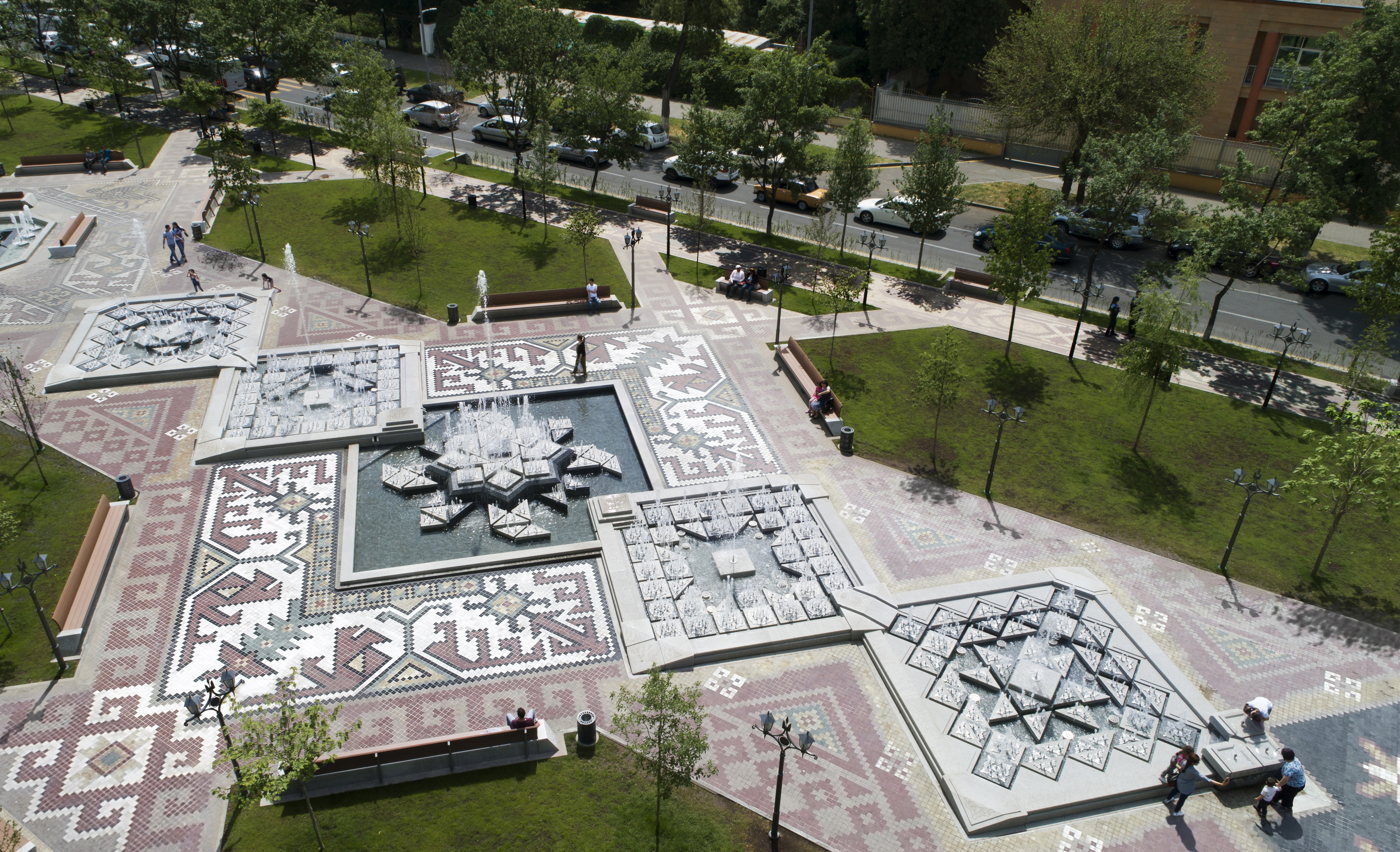
- Yerevan 2800th Anniversary Park
- Interactive map of Yerevan 2800th Anniversary Park
- Type: Public
- Location: Kentron District, Yerevan, Armenia
- Coordinates: 40°10′31″N 44°30′26″E
- Area: 1.5 hectares (3.7 acres)
- Created: May 10, 2019
- Owner: Yerevan Municipality
- Operator: "Vardanyan Family" Charity Foundation
- Status: Open all year round

Yerevan 2800th Anniversary Park (public park in Kentron administrative district of Yerevan), also known as the Vardanyans' park, was opened on 10 May 2019. The park is a gift from philanthropists Mikayel and Karen Vardanyan on the 2800th anniversary of the foundation of Yerevan city.

The park is surrounded by the streets of Italy, Beirut, Khorenatsi and Saint Grigor Lusavorich. The park stretches between the statues of Stepan Shaumian and Alexander Miasnikian.

== History ==
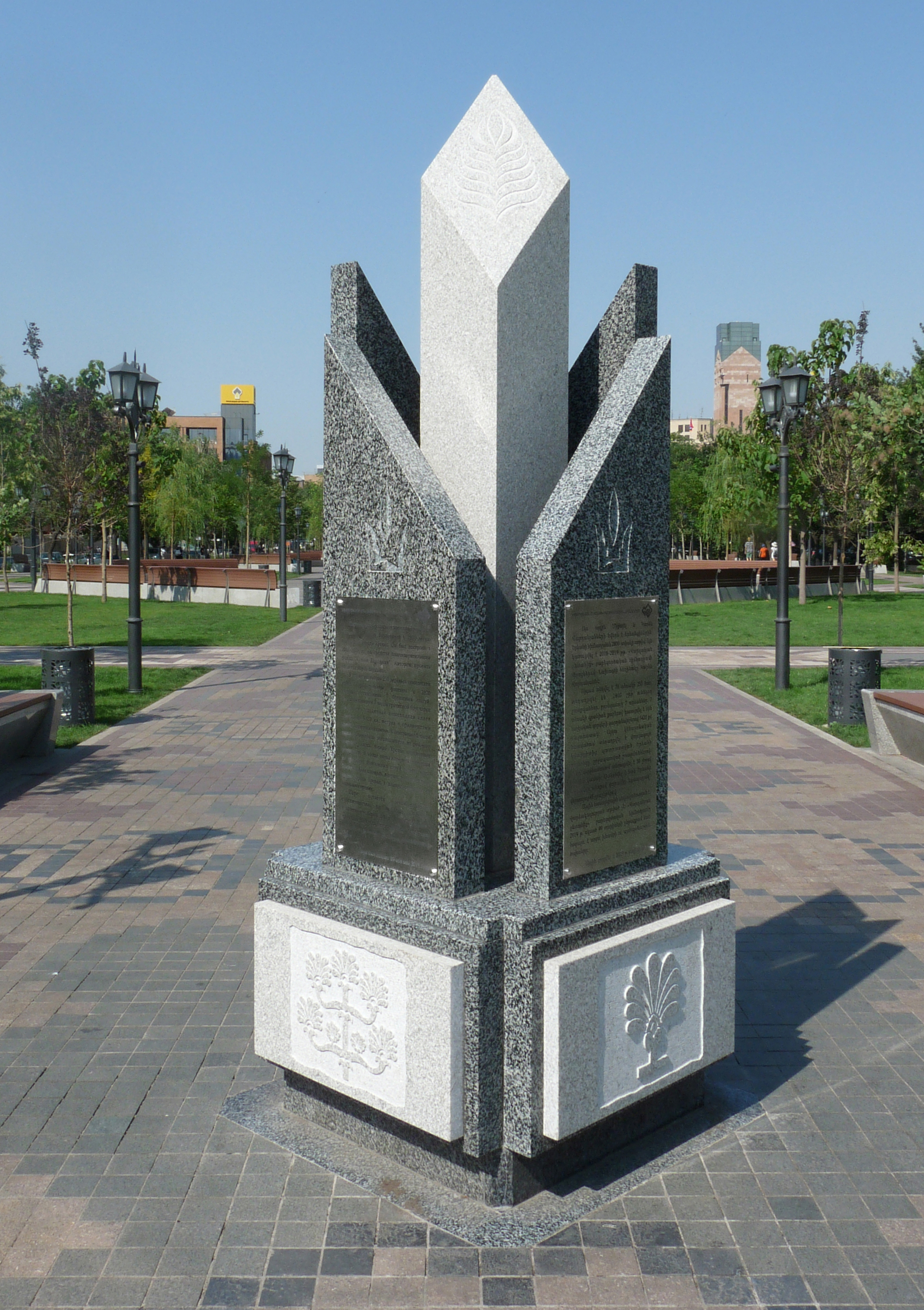
“Vardanyan Family” Charity Foundation's obelisk

Previously this area was a marginal part of the English Park. After the construction of the Italy Street in 2002, this site seemed to have turned into an island. Due to the lack of maintenance of the area and its poor condition, it ceased to serve as a public park area. At that time the trees of the park were sick, old and rotten, the benches were damaged, the fountains were destroyed and non-functioning. It was in this area that the construction of Yerevan 2800th Anniversary Park started in the beginning of 2018 and was finished in 2019. It took half a year to create the project and another year and a half to complete the construction of the park. According to the new architectural project, during the construction everything in the park has been changed including soil replacement of the park territory.

The grand opening ceremony of the park took place on May 10, 2019. The park was completely built with the financial support and efforts provided by the “Vardanyan Family” Charity Foundation. The author of the project is Karen Vardanyan. The amount of 5 million 300 thousand US dollars has been spent on the implementation of this project.

Besides the construction of the park, from the 2019 on the “Vardanyan Family” Charity Foundation will also cover the expenses of care and maintenance of the park for a period of the next 99 years.

== Green area ==
The green area of the park is 7,500 sq.m. There are 369 trees of 70 species in the park. Taking into consideration the climate conditions of Armenia, 250 unique and exotic trees were carefully selected and imported for planting in the park. The park is both-side surrounded by a fence of bushes. Green areas are irrigated by an automated drip and sprinkler autonomous system. Irrigation is carried out only at night in order not to disturb visitors.

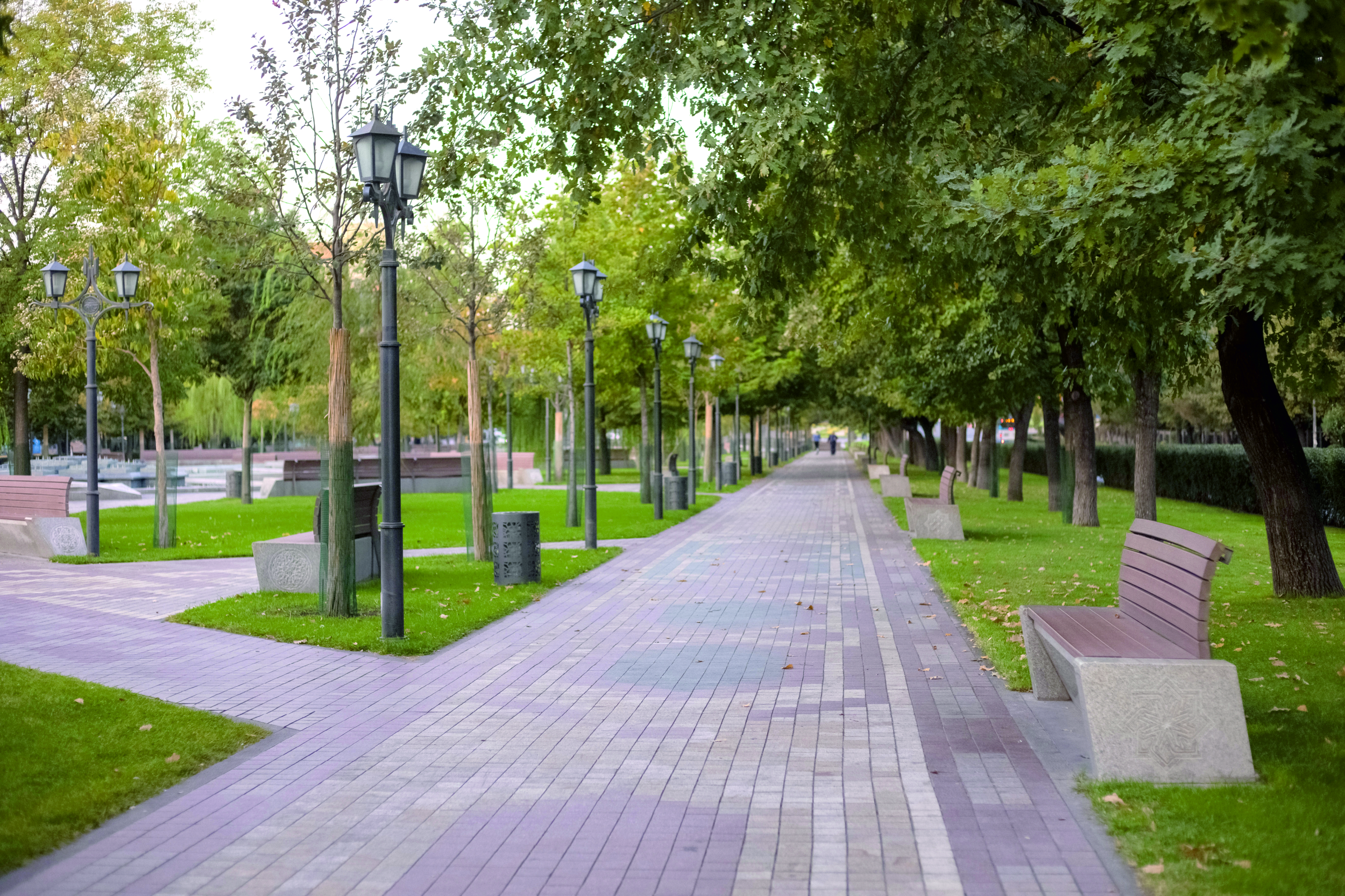

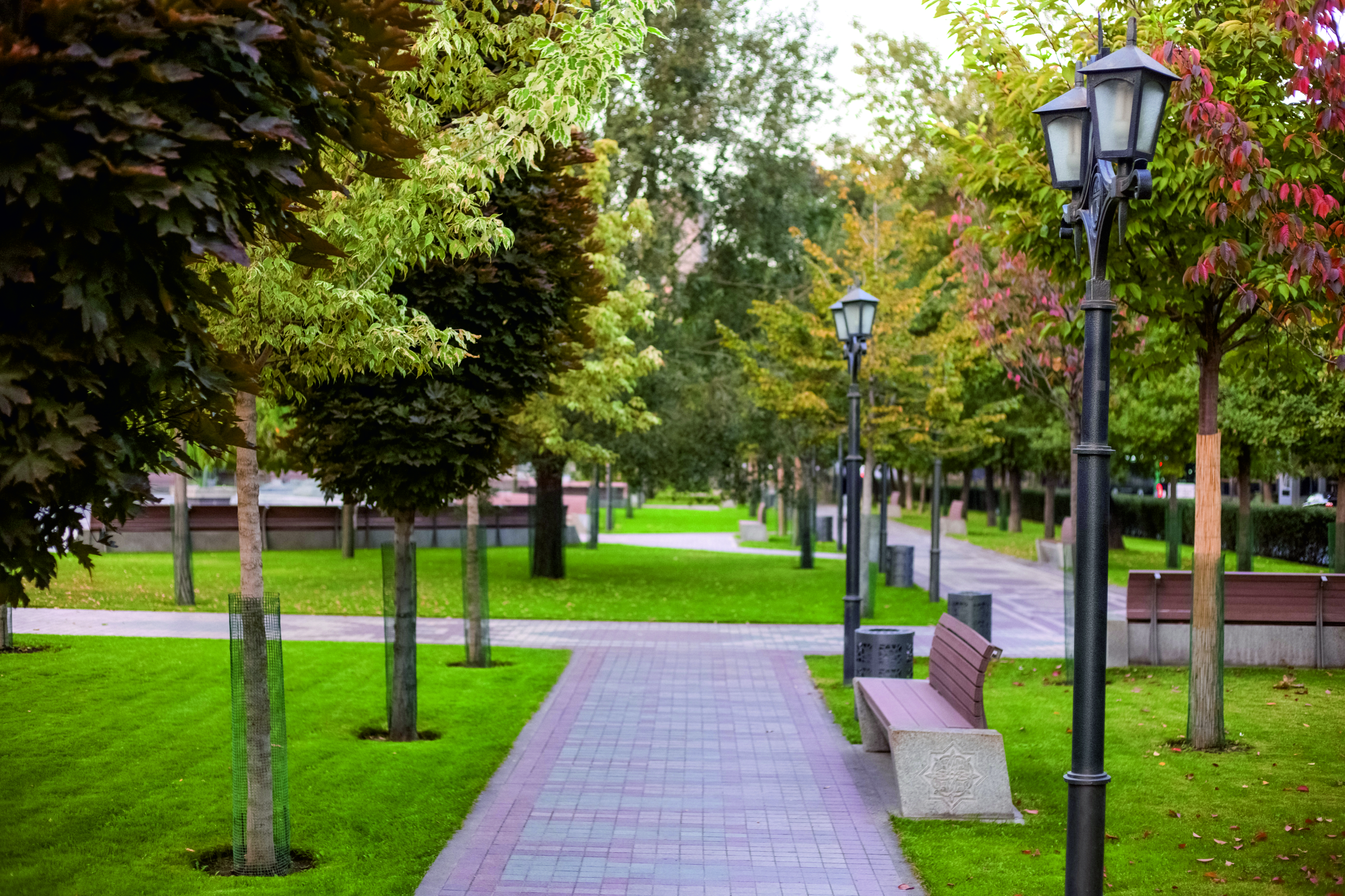
Green area of the park

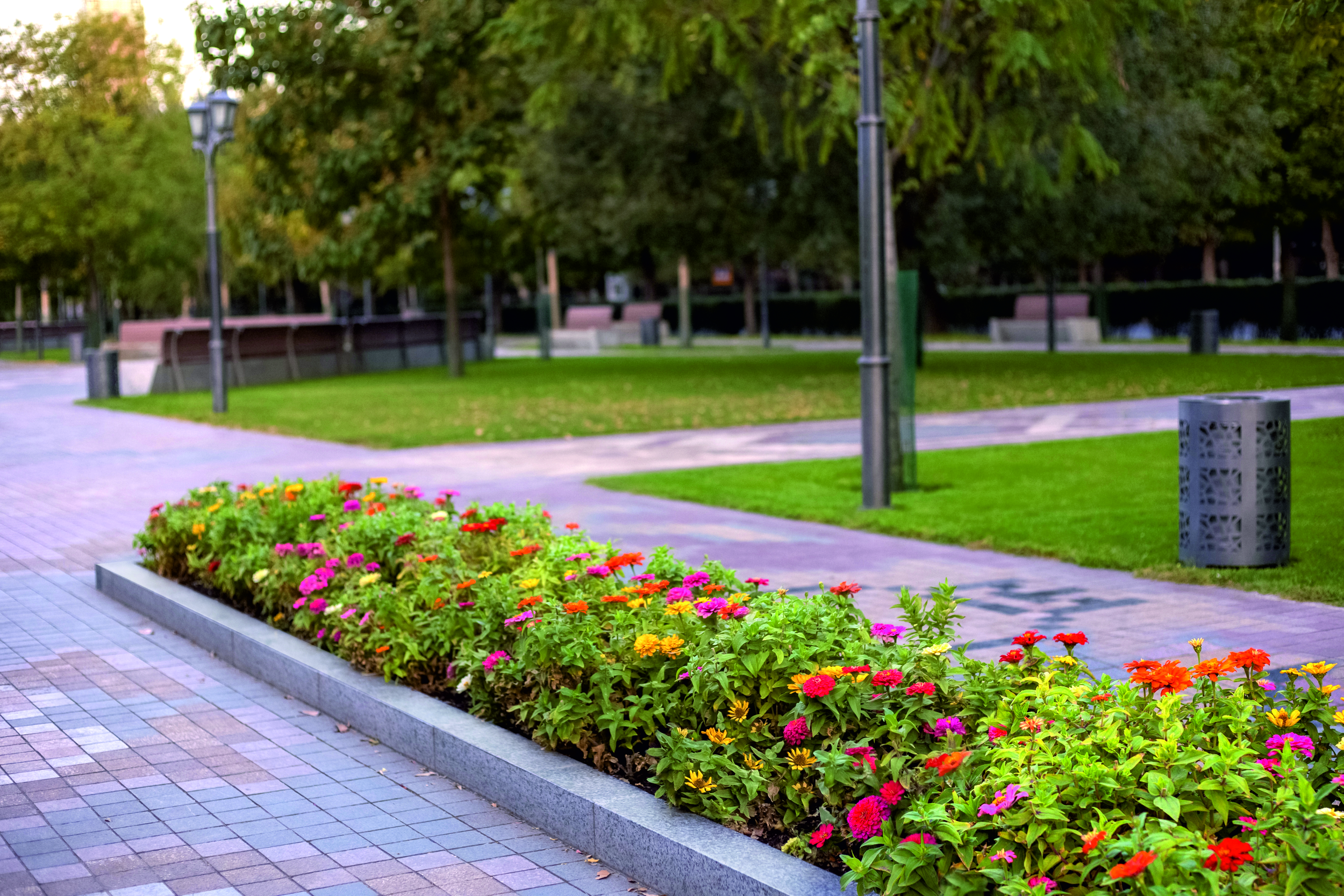

== Fountains ==
Every year the park fountains are turned on in May and turned off in October depending on weather condition. All the fountains run daily from 11:00AM to midnight, and in May and October to 09:00PM. The fountains’ lighting is automatically turned on in the evening at dusk and is turned off at midnight.

In the park there are 8 types of fountains with multicolored lighting and granite basins: pedestrian, with ascending waters, rotating, sparkling and arched, dancing, waving and dynamically swaying. The basins of all the fountains in the park are made of 2 color granite tiles. Granite tiles are engraved with Armenian traditional ornaments.

The main fountain complex consists of 10 pools-5 on each side, and 2,800 water jet fountains decorated with Armenian ornaments made of aluminum. There are drinking fountains on both ends of the complex. The design of granite and aluminum patterns for each of the 10 basins is unique and unrepeatable.

In the central part of the fountain complex basin there is a map of pink quartzite with engraved names of 12 administrative districts of Yerevan. The map is surrounded by 12 dynamic, bubbling fountains and 4 spiral water jets.

A water arch with 30 water jets was installed in the park. According to the visitors’ beliefs, walking through the arched fountain has a healing effect.

A square made of black granite and engraved in the form of the smaller scale map of Yerevan city, with its 45 rising water jets was also constructed in the park. It is equipped with four sensors that enable changing the dynamics of the fountain by touching. In the evening, the area is surrounded by illuminated colorful fog, periodically emerging from the surface of the ground. Hrazdan river with its 4 bridges is also symbolized on the map in blue granite.

In 2025, with the financing of 330 million drams from Mikael and Karen Vardanyan, the fountains in the area on the map of Yerevan were transformed into the musical ones, with a new light and music-filled rich performance, accompanied by well-known Armenian compositions. The program takes place during the summer months from 9:30 PM to 9:50 PM. 59 water jets of 7 types are used for the performance, with the highest jet reaching a 15 meters. Around the perimeter of the engraved square, eight design-crafted columns support are equipped with powerful acoustic systems.

To ensure the beautiful appearance of the fountains of Yerevan 2800th Anniversary Park and to provide comfort for visitors, an underground powerful facility with its pools, modern systems of pipes and pumps has been built.

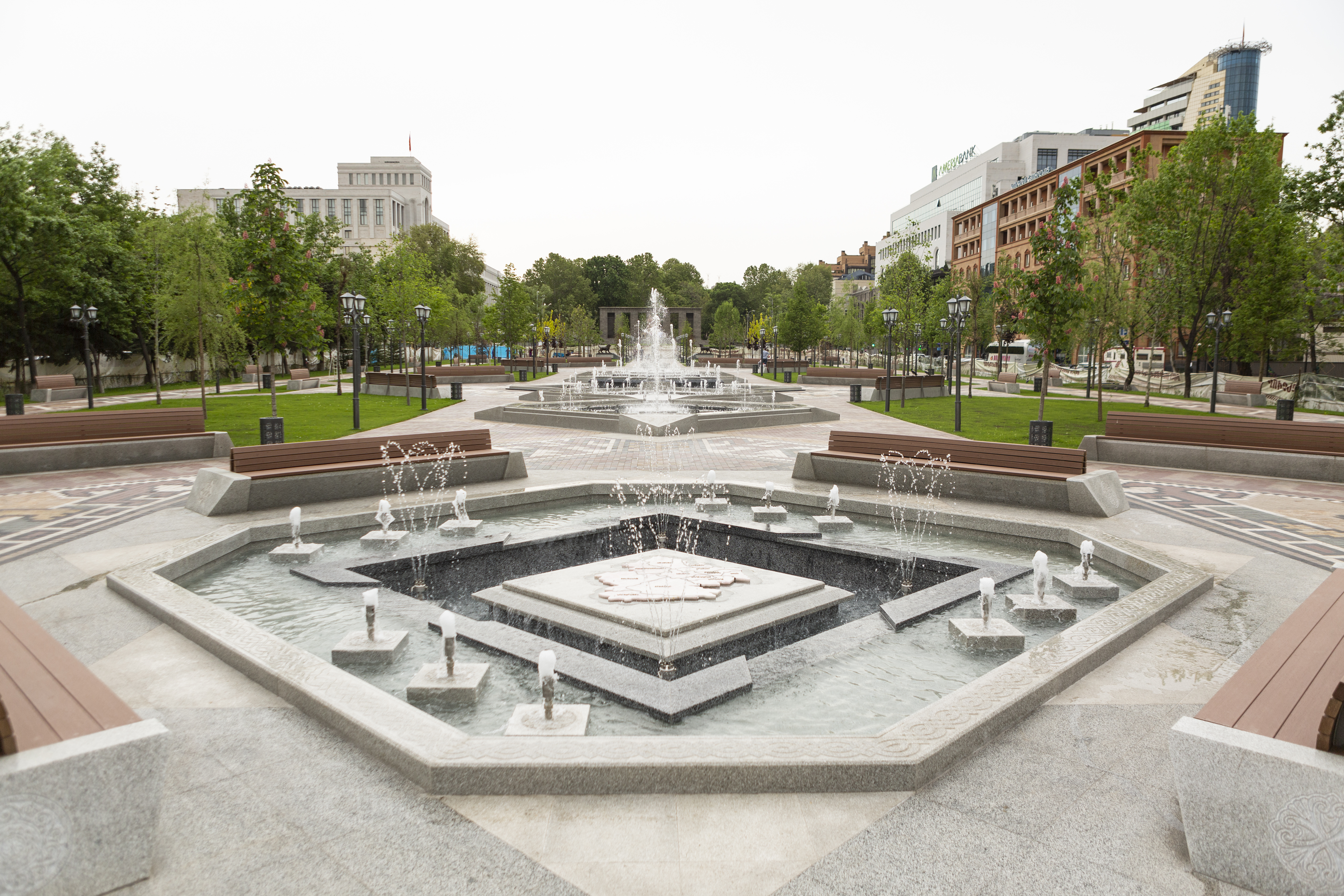
Quartzite map engraved with the 12 administrative districts of Yerevan

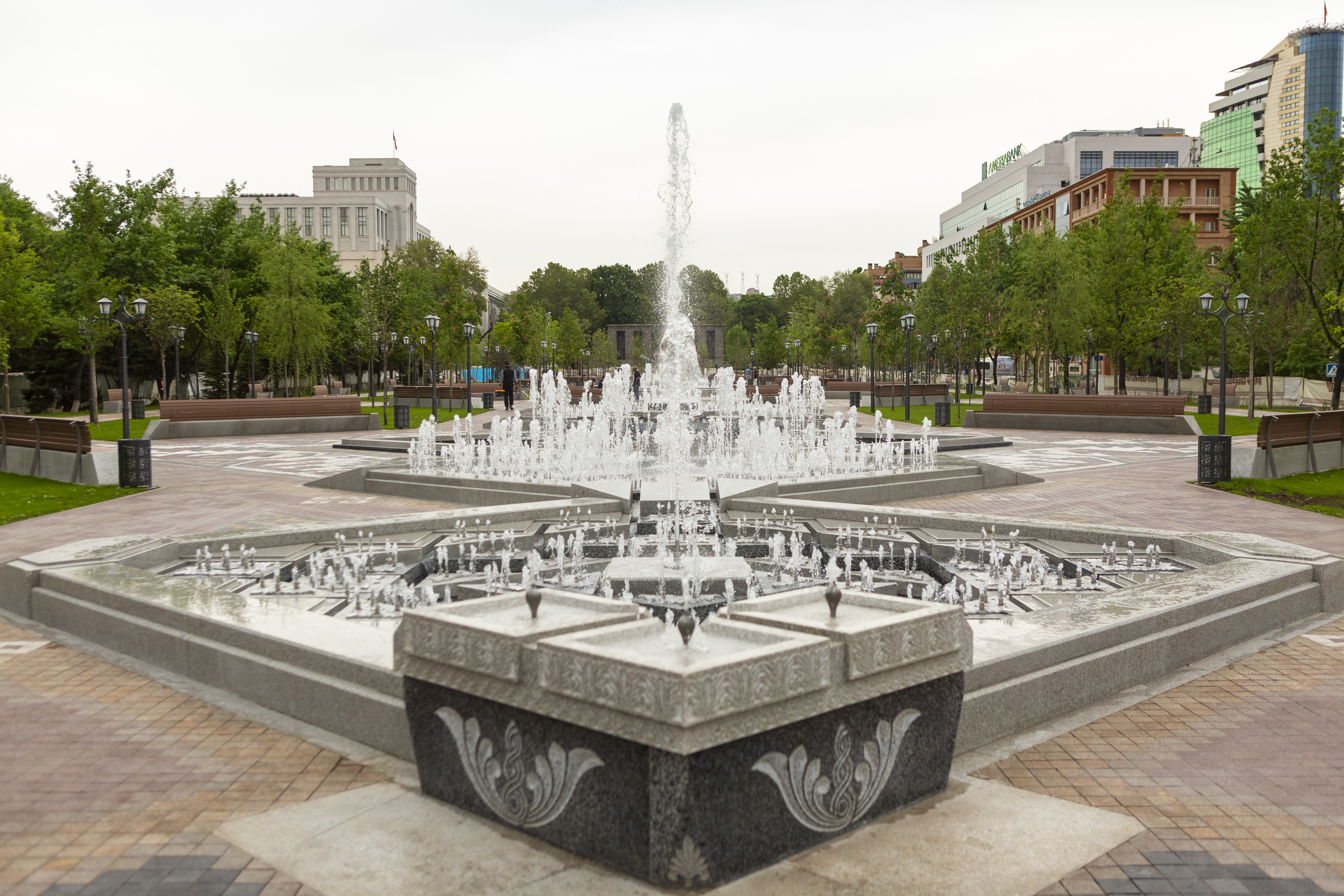
Fountains with granite basins

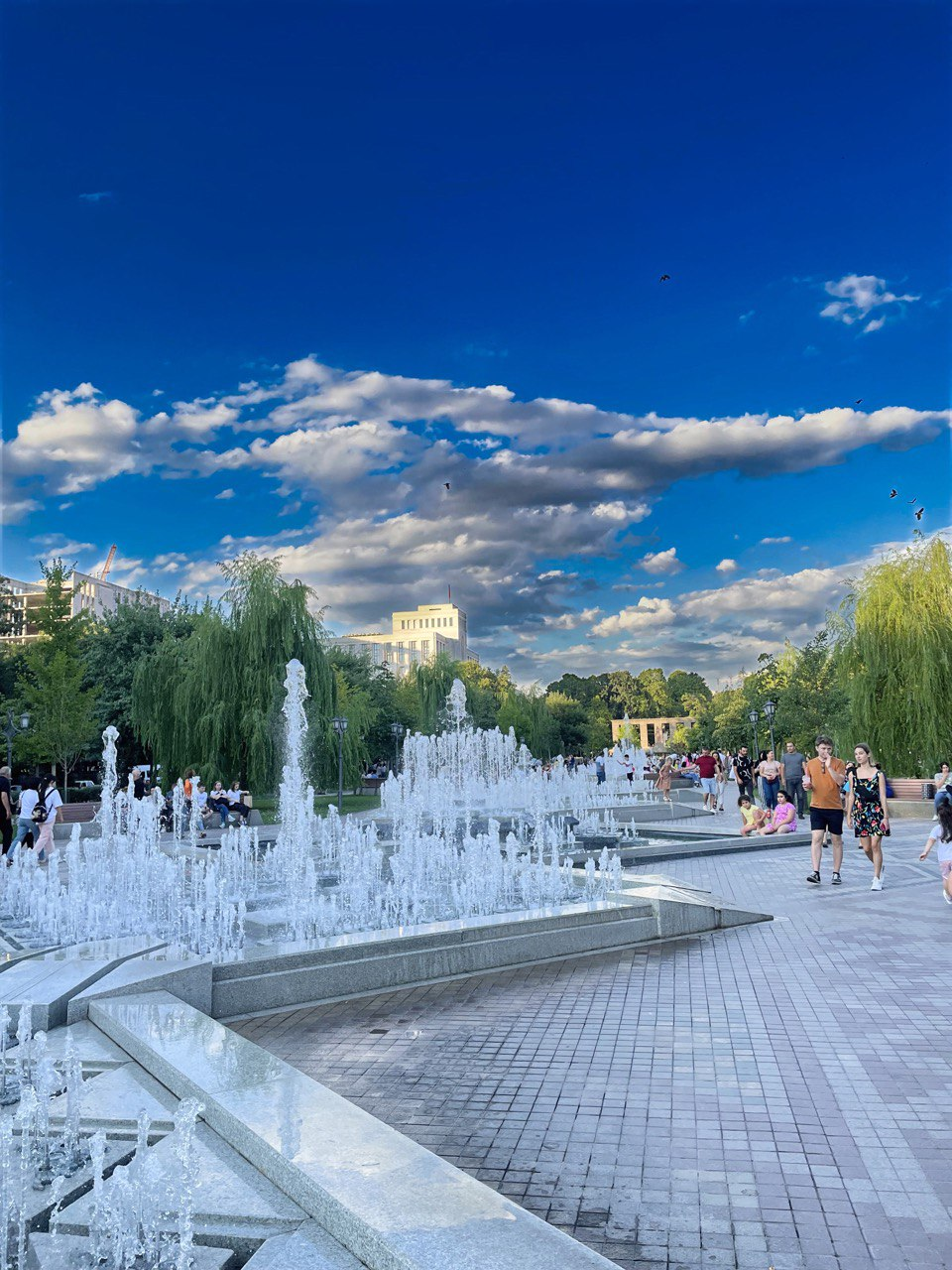
Fountains with granite basins

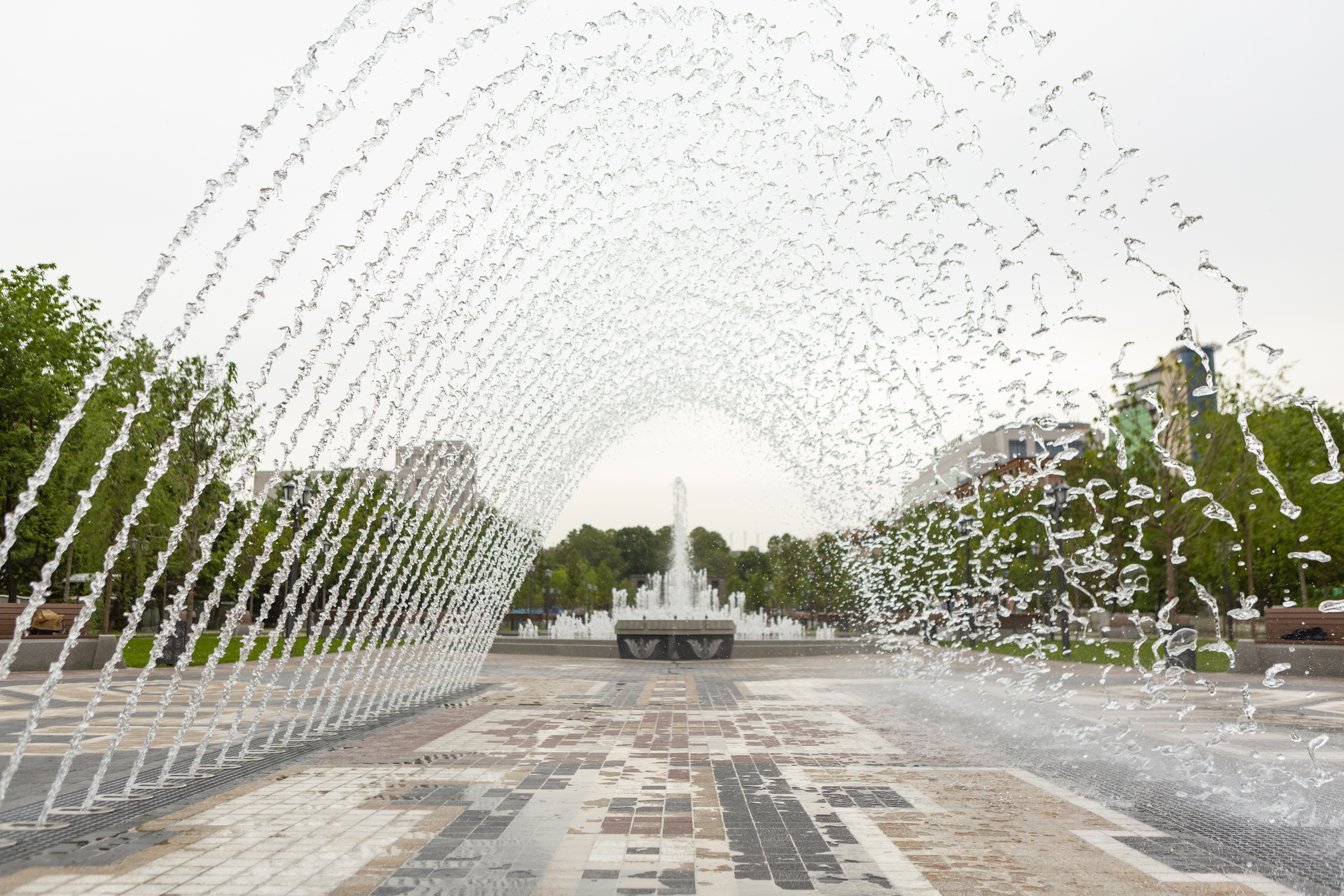
Water arch with 30 jets

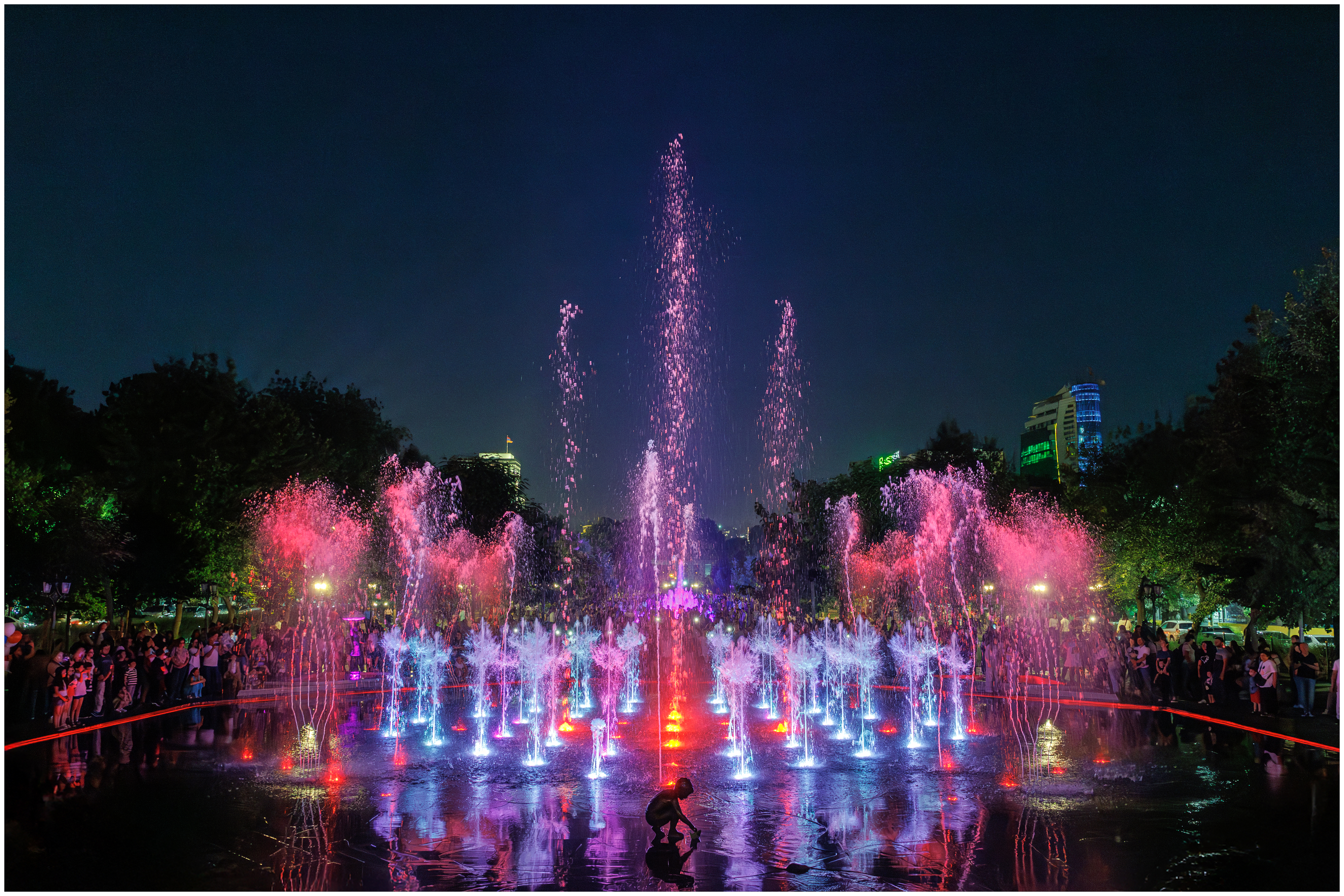
Engraved square in the shape of Yerevan's map, featuring upward water jets

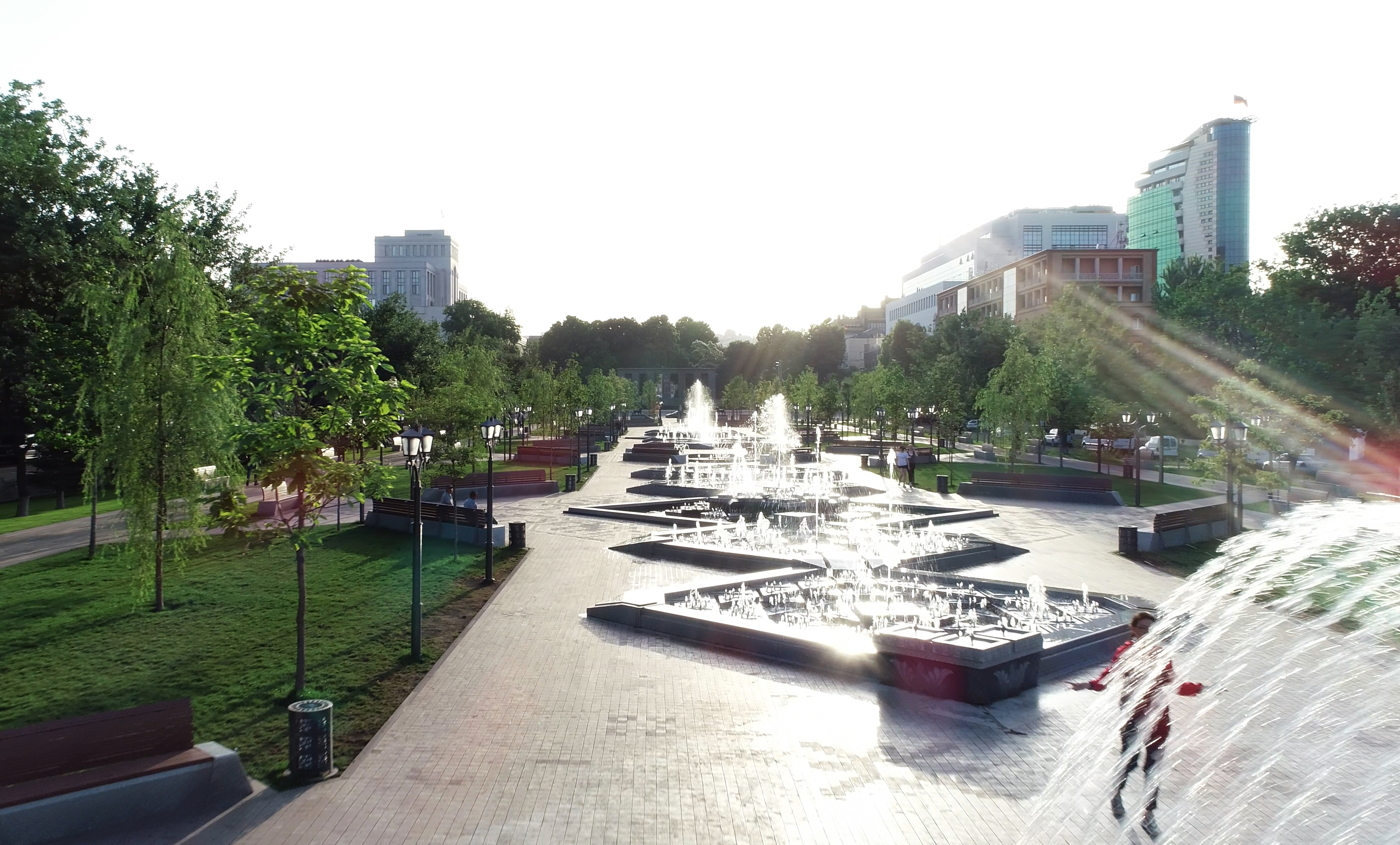
General view of the fountains

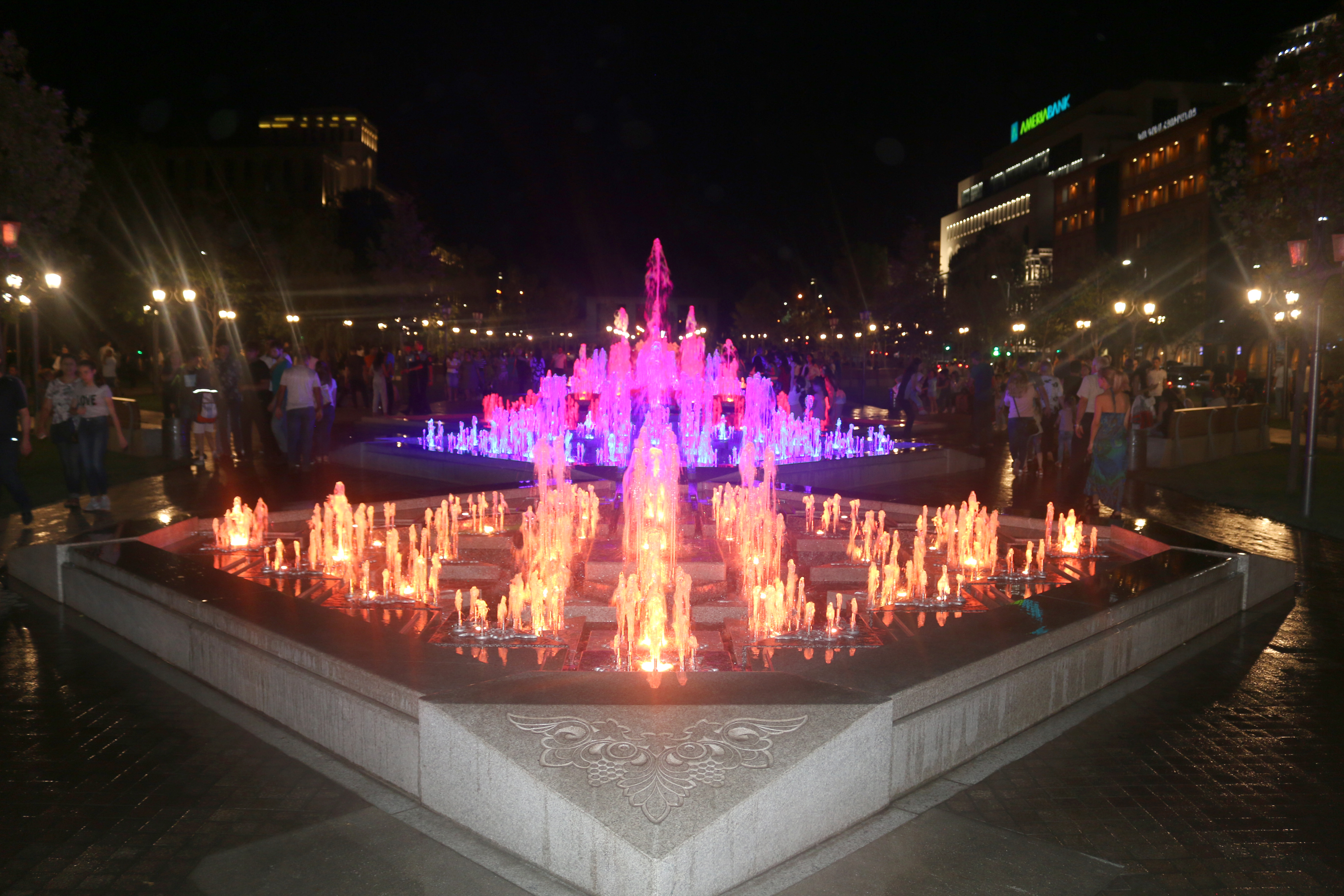
Fountains with granite basins

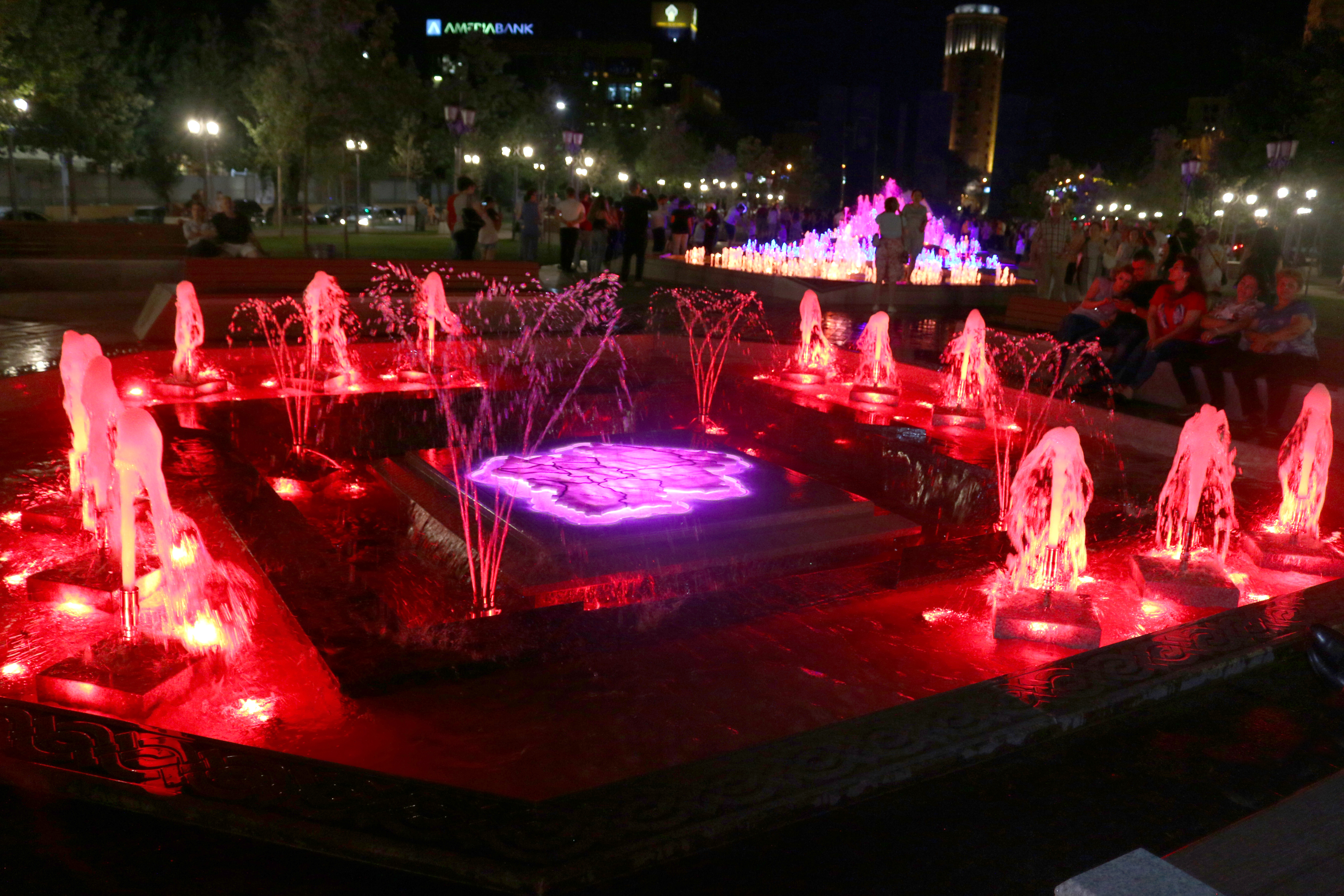
Quartzite map engraved with the 12 administrative districts of Yerevan

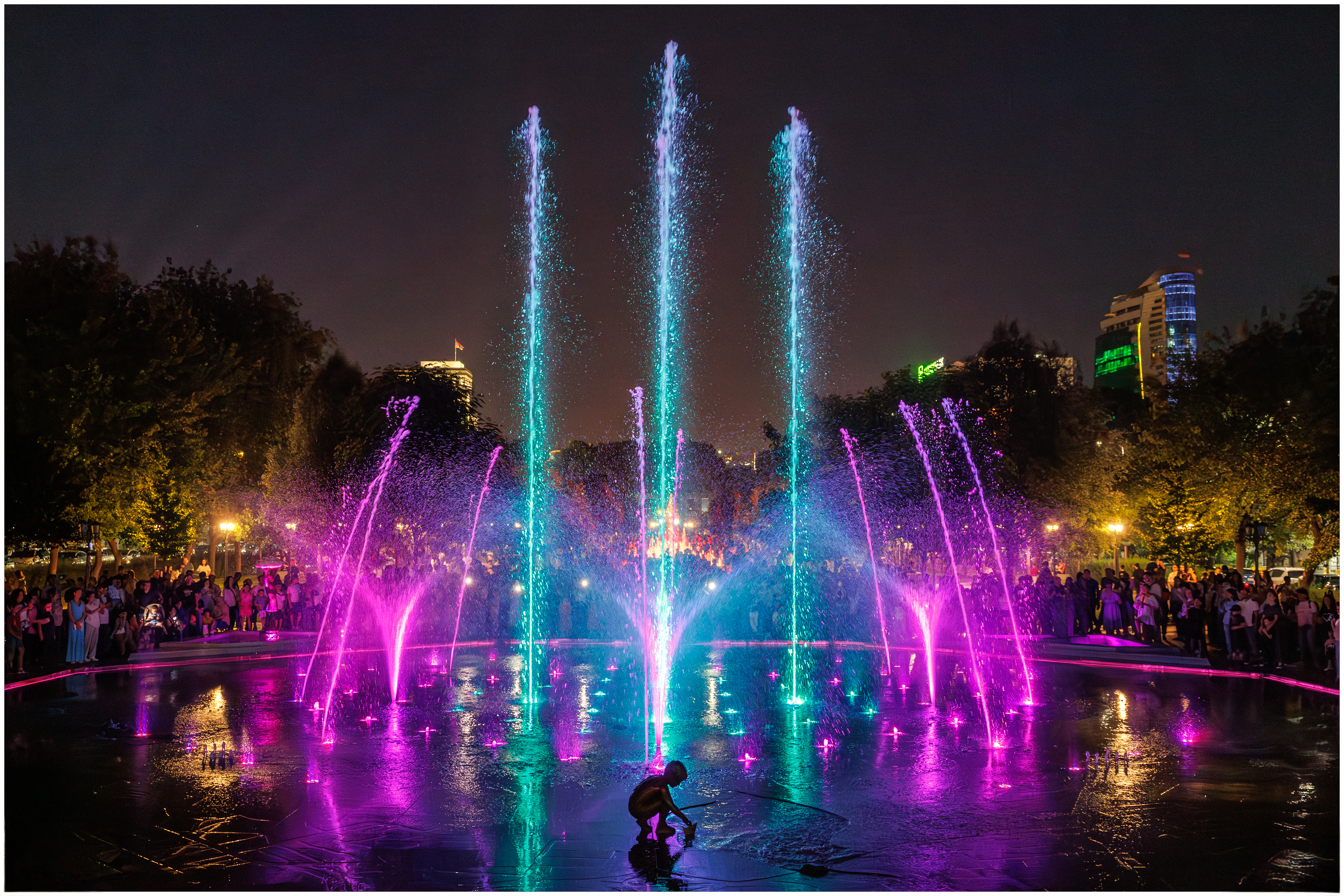
Engraved square in the shape of Yerevan's map, featuring upward water jets

== Block Pavement ==
The block pavement of the park with total area of 5.420 sq.m is made of 500,000 pieces of 7 colours of granite cobbles 10x10x5 cm in size. The pavement patterns of the park are almost entirely taken from the ornaments of ancient traditional Armenian carpets, and part of the ornaments repeats the patterns of Erebuni fortress of the Urartian era.

In the center of the pavement there is a narrow oblong rug path decorated with patterns of Armenian carpets. The decoration system of carpets, particularly of “ Chartar” type, characterized by interconnected chains of diamond-shaped large creations is in the base of the rug structure. The main composition of the late period dragon carpet of “Khndzoresk” type is represented. It contains the symbol of the Sun representing the eternal conflict between good and evil and eight stylizations of the Dragon surrounding the Sun. The patterns of the “tree of life” initiated from the Sun symbol represent the victory of good and the idea of eternal life. The linear version of the central sector of the dragon carpet “Guhar” woven in 1680 is in the center of the large diamond-shaped ornament. The corners are decorated with stylized dragon figures typical to the late period-dragon carpets of “Masyatsotn” type, and with stepped diamond-shaped patterns typical to “Chartar” type carpets.

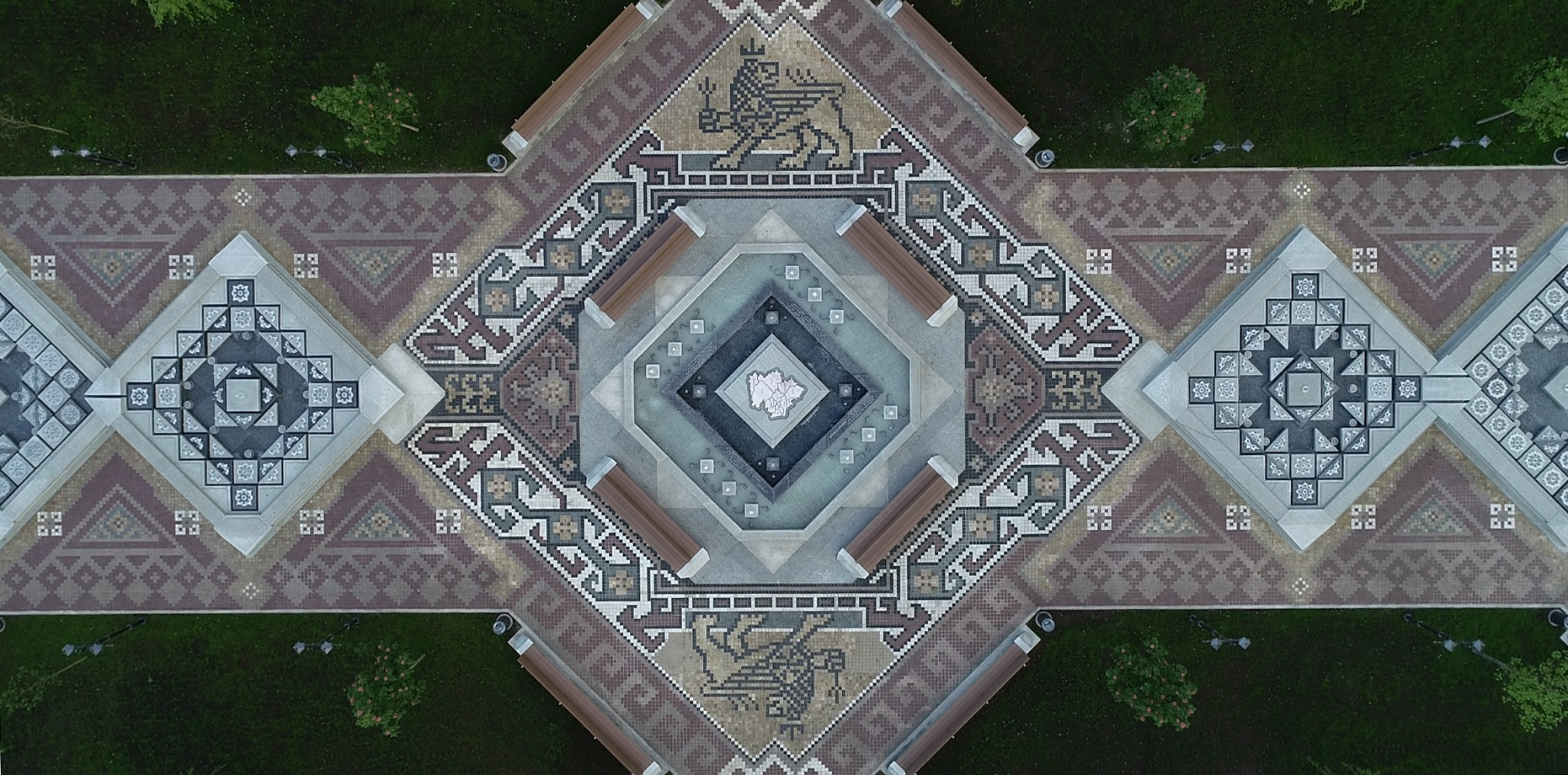
Park paving decorated with traditional Armenian carpet pattern

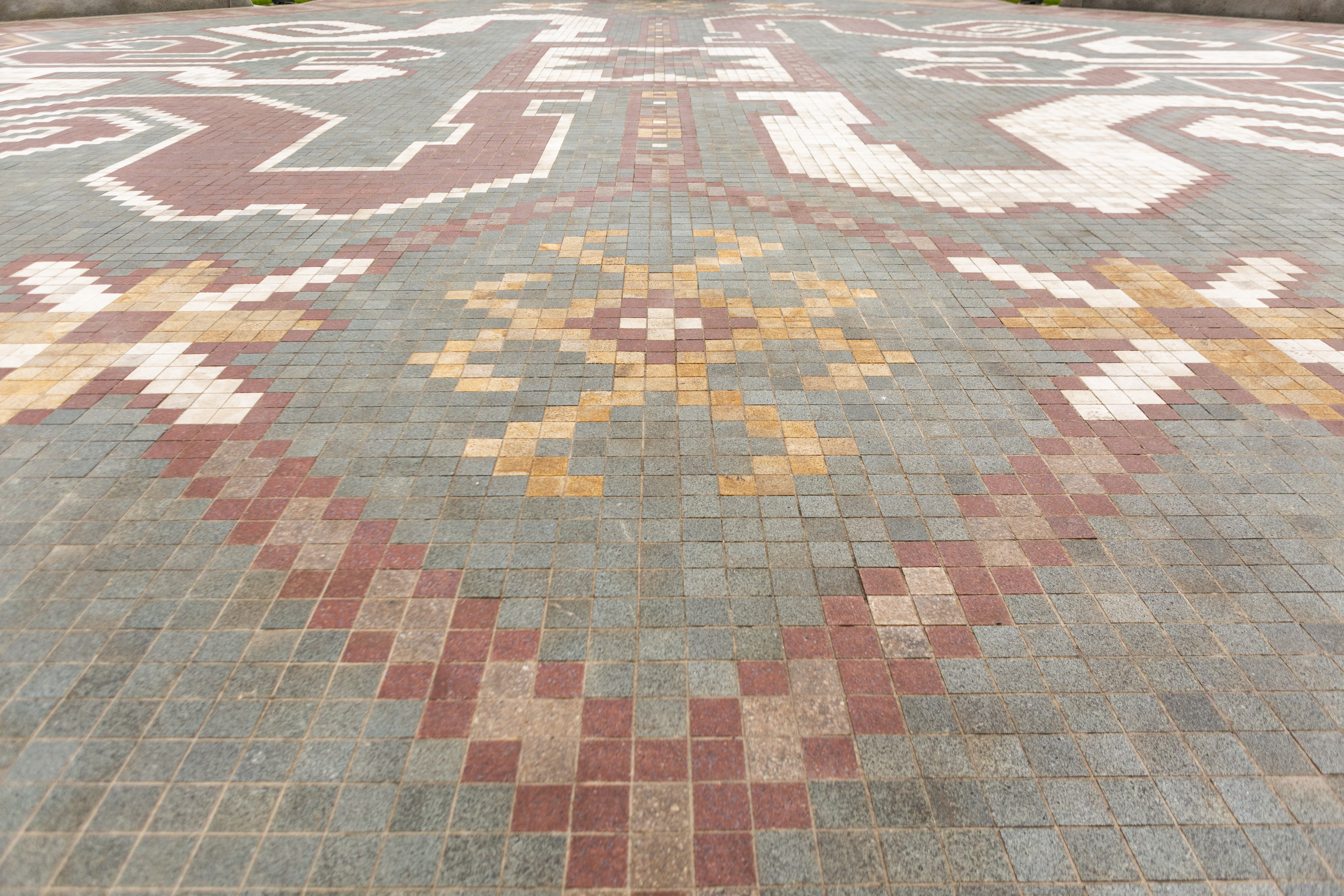
Ornamental motif of the central medallion of the “Khndzoresk” dragon carpet

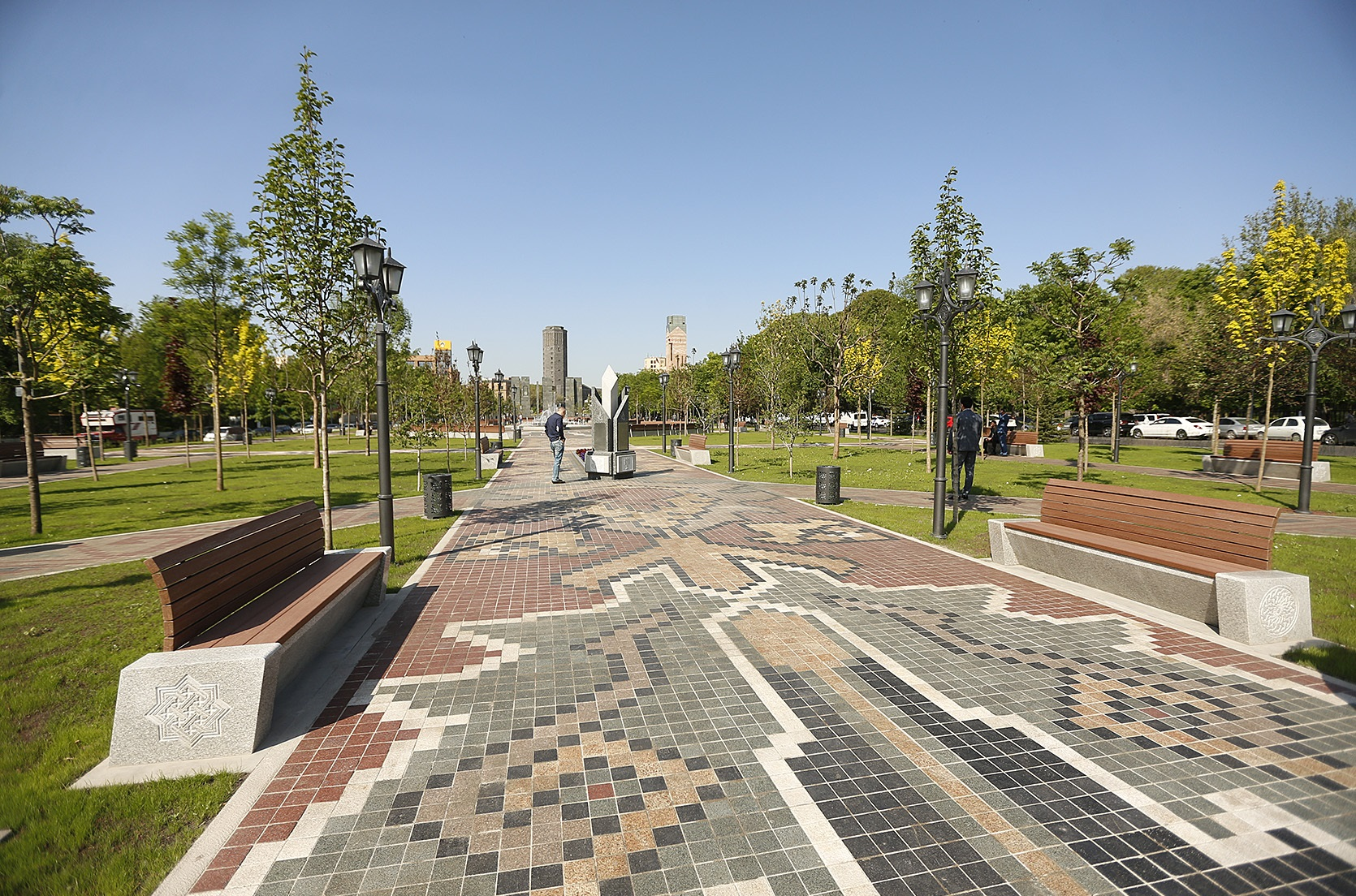
Paving designed with patterns from the “Guhar” dragon carpet

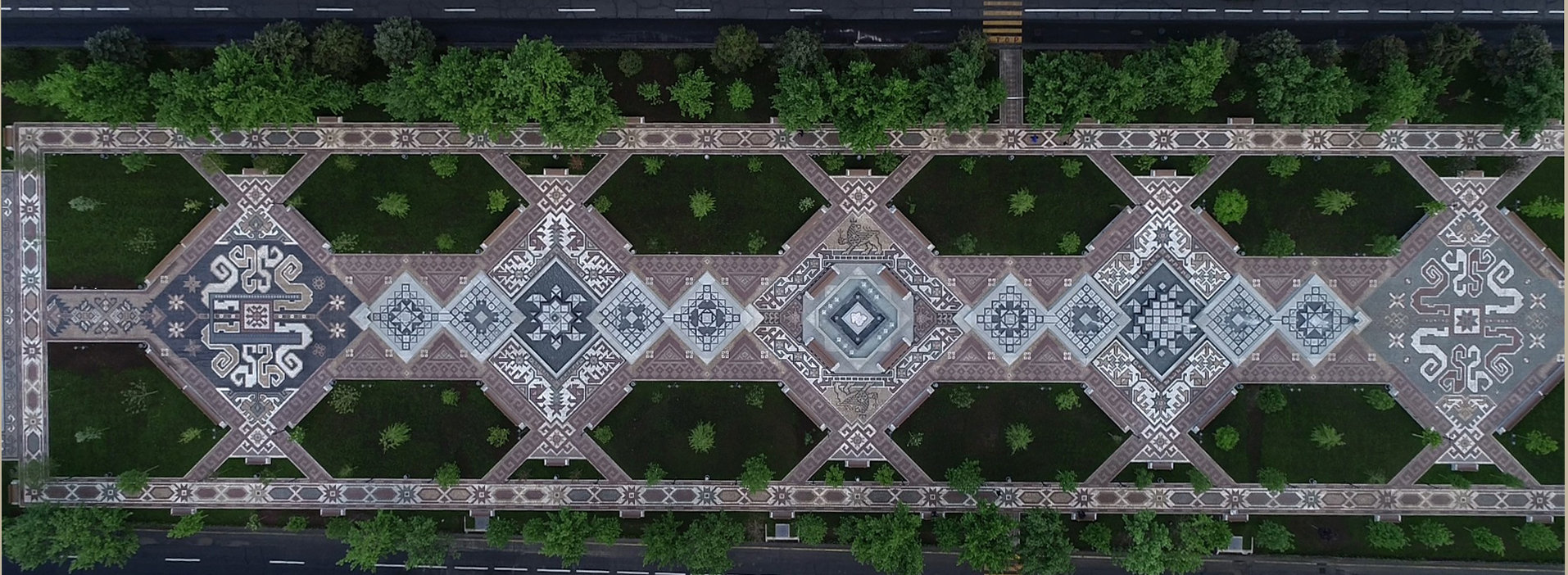
Park paving designed with traditional Armenian carpet pattern

== Statues ==
Seven bronze statues are installed in the park which were ordered and created especially for the Yerevan 2800th Anniversary park. The entrance of the park is decorated with bull and lion bronze statues made by analogy with the frescoes of Erebuni fortress. In four corners of the fountain which has the form of the map of Yerevan there are four bronze statues of children (“Imagination”, “Caring”, “Chastity”, “Happiness”), as well as there is a statue of a child with a boat (“Childhood”) on the site symbolizing the Yerevan lake. The statues represent the images of children of Yerevan city of the 1970s and 1980s.

The statues installed in the park have been created by a group of sculptors headed by Armen Samvelyan.

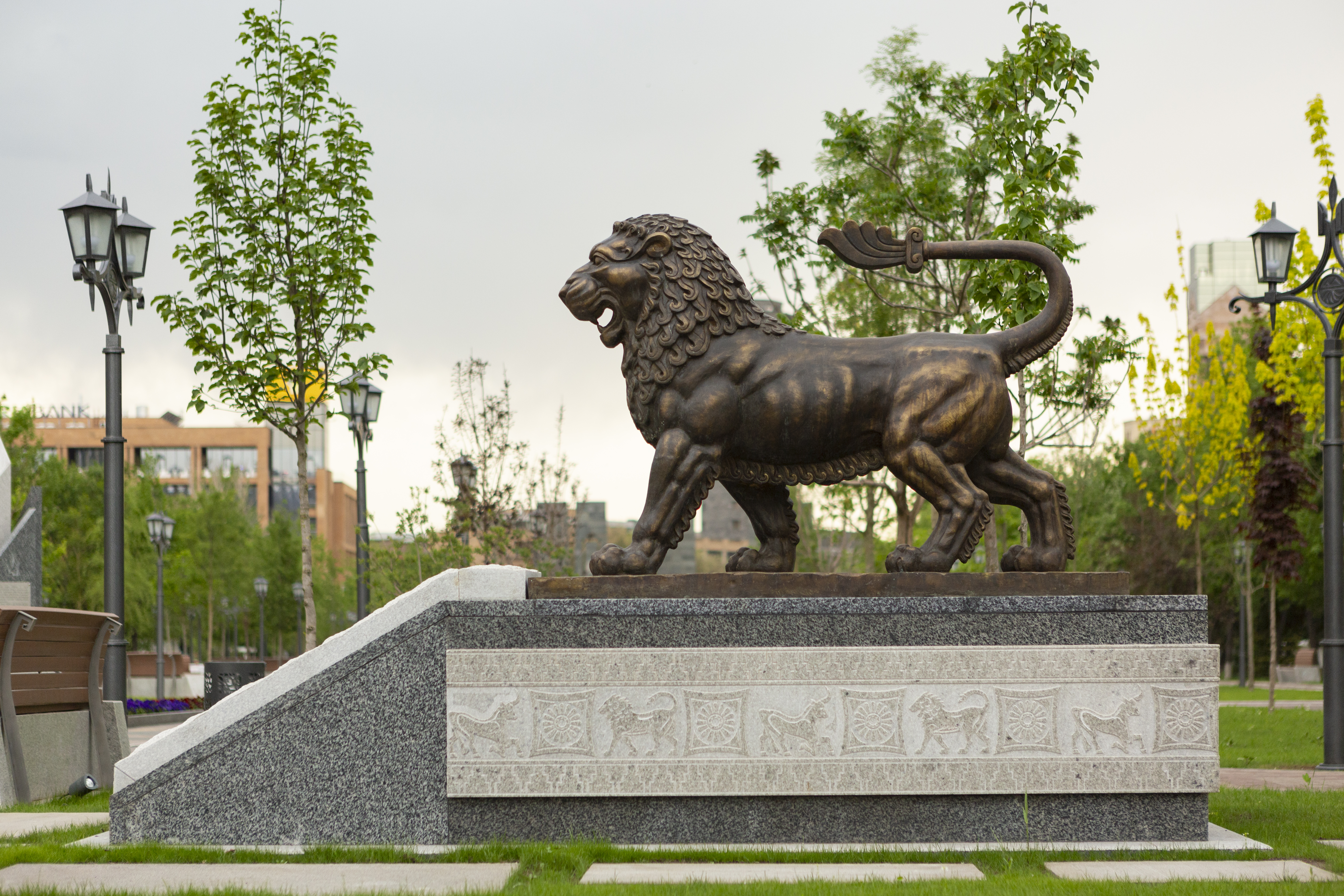
A bronze lion statue is installed at the entrance of the park

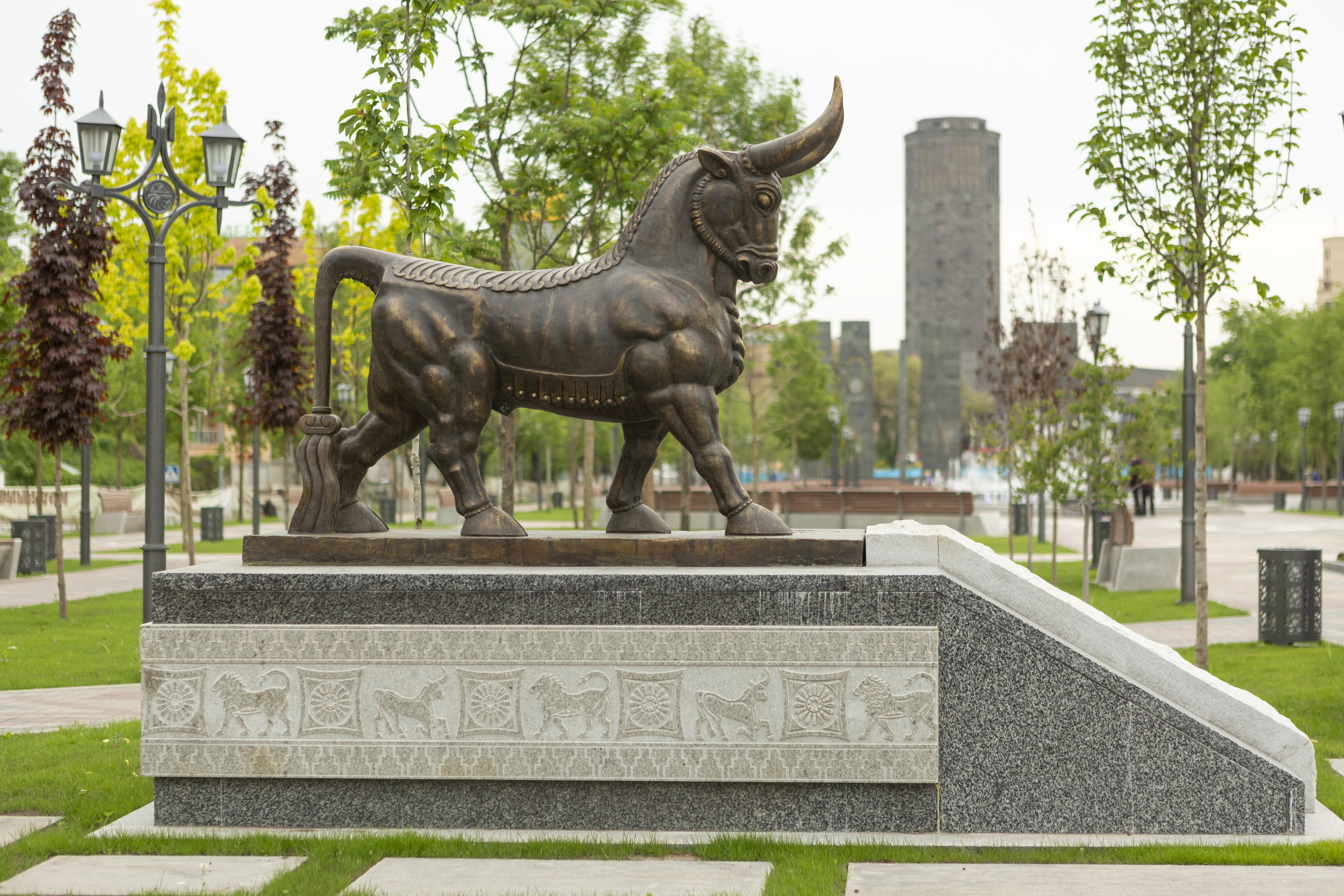
A bronze bull statue is installed at the entrance of the park

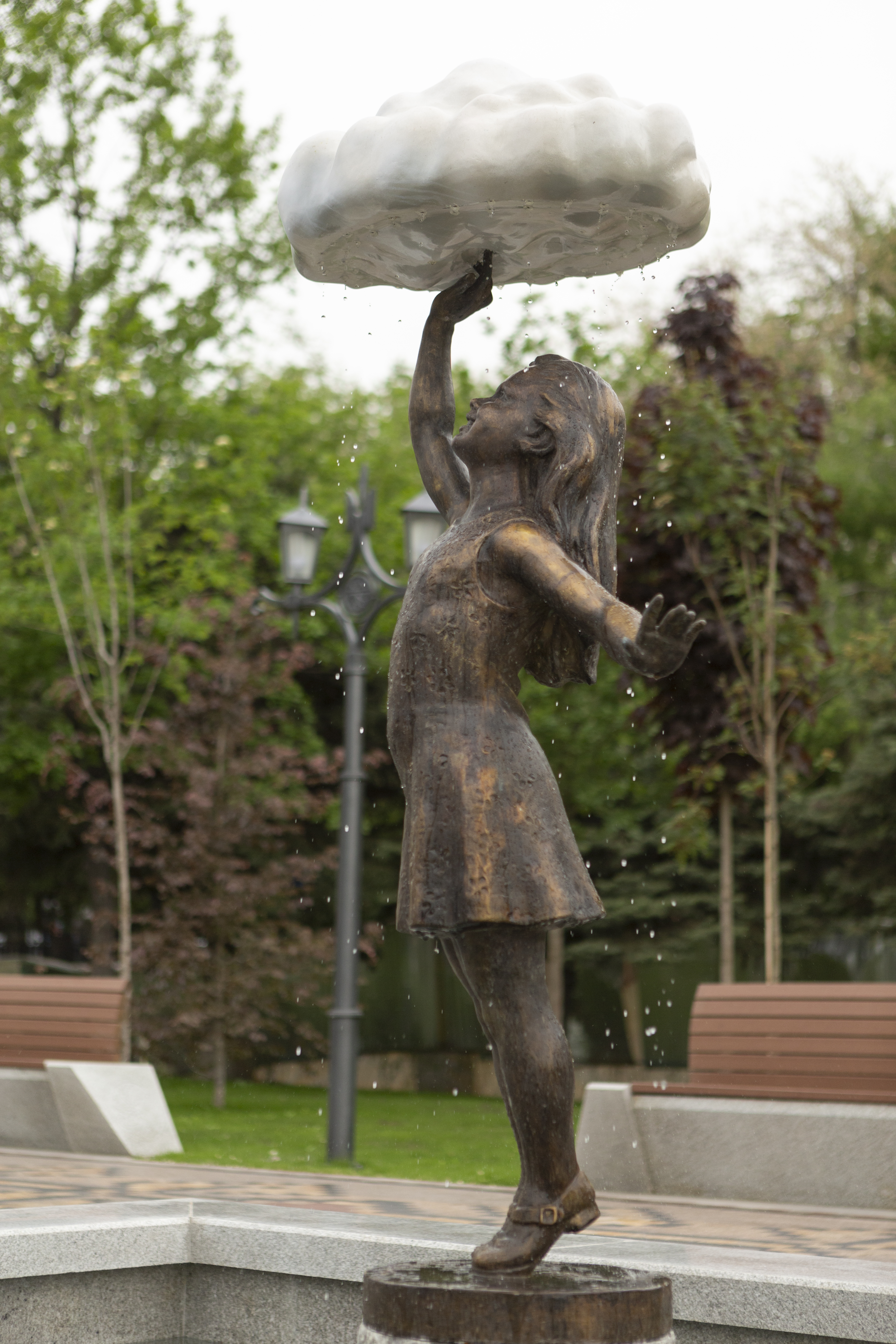
“Imagination”

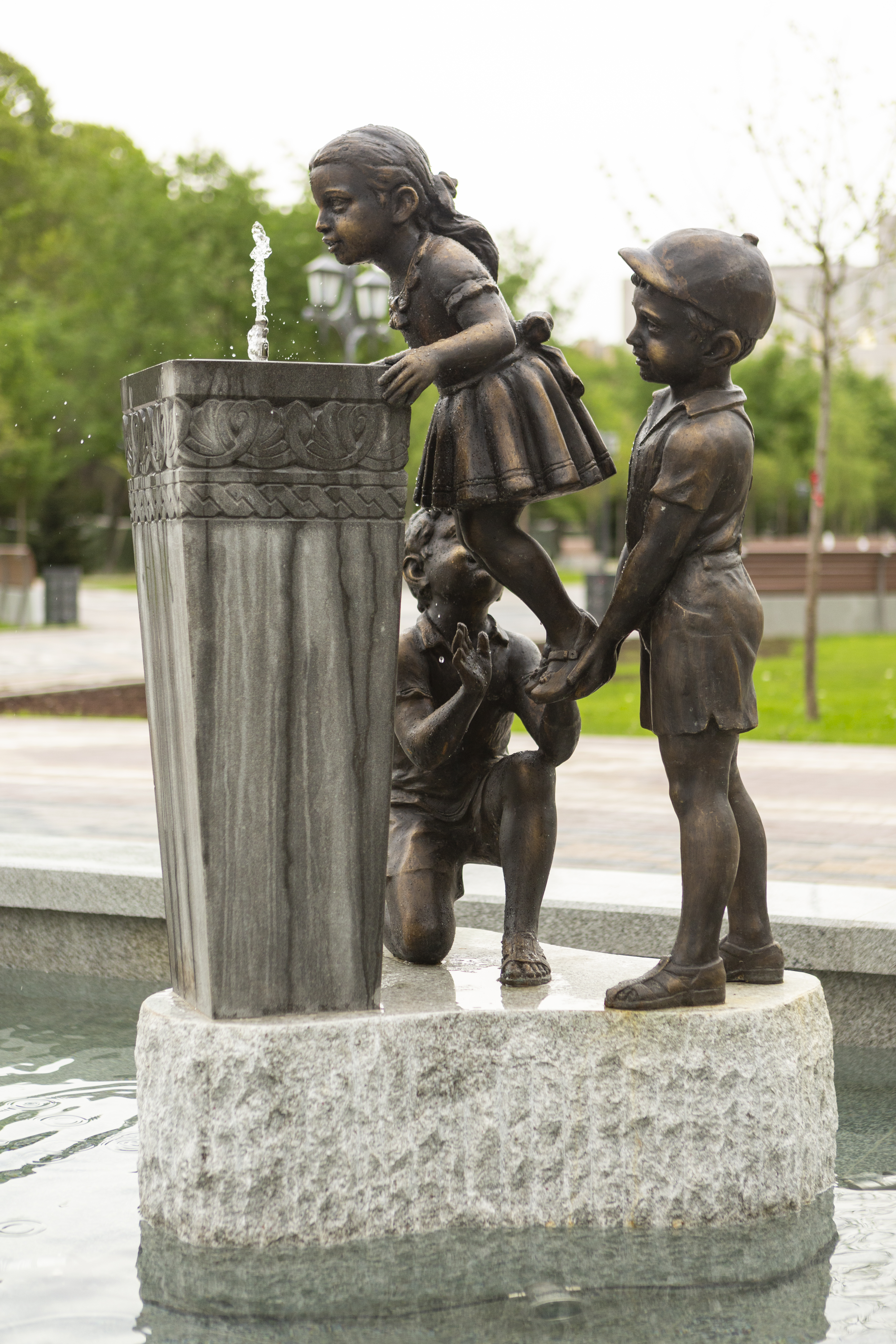
“Caring”

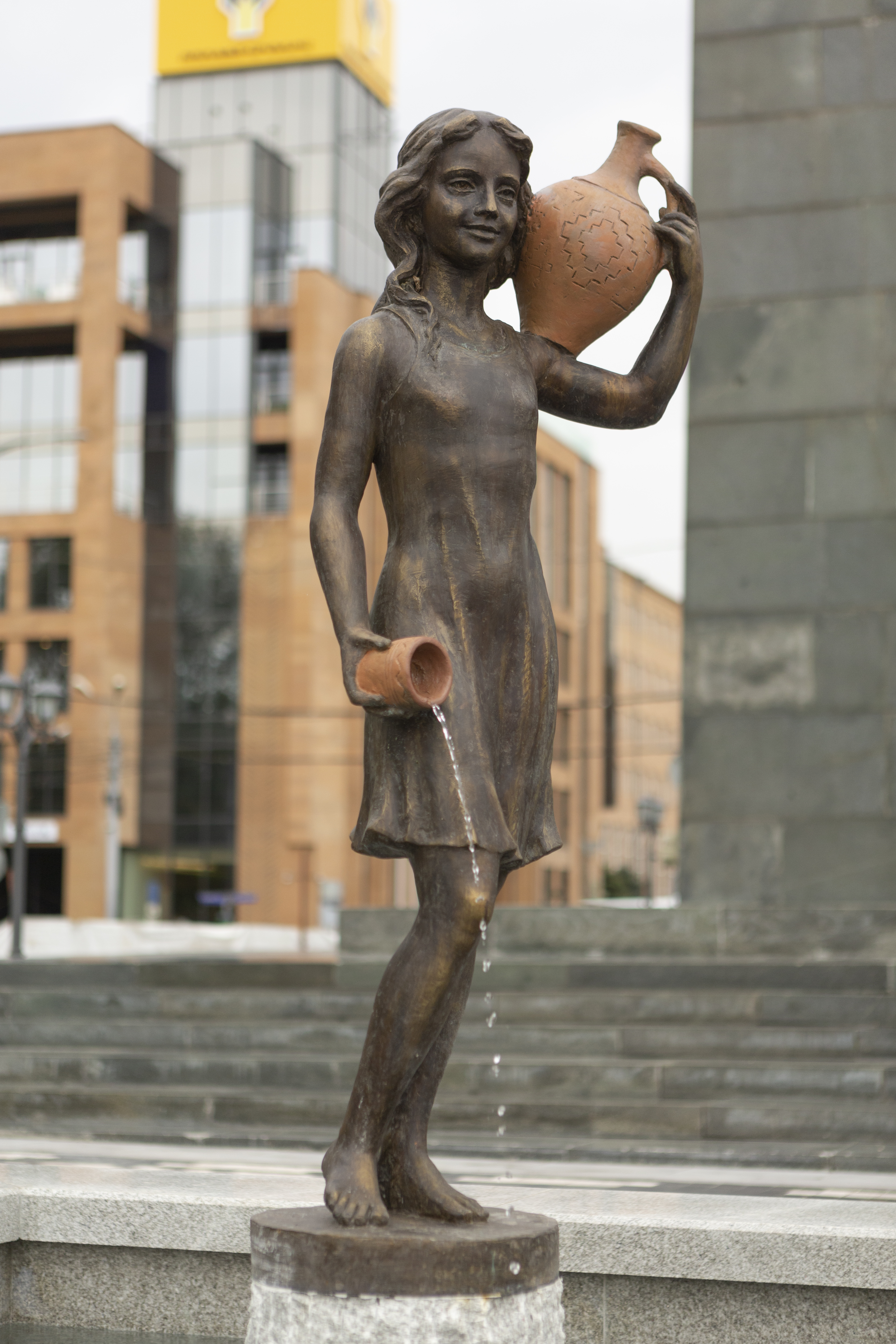
“Chastity”

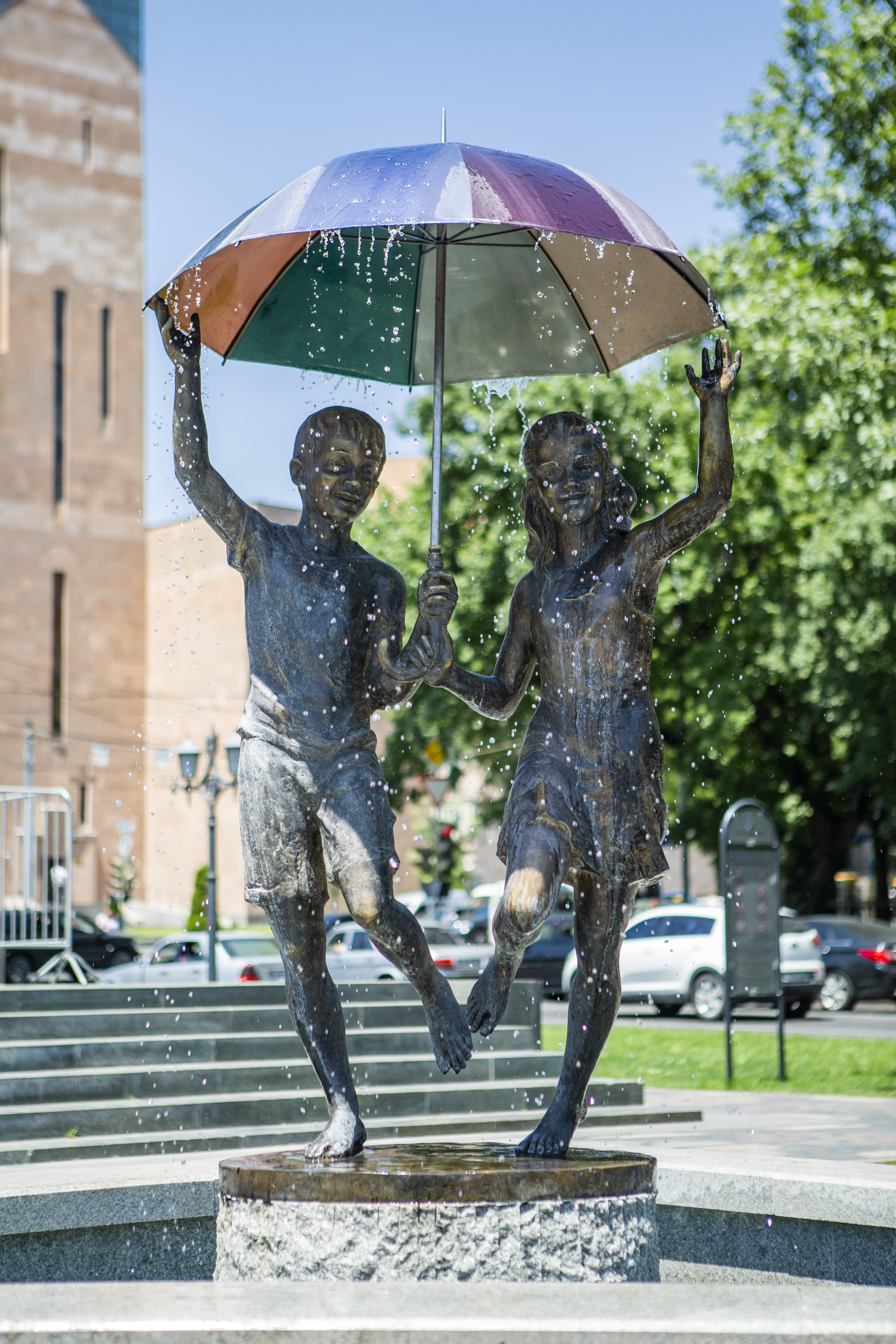
“Happiness”

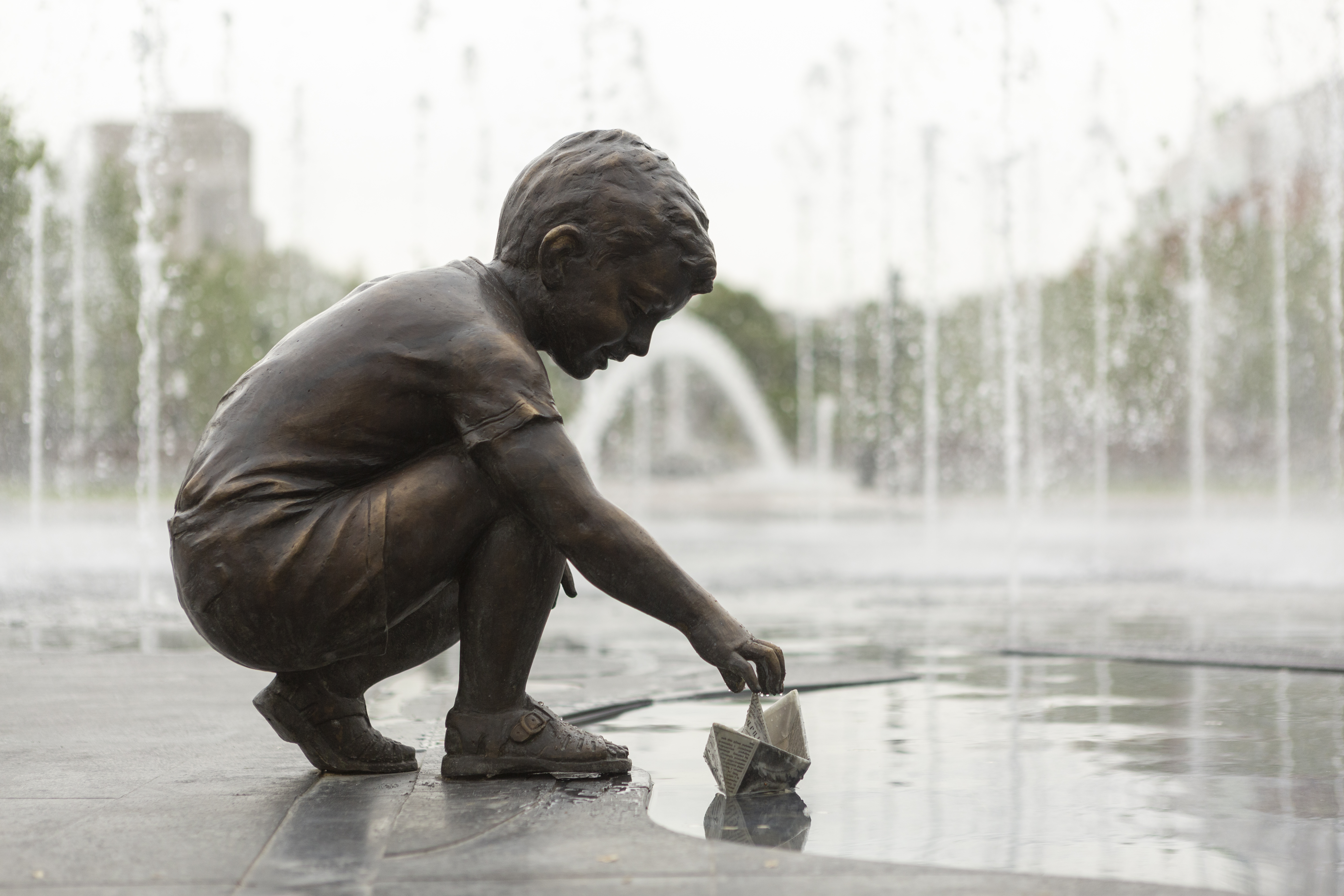
“Childhood”

== Interesting facts ==
- On the territory of the park there are 76 benches, 62 garbage cans and 126 lampposts with original design, specially made for this park.
- The ornaments and aluminum patterns on the granite surfaces of the architectural elements in the park are made with patterns of famous architectural monuments created by Alexander Tamanian, Jim Torosian, Rafayel Israyelian, Stepan Kurkchian and Mark Grigorian.
- At the end of the park there is Alexander Miasnikian’s statue (sculptor Ara Shiraz, architect Jim Torosian), erected in 1980. During 2020-2022, the monument complex, which was in unsafe state of disrepair, was restored with the initiative and financing of Mikael and Karen Vardanyan.
- A wind sensor is installed in the park, by which, depending on the strength of the wind, the arched fountain automatically turns off, and the water jets of the other fountains are reduced in order not to spray visitors.
- In the park there is an obelisk with symbols of Erebuni fortress and Yerevan city, presenting brief information about the park in 4 languages.
- Thanks to the financial support of philanthropists Mikael and Karen Vardanyan, the park remains the property of the Yerevan community, and any entrepreneurial activity within its territory is prohibited.
- The entrance to the park is free.
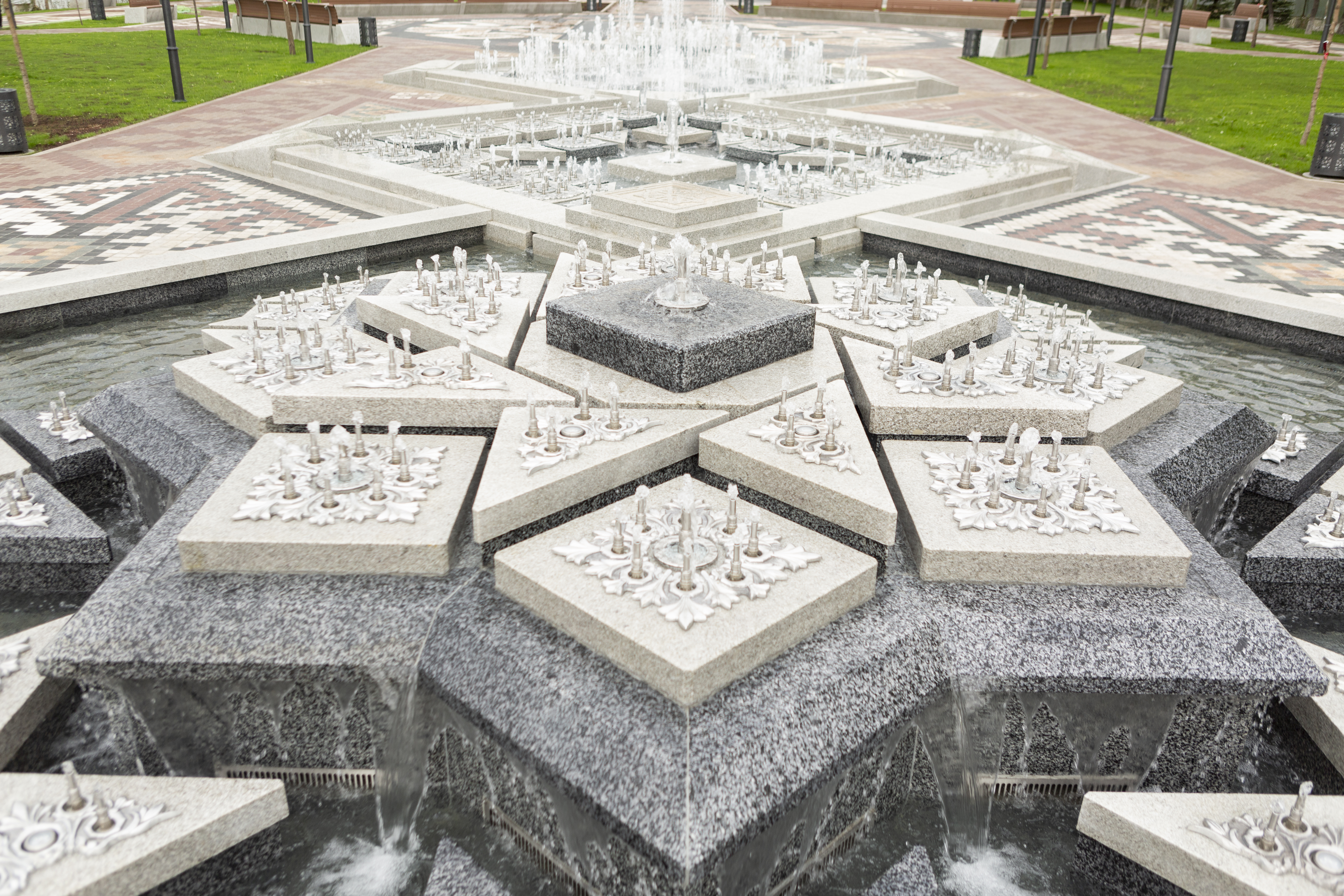
Aluminum patterns of the fountains

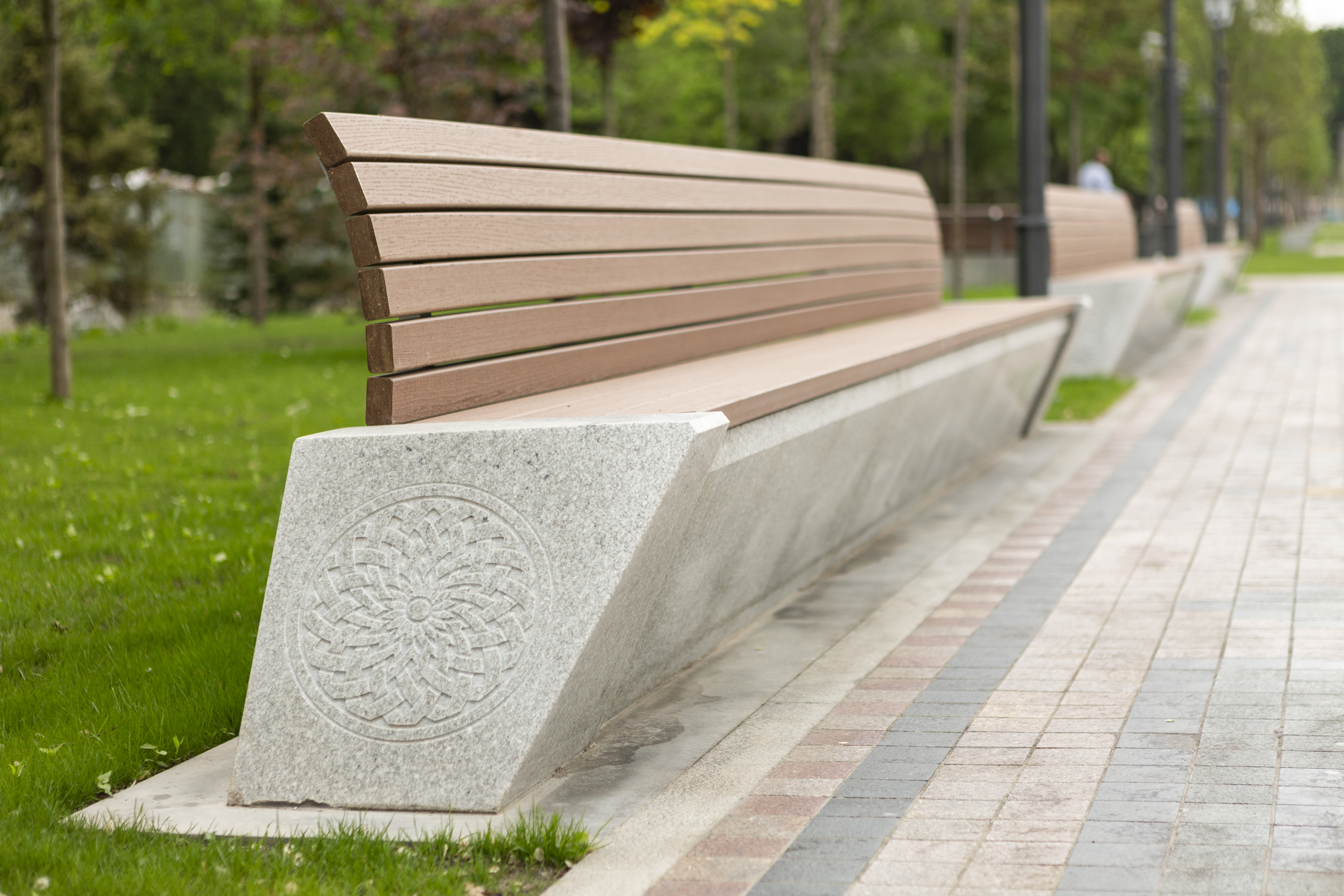
Benches installed within the park grounds

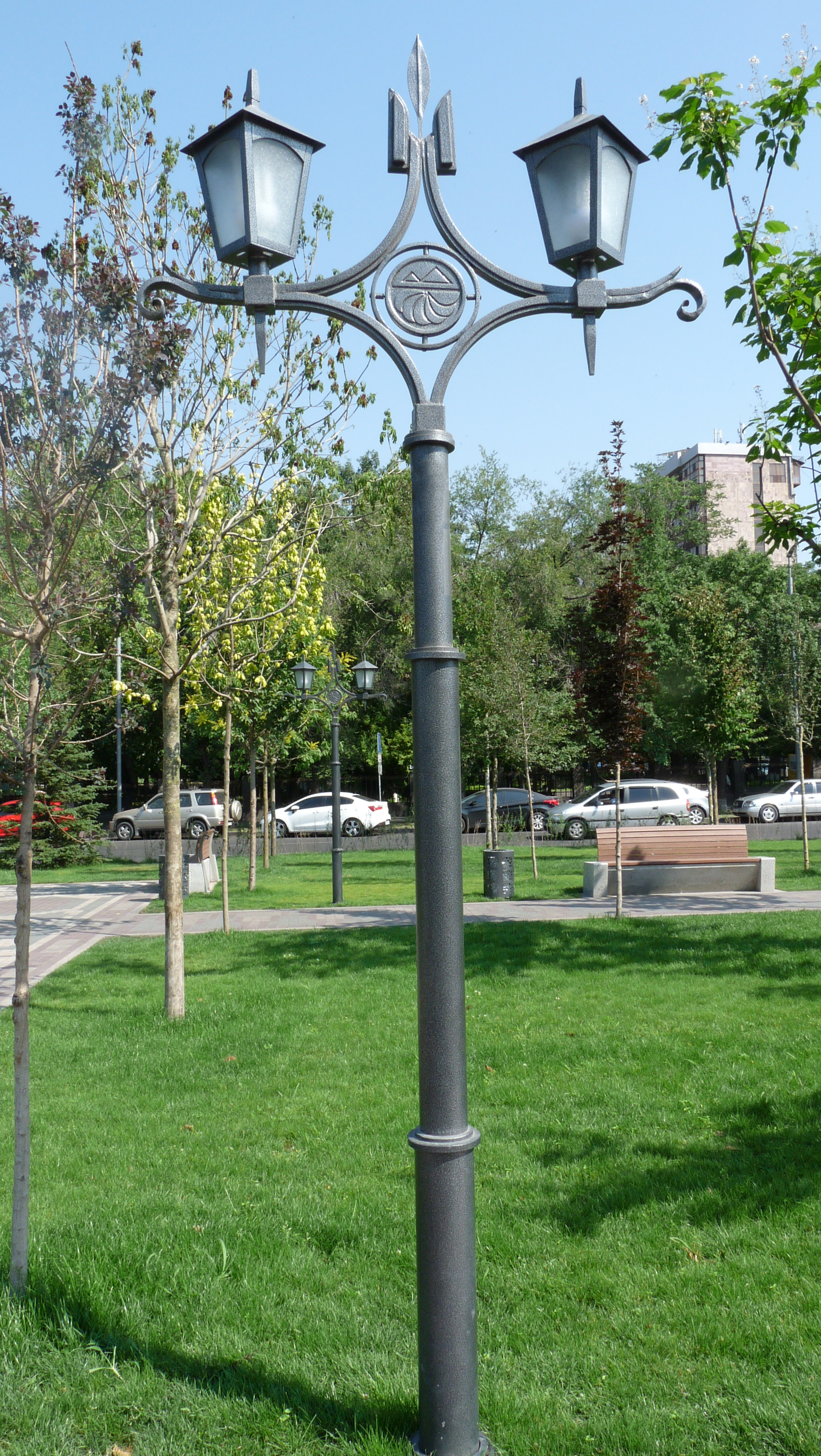
Lampposts installed throughout the park
