= English Park, Yerevan =

Park in Yerevan, Armenia

English Park
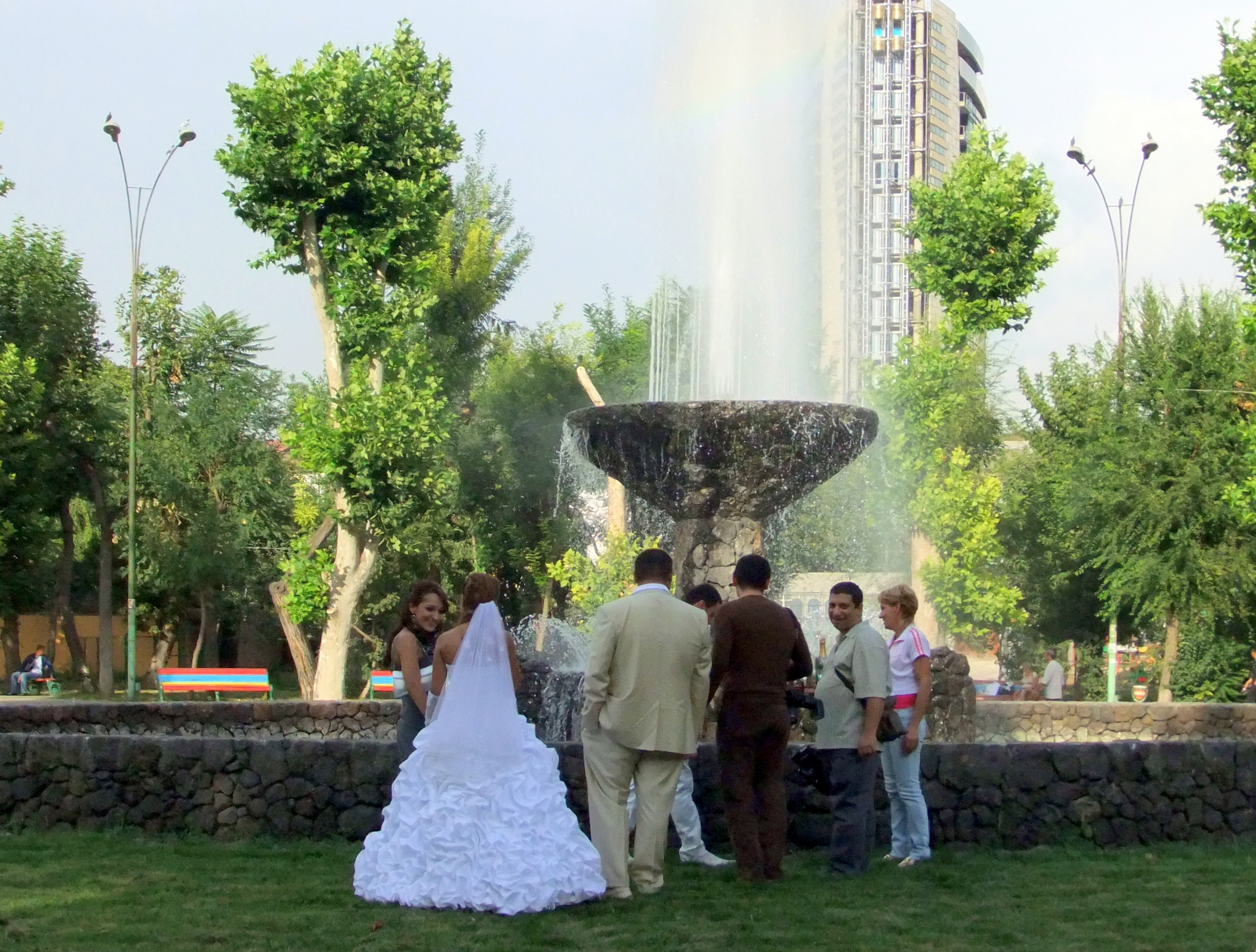
- Newly-married couple around the central fountain of the English Park
- Interactive map of English Park
- Type: Public
- Location: Kentron district, Yerevan, Armenia
- Coordinates: 40°10′27″N 44°30′29″E
- Area: 5.5 hectares (14 acres)
- Created: 1860s reopened 3 October 1910
- Operator: Yerevan City Council
- Status: Open all year

The English Park (Armenian: Անգլիական այգի, Angliakan aygi) is a public park in Yerevan, Armenia, located on Italy Street. It occupies an area of 5.5 hectares in the central Kentron district of the city, just to the south of the Republic Square.

== History ==
The English Park is one of the oldest parks in the city of Yerevan, dating back to the 1860s. It was frequently renovated until World War I, with a major renovation in 1910. In 1920, the English Park hosted the first ever football match in the modern history of Armenia, when the teams of Yerevan and Alexandropol met each other. During the Soviet period the park was renamed after the 26 Baku Commissars. After the independence of Armenia, the original name of the park was restored.

In the early 2000s the park lost much of its territory. A new road, Italy Street, was sliced through its northern side, isolating part of the park from the remainder. Along one side of that new road a series of buildings were constructed on former park land, including the French embassy in Armenia, the Italian embassy in Armenia, and the Best Western Congress Hotel of Yerevan. The isolated part was later redeveloped as Yerevan 2800th Anniversary Park. The Sundukyan Academic Theatre is located on the periphery of the Park.

A monument to Gabriel Sundukyan's fictional character Pepo was erected in the park in 1976.

The central fountains are a popular location for wedding photographs.

== Gallery ==
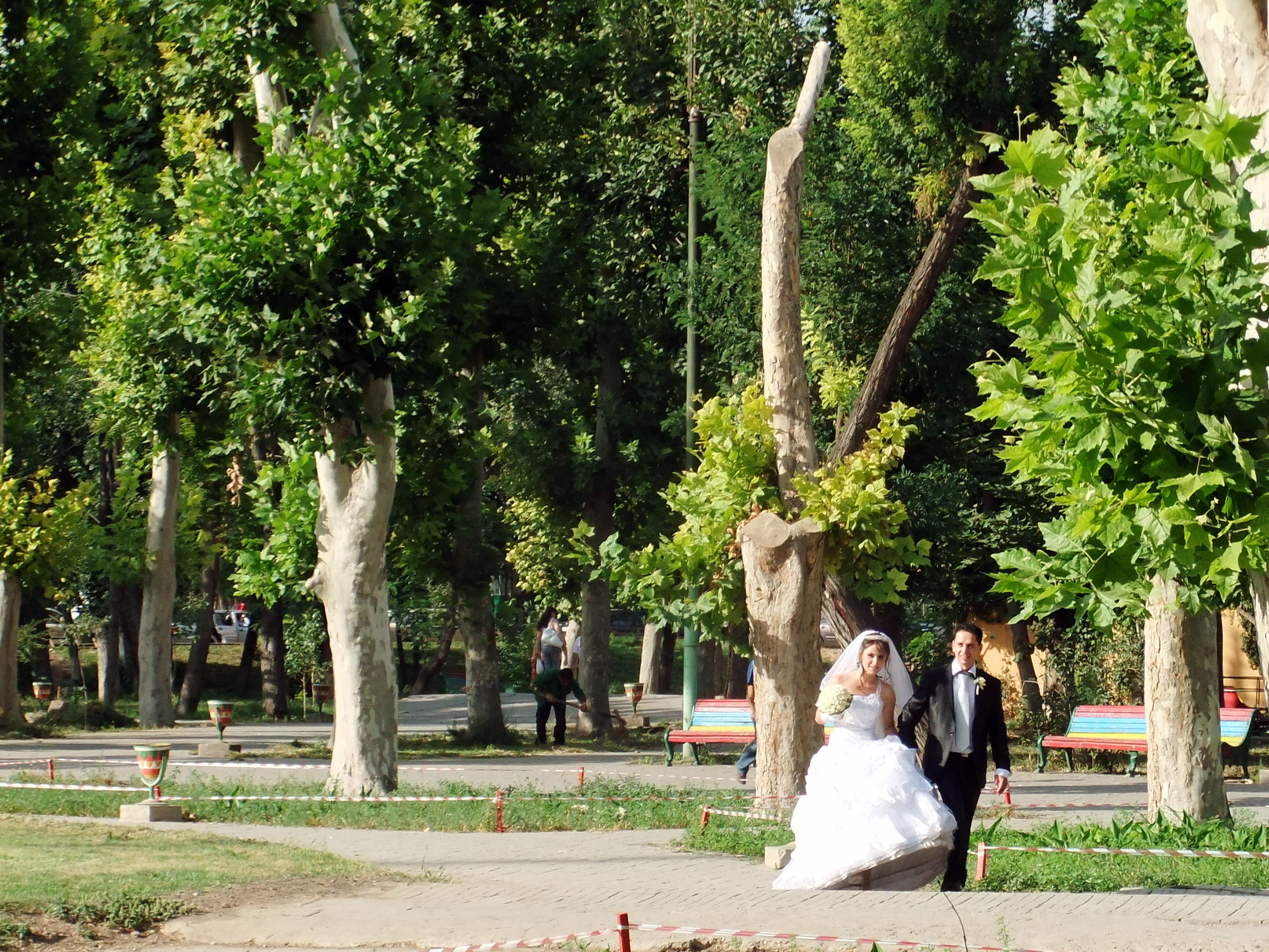
View from the park

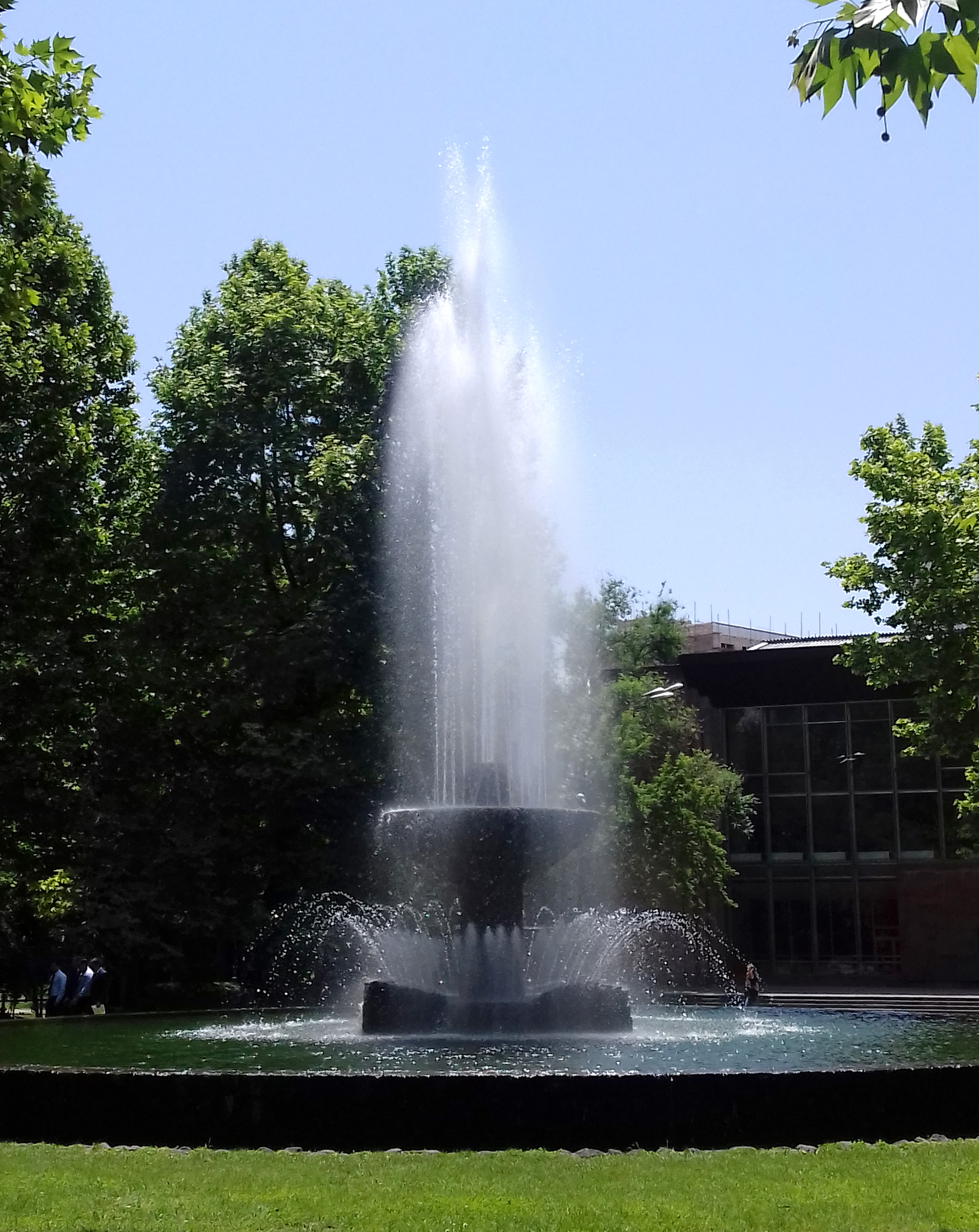
Fountain in the park

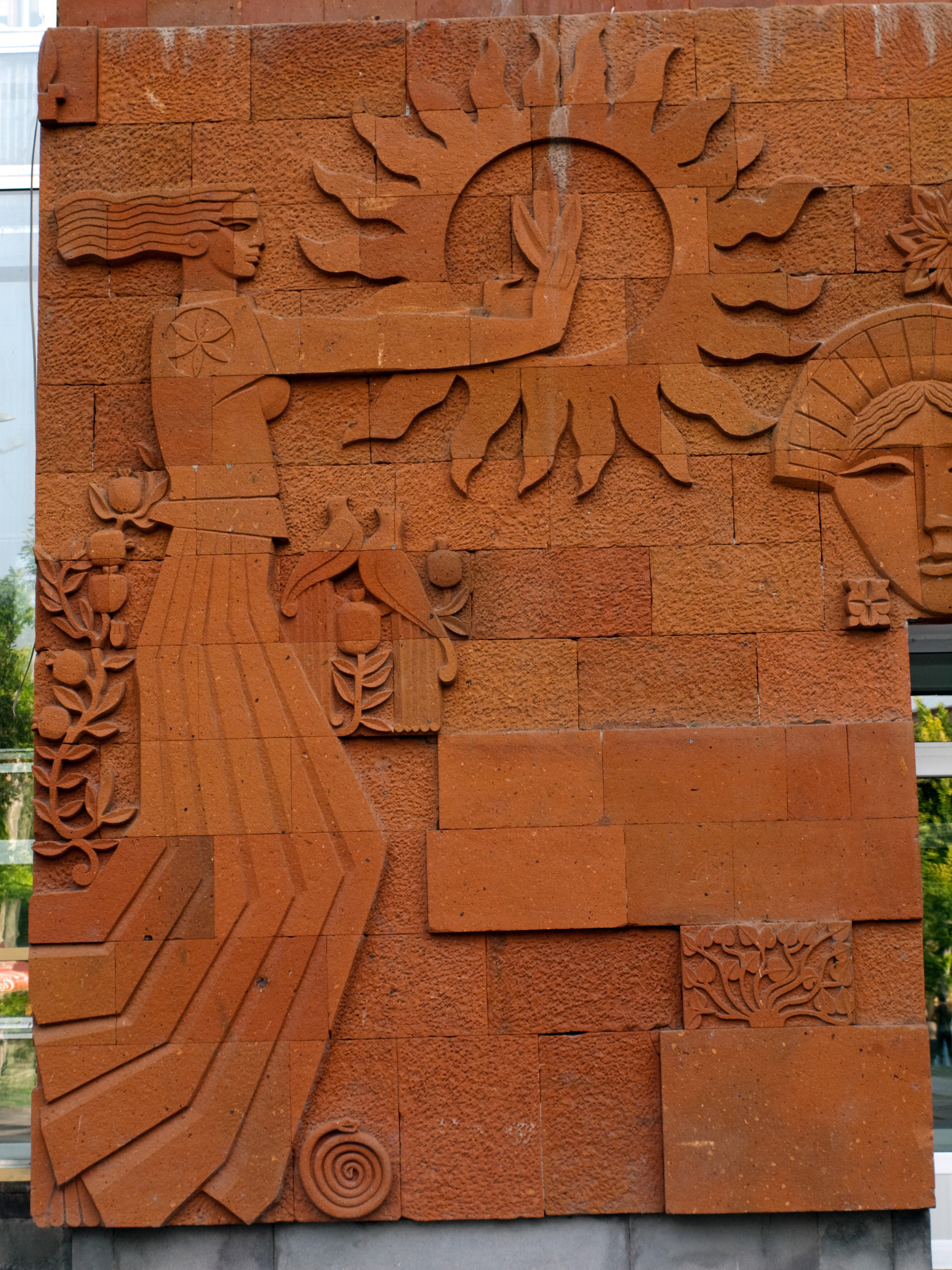
Monument in the park

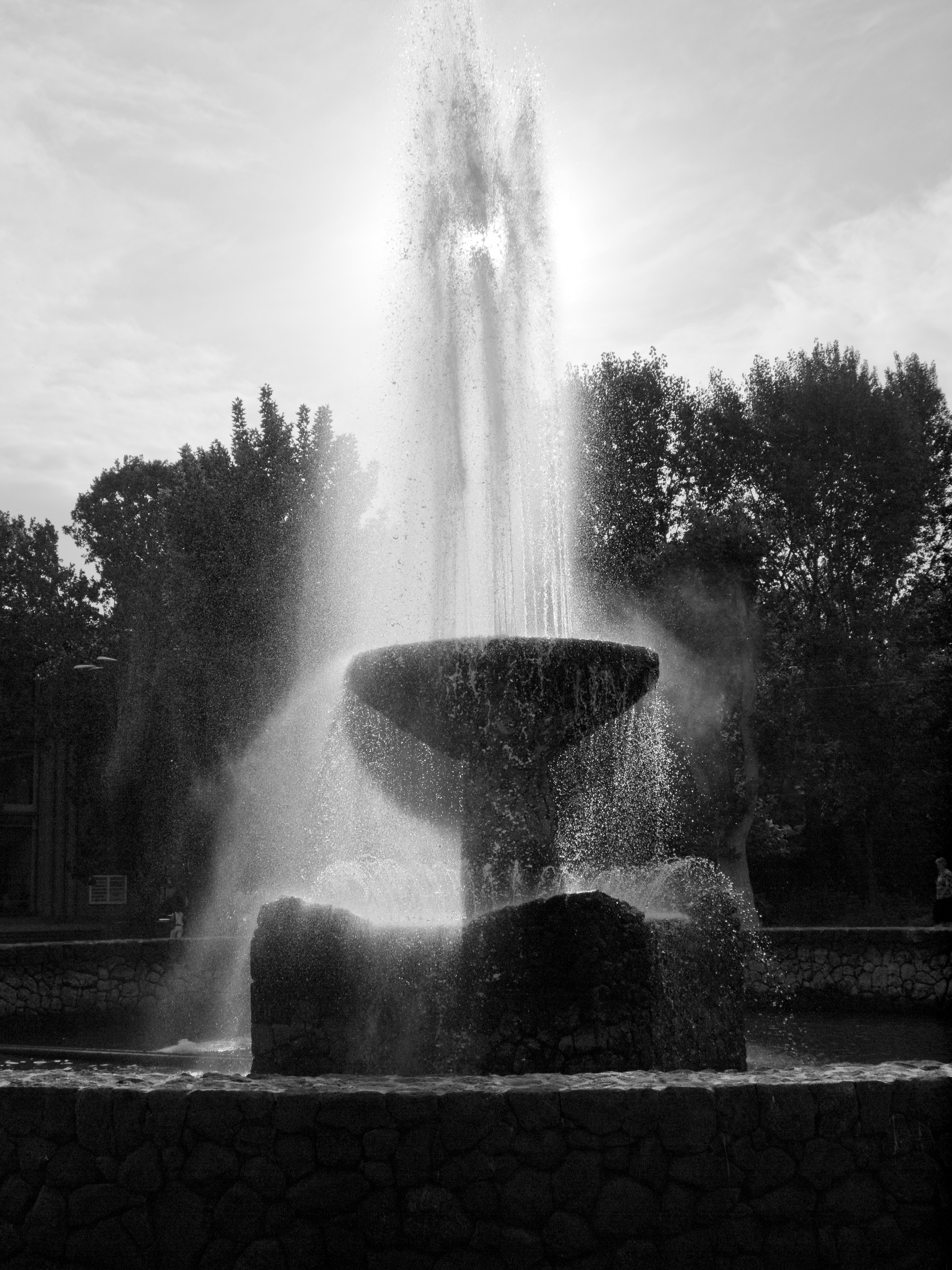
The central fountain
