= Mikael Vardanyan =

Armenian businessman (born 1973)

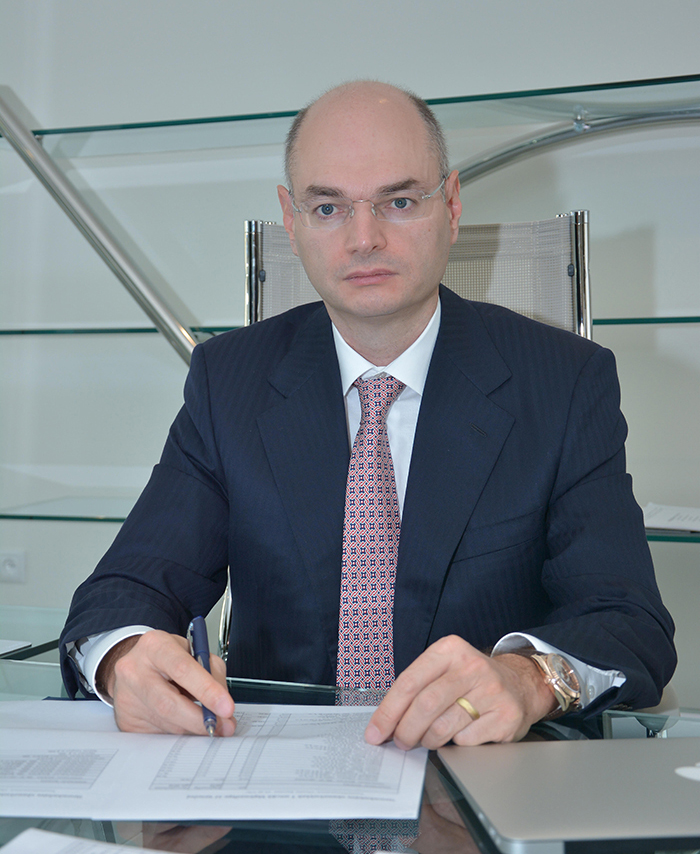
- Born: June 11, 1973 (age 53); Yerevan, Armenian SSR, USSR
- Education: Yerevan Polytechnic Institute, (1995)
- Occupation: businessman
- Organization: Grand Holding
- Parent(s): father: Hrant Vardanyan mother: Zina Muruzyan
- Relatives: brother: Karen Vardanyan
- Awards: The Medal of Mkhitar Gosh

Mikael Vardanyan (Armenian: Միքայել Վարդանյան, June 11, 1973, Yerevan, Armenian SSR, USSR) is an Armenian businessman and philanthropist who is the owner of Grand Holding, the eldest son of Hrant Vardanyan.

== Early life and education ==
Mikael Vardanyan was born on June 11, 1973, in Yerevan, Armenian Soviet Socialist Republic, in the family of Hrant Vardanyan and Zina Muruzyan. In 1990 he graduated from secondary school No. 132. From 1990 to 1995 studied at Yerevan Polytechnic Institute.

== Career ==
From 1992 to 1995 he worked in OJSC Grand Club and from 2002 to 2003 was the executive director of the JV International Masis Tabak Co Ltd. From 2003 to 2012 was a member of the National Assembly of the Republic of Armenia, non-Party.

Since 2012 Mikael and Karen Vardanyan have been managing the Grand Holding founded by Hrant Vardanyan. Since 2007 Grand Holding has been the first taxpayer, exporter and employer in the sphere of production of the RA. For outstanding state and social activities, on September 14, 2011, Mikael Vardanyan was awarded the Medal of Mkhitar Gosh.

== Recognition ==
For his contribution to the development of Masis community, on October 10, 2024, Mikael Vardanyan was awarded the title of Honorary Citizen of Masis community.

== Charity ==
Mikael Vardanyan also implemented a number of charity projects. The philanthropist provides financial assistance to people with disabilities, mothers of large families and single mothers, families of deceased soldiers, special schools, government medical institutions, provides agricultural equipment to low-income rural families, etc. Within the scope of charitable programs, with the financing of Mikael Vardanyan, various large-scale projects of the communities infrastructure improvement were implemented in the border communities of the Tavush region.

In 2015, together with his brother Karen Vardanyan, Mikael Vardanyan completed the construction of the Saint Thaddeus Church in Masis, undertaken with the funding of their father Hrant Vardanyan.

In 2019, with the initiative and the financing of Mikael and Karen Vardanyan the Yerevan 2800th Anniversary Park was built. Besides the construction of the park the Vardanyan Family Charity Foundation, starting from 2019 and for the next 99 years will also cover all the expenses of care and maintenance of the park.

== Personal life ==
Married, has three children. Lives in Yerevan.

He likes and plays squash and basketball.
