= Tsaturyan =

Tsaturyan (also spelled Tsaturian, Zaturian, Zaduryan) is an Armenian surname. Popular people with this surname include:

- Alexander Tsaturyan (1865–1917), was an Armenian poet and translator.
- Edmund Tsaturyan (1937–2010), was an Armenian politician.
- Nikolay Tsaturyan (born 1945), Armenian theatre director, actor and playwright.
