= Karen Vardanyan =

Armenian businessman

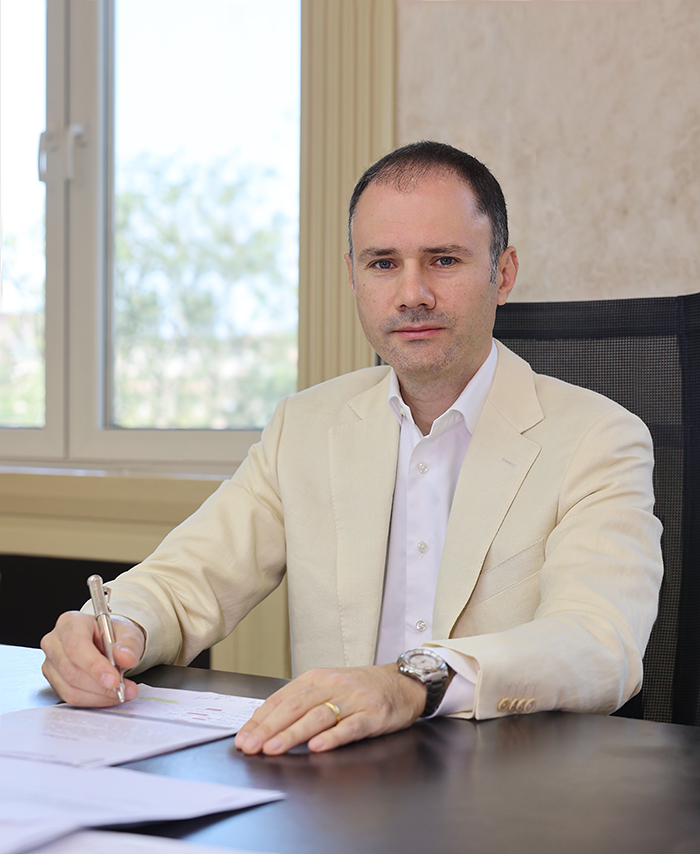
- Born: 30 November 1976 (age 49); Yerevan, Armenian SSR, USSR
- Education: Concordia University (2001)
- Occupation: businessman
- Organization: Grand Holding
- Parent(s): father: Hrant Vardanyan mother: Zina Muruzyan
- Relatives: brother: Mikael Vardanyan
- Awards: The Medal of Gratitude

Karen Vardanyan (Armenian: Կարեն Վարդանյան, November 30, 1976, Yerevan, Armenian SSR, USSR) is an Armenian businessman, philanthropist, owner of Grand Holding, the youngest son of Hrant Vardanyan.

== Biography ==
Karen Vardanyan was born on November 30, 1976, in Yerevan, in the family of Hrant Vardanyan and Zina Muruzyan. In 1993 he graduated from secondary school No. 132. In 1997 graduated from the Faculty of Commerce at Dawson College in Montreal, Canada, and in 2001 from the Faculty of International Business at Concordia University with a bachelor's degree in commerce.

From 2001 to 2007 he worked as a producer in the Hayrenik television company. From 2002 to 2007, he managed the Grand Candy LLC. In 2007–2012 was a member of the National Assembly of the Republic of Armenia, non-Party. 2013-2020 supervised the AR television company and was the author of a number of television projects.

== Activity ==
Since 2012, together with his brother Mikael Vardanyan, Vardanyan has managed the Grand Holding, founded by Hrant Vardanyan. Since 2007, Grand Holding has been the first taxpayer in the sphere of production of the Republic of Armenia, the largest exporter of finished goods, also is the largest employer of the industrial sector. For his major personal contribution to the development of the economy, on September 17, 2016, Vardanyan was awarded the Medal of Gratitude.

== Charity ==
Karen Vardanyan implements various charitable projects: large-scale program of financial assistance to the medical institutions, population reproduction and environmental programs, socially disadvantaged families, families with the children with disabilities, orphanages, etc.

In 2015 Karen Vardanyan and Mikael Vardanyan completed the construction of the Saint Thaddeus Church in Masis, undertaken with the finаncing of their father Hrant Vardanyan.

With financing from Karen and Mikayel Vardanyan, as well as according to Karen Vardanyan's design project and under his direct supervision, Yerevan 2800th Anniversary Park was built in 2019. The Vardanian Family Charity Foundation will also cover the expenses of the full care and maintenance of the park for the next 99 years.

== Personal life ==
Vardanyan is married, has three sons, and lives in Yerevan.

He likes football and tennis.
