= Siranush (given name) =

Siranush is a feminine given name of Armenian origin. People with this given name include:

- Siranush (1857–1932), also known as Merope Sahaki Kantarjian, Ottoman Empire-born Armenian actress
- Siranush Andriasian (born 1986), Armenian chess International master
- Siranush Atoyan (1904–1985), Soviet Armenian architect
- Siranush Gasparyan (born 1978), Armenian dramatic soprano
- Siranush Ghukasyan (born 1998), Armenian chess player
- Siranush Harutyunyan (born 1987), known professionally as Sirusho, Armenian singer and songwriter
