= Hrant Vardanyan =

Armenian businessman (1949–2014)

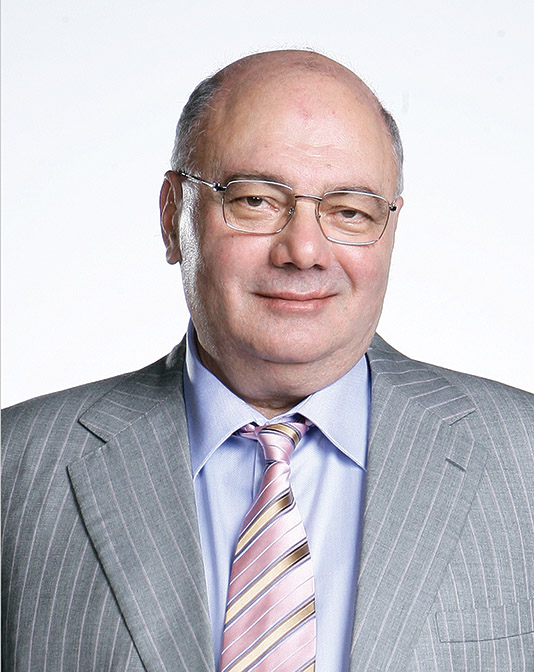
- Born: January 23, 1949; Yerevan, Armenian SSR, USSR
- Died: April 20, 2014 (aged 65); Yerevan, Armenia
- Education: National Polytechnic University of Armenia
- Occupations: businessman, philanthropist
- Spouse: Zina Muruzyan
- Children: Mikael Vardanyan, Karen Vardanyan

Hrant Vardanyan (Armenian: Հրանտ Վարդանյան, January 23, 1949 – April 20, 2014) was an Armenian businessman, the founder CEO of Grand Holding, and philanthropist. Honored Worker of Economy of the Republic of Armenia (2009).

== Biography ==
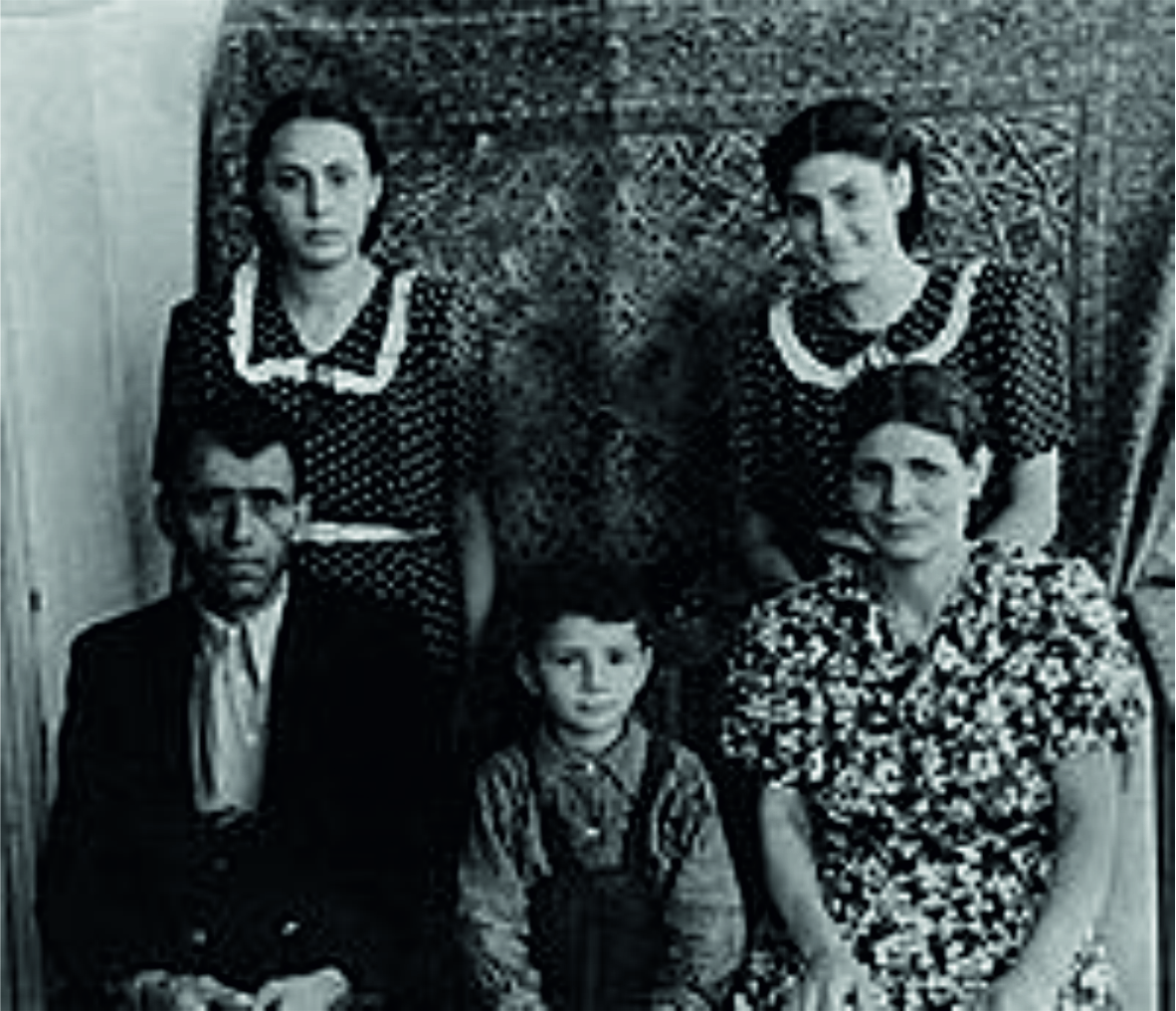
With parents and sisters, 1954

Hrant Vardanyan was born on 23 January 1949, in Yerevan, Armenia into a working-class family. From 1956 to 1966 he studied at the Kirov secondary school No. 12 in Yerevan, Armenia. From 1968 to 1974 he studied at the Yerevan Polytechnic Institute, Faculty of Machine Building and Mechanical Engineering, majoring in food-industry engineering. Since 1990 - Candidate of Economics. Non-party.

Thanks to Hrant Vardanyan, the celebration of the International Labor Day has been resumed in the Republic of Armenia as a state holiday since May 1, 2000. From 1998 to 2003, Hrant Vardanyan was the President of the Basketball Federation of Armenia, from 1992 to 2001 was the Board Member of the National Armenian Olympic Committee, from 2003 to 2014 was Member of the Board of Trustees of the Yerevan State Engineering University.

Hrant Vardanyan died on April 20, 2014. He is buried at Yerevan City Pantheon.

== Entrepreneurial activity ==
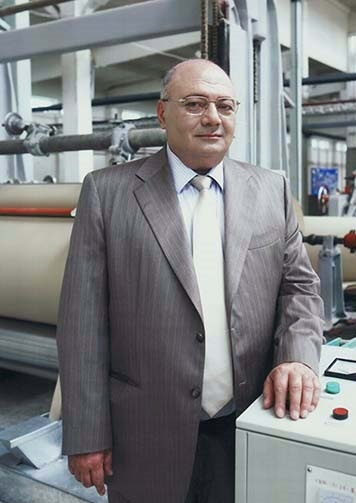
At the production

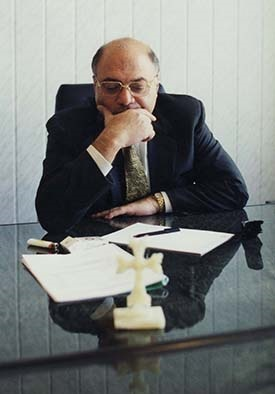
In the office

Hrant Vardanyan started his professional career at the Yerevan Experimental Tobacco Plant as an engineer technologist, and since 1984 has been the Deputy of General Director of the Plant. In 1996, he started his entrepreneurial activity, thus stimulating the restoration and development of domestic production.

Hrant Vardanyan founded Grand Tobacco, Grand Candy, International Masis Tabak and other companies. Grand Holding, established by him, is the first taxpayer, the leading exporter of finished products and the biggest employer in Armenia. Thanks to cooperation with this enterprise, thousands of working places have been created in agricultural sphere, particularly, in borderline villages of the Republic of Armenia.

=== Business philosophy ===
Since 1991, during the first 6 years after independence, when there was a mass unemployment, nearly nothing was manufactured in Armenia, and everything was imported, Hrant Vardanyan, as an entrepreneur, set himself the goal of reviving and developing of domestic manufacture. He was the first to believe that Armenia possesses the required intellectual, human and industrial potential to compete on the domestic and international markets. He became an example for other manufacturers and he proved that, in spite of mass unemployment, emigration and blockade, the Armenian nation is capable not only to work and produce high quality goods and to live with dignity but also to export its products and conquer multi-million markets all over the world.

=== Charity ===
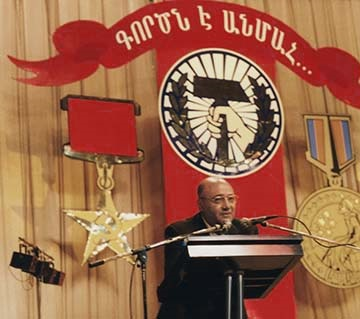
In the celebration of the International Labor Day

Hrant Vardanyan's charity activities were multipurpose and comprehensive: science, education, culture, healthcare, sports, etc. He sponsored the Yerevan Zoo, founded and financed the children's charity TV channel "Hayrenik", and for many years paid monthly pensions to all Heroes of Socialist Labor of Armenia.

Hrant Vardanyan implemented large scale, long-term charity projects in Tavush Province, especially in the borderline villages, thus promoting the development of the local communities.

Hrant Vardanyan built the St. Thaddeus Church in the town of Masis in Armenia.

== Personal life ==
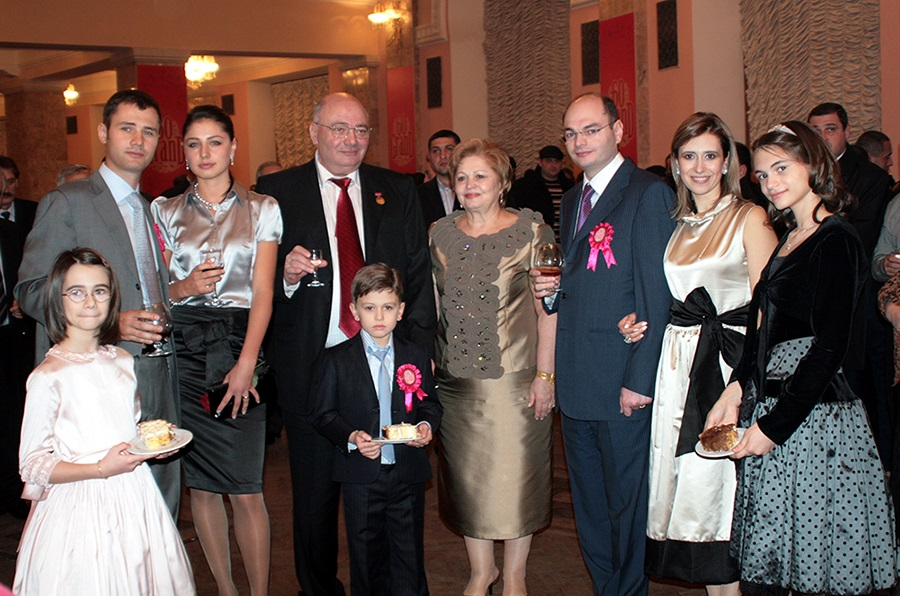
With family, 2009

Hrant Vardanyan was born in the family of Mikael Vardanyan and Shushanik Sargsyan. He has two sisters Rima and Rosa. His roots are from the village of Hinis, Western Armenia. Grandmother and grandfather were victims of the 1915 Armenian genocide. At the age of 7 Hrant Vardanyan lost his father.

He met his wife Zina Muruzyan while studying at the Polytechnic Institute and got married in 1972. Hrant Vardanyan has two sons Mikael and Karen, and six grandchildren: Isabella, Zina, Hrant, Daniel, Mark and Aksel.

== Awards ==
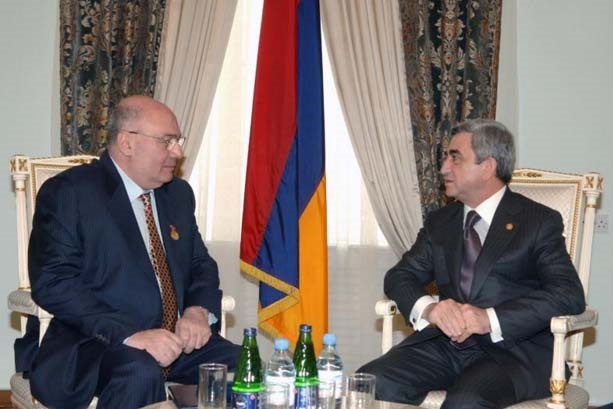
At the Residence of the President of Armenia, Serzh Sargsyan, during the awarding, 2009

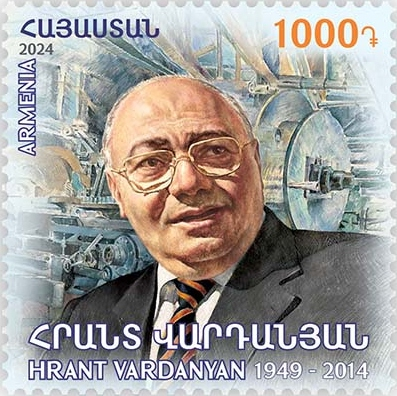
The stamp dedicated to the 75th anniversary of Hrant Vardanyan, the founder of Grand Holding, 2024

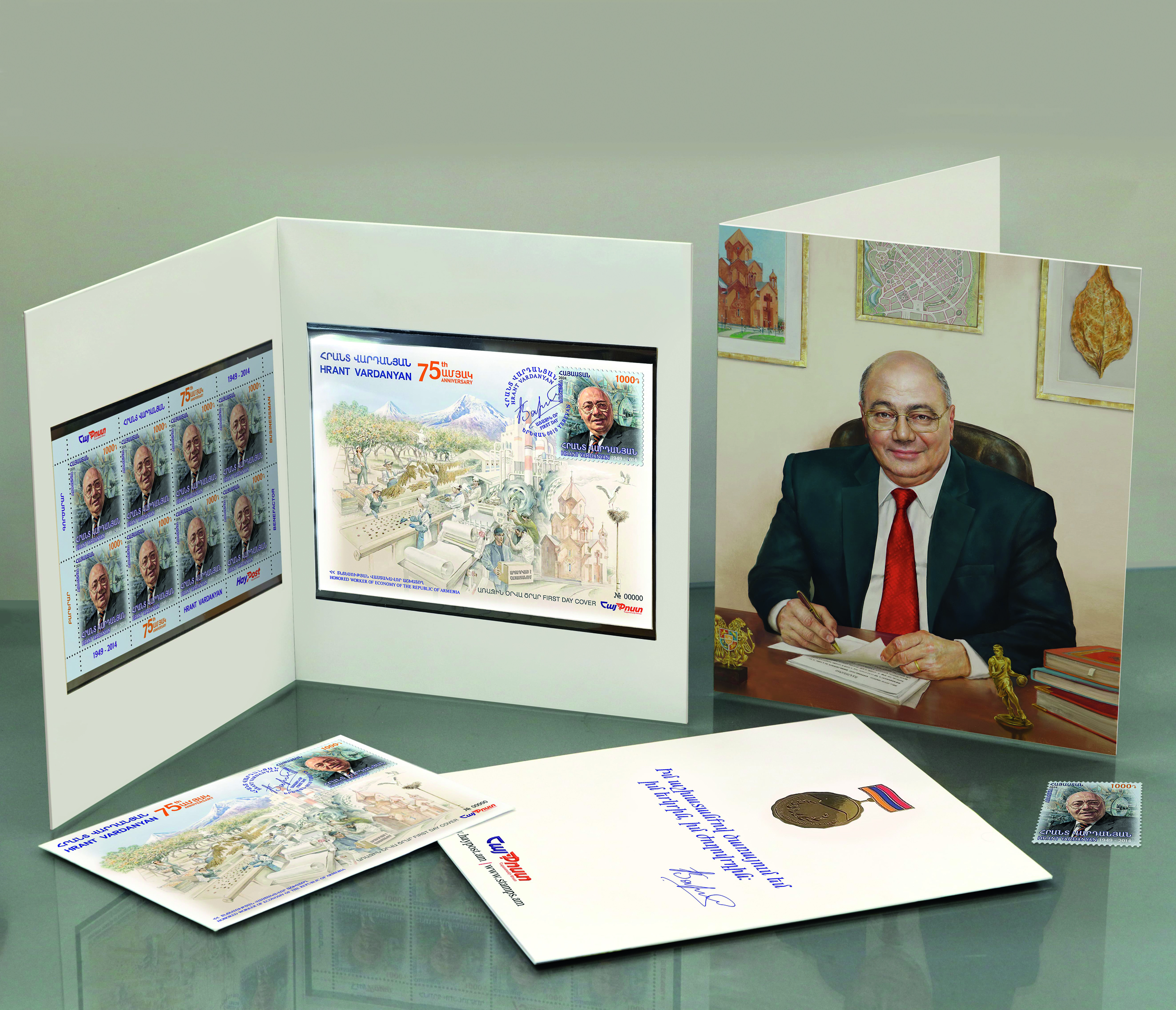
The stamp, the first day cover and the souvenir sheet dedicated to Hrant Vardanyan, 2024

- On October 22, 1999, the Medal of Anania Shirakatsi was awarded to Hrant Vardanyan by the President of Armenia for his contribution to the restoration of national production.
- On January 21, 2009, for the first time in the history of the independent Armenia, for his long-time and efficient business activities Hrant Vardanyan was awarded the title of Honored Worker of Economy of the Republic of Armenia by the President of Armenia.
- On December 19, 2014, the President of Armenia posthumously awarded Hrant Vardanyan the Order for Serving the Motherland, 1st Class for his personal contribution to the development of national economy.
- On February 5, 2019, Gortsaranayin Street in the town of Masis, Armenia, was renamed after Hrant Vardanyan.
- On June 22, 2021, Shahamiryanner Street in Yerevan's Shengavit administrative district, Armenia, was renamed after Hrant Vardanyan.
- On September 30, 2024, the stamp, the first day cover and the souvenir sheet dedicated to the 75th anniversary of Hrant Vardanyan, the founder of Grand Holding, were issued.
