= Vostanik Marukhyan =

Vostanik Marukhyan (Armenian: Ոստանիկ Մարուխյան; born March 4, 1946) in Yerevan, Armenia was a Rector of State Engineering University of Armenia from 2006 to 2011, t.s.c. professor, full member of Engineering Academy, member of the National Assembly of Armenia (from 2003 to 2007), chairman of "Thermal Power Engineering and Protection of Environment" of department Power Engineering of SEUA.

== Biography ==
=== Education ===
Vostanik Marukhyan finished Yerevan N2 secondary school after Hk. Abovyan in 1964. From 1964 to 1969 studied in the faculty of Electrical Engineering of Yerevan Polytechnic Institute after K. Marx by the profession "Thermal Power Plants". From 1971 to 1974 he studied in post graduate course of Yerevan Polytechnic Institute. From 1969 to 1975 worked in chair of Thermal Power Engineering of faculty of Power Engineering of Yerevan Polytechnic Institute as an Assistant, and before 1983 worked as Senior Lecture in the same chair. From 1983 to 1997 as an associate Professor of chair, and from 1997 till now as a Professor of chair of Thermal Power Engineering of department of Power Engineering of SEUA. From 1978 to 1979 passed academic and scientific study courses in Technical University and Power Economy Institute of Budapest. From 1996 to 2001 participated academic and scientific trainings in Technical University of Athens, Nuclear Technology Research Institute of Paris and in Lund University.

=== Work experience ===
From 1983 to 1987 Vostanik Marukhyan worked as a deputy Dean in the Faculty of Power Engineering of Yerevan Polytechnic Institute and from 1987 to 1990 as a Dean in the Faculty of Power Engineering. From April 1990 till December 1990 occupied the positions of the Head of Academic department of SEUA, from 1990 to 1992 Pro-Rector of the Head of Academic department of SEUA, from 1992 to 1993 Vice-Rector of Academic work of SEUA, from 1993 to 1999 Vice-President of Academic work of SEUA, from 1999 to 2003 Pro-Rector of Head of Academic of SEUA. He had an active involvement in the realization process of educational reforms in SEUA, under his direct management and participation for the first time were elaborated and successfully used both the bachelor and junior specialist educational programmes. Since February 1999 till June has been the first deputy of the Ministry of Education and Science of RA. He is co-author of several statues and measured documents which had an importance for RA high educational field. At the same time he is the author of 11 educational manuals and text-books. Since 1991 is the member of Armenian Revolutionary Federation. In May 2003 during the Parliamentary elections of RA by the proportional list of ARF was elected as the deputy of the Parliament of RA. He has been the member of Parliamentary state and legal questions permanent commission and the member of temporary commission for integration to European structures. During his 3-year activity in the Parliament has been a co-author of 22 legislative initiatives, the member of work group involved in the process of elaboration of RA Constitutional reforms project and co-reporter of its presentation during the full session of the Parliament. He has been the leader of Armenia-Greece and Armenia-Italy Parliamentary friendship groups. In October 2002 was awarded with silver medal of RA Engineering Academy. In January 2003 was elected as a full member of RA Engineering Academy. He is the author of 108 scientific academic and public articles. The field of his scientific researches include the optimalization of modern "Thermo-Electro-Plants" and "Atom-Electro-Plants" work regime and the ecological basic problems. In social order runs the position of the president of experimental committee of Technical Council of the Ministry of the Power Engineering of RA, he is the member of Scientific Council of Power Engineering of SNA of RA and both SNA of RA and publishing colleague information magazine of SEUA. He also runs the chairs of Thermal Power Engineering and Environmental protections of SEUA. In 2006 he was awarded with the golden medal of SEUA. From June 2006 until September 2011 he was rector of SEUA.

=== Family ===
He is married; his wife Emilia Minasyan is an Engineer-Power Engineer by profession, works as an advanced specialist. His son Karen Marukhyan graduated from the faculty of Power Engineering, SEUA, getting two years' education of Master's, Postgraduate, and has the qualification of a researcher. This year he is going to defend a Candidate’s dissertation. He works in Armenian-American Synopsys corporation. His daughter Tatevik Marukhyan graduated from the faculty of Power Engineering, SEUA, and conferred the qualification of Economist-Engineer. She holds a master's degree from the London School of Economics.
