= Siranush Atoyan =

Soviet Armenia architect (1904–1985)

- Սիրանուշ Աթոյան
- Born: 1904; Akhaltsikhe
- Died: 1985 (aged 80–81); Yerevan, Armenian SSR, USSR
- Education: National Polytechnic University of Armenia
- Occupation: Architect
- Notable work: Kanaker Hydroelectric Power Station

Siranush Yakovlevna Atoyan (1904–1985; Armenian: Սիրանուշ Աթոյան) was a Soviet Armenian architect.

== Biography ==
Atoyan attended National Polytechnic University of Armenia (formerly Yerevan Polytechnic Institute), and graduated in 1931.

Starting in 1932, she was a member of the Armenian Union of Architects. From 1952 to 1971, Atoyan served as senior specialist of the Armenian State Project (Armenian: Հայպետնախագիծ, romanized: Haypetnakhagits), a regional urban planning organization founded and operated by the Armenian SSR.

== Works ==
- Dwelling houses in the workers' settlements, Dzoraget, Lori Province
  - House of the paramilitary guards of Dzoraget
- Kanaker Hydroelectric Power Station, part of Sevan–Hrazdan Cascade, Kanaker, Kanaker-Zeytun, Yerevan, Armenia
  - Dwelling houses in the workers' settlements, Kanaker-Zeytun District, Yerevan
  - Kanaker GES club in Yerevan
- Arzni mineral water plant, Arzni, Kotayk Province, Armenia
  - Kindergarten-nursery, Arzni mineral water plant
  - Repair and mechanical workshop, Arzni mineral water plant
- Sugar sale warehouses in Yerevan
- "Pišchevik" company stadium in Yerevan

== See also ==
- Armenian architecture
