= National Polytechnic University of Armenia =

Public university in Yerevan, Armenia

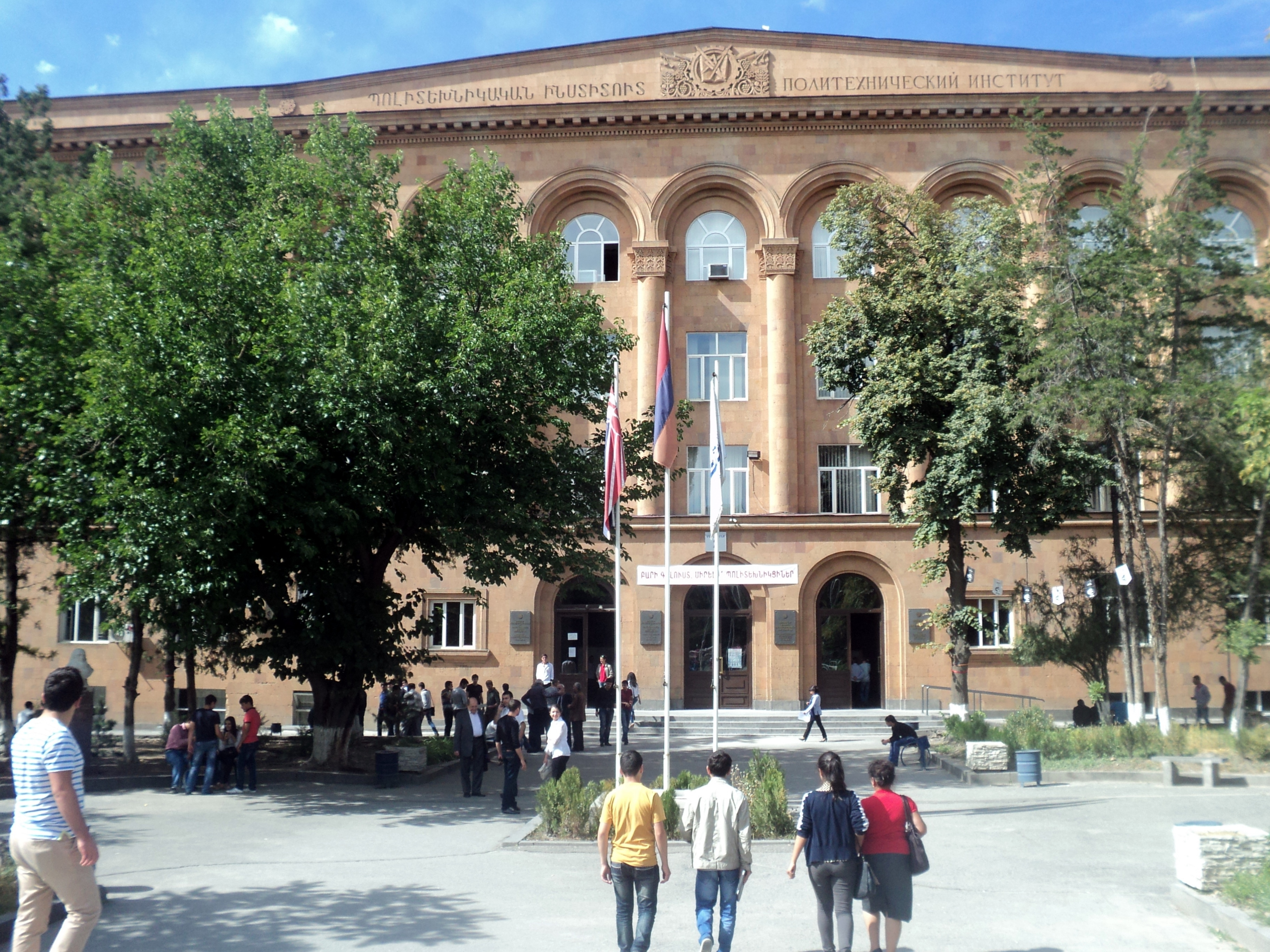
- Former names: Yerevan Karl Marx Polytechnic Institute, Yerevan Polytechnic Institute, State Engineering University of Armenia
- Type: Public
- Established: 1933; 93 years ago
- Rector: Gor Vardanyan
- Academic staff: 17
- Students: about 10,000
- Location: Yerevan, Armenia; 40°11′27.99″N 44°31′23.19″E
- Campus: Yerevan, Gyumri, Vanadzor, Kapan
- Colors: Blue, White
- Website: polytech.am

The National Polytechnic University of Armenia (Armenian: Հայաստանի ազգային պոլիտեխնիկական համալսարան) is a technical university located in Yerevan, Armenia. Established as the Karl Marx Institute of Polytechnic in 1933, it provides educational and research programs in various fields of technology and science related to engineering. The university includes a central campus in Yerevan and branch campuses located in Gyumri, Vanadzor and Kapan. Currently there are more than 8,000 students and more than 750 faculty members.

== History ==
The university was founded by the Soviet government in 1933 as the Karl Marx Institute of Polytechnic including 2 faculties with 107 students. With the development of the industrial sector in the Armenian SSR, the university gradually grew. By the 1980s, the university had around 25,000 students.

With the independence of Armenia in 1991, the university name was changed to the State Engineering University of Armenia. In November 2014, the university was renamed as the National Polytechnic University of Armenia by the decision of the government of Armenia.

== Campuses ==
As of 2016, the university has campuses in 3 Armenian cities other than Yerevan:

- Gyumri
- Vanadzor
- Kapan

== Faculties and Institutes ==
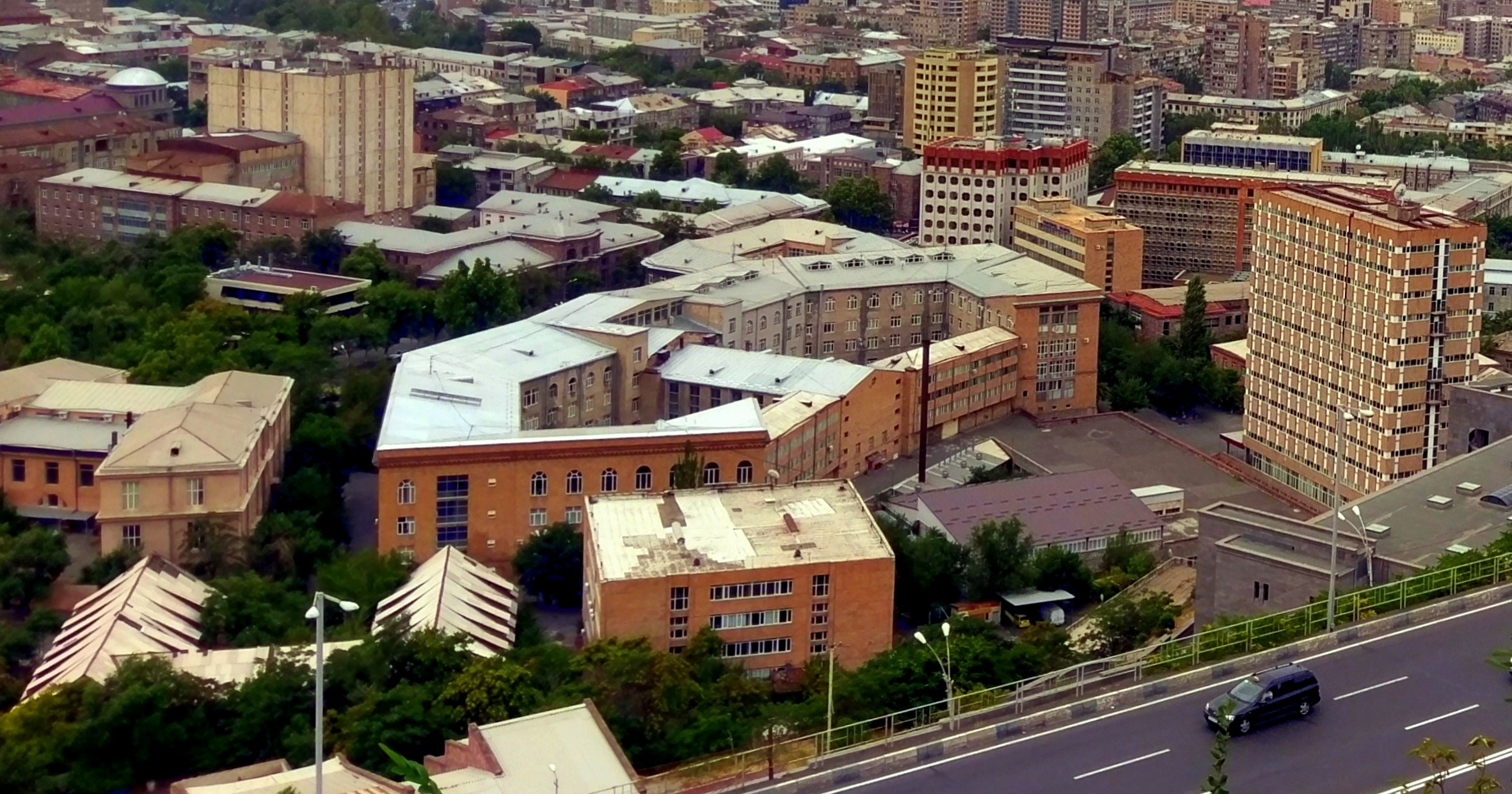
General view of the university premises in Yerevan

As of 2016, the university has the following faculties:

- Yerevan:
  - Faculty of Chemical Technologies and Environmental Engineering
  - Faculty of Applied Mathematics and Physics
  - Faculty of Mining and Metallurgy
  - Institute of Energetics and Electrotechnic
  - Institute of Mechanical Engineering and Transportation Systems Design
  - Institute of Information and Communication Technologies and Electronics

The university has a faculty that provides online studies as well.

- Gyumri campus:
  - Faculty of Technologies and sectoral economics
  - Faculty of Natural sciences and communication systems

The Gyumri campus provides online studies as well.

- Vanadzor campus named after Petros Melkonyan:
  - Faculty of Technologies and sectoral economics
  - Faculty of Natural sciences and communication systems

The Vanadzor campus provides online studies as well.

- Kapan campus:
  - Faculty of Technologies and sectoral economics
  - Faculty of Natural sciences and communication systems

== International relations ==
As of 2016, the National Polytechnic University of Armenia has international cooperation with the following universities and institutions:

1. China
  - Jilin University
  - Shanghai Institute of Electric Power
  - Huazhong University of Science and Technology
2. Finland
  - Central Ostrobothnia Polytechnic
3. France
  - Ecole Supérieure d’Ingénieurs de Marseille (ESIM)
  - Paris 12 Val de Marne University
  - Aix-Marseille University
  - University of the Mediterranean
  - Université de Droit, d’Economie et des Sciences
  - Chamber of commerce (Marseille)
4. Germany
  - Technische Universität Ilmenau
  - Institute of Optoelectronics (Wesling)
  - Technische Universität Darmstadt and Stuttgart
5. Greece
  - Aristotle University of Thessaloniki
  - National Technical University of Athens
  - Technological Educational Institute of Piraeus
6. Italy
  - Sapienza University of Rome
  - University of Rome Tor Vergata
7. Portugal
  - Technical University of Lisbon
8. Russia
  - Moscow Institute of Energetics
  - Bauman Moscow State Technical University
  - Moscow Technical University of Communication and Informatics
9. Spain
  - University of Granada
  - Autonomous University of Barcelona
  - University of Alicante
10. Sweden
  - Royal Institute of Technology (Stockholm)
  - Lund University
11. Syria
  - Damascus University
12. Ukraine
  - Igor Sikorsky Kyiv Polytechnic Institute
  - Ukrainian State Academy of Light Industry (Kyiv)
13. United Kingdom
  - Brunel University London
  - Queen's University Belfast
  - University of Huddersfield
14. United States
  - California State Polytechnic University, Pomona
  - New Jersey Institute of Technology
  - Indiana University – Purdue University Indianapolis
  - Southern University
  - Grambling State University and Southern University New Orleans (Louisiana)

== Rectors ==
- Hovhannes Babajanyan, 1934–1936
- Hmayak Ghondakhchyan, 1936–1937
- Ashot Melikjanyan, 1937
- Misak Petrosyan, 1937–1946
- Petros Melkonyan, 1946–1965
- Ashot Aslanyan, 1965–1966
- Artsrun Gasparyan, 1966–1980
- Rafayel Movsisyan, 1980–1988
- Yuri Sargsyan, 1988–2006
- Vostanik Marukhyan, 2006–2011
- Ara Avetisyan, 2011–2014
- Hovhannes Tokmajyan, 2014–2015
- Vostanik Marukhyan, 2015–2020
- Gor Vardanyan, 2021–present

== Notable alumni ==
- Siranush Atoyan (1904–1985), Soviet Armenian architect
- Karen Demirchyan (1932–1999), former speaker of the National Assembly of Armenia
- Gevorg Emin (1919–1998), Armenian poet and writer.
- Robert Kocharyan (born 1954), former president of Armenia.
- Andranik Margaryan (2000–2007), former prime minister of Armenia.
- Levon Mnatsakanyan, former defense minister of the Nagorno Karabakh Republic
- Lili Morto, singer, actress, and model
- Vartan Oskanian, former Minister of Foreign Affairs of Armenia.
- Aram Sargsyan, 9th prime minister of Armenia
- Tigran Torosyan, former speaker of the National Assembly of Armenia.
- Edmund Tsaturyan, member of the National Assembly of Armenia
- Tamar Tumanyan (1907–1989) Soviet Armenian architect
- Hrant Vardanyan, Armenian businessman

== Milestones ==
- 1933 February 27 - According to the Resolution of the Government of Soviet Armenia, the two Yerevan Institutes of Civil Engineering and Chemical Technology were merged and 1933.
- 1933 March 1 - Yerevan Polytechnic Institute (YPI) was established with two faculties: Faculty of Civil Engineering and Faculty of Chemical Technology.
- 1933 March 14 - In commemoration of 50 years after Karl Marx's death, the institute was renamed to Yerevan Karl Marx Polytechnic Institute.
- 1939 - Industrial Correspondence Education Institute joined YPI, becoming its Department of Correspondence Education.
- 1942 September 1 - The faculty of Electrical Engineering was founded.
- 1944 September 1 - The faculty of Mechanical Engineering was founded.
- 1946 Autumn - The first Students’ Scientific Conference of the institute took place.
- 1947 - The Students' Scientific Association of YPI was established.
- 1953 - The Faculty of Mining was founded.
- 1956 - The library reading hall of YPI with 45 thousand books was opened.
- 1957 May 1 - The first issue of the newspaper §Polytechnic¦ was published.
- 1959 - Leninakan (Gyumri) and Kirovakan (Vanadzor) Branches of YPI were founded.
- 1961 - The Faculty of Automatics and Computing Technics was founded.
- 1964 - The chamber music band of YPI was created.
- 1966 - The Faculty of Automatics and Computing Technics was renamed into the Faculty of Technical Cybernetics.
- 1972 - The Faculty of Radioelectronics was separated from the Faculty of Technical Cybernetics.
- 1972 - The Faculty of Power Engineering was founded.
- 1972 - The Branch of the Faculty of Radio-electronics was founded in Dilijan.
- 1974 - The Faculty of Social Specialities was established.
- 1978 - The Faculty of Computing Technics was founded based on the faculties of Technical Cybernetics and Radio Engineering.
- 1978 - The Faculty of Radioelectronics was renamed into the Faculty of Radio Engineering.
- 1985 - The Faculty of Transportation was organized with the units separated from the faculties of Machine Building and Mechanical Engineering.
- 1991 - The Stepanakert Branch of YPI was founded in Artsakh. Later in 1993, on its base the Artsakh University was established.
- 1991 November 29 - By the Order No 4 of the RA President, YPI was reorganized into State Engineering University of Armenia (SEUA).
- 1991 December 9 - The Resolution No 670 of the RA Government on the establishment of SEUA was adopted, which approved the guidelines of reformations in accordance with the SEUA Master Plan.
- 1992 - The Department of Mathematics was founded by the merger of three Mathematics chairs.
- 1992 - The Department of Social and Political Disciplines was founded, reorganized in 1994 into the Department of Social-Political Disciplines and General Economics.
- 1994 - The Department of Mechanics and Machine Science was created.
- 1994 - The Alumni Association and the Student Council of SEUA were established.
- 1996 - SEUA became a member of the Association of European Universities (AEU).
- 2001 June - The SEUA Interdepartmental Chair of Microelectronic Circuits and Systems was established based on the Armenian Branch of Leda Systems Co.
- 2001 July - The Student Career Service Center was founded.
- 2003 October - The 70th anniversary of establishing YPI-SEUA was celebrated. The president and the prime minister of RA participated in the celebration ceremonies.
- 2004 September - The university's historical classroom No 1301 was overhauled and now it serves as an assembly hall for Academic Council sittings and other solemn events.
- 2005 September - By the resolution of RA Government the traditional name "Polytechnic" was returned to the university as an acronym.
- 2005 December - The first session of the SEUA new Council was convened, and president of NAS RA Fadey Sargsyan was elected as a chairman of the council.
- 2006 May - The SEUA Alumni Union reorganized into Alumni Association, and the prime minister of RA A.Margaryan was elected as a president of the association.

== See also ==
- American University of Armenia
- Armenian State Institute of Physical Culture
- Armenian State Pedagogical University
- Eurasia International University
- Russian-Armenian (Slavonic) University
- Yerevan State University
- Yerevan State Linguistic University
- Yerevan State Medical University
- Yerevan State Musical Conservatory
