= Edmund Tsaturyan =

Armenian politician

Member of the National Assembly of Armenia
- In office 1999–2003

Personal details
- Born: 18 March 1937 Yerevan, Armenian SSR, Soviet Union
- Died: 14 May 2010 (aged 73) Yerevan, Armenia
- Party: People's Party of Armenia
- Education: National Polytechnic University of Armenia

Edmund Tsaturyan (18 March 1937 – 14 May 2010) was an Armenian politician. He attended the National Polytechnic University of Armenia. Tsaturyan served as a People's Party of Armenia member of the National Assembly of Armenia from 1999 to 2003.

Tsaturyan died on 14 May 2010 in Yerevan, at the age of 73.
