= Saint Thaddeus Church, Masis =

Armenian Apostolic church in Masis, Armenia

The St. Thaddeus Church
- Սուրբ Թադեոս եկեղեցի
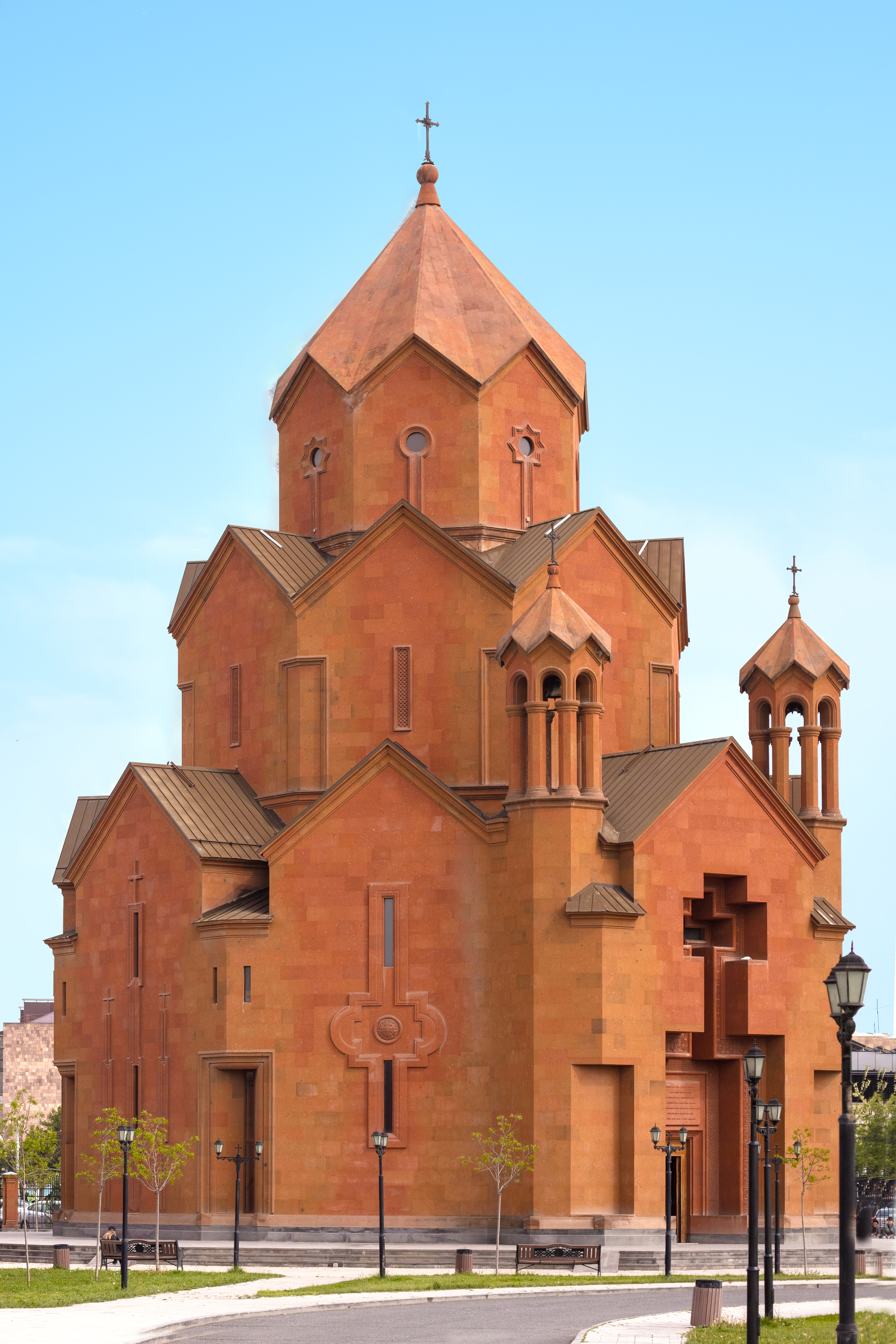

- Location within Armenia

Religion
- Affiliation: Armenian Apostolic Church
- Year consecrated: 2015
- Status: Active

Location
- Location: Masis, Armenia; Ararat Province
- Administration: Diocese of Masyatsotn

Architecture
- Architects: Arthur Tarkhanyan and Anahit Tarkhanyan

The Saint Thaddeus Church (Armenian: Սուրբ Թադեոս Եկեղեցի), is an Armenian Apostolic church in the town of Masis, Ararat Province, Armenia.

== History ==
The construction site of the Church was chosen by Vazgen I, the Catholicos of All Armenians, in 1991 and the ground blessing service was conducted in the same year. The construction started in 2003 by the initiative and funding of philanthropist Hrant Vardanyan. In 2015, the construction of the Church was completed by his sons, Mikayel and Karen Vardanyans.

The Church, built with the blessing of Vazgen I, the Catholicos of All Armenians, was named after the Apostle St. Thaddeus. On October 4, 2015, the Catholicos of All Armenians Karekin II, consecrated the Saint Thaddeus Church.

The hall for candle lighting is located at the entrance of the Church. A memorial fountain dedicated to Hrant Vardanyan, is installed in the yard of the Church.

On April 24, 2016, by the initiative of philanthropists Mikayel and Karen Vardanyans, a khachkar was placed in the yard of the Church, in honor of the 1,5 million canonized martyrs of the Armenian Genocide. The khachkar was carved of a whole tuff stone by Artak Hambardzumyan.

In 2021, with the blessing of Garegin II, Catholicos of all Armenians, Diocese of Masyatsotn was founded in Ararat region, and the Saint Thaddeus Church was chosen as the chancery.

In 2025, on the initiative of Mikael and Karen Vardanyan, the second floor of the chancery of Diocese of Masyatsotn was built. The church candle-lighting hall, where 12 icons are installed, was completely reconstructed and expanded.

== Architecture ==
The architects of St. Thaddeus Church are Artur and Anahit Tarkhanyans. It is a combination of Armenian church building traditions, and contemporary architectural and construction solutions. The church is triple-stepped, and differs by its design and spatial solutions. The internal space is shaped by two intersecting squares, which symbolize eternity and purity of faith, and through the latter the whole structural system is constructed.

The dome is rested on semi crossing arches. The external and internal cladding of the Church is unique. The colors from the center to the edges become lighter, and from the base to the dome – darker. The height of the temple, without the cross on the dome, is 33 meters, which symbolizes the years of Jesus Christ’s life on earth. Thirty-three biblical commandments are engraved on the entire wall surrounding the Church.

== Gallery ==
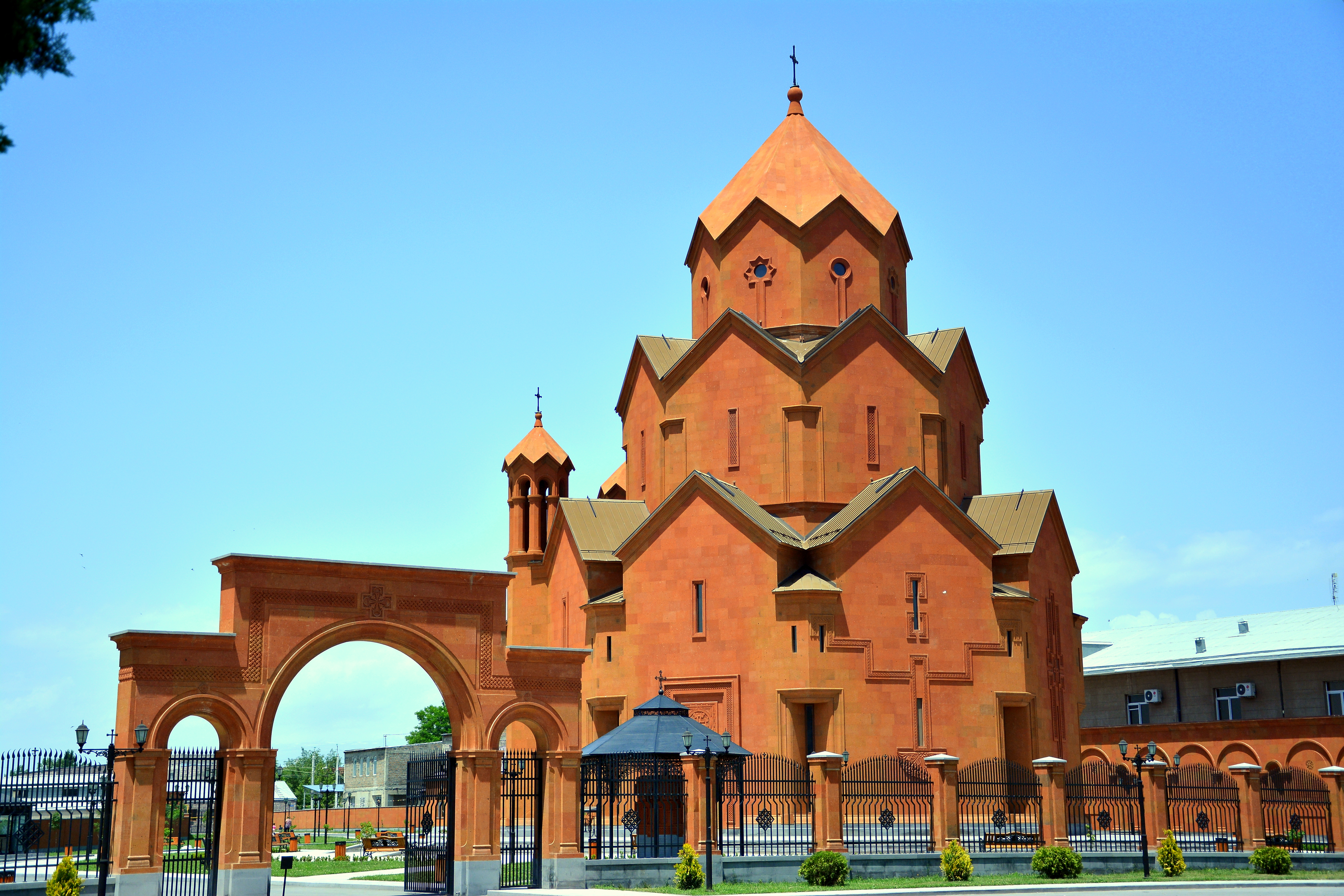
The main entrance to the Church

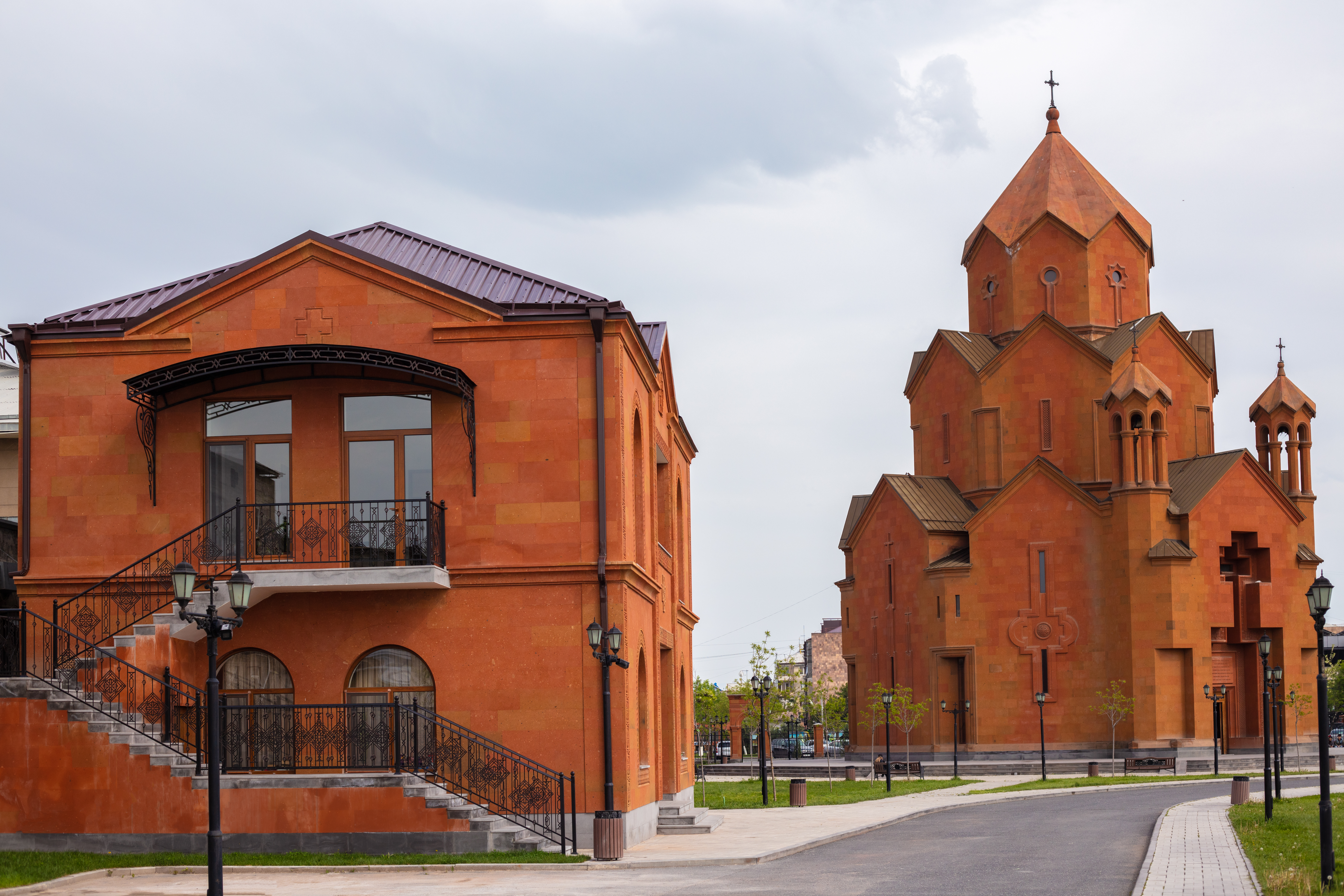
The Church and the building of the chancery

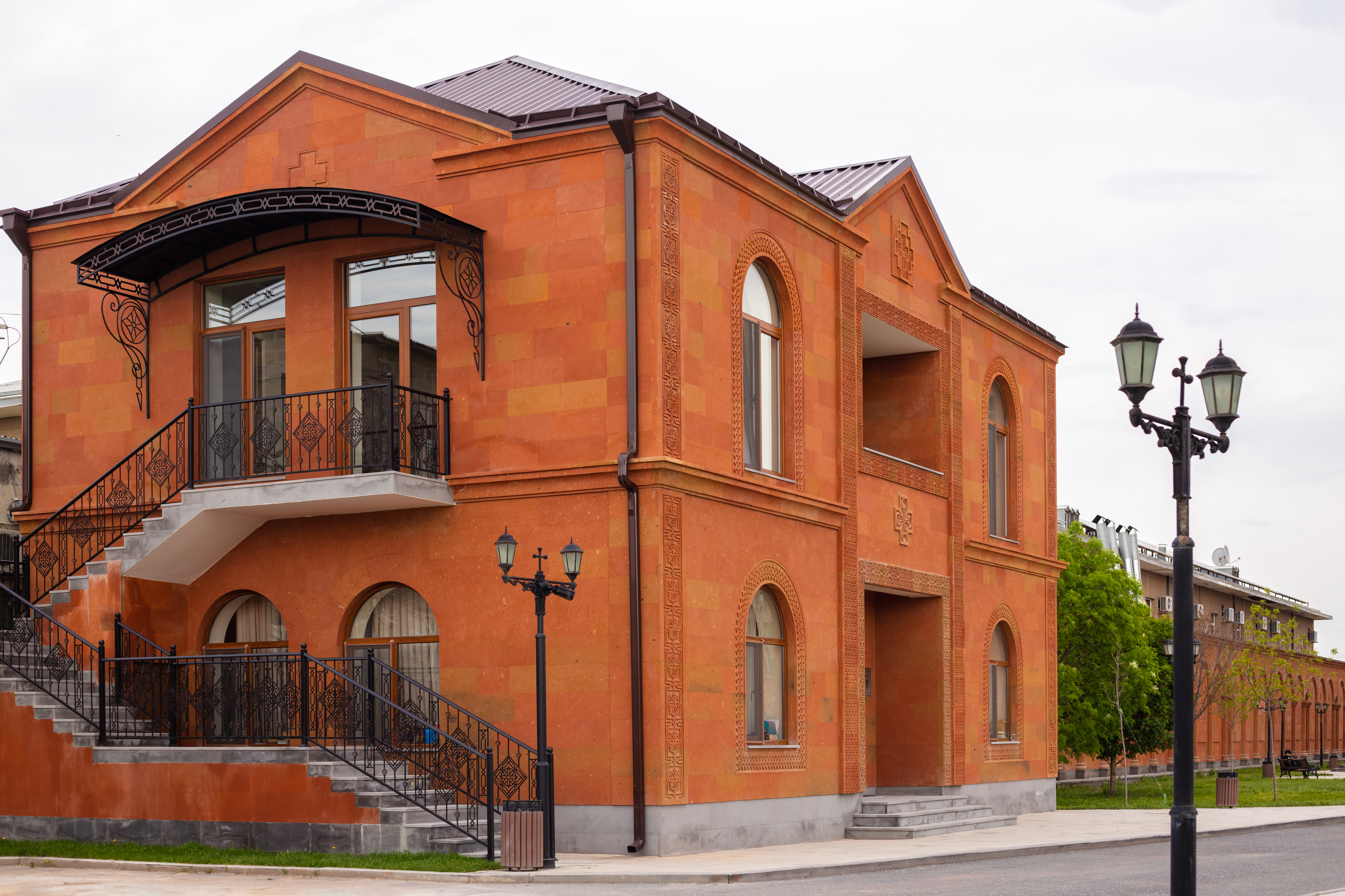
The building of the chancery

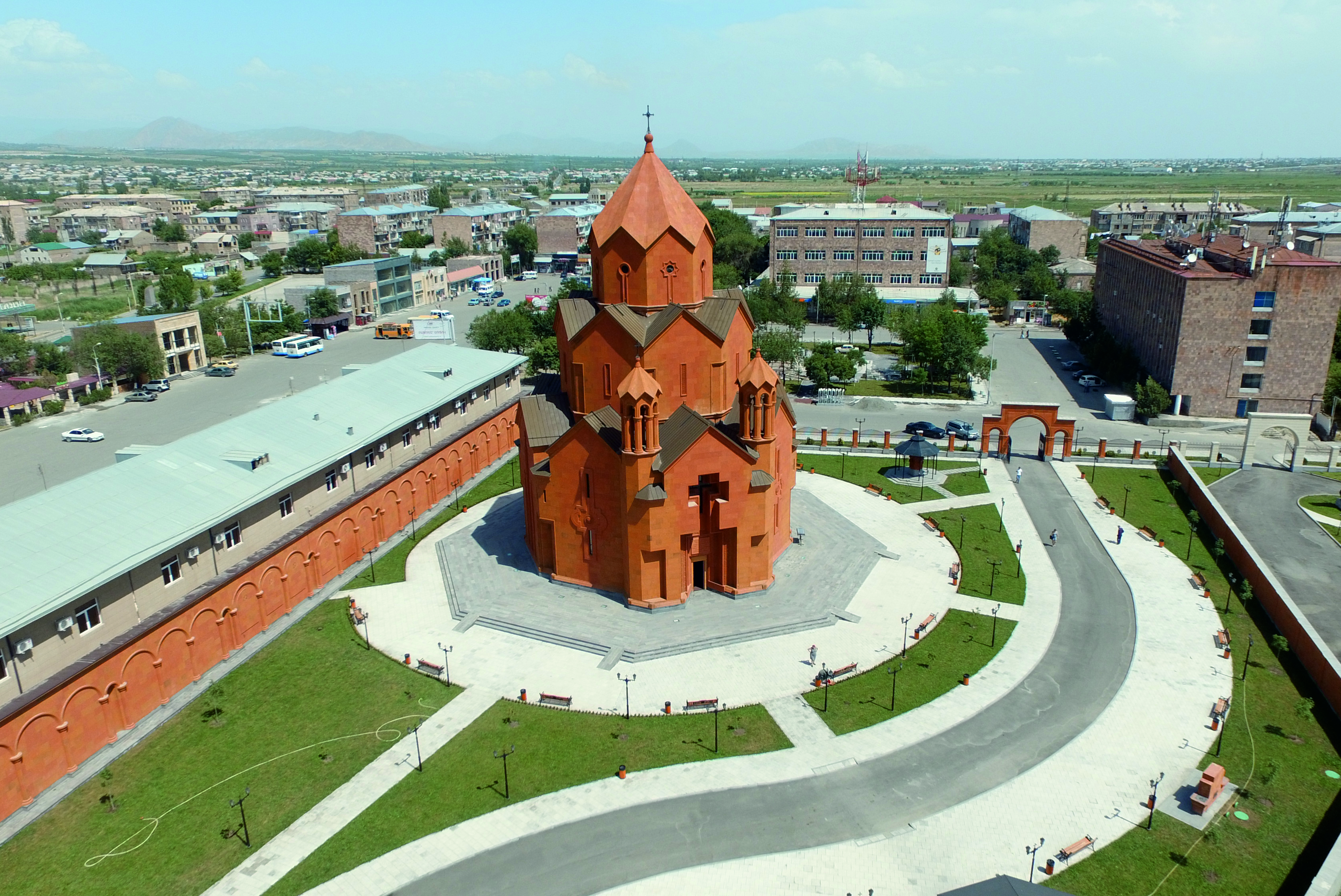
View of the Church from the West

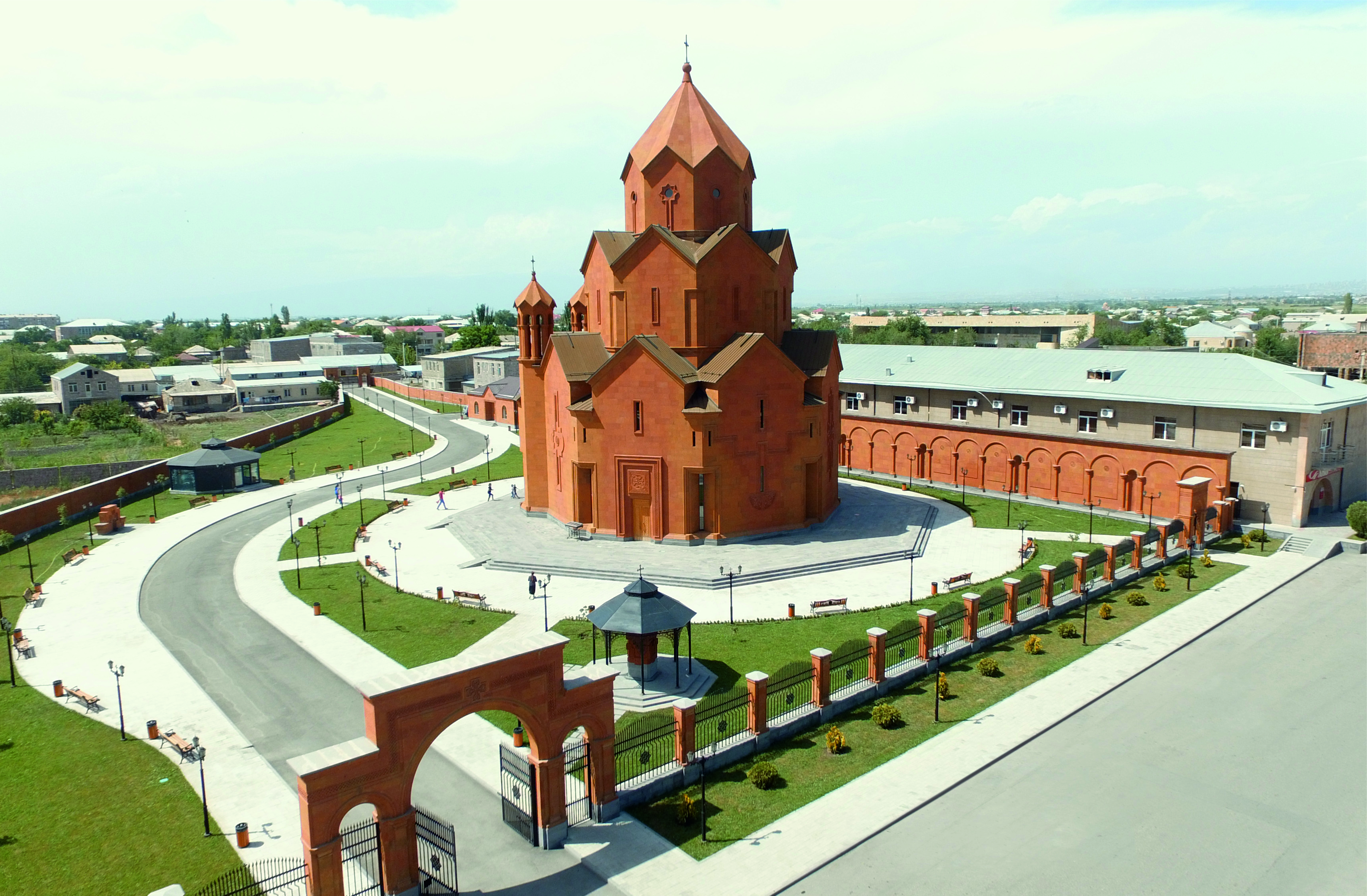
View of the Church from the East

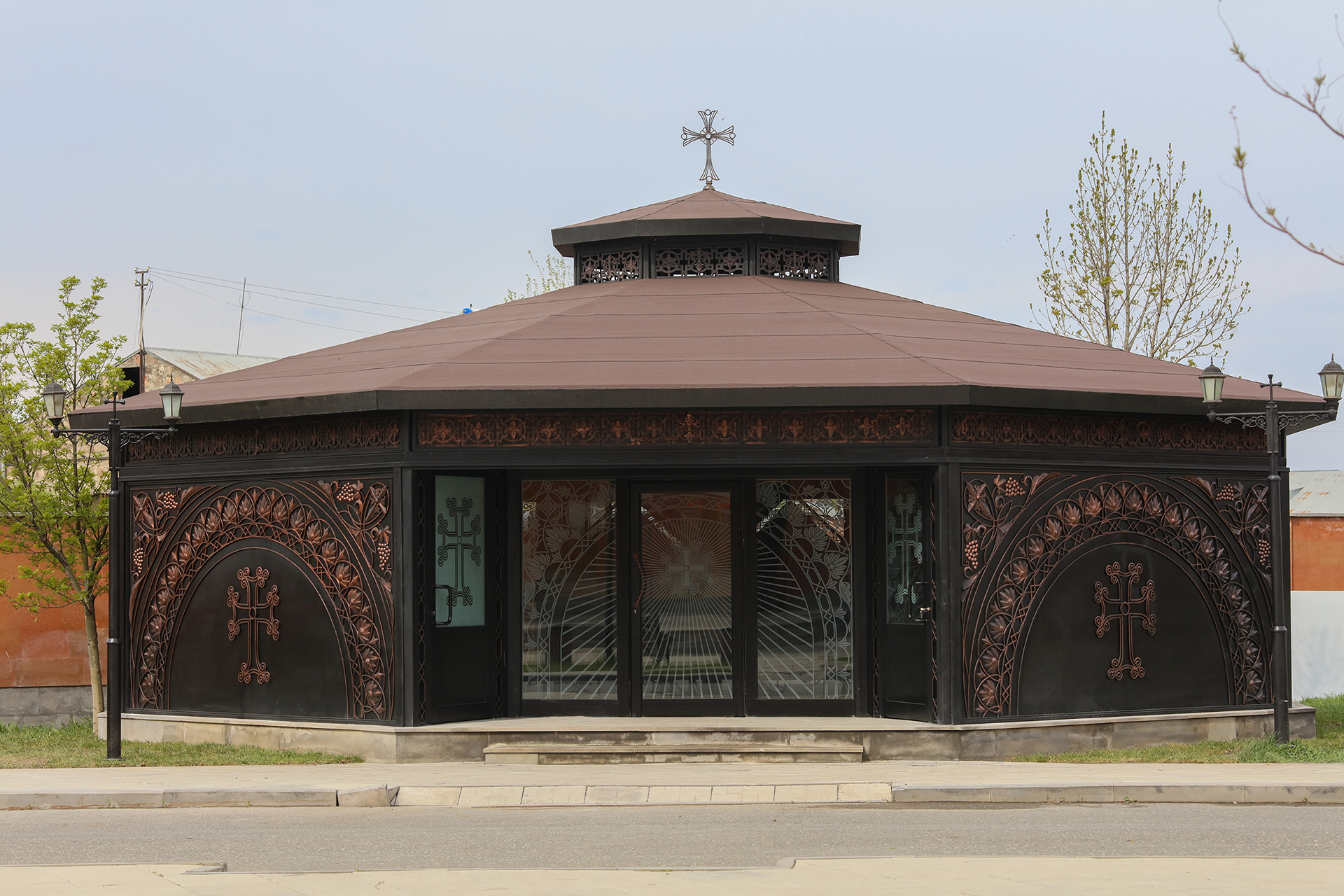
Hall for candle lighting

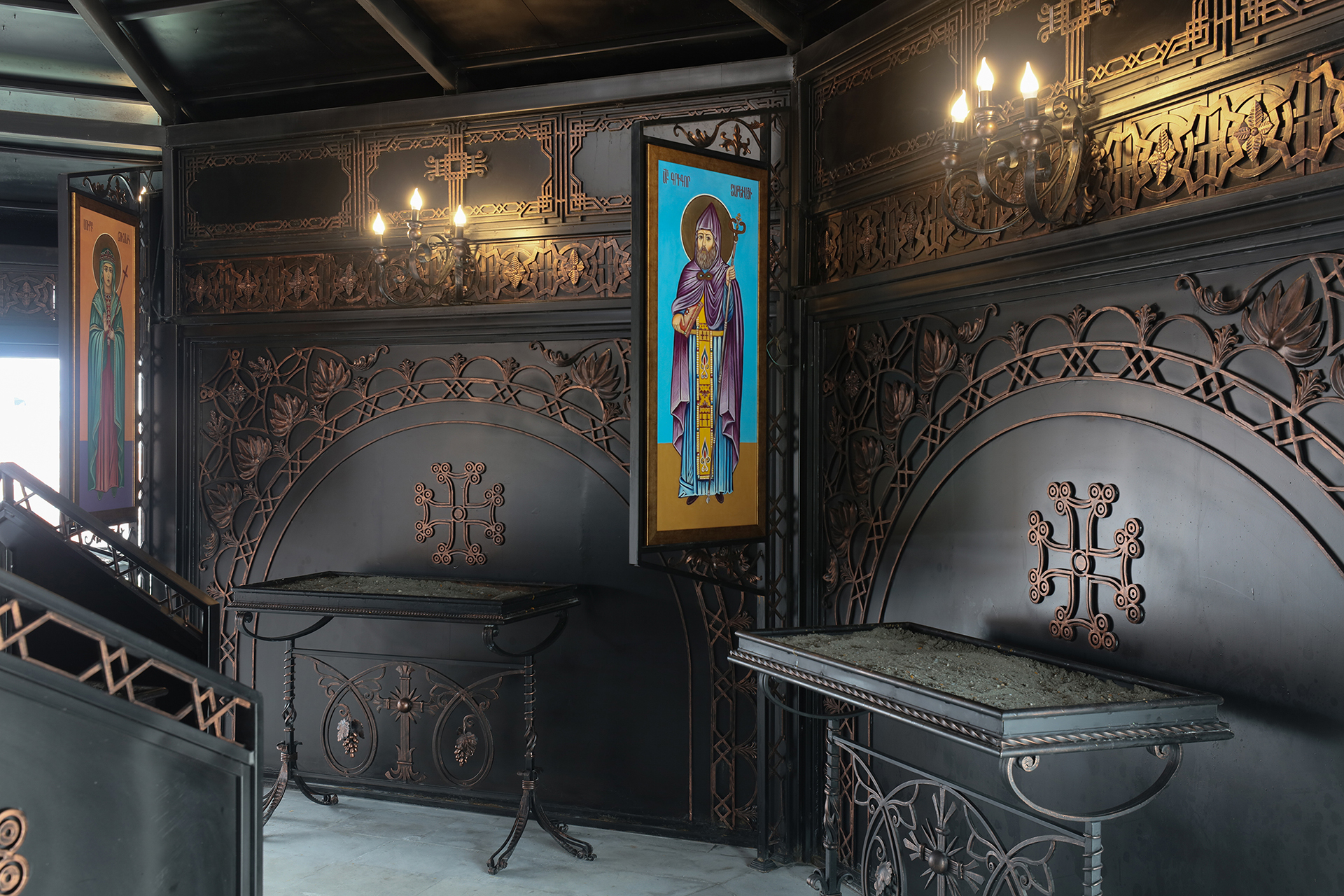
Interior view of the candle-lighting hall

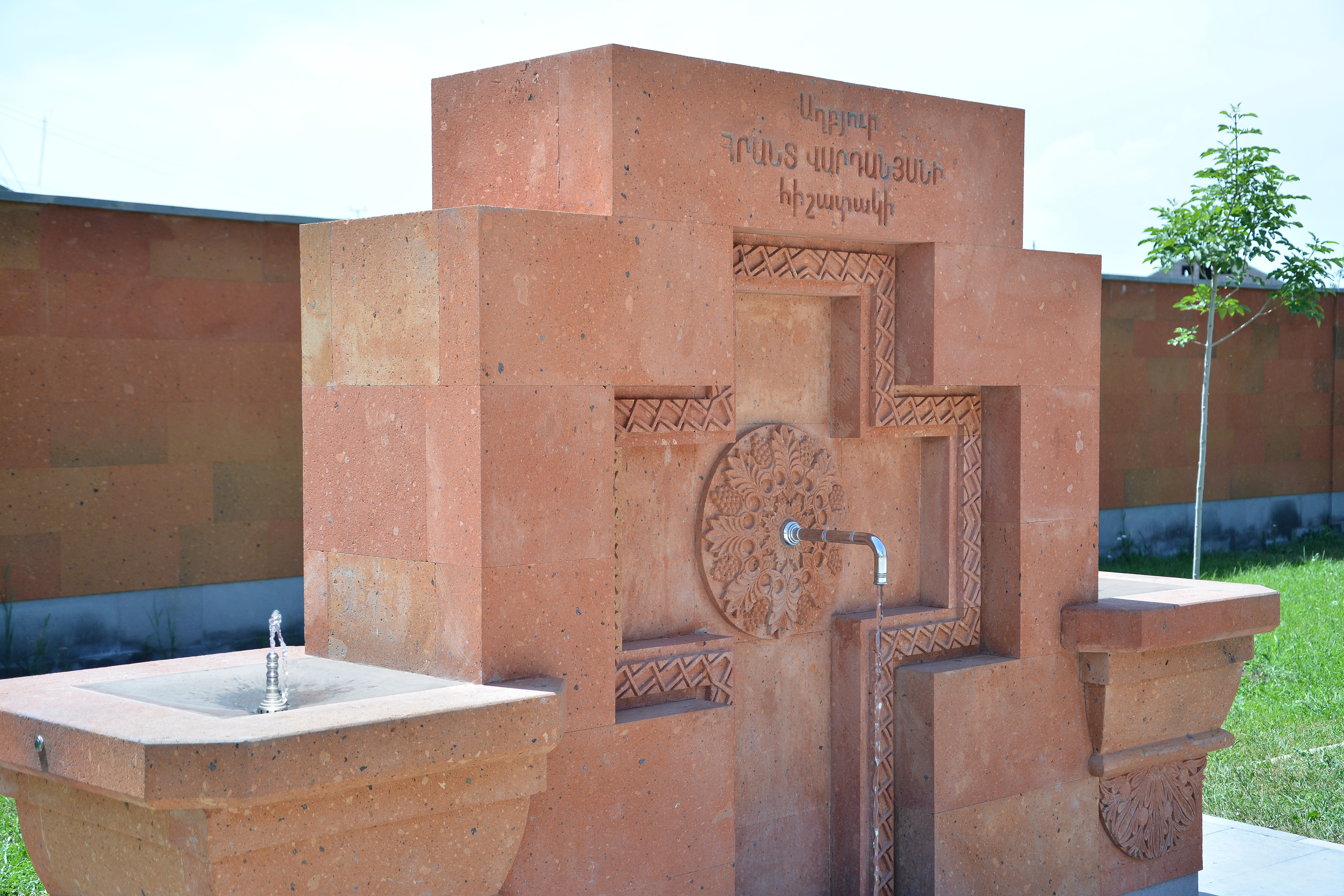
Memorial fountain dedicated to Hrant Vardanyan

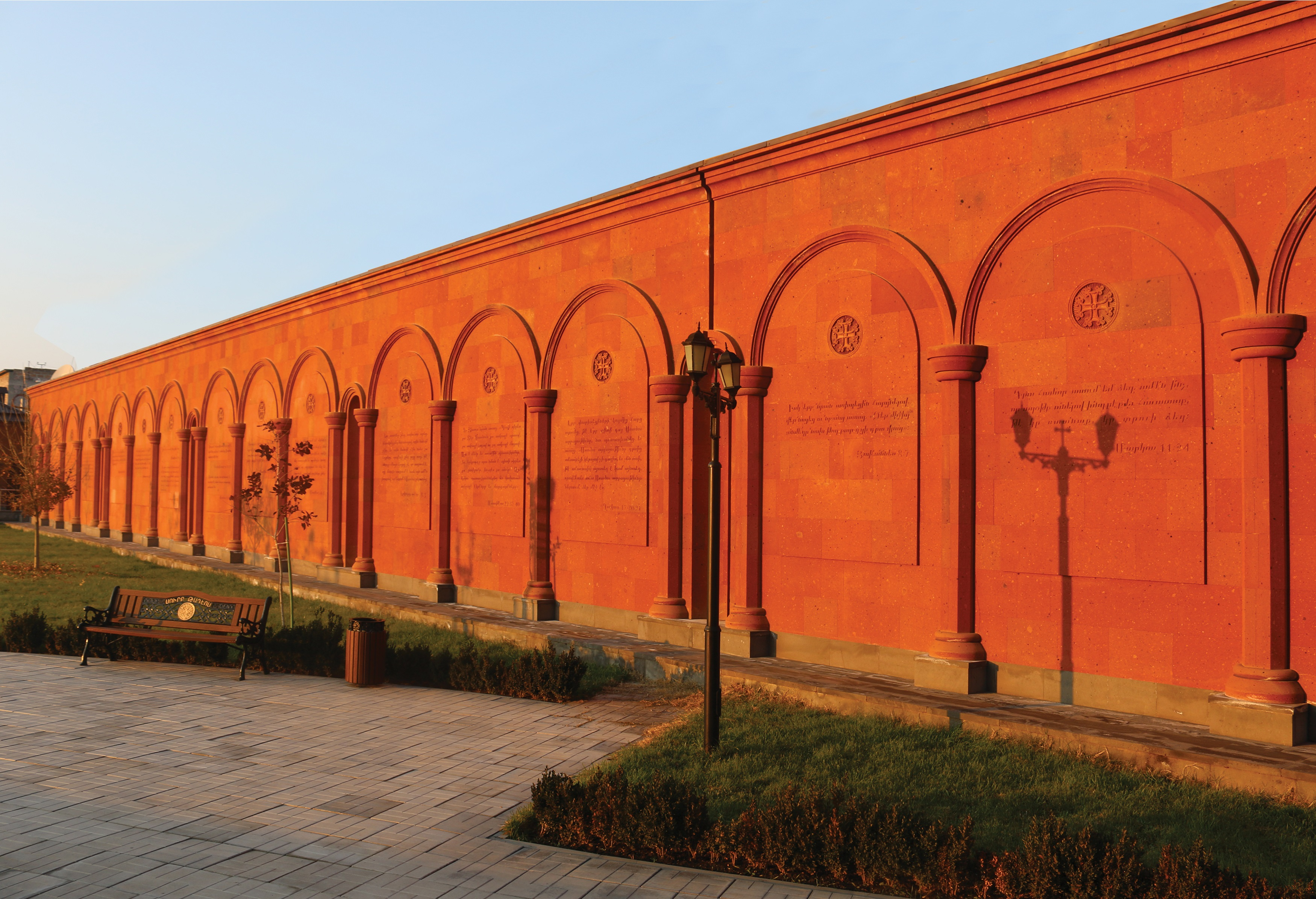
Thirty-three biblical commandments engraved on the wall of the Church
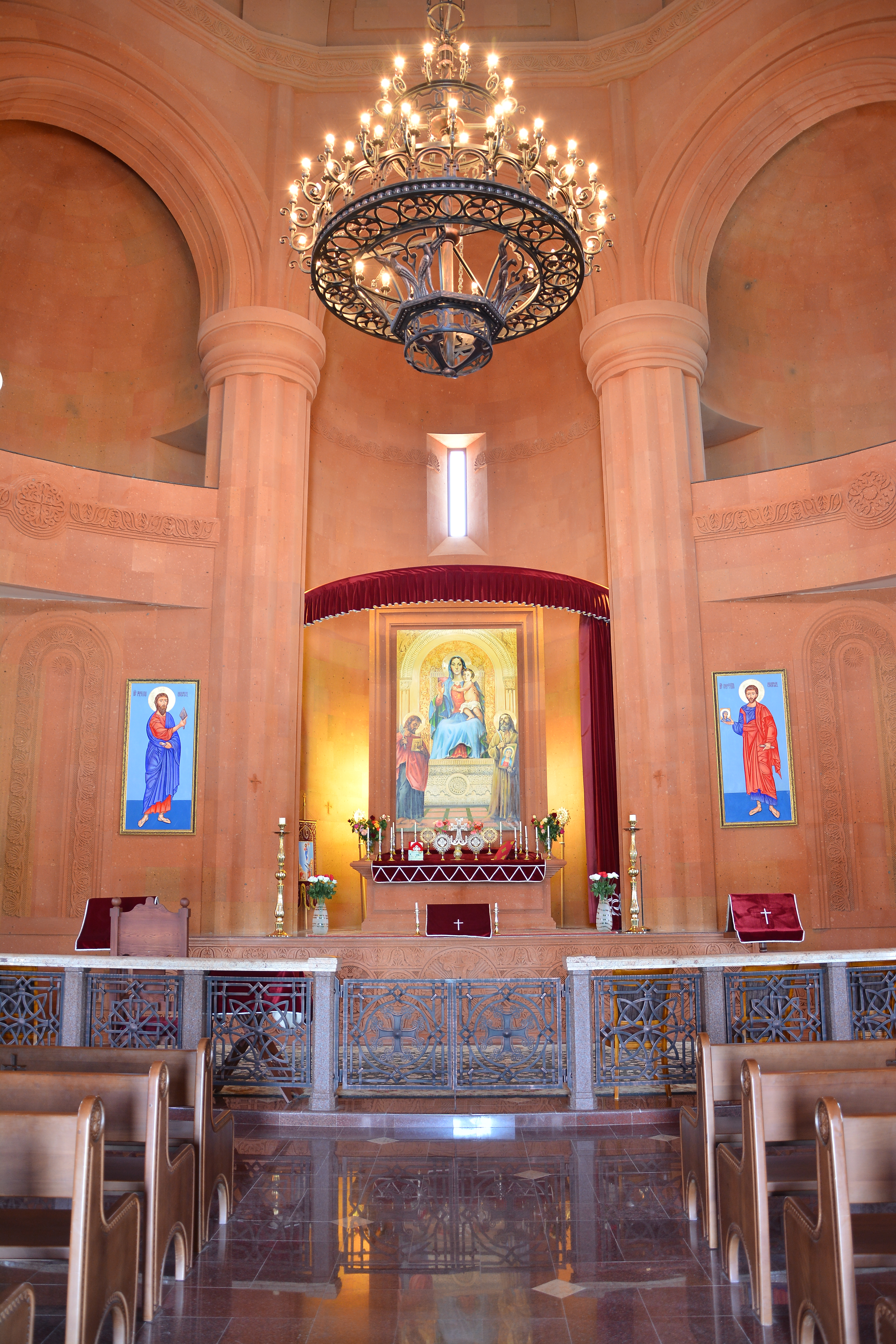
Tabernacle

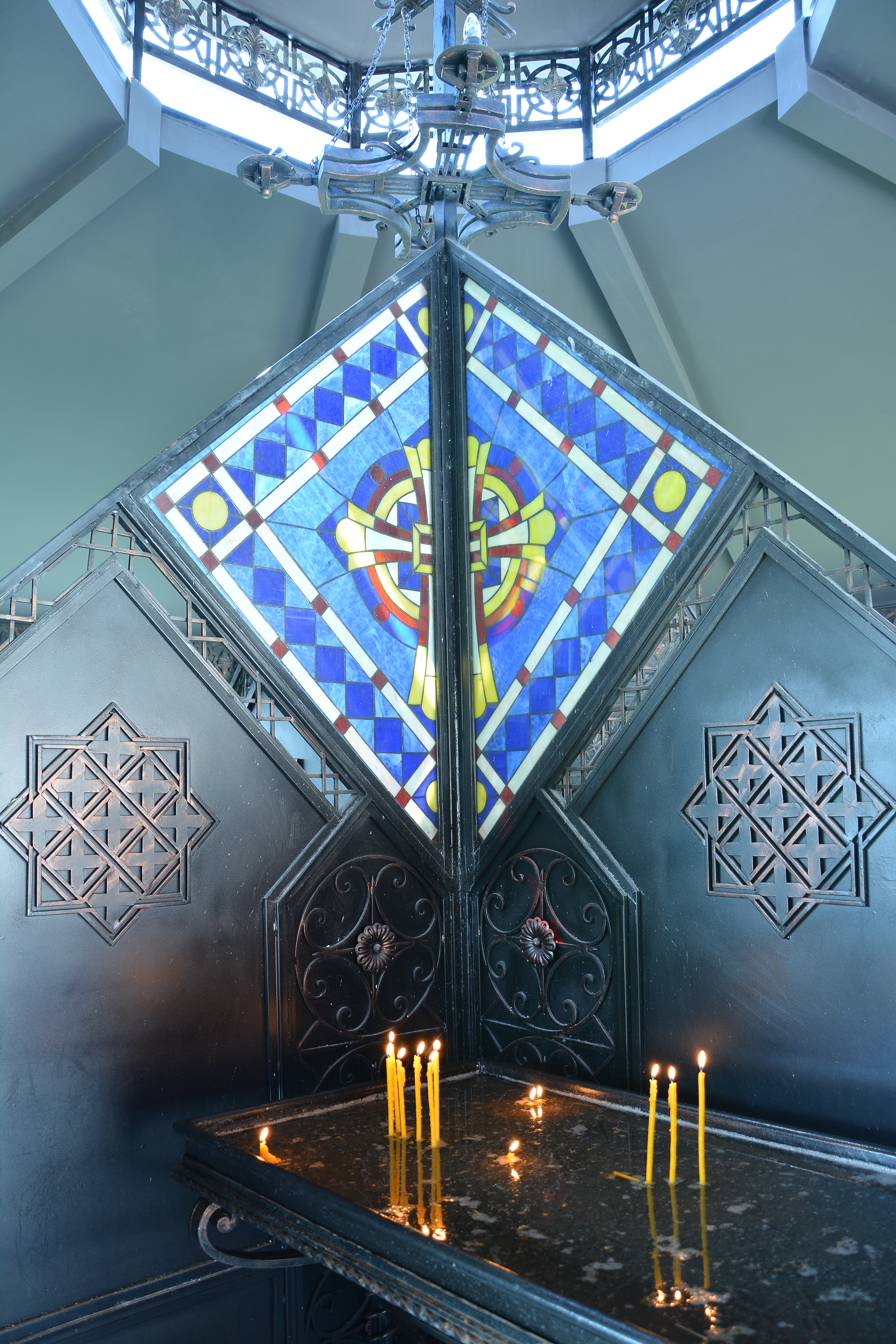
Hall for candle lighting

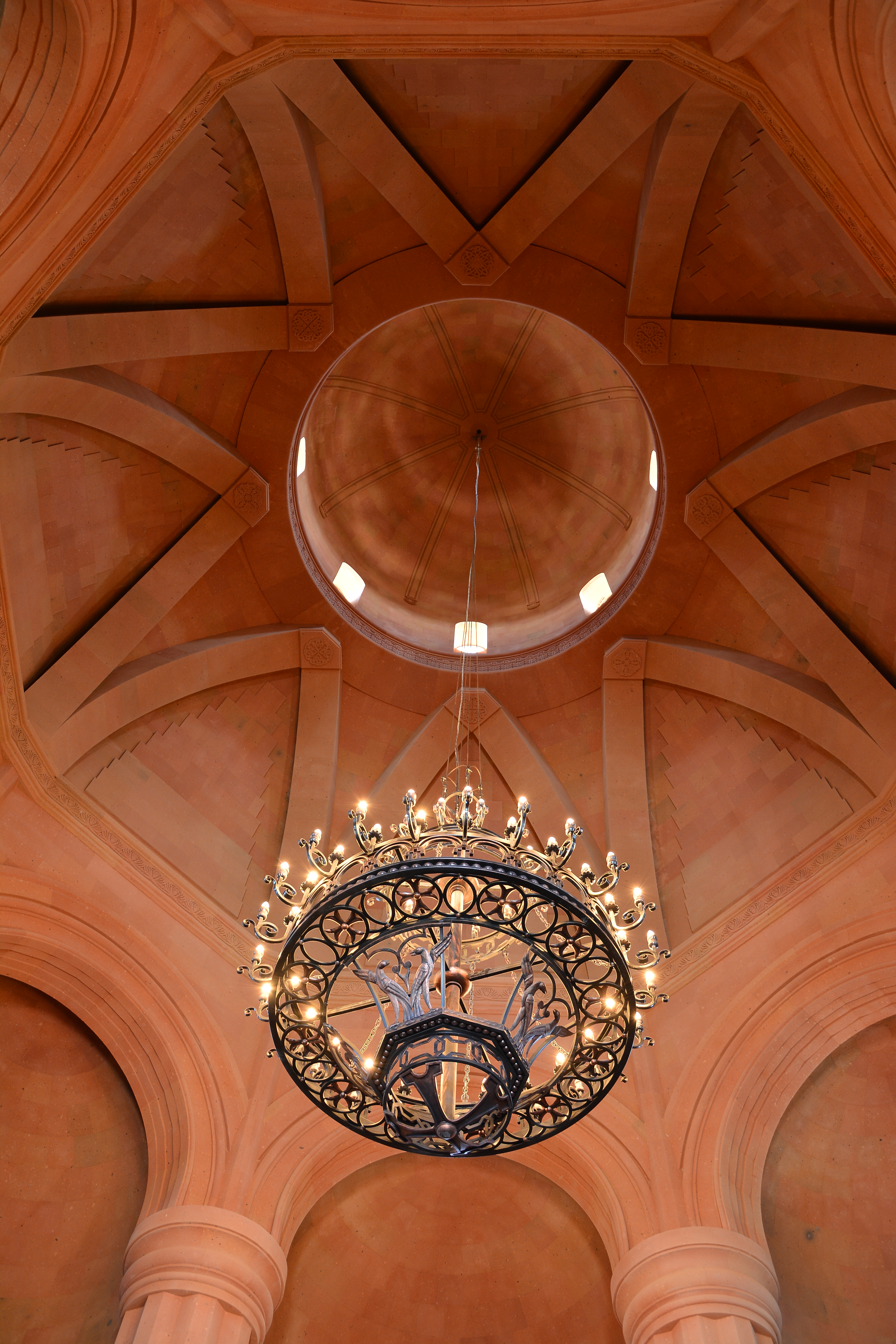
Dome

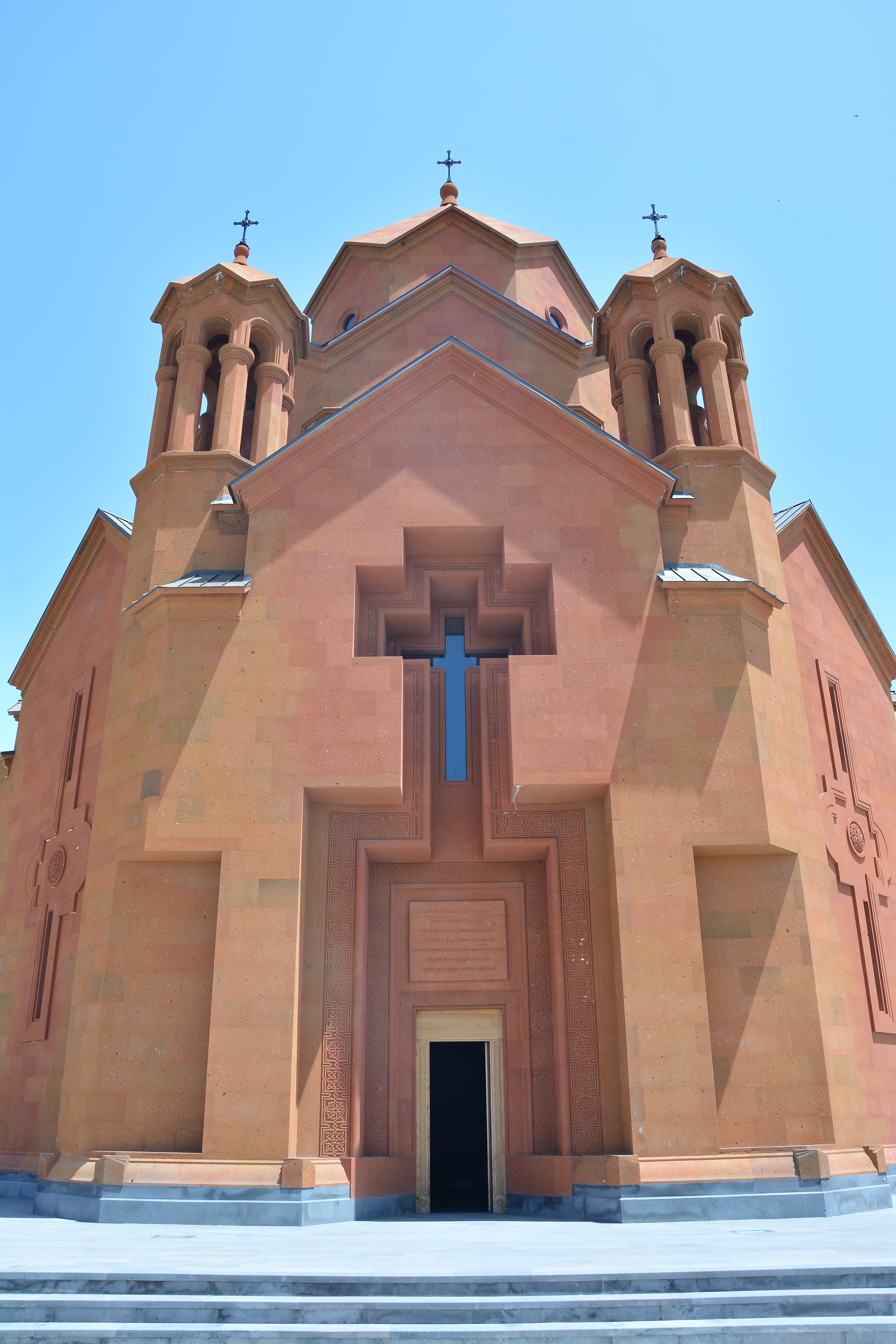
Entrance to Church

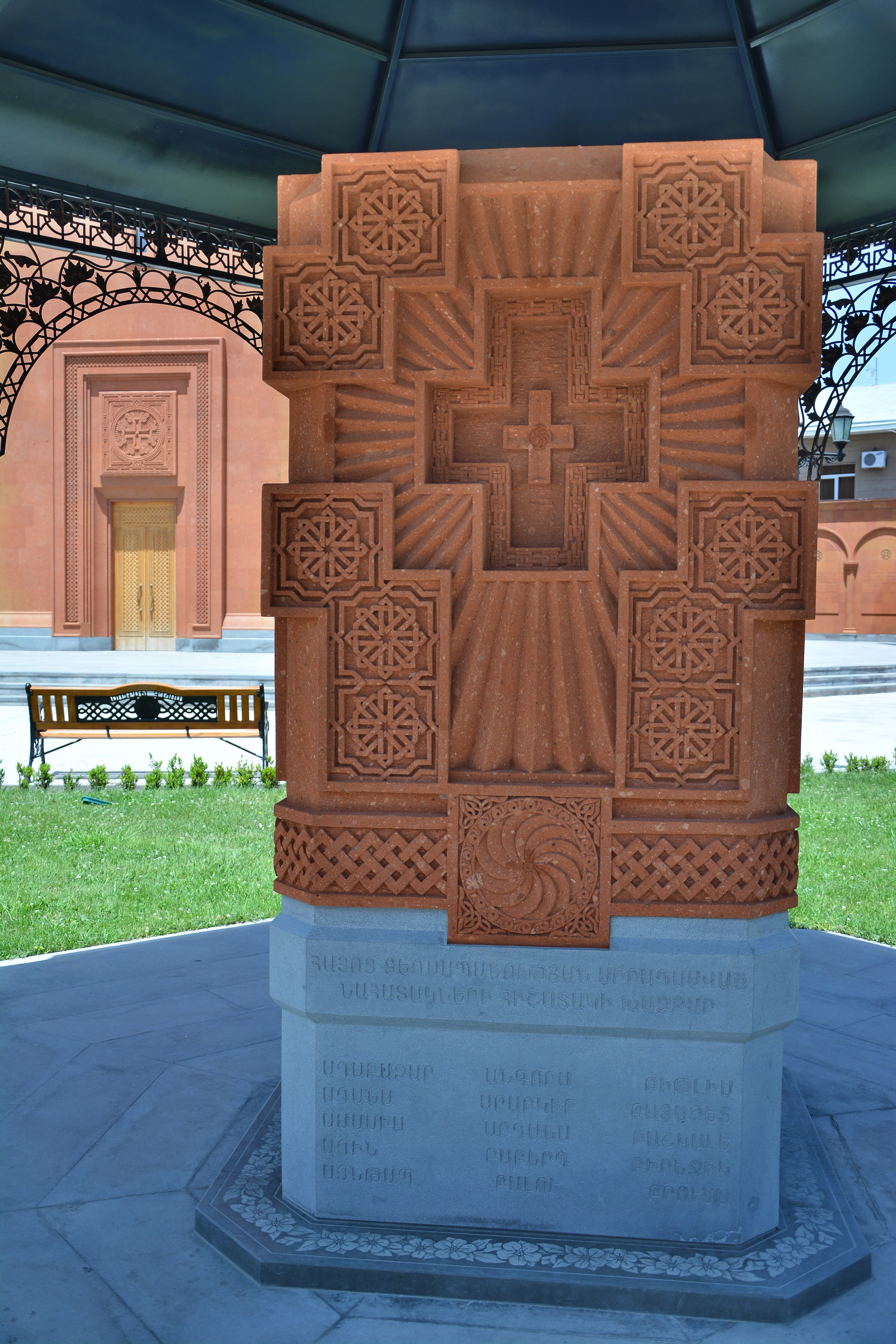
Khachkar in honor of martyrs of the Armenian Genocide

== See also ==
- Apostle Thaddeus
- St. Thaddeus Monastery
