= Masis (town) =

Masis Մասիս
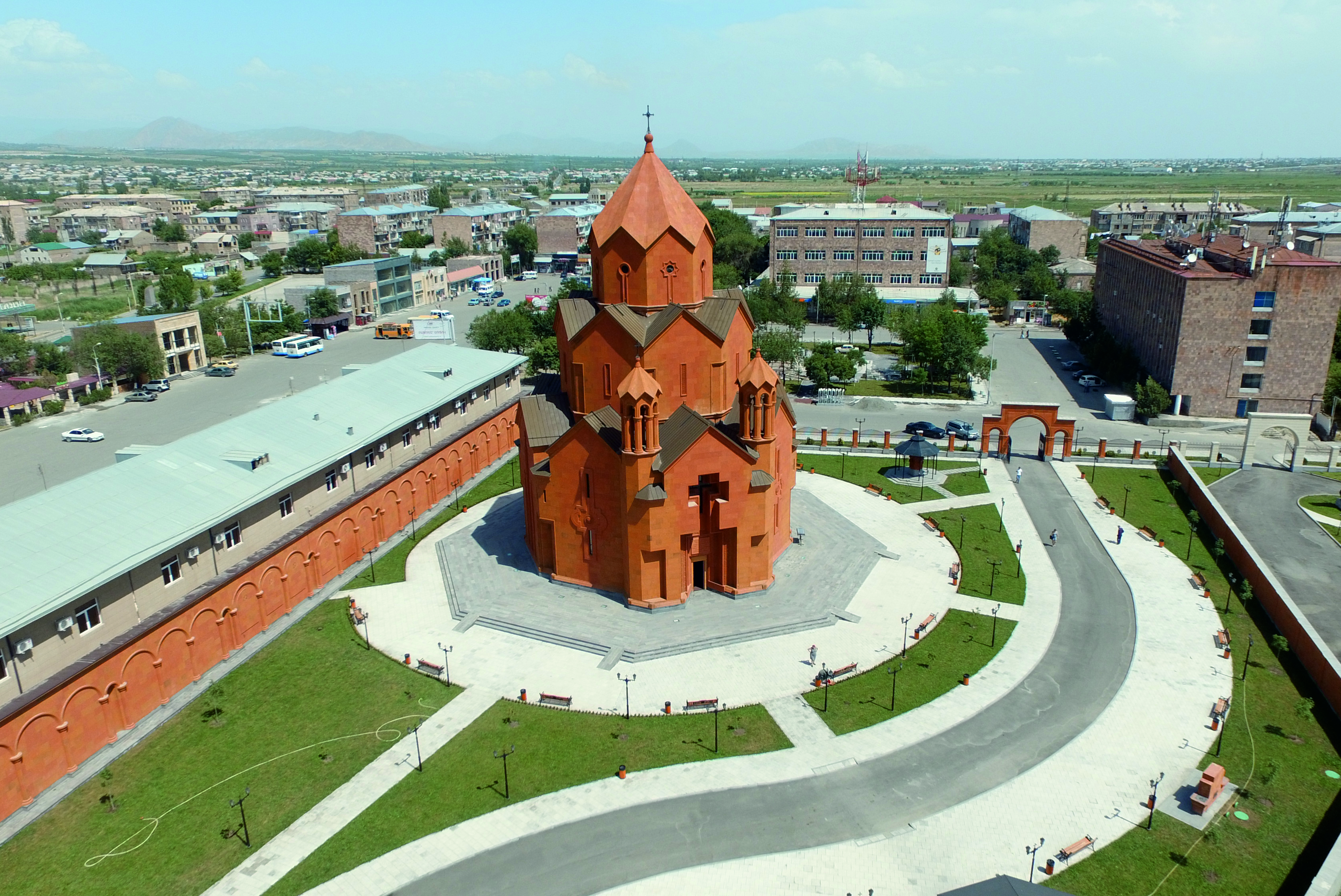
- The centre of Masis with Saint Thaddeus Church

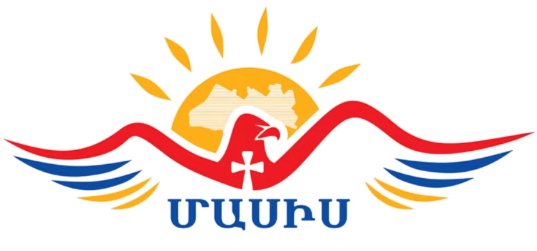
- Coat of arms

- Location within Armenia Location within Ararat
- Coordinates: 40°03′48″N 44°26′27″E
- Country: Armenia
- Province: Ararat
- Municipality: Masis
- Founded: 1953

Area
  - Total: 5.7 km^{2} (2.2 sq mi)
- Elevation: 854 m (2,802 ft)

Population (2022 census)
  - Total: 20,081
  - Rank: Armenia: 15th
  - Density: 3,500/km^{2} (9,100/sq mi)
- Time zone: UTC+4
- Area code: +374(236)
- Website: Official website

Masis (Armenian: Մասիս) is a town and administrative centre of the Masis Municipality of the Ararat Province of Armenia, located on the left bank of the Hrazdan River, 9 km southwest of Yerevan towards Mount Ararat. The town has a large railroad commodity station that serves Yerevan, and used to connect the capital city with the Nakhichevan Autonomous Soviet Socialist Republic until the closing of the border with Azerbaijan.

Masis is one of the closest settlements to Mount Ararat and Little Ararat. The mountains are visible from most of the areas in the town.

As of the 2011 census, the population of the town was 20,215. As per the 2016 official estimate, the town has a population of 18,500. As of the 2022 census, the population of the town was 20,081 and is the biggest town in the Ararat Province.

== Etymology ==
Masis (Մասիս) is the Armenian name for the peak of Mount Ararat. The History of Armenia derives the name from king Amasia, the great-grandson of the Armenian patriarch Hayk, who is said to have called the mountain Masis after his own name.

== History ==
Historically, the territory of modern-day Masis was included within the Vostan Hayots canton of the historical province of Ayrarat of Ancient Armenia.

Masis originally consisted of three villages: Narimanlu, Zangibasar, and Ulukhanlu. During the period of the First Republic of Armenia (1918–1920), the Turkic-speaking Muslim population of Zangibasar and other nearby villages, with the support of the Azerbaijan Democratic Republic, rebelled against Armenian authorities with the intention of attaching the area to Azerbaijan. After issuing an ultimatum to the rebels to submit to Armenian rule, which was rejected, Armenian forces recaptured Zangibasar on 20 June 1920 and drove out some of the Turkic population of the village․ The Turkic population of Ulukhanlu, on the other hand, remained loyal to Armenian rule.

Masis was officially founded by the Soviet government in 1953 as Hrazdan, after the merger of the villages of Narimanlu, Zangibasar, and Ulukhanlu. In 1969 the settlement was renamed Masis to become the centre of the re-founded Masis raion (formerly known as Zangibasar raion form 1937 until it was abolished in 1953). Within 2 years, Masis was given the status of an urban-type settlement in 1971.

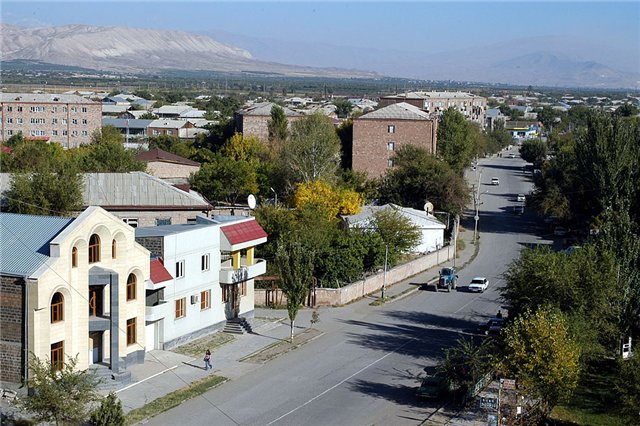
View of Masis in 2006

The settlement was developed as centre for agricultural products and light industries during the Soviet years. It gradually became home to many large firms including the Al. Miasnikian furniture factory, the Masis unit of the Yerevan carpet weaving factory, as well as branch of the Yerevan paper manufacturing plant.

After the dissolution of the Soviet Union, Masis was granted the status of a town within the newly-formed Ararat Province, based on the new law of the territorial administration of the Republic of Armenia passed in 1995.

Masis is connected with a number of villages stretching up to the Aras River at the border with Turkey. At nights, one can see the lights of many Kurdish villages on the slopes of Mount Ararat in Turkey.

== Geography ==
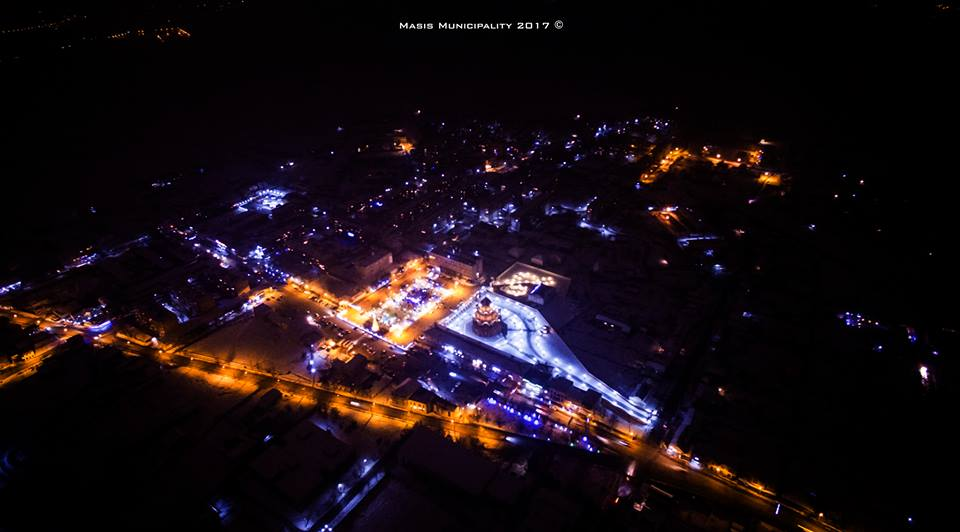
The centre of Masis at night

Masis is located in the Ararat plain on the left bank of Hrazdan River, 16 km southwest of Yerevan on the road to the ancient city of Artashat. It has an average height of 854 meters above sea level.

Summer in general is short but hot in Masis, while winter is relatively long and very cold.

== Demographics ==
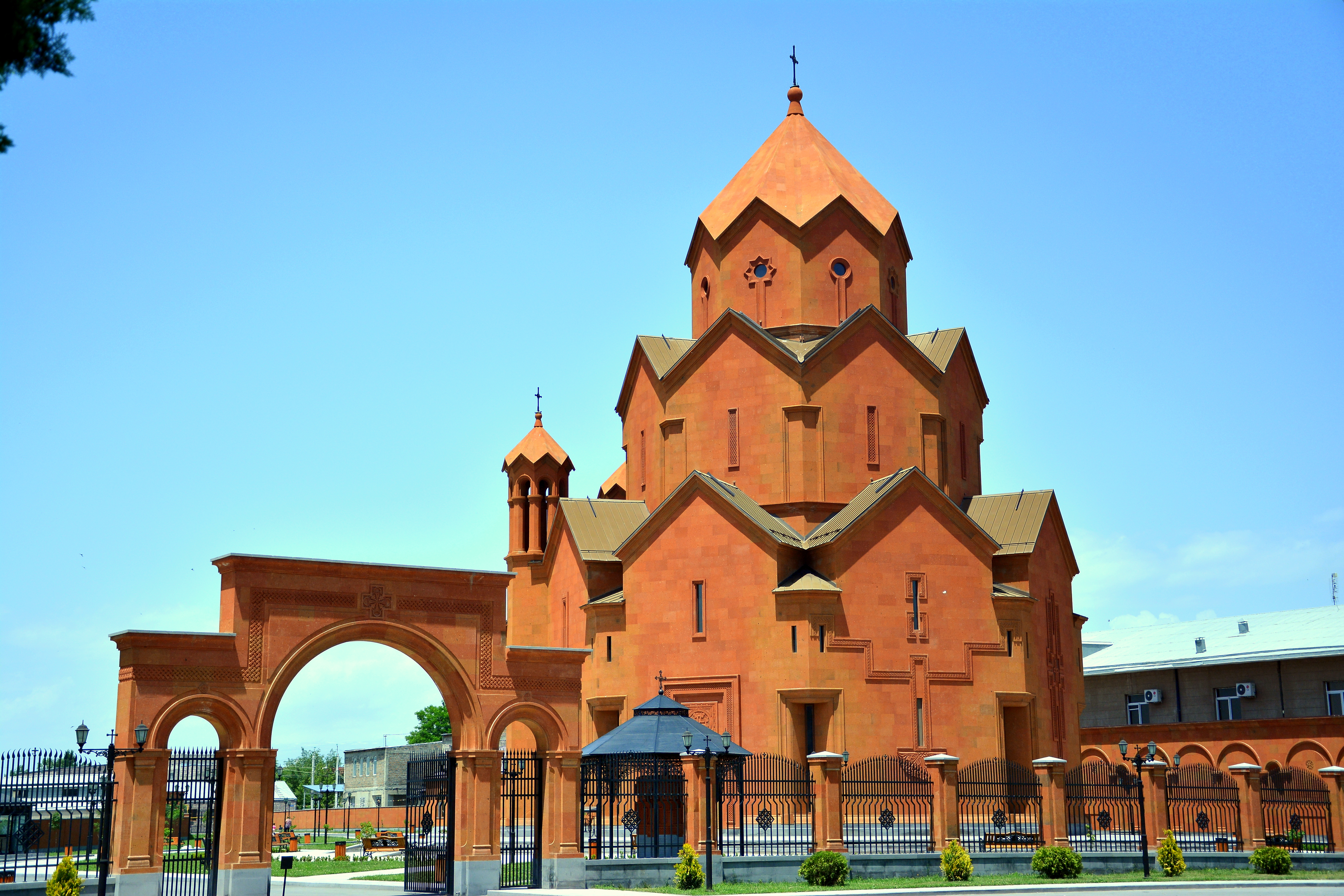
Saint Thaddeus Church

Historical population
Year	Pop.	±% p.a.
1897	2,800	—
1926	2,098	−0.99%
1939	1,195	−4.24%
1959	3,138	+4.95%
1970	4,961	+4.25%
1975	8,142	+10.42%
1980	13,248	+10.23%
2001	21,376	+2.30%
2004	20,215	−1.84%
2022	20,081	−0.04%

== Culture ==
Masis has a 16th-century chapel named after Saint Thaddeus, and a 19th-century church known as the Holy Mother of God.

Currently, the town has a public library and a music school named after Arno Babajanian.

The World War II monument erected in 1983 is one of the main landmarks of Masis.

== Transportation ==
Masis has a railway station since the formation of the town. It used to connect Yerevan with Nakhchivan as well as Iran during the Soviet era. However, after the dissolution of the USSR, the station was abandoned.

The M-2 Motorway that connects the capital Yerevan with southern Armenia, passes through the eastern borders of the town of Masis.

== Economy ==
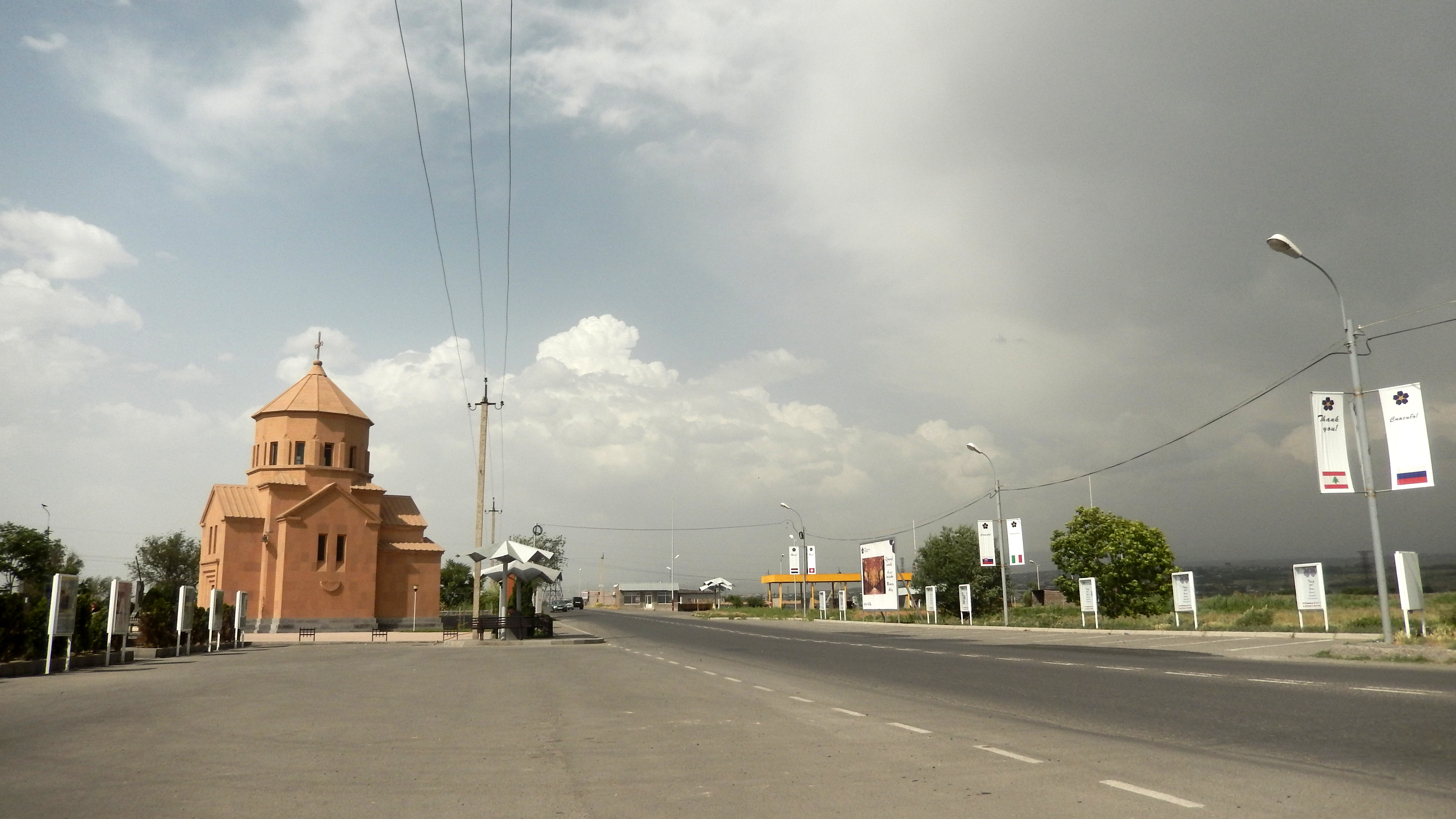
The church of Saint George

The industrial district of Masis occupies the western half of the town. Unfortunately, most of the Soviet industry in Masis was abandoned after the independence of Armenia. However, Masis is currently a major centre for tobacco products in Armenia and Transcaucasia, with 2 giant manufacturers: Masis Tobacco factory (since 1999) and International Masis Tabak factory (since 2002).

It is also home to the Grand Master corrugated cardboard packaging manufacturing and label printing factory (since 1995), Masis Garun knitting factory (since 1995), Berma company for construction and building materials (since 1997), Masis Woodcraft factory (since 2004), Medical Horizons pharmaceuticals factory (since 2005), Masis Woodworking Center, and Sonomad plant for building materials .

Masis is home to the largest slaughterhouse in Armenia, the Voske Katsin Armenian-Iranian joint-venture. It was founded in 2015 and became the first slaughterhouse in Armenia that provides its products with the Halal certification.

== Education ==
As of 2017, Masis has 6 public education schools and 6 kindergartens. It is also home to the Masis State Agricultural College.

== Sport ==
Masis FC represented the town in the domestic football competitions until 1994 when the club was dissolved due to financial difficulties.

The Masis Children and Youth Sports School named after Armen Nazaryan was opened in September 2016.

On March 28, 2017, the construction of a new sports centre was launched in the town of Masis, with the donation of the Adibekyan Family Foundation for Advancement (AFFA). The centre which is set to be completed in June 2018 with a cost of US$2 million, will have fields for mini-football, basketball, outdoors sports, as well as a children's playground and a social family club.

== Notable people ==
- Armen Nazaryan, two-time Olympic Greco-Roman Wrestling Champion with Armenia and Bulgaria
- Arsen Harutyunyan, four-time freestyle wrestling European Champion

== See also ==
- Gortsaranayin Street in Masis town, the Republic of Armenia, was renamed after Hrant Vardanyan on February 5, 2019.
- Masis (village)
